= San Gregorio Maggiore, Spoleto =

Church building in Spoleto, Italy

Coordinates: 42.740165°N 12.736451°E

San Gregorio Magno is a Romanesque-style, Roman Catholic basilica church located in front of the piazza Garibaldi in the town of Spoleto, in the province of Perugia, region of Umbria, Italy.

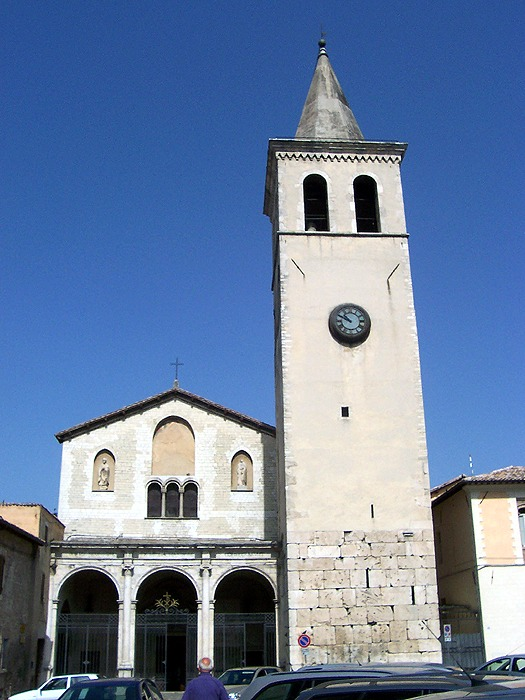
Facade and bell-tower

== History ==
The church was built atop the site of an earlier church during the end the 11th and start of the 12th century, leading to consecration in 1146. Traces of the earlier building exist in the crypt. The bell-tower, embedded with spolia, was begun in the 12th century. Because the site had a nearby cemetery, many of the tombstones were reutilized in the church. The church was refurbished during the 16th and 18th centuries. The main portal (1597) was donated by the bishop Paolo Sanvitale.

To the left of the entrance portico is the Chapel of the Innocents, with frescoes that recall the founding of the church and the Life of Santa Abbondanza, supposedly buried here. It now houses the baptismal font and has a Romanesque architrave. The interior was frescoed in the 15th century.

From one of the exits, one can access the Ancient Roman bridge, Ponte Sanguinario spanning the Tessino stream.
