= Bernardino Campilius =

Italian painter

Bernardino Campilius was an Italian painter and follower of Lo Spagna at Spoleto. His name was written beneath a fresco of The Virgin adoring the Infant on the Piazza San Gregorio at Spoleto, and bears the date of 1502.
