= San Paolo inter vineas, Spoleto =

Church building in Spoleto, Italy

Coordinates: 42.7297°N 12.7300°E

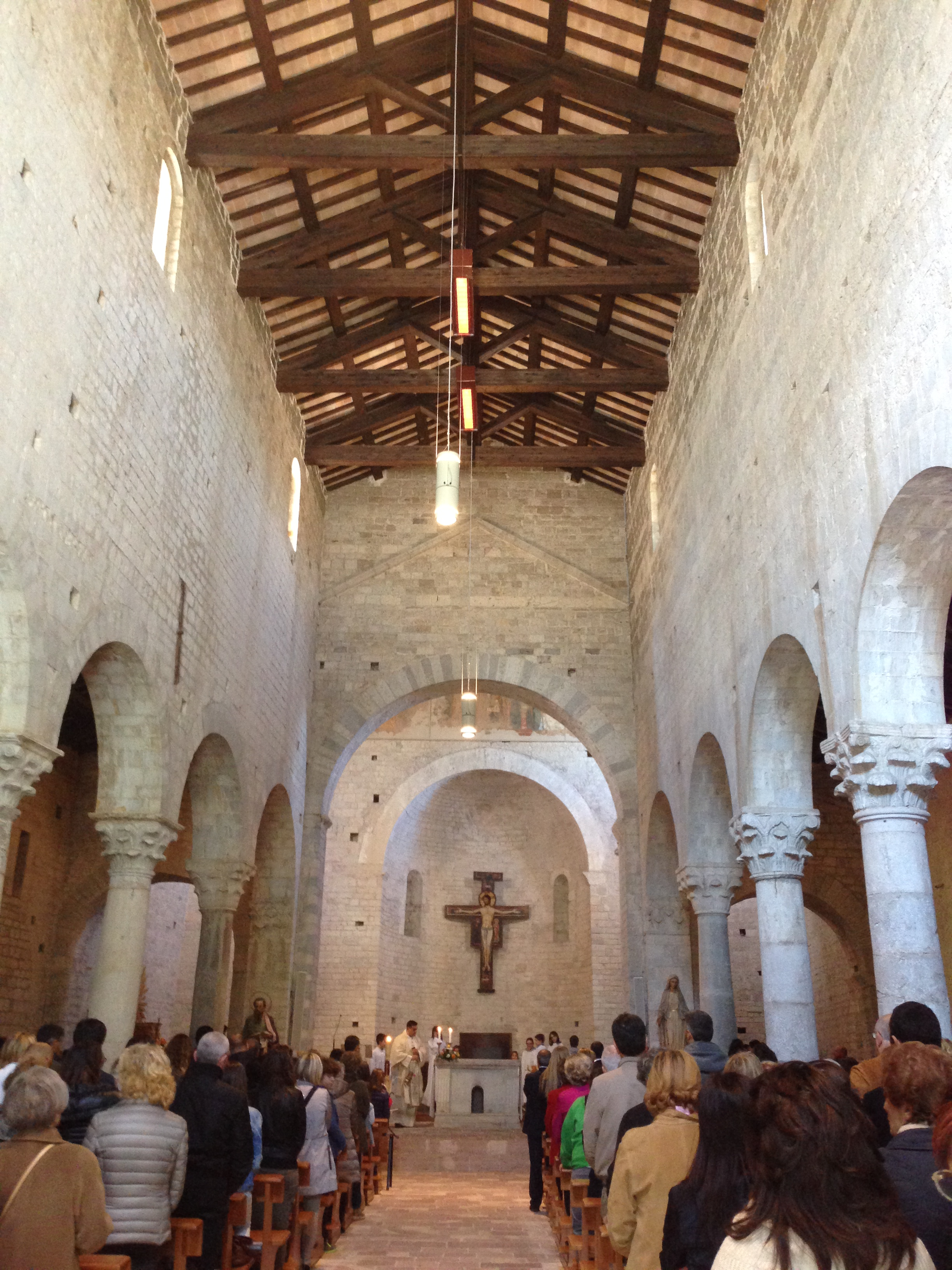
Chiesa di San Paolo. Spoleto. Navata centrale

San Paolo inter vineas is a Romanesque-style, Roman Catholic church in Spoleto, region of Umbria, Italy. The term inter vineas refers to its location outside town, among the vineyards.

A church at the site was founded in the 6th century in time of Pope Gregory the Great, when legend holds that a miracle occurred when a heretical Arian Lombard bishop was struck blind while holding mass. The first document date buildings here by the 10th century, when the church was affiliated with a Benedictine order convent of nuns. The church was rebuilt in 1234, and consecrated by Pope Gregory IX. In the 14th century, the monastery was abandoned and relocated inside the city walls, next to the church of Sant'Agata. In 1771, the church was again reconstructed and the interior redone. In 1965, the reconstruction attempted to highlight original late-Romanesque style of the early 13th century. The facade recalls two other churches in Spoleto, San Pietro and San Ponziano, with a central rose window and a suggestion of the central nave and two aisles. The interior has frescoes from the 13th century.
