= Spoleto =

Town in Umbria, Italy

- Comune
- Città di Spoleto
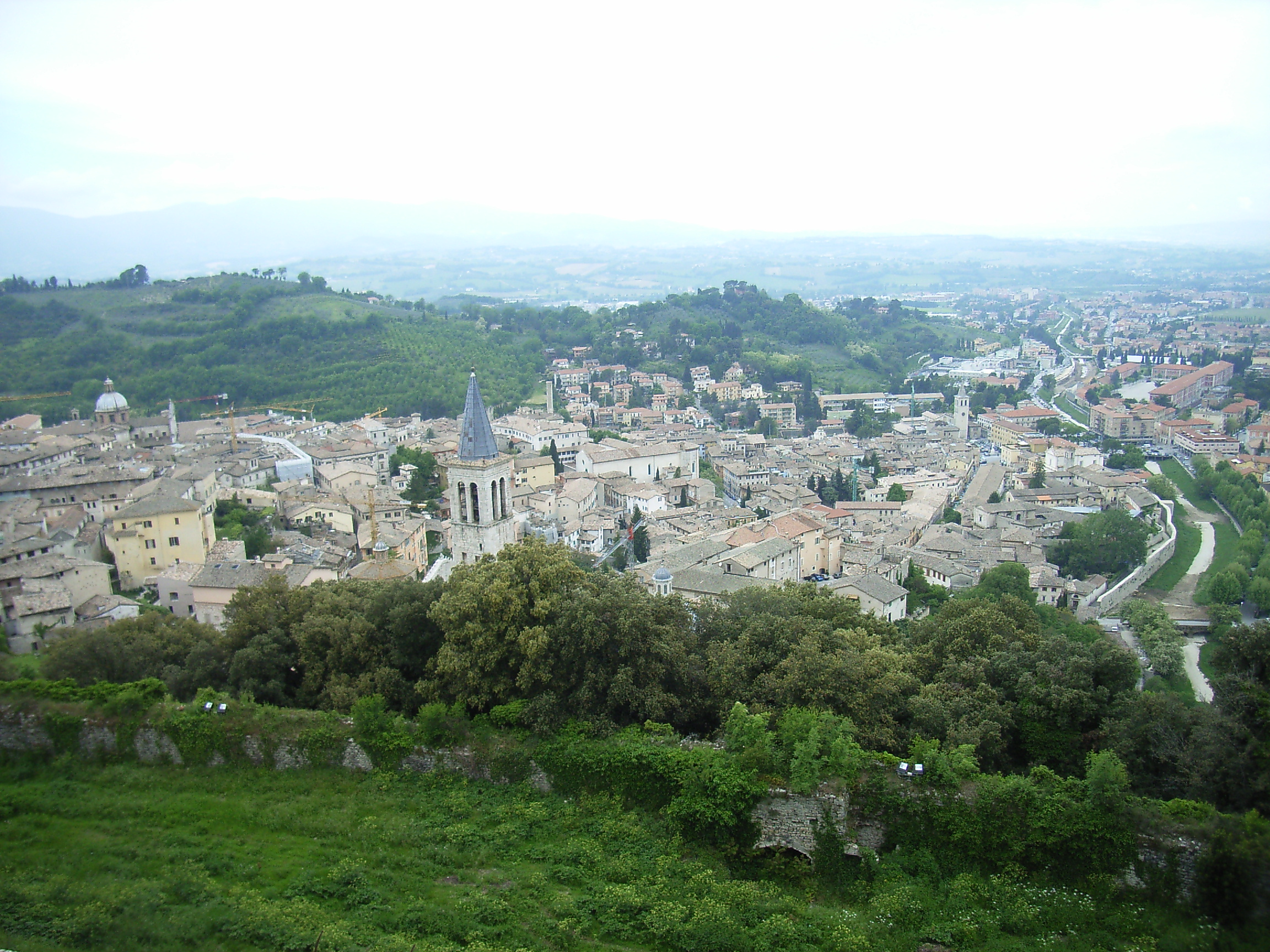
- View of Spoleto

- Flag Coat of arms

- Location within Italy Location within Umbria
- Coordinates: 42.73441°N 12.738462°E
- Country: Italy
- Region: Umbria
- Province: Perugia (PG)
- Frazioni: see list

Government
  - Mayor: Andrea Sisti

Area
  - Total: 349 km^{2} (135 sq mi)
- Elevation: 396 m (1,299 ft)

Population (1 January 2025)
  - Total: 35,983
  - Density: 103/km^{2} (267/sq mi)
- Demonym: Spoletini
- Time zone: UTC+1 (CET)
  - Summer (DST): UTC+2 (CEST)
- Postal code: 06049
- Dialing code: 0743
- Patron saint: San Ponziano
- Saint day: January 14
- Website: Official website

Spoleto (/spəˈleɪtoʊ/, also US: /spoʊˈleɪtoʊ, spoʊˈliːtoʊ/, UK: /spoʊˈlɛtoʊ/, Italian: [spoˈleːto]; Latin: Spoletium) is an ancient city in the Italian province of Perugia in east-central Umbria on a foothill of the Apennines.

It is 20 km (12 mi) south of Trevi, 29 km (18 mi) north of Terni, 63 km (39 mi) southeast of Perugia; 212 km (132 mi) southeast of Florence; and 126 km (78 mi) north of Rome.

Founded by the Umbri in the 10th century BC and later taken by the Etruscans, it became a Roman colony in 241 BC.

Under Lombard rule, Spoleto became the seat of the Duchy of Spoleto in 576, controlling much of central Italy.

== Etymology ==
In classical sources Spoleto appears as Spoletium (Σπωλήτιον), with the later form Spoletum.

Spoleto was founded by the Umbrians, who called it Pola, meaning a place of pilgrims; the name later became Spoleti, then Spoleto.

== History ==
=== Antiquity ===
Spoleto was founded by the Umbri in the 10th century BC and was taken by the Etruscans in the 7th century BC.

The first historical mention of Spoletium is the notice of the foundation of a Roman colony there, in the year AUC 513 (241 BCE), shortly after the end of the First Punic War. In this period the city underwent major expansion and was heavily fortified, with polygonal city walls.

Spoleto is frequently mentioned during the Second Punic War. In 217 BC, immediately after the Battle of Lake Trasimene, Hannibal advanced to the walls of Spoleto and attacked the city, which was vigorously defended by the colonists, forcing him to withdraw and retreat into Picenum. A few years later, in 209 BC, Spoleto distinguished itself among the colonies for its fidelity to its alliance with Rome at a critical moment in the war.

After this period, Spoleto is less frequently mentioned, though it is understood to have been a flourishing municipium. In 167 BC the Roman Senate selected the city as the place of confinement for Gentius, king of Illyria, after his defeat, but the inhabitants refused, and Iguvium was chosen instead.

The city suffered greatly during Sulla's civil war. In 82 BC a battle took place in the Spoletan valley between Pompey and Crassus, generals of Sulla, and a lieutenant of Carbo, who was defeated and forced to take refuge in the city. Following Sulla's victory, Spoleto was among the cities most severely punished, with its territory confiscated under the pretext of establishing a military colony.

Despite this, the city retained importance. Augustus held the consulship there, and Cicero referred to it as a most firm and illustrious Latin colony. It later became a municipality along with other Latin colonies under the Lex Julia and belonged to the Horatian tribe. The city is again mentioned during the Perusine War in 41 BC, when it provided refuge to Munatius Plancus after his defeat by Octavian. Thereafter it appears only rarely in historical accounts, though it continued under the Empire as a flourishing municipality.

Near Spoleto, the emperor Aemilianus encamped after the deaths of Gallus and Volusianus, briefly held imperial power, and was subsequently killed by his own soldiers after a reign of three months.

Imperial rescripts were issued at Spoleto by Constantine in 326 and by Julian in 362.

Spoleto was not situated directly on the Via Flaminia, which passed nearby along the line from Narnia to Mevania, leaving Spoleto and Interamna to the right. This route remained in use until the time of Vespasian, after which a new line passing through Interamna and Spoleto was preferred, as attested by later itineraries.

The territory of Spoleto was fertile even in antiquity, and its wine was praised by Martial. The river Nera separated it from the Sabine territory.

In the 4th century Spoleto became an episcopal seat, with a stronger church organization. This period was associated with the presence of churches and monasteries both in the town and on the slopes of Monteluco.

=== Gothic wars ===
In the 5th century Spoleto experienced barbarian invasions connected with Theodoric, Belisarius, Totila, and Narses.

During the time of Odoacer, the province of Tuscia became nearly deserted due to devastation and depopulation. Flooding from the Marroggia river and other neglected streams caused stagnant waters to inundate the lower parts of the Spoletan territory, and the city itself became desolate, filled with ruins and decaying buildings.

During the war between Odoacer and Theodoric, the inhabitants appear to have supported the Ostrogothic king. Theodoric took measures to restore the city, allocating an annual sum from royal revenues and commissioning additional funds to repair the ancient baths. The poet and physician Rusticus Elpidius, who resided in Spoleto, contributed to these improvements and adorned the city with a portico and a public square. A palace attributed to Theodoric is associated with remains of a portico or atrium with double rows of pillars visible beneath a house near the northern side of the Piazza del Mercato.

One of the most significant works of this period was the drainage of marshy lands in the lower territory. This project was undertaken by Speranza and Domizio, who received the reclaimed lands in return. Around this time, Isaac of Syria, fleeing persecution, came to Spoleto and founded the monastery of San Giuliano and hermitages on Monte Luco.

Spoleto is mentioned by Procopius during the Gothic Wars. Totila captured the city and partially destroyed its fortifications.

In 536 Belisarius entered Italy, captured Naples, and advanced toward Rome. His general Bessas occupied Narni, while Constantine, tasked with recovering Tuscia, crossed the Nera and took Spoleto, Perugia, and other places. The Gothic king Vitiges attempted to recover these territories but was defeated near Perugia. During this period, an incident occurred involving Presidio, a noble refugee who settled near the church of San Pietro outside the walls. His valuable arms were seized by Constantine, leading to conflict with Belisarius, who ultimately had Constantine executed.

The Goths later regained strength, and Totila recaptured Spoleto after it was treacherously handed over by Herodian. Totila damaged the city’s walls extensively and converted the amphitheater at the base of the hill into a fortified stronghold by closing its arches and stationing a mixed garrison of Goths and deserters. Many inhabitants fled to nearby settlements.

The Goths killed Bishop Saint John II, who had governed the see for 50 years. His remains were later rediscovered and translated to a monastery church, where he became venerated as a co-patron of the city and was depicted on medieval coinage.

Through stratagem, the Byzantines later regained Spoleto when a man named Marziano infiltrated the Gothic garrison, persuaded part of it to defect, and facilitated the capture of the fortress. Narses subsequently defeated the Goths decisively and, in 552, restored the walls of Spoleto and reestablished a garrison, encouraging the return of the inhabitants.

The administrative system that followed, governed by military commanders, laid the foundation for the later duchies.

=== Lombard and Frankish period ===
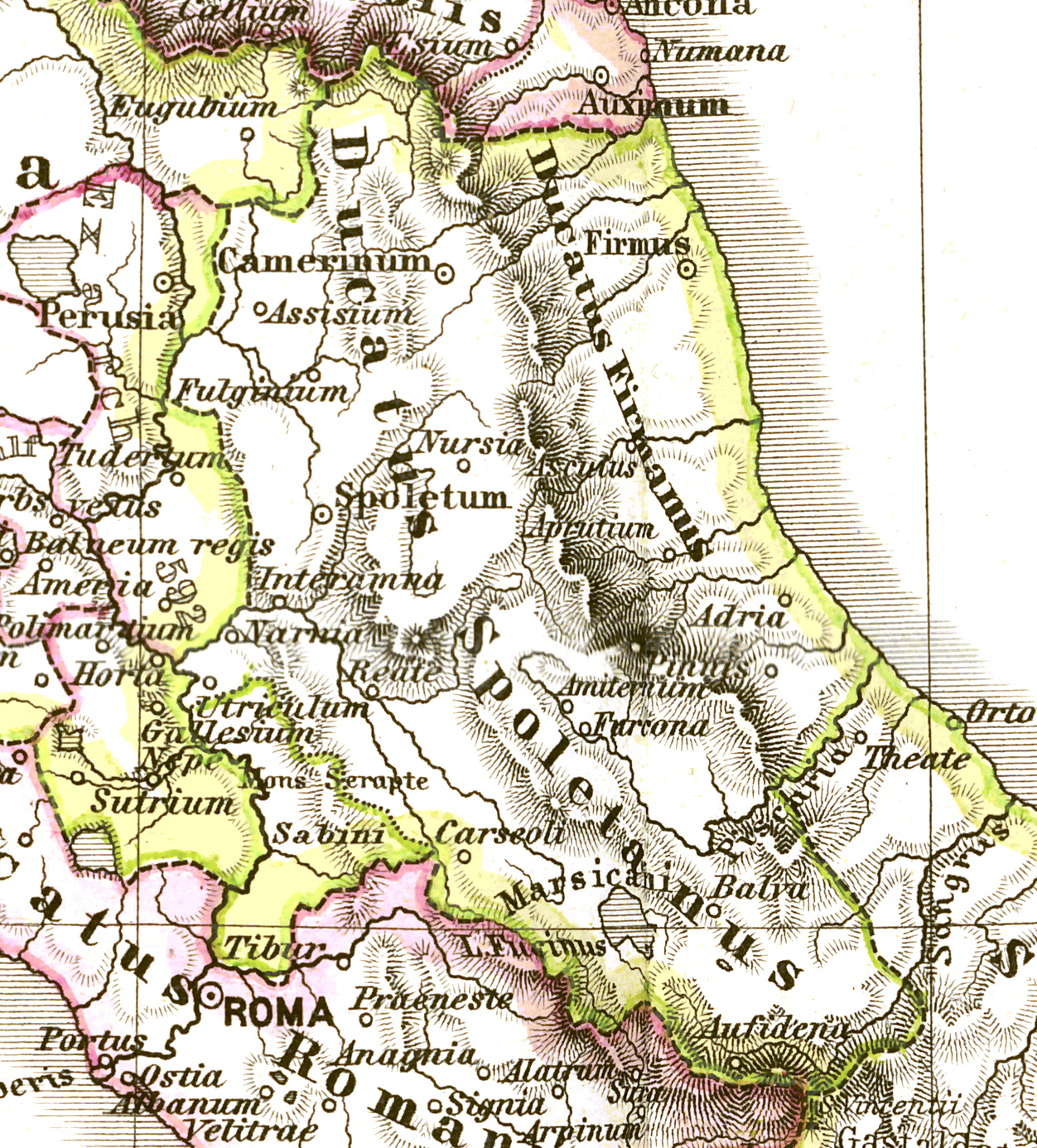
At its greatest extent, the Duchy of Spoleto covered large parts of modern Umbria, Abruzzo, Marche, and Lazio

In 576 Faroald I made Spoleto the seat of the Duchy of Spoleto, a key Lombard duchy. The Duchy of Spoleto included Umbria, Sabina, Picenum as far as Pescara, and the regions of the Marrucini, Marsi, and Peligni. It was divided into districts governed by officials.

Faroald I was succeeded in 591 by Ariulf, who further extended its territory and is believed to have embraced Catholicism later in life. Conflicts followed between Lombard rulers and the papacy. During periods of instability, the duchy was sometimes governed directly by the Lombard king.

In the mid-8th century, local nobles elected Alboin as duke, aligning with the papacy under the protection of Pepin. This led to retaliation by King Desiderius, who invaded and devastated the duchy, capturing Alboin.

Desiderius later mobilized forces against the papacy, prompting appeals to Charlemagne. After the defeat of Desiderius and the end of Lombard power, the donation of Charlemagne, which also included the Duchy of Spoleto, is understood to have had effect only in terms of supreme authority rather than actual governance, leaving the dukes of Spoleto in effective control of their territory for a long time as supreme rulers and legislators.

In 774 Spoleto became a Frankish fief. After 788 or 789, the Lombard duke Hildeprand is no longer mentioned, marking the end of the Lombard dukes in Spoleto and the beginning of Frankish and German rule. Charlemagne appointed Winigis, a Frank, as duke.

In his testament, Charlemagne left the Duchy of Spoleto to his sons, as he had not ceded full sovereignty of the duchy to Pope Adrian I but only granted the pensions and annual tribute previously paid to the Lombard royal palace. The beginning of effective Church dominion over the lands of Umbria and the Sabina is placed in the 10th century.

=== Destruction under Frederick Barbarossa ===
In 1155, Frederick Barbarossa ordered the destruction of Spoleto. After traveling to Rome, where he was crowned emperor by Pope Adrian IV, he received tribute from the province of Ancona and from several other Umbrian cities; however, the Duchy of Spoleto refused to provide this tribute. The emperor reacted by initiating military action, particularly after the inhabitants of Spoleto carried out hostile acts against his envoy, Guido Guerra. The city was captured, and subsequently burned and destroyed.

Frederick reported to Otto of Freising that he advanced on Spoleto because it was in rebellion and was holding Count Guido Guerra and other envoys in captivity; that the city, strongly fortified and provided with about 100 towers, was extensively plundered, and reduced to devastation down to its foundations.

Afterward Frederick sought reconciliation with the city and appointed Conrad of Swabia, lord of Urslingen, as duke. He granted possessions to the monastery of San Pietro of Monte Martano and, in 1185, through the intercession of the duke, donated valuable relics to the cathedral, which were received by the citizens as pledges of restored peace. A plaque in the municipal palace commemorates the destruction carried out by Frederick.

=== Beginning of Papal rule ===
With the death of Henry VI, son of Frederick Barbarossa, the line of dukes came to an end. In his testament he ordered that the Duchy of Spoleto, along with other dominions, be restored to the Holy See. Pope Innocent III moved to reclaim these territories, expelling Conrad of Swabia. Conrad restored the duchy, as well as Rieti, Assisi, Foligno, and Nocera, to avoid excommunication.

In 1198 Innocent III personally visited Spoleto. On 25 August, returning from Rieti, he promised the inhabitants protection and assistance before proceeding to Perugia. Cardinal Giovanni Colonna the Younger was appointed rector of the duchy and governed it for three years. Emperor Otto IV, claiming lands of the Church, appointed Dipold as duke of Spoleto, followed by Rainald, who continued usurpations of Church property and was imprisoned by Frederick II.

In 1223 Cardinal Raniero Capocci served as rector or legate of the March of Ancona and the Duchy of Spoleto. He faced opposition from Berthold, son of Duke Conrad, whose actions led to papal excommunication. Frederick II, hostile to the Church and in conflict with Pope Honorius III, levied troops in the duchy in 1226, but the Spoletans refused to assist. In that same year Berthold assumed the title of duke, supported by Frederick II. Tancredi of Campello, one of his principal supporters, blocked the roads leading to Rome, disrupted commerce, and imprisoned papal officials.

Various leaders of the Ghibelline faction subsequently assumed the title of duke, while the Spoletans also applied the title by custom to papal rectors. Conrad is regarded as the last true duke of Spoleto. When Frederick II departed for the Syrian campaign, he entrusted the Kingdom of Sicily, held by papal investiture, to Rainald, duke of Spoleto and another son of Conrad. Rainald, with Sicilian forces, harassed the March of Ancona and besieged Assisi, while Berthold operated from the direction of Norcia. Pope Gregory IX, finding excommunications ineffective, resorted to military action and recovered these territories with forces led by Cardinal Colonna and John of Brienne, former king of Jerusalem, thereby restoring the duchy.

From this time onward the popes governed the duchy through a rector, who delegated authority to local lieutenants. Gregory IX granted the administration of the Duchy of Spoleto for three years to Milo, bishop of Beauvais. The pope himself resided in the region on several occasions, including in 1228 and 1232 at Rieti, Spoleto, and Perugia. On 30 May 1232 in Spoleto he canonized the Franciscan Anthony of Padua. In 1234 he held a council in Spoleto for the crusade, attended by Frederick II and his son Conrad IV, as well as the Latin patriarchs of Constantinople, Antioch, and Jerusalem and numerous bishops. The crusade was proclaimed in the main square before a large assembly.

In 1254 Pope Alexander IV appointed Bonifacio da Fogliano di Reggio as rector of the Duchy of Spoleto, and he recovered Foligno and other places in Umbria that had been seized by imperial forces under Innocent IV. Internal conflicts between Guelfs and Ghibellines intensified. In 1273 Pope Gregory X ordered the Perugians to restore Gubbio, Nocera, and Gualdo to the duchy for the Church. Under Pope Martin IV, Charles I of Anjou, king of Sicily, served as rector.

=== 14th century ===
During the pontificate of Clement V, the Ghibellines of Spoleto, allied with Federico I of Montefeltro and other Ghibellines of Umbria and the Marche, expelled the Guelphs, taking many prisoners. In 1317 Rinaldo di Santa Artemia was rector. In 1319 rebellions in Osimo and Recanati encouraged the Ghibellines of Spoleto to rise against the Guelphs. Federico of Montefeltro entered the city at night, imprisoned two hundred Guelphs, and expelled the rest. The Guelphs called upon Perugia for assistance, leading to a siege, which was lifted when Assisi rebelled.

In 1324 the Ghibellines of Perugia attacked Spoleto and partially burned it. Agreements followed placing Spoleto under the protection of Perugia, expelling the Ghibellines and restoring the Guelphs. In 1328 Ghibelline forces were defeated near San Gemini by Spoletan and Perugian troops. In 1326 the Spoletans, recognizing Perugian domination, refused further submission, prompting Perugia to construct a fortress near the gate of Fuga, known as the Castellina, later destroyed but remembered in place names.

In 1352 a severe earthquake devastated the city. In 1353 Cardinal Albornoz was sent to Italy to restore papal authority. He governed the city, repaired and strengthened its walls, recalled Ghibelline exiles, and ended Perugian control over the appointment of the podestà. In 1364 he annulled earlier agreements with Perugia, recovered territories, demolished the Perugian fortress, and ordered the construction of the Rocca of Sant'Elia.

Pope Gregory XI appointed Cardinal Francesco Tebaldeschi as legate. In 1375 Spoleto, along with other cities, submitted to the Orsini under Florentine protection against the pope, leading to the excommunication of Rinaldo Orsini by Urban VI. In 1388 Boniface IX recovered Spoleto, and in 1392 entered Umbria to quell civil wars. Giovanni Tomacelli, nephew of the pope, was made duke of Spoleto and Orvieto.

=== 15th century ===
In 1414 Ladislaus, king of Sicily, attempted to capture Spoleto but was repelled with heavy losses. In 1418 Martin V appointed Guido Antonio, count of Urbino, as duke. In 1419 the city submitted to Braccio da Montone, who attempted unsuccessfully to seize the fortress and was wounded during the siege.

Spoleto suffered severe outbreaks of plague in 1414 and 1436.

In 1438 Francesco Piccinino, in service to the duke of Milan, occupied the city with the support of Pirro Tomacelli, abbot and prefect of the duchy, and allies from Norcia and Foligno. The city resisted, and subsequent conflicts followed. Vitaliano of Friuli entered the city through the mountain pass, sacked it, imprisoned a hundreds of citizens, and carried off significant spoils to Foligno, including the chains and bell clapper of the communal palace. In 1439 the Spoletans appealed to Pope Eugene IV, who sent Cardinal Vitelleschi to restore order. The fortress was returned on 10 January 1440, and Pirro was imprisoned in Castel Sant'Angelo, where he died. Amorotto Condulmieri was appointed rector.

In 1449 Pope Nicholas V visited Spoleto during a plague in Rome. On 12 February 1450 he approved the city statutes and later confirmed a truce between Norcia and Spoleto. He also expanded and embellished the fortress. In 1453 he opposed the campaigns of Everso degli Anguillara, who had allied with factions in Norcia, Spoleto, and Cascia.

In 1455 Callixtus III appointed his nephew, Cardinal Borgia, as duke of Spoleto. In 1474 uprisings occurred in Todi and Spoleto, and papal forces under Varano da Camerino and Braccio Baglioni restored order, though Spoleto was sacked.

Maurizio Cibo was appointed governor of Spoleto, Assisi, and Foligno by Innocent VIII. Conflicts with Terni and Cesi led to warfare in 1495 and 1496, including attacks and reprisals, until Pope Alexander VI intervened to halt further destruction. Lucrezia Borgia was appointed governor in 1499 and resided in the fortress.

=== Early Modern and Contemporary period ===
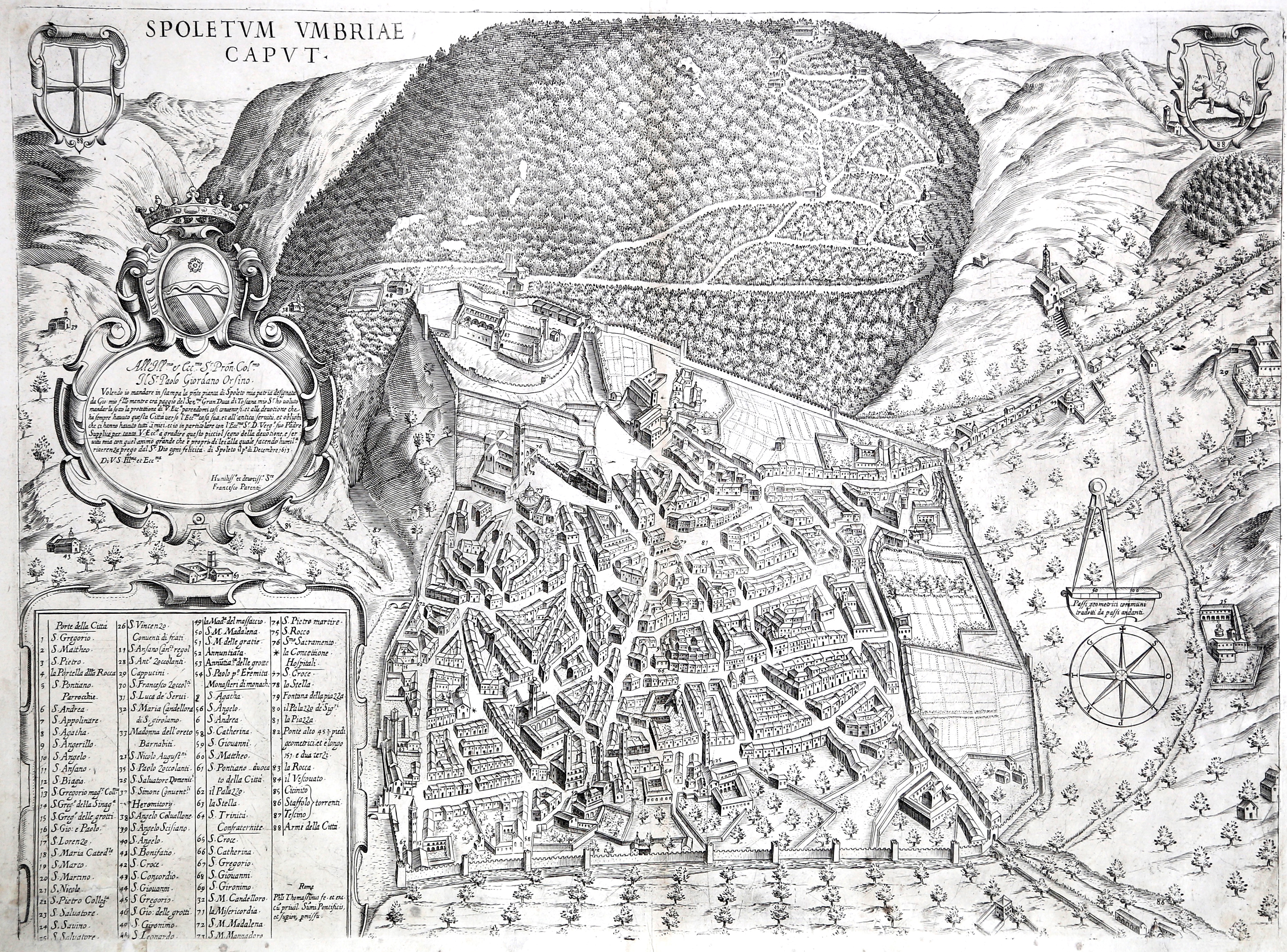
Panoramic view of Spoleto and the wooded slopes of Monteluco, c. 1600

In the early 16th century Spoleto supported Pope Julius II and later Pope Leo X in conflicts against the duke of Urbino. In 1526 and 1527 the Spoletans supported Pope Clement VII, attacking Subiaco and destroying the fortress of the Colonna family.

In 1552 Spoleto agreed to defend Cesi, but in 1568 Pope Pius V removed Cesi from its authority. In 1577 Gregory XIII arranged exploitation of iron mines in the territory and recovered various Umbrian localities for the Apostolic Camera.

The city suffered damage from an earthquake in 1667.

In 1782 Pope Pius VI visited Spoleto while traveling to Vienna, having previously aided the city after earthquakes. Further assistance followed additional earthquakes in 1785. Reclamation works begun in 1780 drained the territory between Perugia, Spoleto, and Trevi.

Under French rule the city became the seat of the department of Clitunno, and later, under Napoleon in 1808, capital of the department of Trasimeno. In 1800 Pope Pius VII passed through Spoleto after the first restoration of papal authority. After Napoleon's fall, in 1814 it returned to the Papal States and became the seat of the Delegation of Spoleto, later merged with that of Rieti in 1827 and separated again in 1831.

In 1860 Spoleto was annexed to the Kingdom of Italy. Spoleto had a population of 21,539 inhabitants in 1881.

== Geography ==
Spoleto lies on the western slope of the Apennine chain, on a hill that rests against Monte Luco and reaches a height of 453 metres (1,486 ft) above sea level at the fortress. From the approach from Foligno, the city rises in tiers along the steep hillside, with its buildings crowned by bell towers, domes, and towers, above which the medieval fortress dominates.

Approaching from the direction of Rome, after ascending Monte Somma, which rises to 852 metres (2,795 ft) above sea level and bears remains of a temple of Jupiter Summanus, the city appears prominently.

The city occupies a strategic position along routes connecting central Italy, which contributed to its long-standing military and political importance.

The walls are in part washed by the small river Tessino. At the foot of the hill on which the city stands begins the wide plain known as the Umbrian Valley, which extends as far as the Tiber beneath Perugia and is rendered highly fertile by the abundant waters that irrigate it. The surrounding landscape includes valleys and watercourses that historically required management to prevent flooding, especially in the lower-lying areas affected by the Marroggia and other streams.

The city is built on uneven ground. At its eastern summit stands the Rocca. Below it to the east lies a deep valley separating the city from Monte Luco, a higher wooded elevation covered with holm oaks, oaks, and strawberry trees. Monte Luco takes its name from lucus, a sacred wood once dedicated to the goddess Feronia.

About 3 miles (4.8 km) to the northeast stands Monte Agliano, a peak of the Apennines covered with beech trees and containing white and variegated marble.

=== Subdivisions ===
The municipality includes the localities of Acqualacastagna, Arezzola, Azzano, Baiano, Bazzano, Belvedere, Beroide, Borgiano, Camporoppolo, Camposalese, Carbognano, Casal di Mezzo, Cascinano, Case di Terraia, Case Vecchie, Casenove, Casigliano, Cese, Colle Campanaro, Colle Fabbri, Colle San Tommaso, Colleferretto, Cortaccione, Croceferro, Crocemarroggia, Eggi, Fabbreria, Fogliano, Francocci, Il Palazzo, La Bruna di Spoleto, La Costa, La Fornace, L'Osteriaccia, Madonna di Baiano, Madonna di Lugo, Meggiano, Messenano, Milano, Molinaccio, Montebibico, Monteluco, Montemartano, Ocenelli, Osteria di Palazzaccio, Perchia, Petrognano, Pincano, Pompagnano, Poreta, Protte, Rapicciano, Roselli, San Beroide, San Brizio, San Filippo, San Giacomo, San Giovanni, San Giovanni di Baiano, San Gregorio, San Martino in Trignano, San Sabino, San Silvestro, Santa Maria, Santa Maria in Campis, Sant'Anastasio, Sant'Angelo in Mercole, Sant'Angioletto, Silvignano, Spoleto, Strettura, Terraia, Terzo la Pieve, Terzo San Severo, Testaccio, Torrecola, Torricella, Uncinano, Valle San Martino, Vallocchia, Vicinato.

The small village of Arezzo di Spoleto also falls within the municipality of Spoleto.

In 2021, 5,416 people lived in rural dispersed dwellings not assigned to any named locality. At the time, the most populous locality was Spoleto proper (18,811). The following localities had no recorded permanent residents: Frazione Castagnacupa, Morro.

== Economy ==
The territory of Spoleto was fertile in antiquity and continued to sustain agricultural production. Its wine was particularly esteemed. Land reclamation efforts in earlier periods improved agricultural capacity by draining marshlands.

In the mid-19th century, Spoleto possessed numerous manufactories, including wool production, silk spinning mills, tanneries, dye works, factories for alcohol, pitch from pine, candles, printing works, brick and tile kilns, and goldsmithing. A local savings bank was established in 1836.

Industrial activity included lignite mining developed between 1880 and 1886. The mines were located in hills to the north-west near Morgnano, Santa Croce, San Silvestro and Sant'Angelo in Mercole, and were operated by the Company of Blast Furnaces, Foundries and Steelworks of Terni. Extraction was carried out through underground works accessed by shafts of 37 metres (121 ft), 47 metres (154 ft) and 53 metres (174 ft) depth.

In the 1940s, Spoleto was one of the principal cement-producing centers in Umbria, hosting a factory of the Società degli Alti Forni di Terni. The town also had cotton and woollen mills and formed part of the region's textile industry. In the food sector, Spoleto was one of the main centers for olive oil pressing. It also contributed to small-scale pasta production and other local food industries.

== Religion ==
=== Cathedral ===
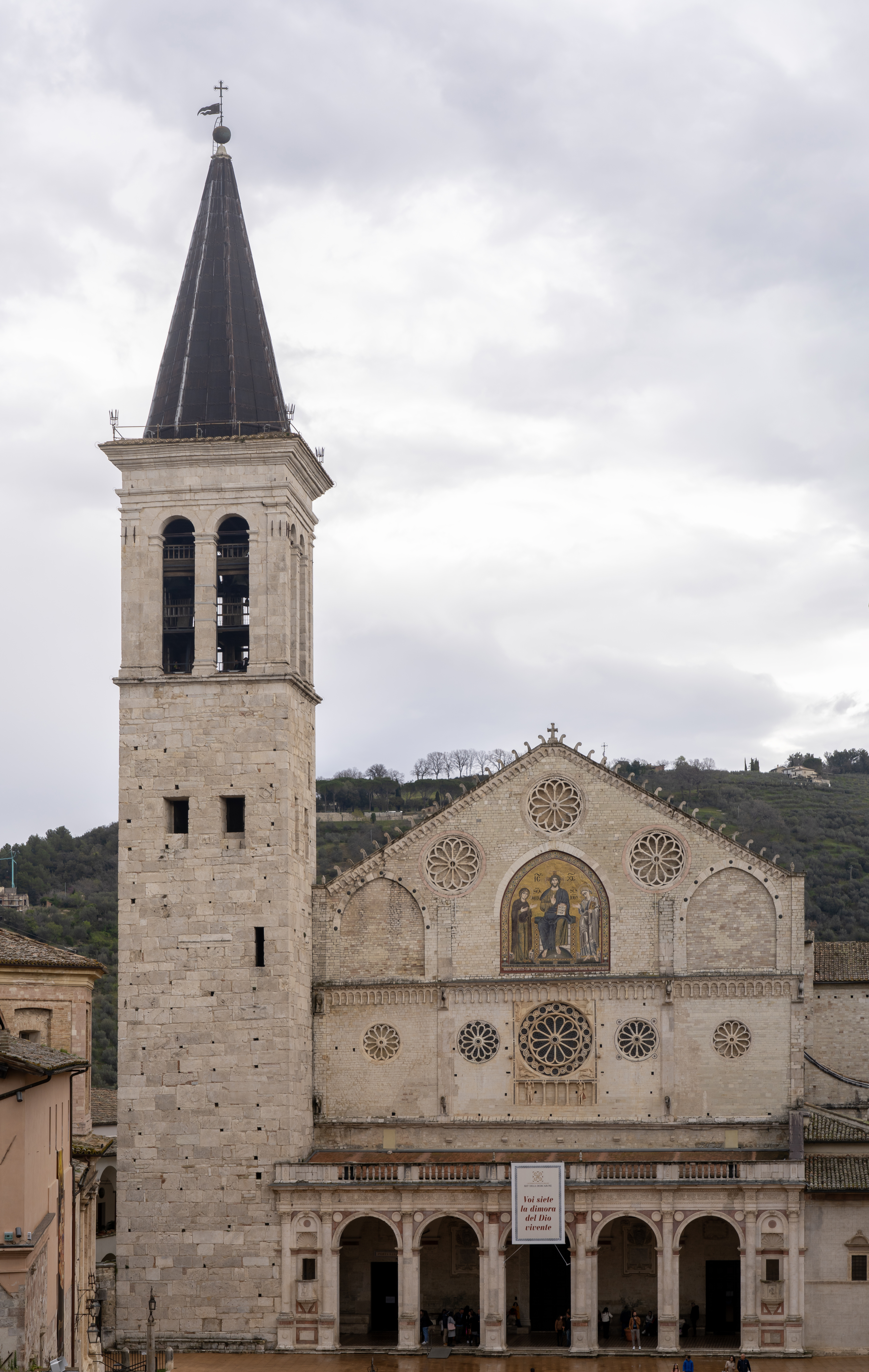
Cathedral of Santa Maria Assunta

The Cathedral of Spoleto existed as the church of Santa Maria in the first half of the 11th century, built on the site of an earlier church dedicated to Saint Primiano. It was destroyed in 1155 during the sack of the city by Barbarossa and was subsequently rebuilt and consecrated again in 1198 by Pope Innocent III. In the 17th century Pope Urban VIII, formerly bishop of Spoleto, remodeled the interior with the work of Bernini.

The bell tower stands to the right of the façade and is constructed of travertine blocks reused from Roman buildings, including inscribed stones, cornices, friezes, and column shafts. Its upper part dates to 1515 and was built by Ciono di Taddeo. One bell bears an inscription indicating its casting in 1306 by Joes de Perusio.

The façade is articulated by pilasters and cornices, with sculptural decoration including symbolic animals and reliefs of the Annunciation. A large central window is framed by mosaics and reliefs of the Evangelists. Above, three arches include a mosaic depicting Christ enthroned, with the Virgin and Saint John, set against a gold background with vegetal ornament.

The portico, attributed to masters Ambrogio di Antonio da Milano and Pippo di Antonio da Firenze, dates to the 16th century. Within it is the chapel of Francesco Eroli, with frescoes and paintings including works by Jacopo Siciliano. The baptismal font, largely of the 16th century, is carved in stone.

The interior retains portions of the original pavement in the central nave. Numerous artworks are present, including paintings by Gandolfi, Cavallucci, Annibale Carracci, and others, as well as sculptures by Tiberio Fidi da Cerreto. The apse preserves frescoes including the Coronation of the Virgin and other scenes, with contributions by Filippo Lippi and his workshop.

A monument erected by Lorenzo de' Medici commemorates Filippo Lippi, who died in Spoleto in 1469. Opposite stands the monument to Francesco Orsini, with an additional funerary monument to Bishop Fulvio Orsini.

The chapel of the Santissima Icone houses a revered icon brought from Constantinople and given to the city by Frederick Barbarossa. The Eroli chapel, dated 1497, contains frescoes attributed to Pinturicchio or his school, as well as a painted cross on parchment mounted on panel.

The church also houses a manuscript letter by Saint Francis of Assisi.

=== San Salvatore ===
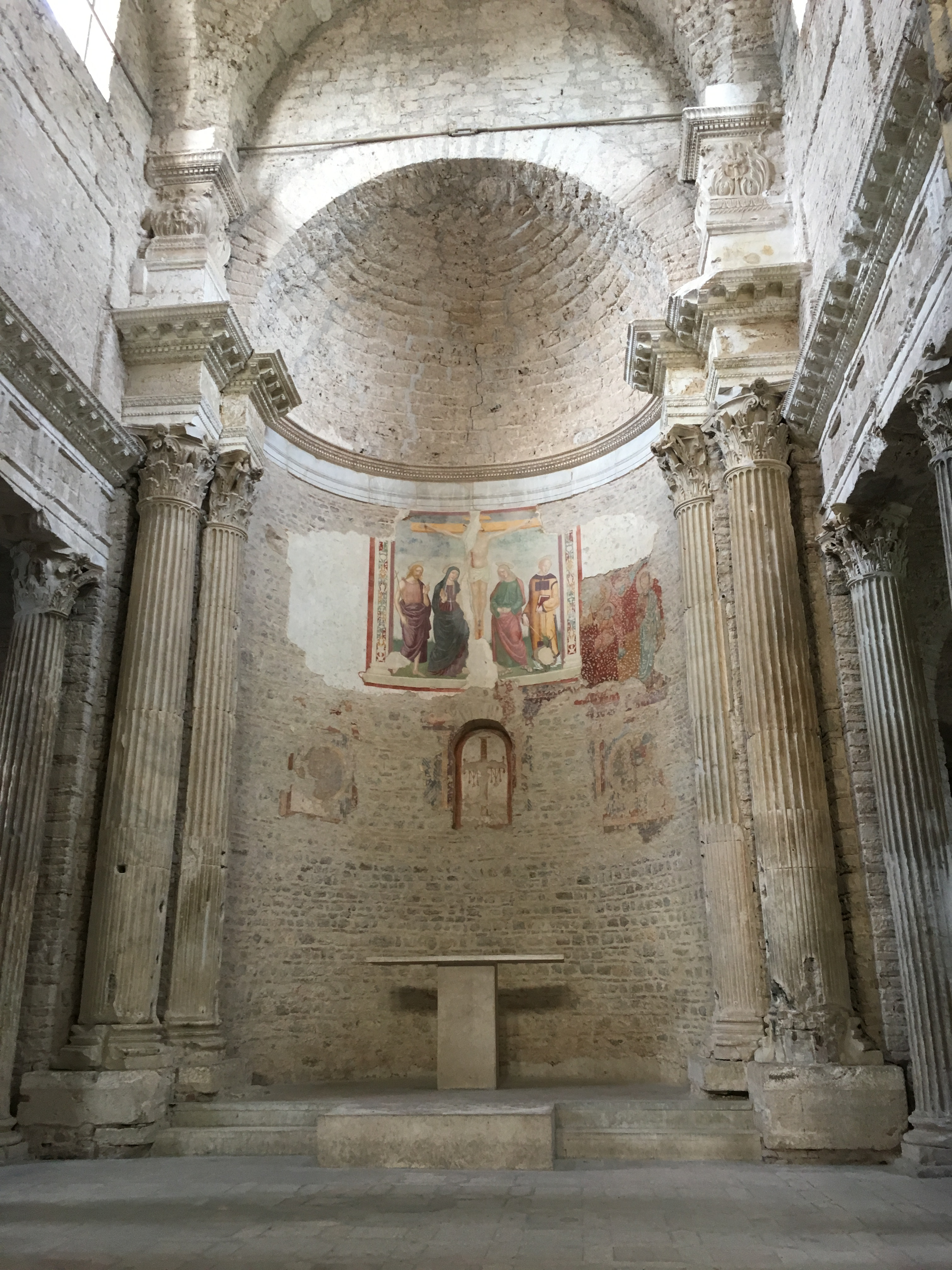
Interior of the Basilica of San Salvatore

The Basilica of San Salvatore is an early Christian building erected between the late 4th century and the early 5th century. The Basilica stands on Colle Ciciano, outside the medieval walls of the city. It has forms compared with those of the Temple of Clitumnus, combining classical art with eastern influences. Of the original basilica and its earliest transformations, only the apse, presbytery, façade, and numerous reused elements taken from a Roman sanctuary of the Doric order remain.

The rebuilding carried out in the 8th century under the Lombard dukes of Spoleto gave the church a more unified architectural character, both in the structure marked by the columns of the nave and presbytery and in the revival of Roman decorative models.

The façade, restored in 1997, is divided into two levels. The lower level has three marble portals with lintels decorated with vegetal motifs, constructed largely from classical materials. The upper level has three large windows, the lateral ones with pediments and the central one arched.

The interior has three naves, once divided by high fluted Doric spolia columns that supported a trabeation. Toward the triumphal arch are visible the original elements from which the trabeation began; over the centuries this was replaced by arcades supported by piers and columns. At the end of the naves are three apses, the lateral ones square and the central one semicircular. The presbytery, with a square plan, is structurally distinct from the central nave and preserves its original trabeated form: at the four corners stand pairs of high fluted Corinthian spolia columns supporting sections of trabeation, above which rises a ribbed dome set on decorated corbels.

In the center of the apse, within a niche, is a painted jeweled monogrammatic cross, together with traces of painted imitation marble revetment belonging to the earliest decoration. Higher up are a fragmentary 13th-century fresco of the Madonna and Child with a saint and, beside it, a 16th-century Crucifixion of the school of Lo Spagna. The walls and the two side chapels contain frescoes of the 14th and 15th centuries.

The church was originally dedicated to Saint Concordius. In the 8th century, following Lombard rebuilding, it took the name of San Salvatore from an image of Jesus Christ placed above the high altar. In the 11th century it resumed its earlier dedication, which lasted until the 17th century, and in the 18th century further renovation was carried out, including the addition of the dome lantern. Its present appearance derives from 20th-century restorations that removed later alterations and restored the title of San Salvatore. In 2011 it became a UNESCO World Heritage Site as part of the serial site Longobards in Italy: Places of Power (568–774 A.D.).

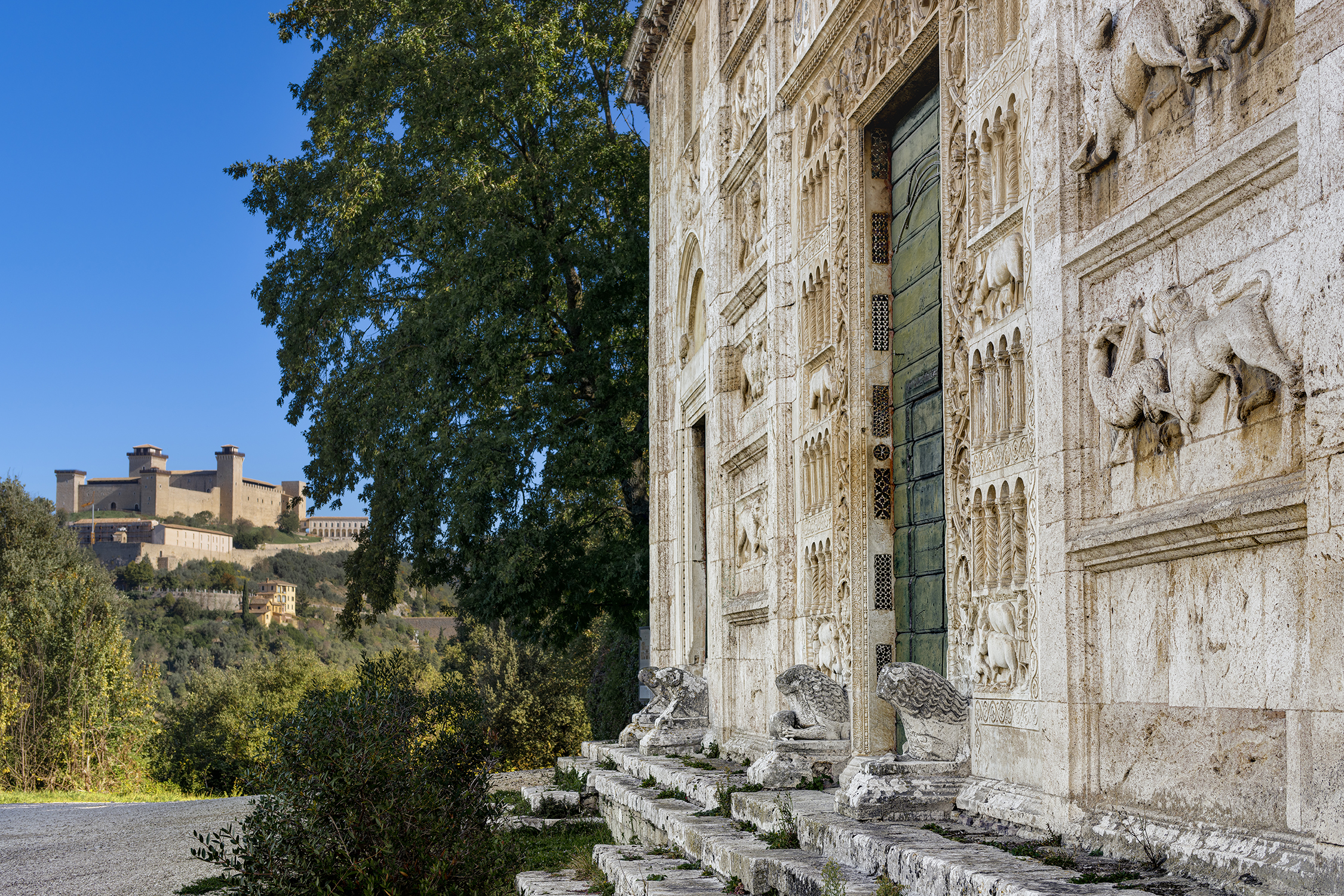
Main door to Church of San Pietro, Albornozian Fortress (Rocca Albornoziana) in the background

=== San Pietro extra moenia ===
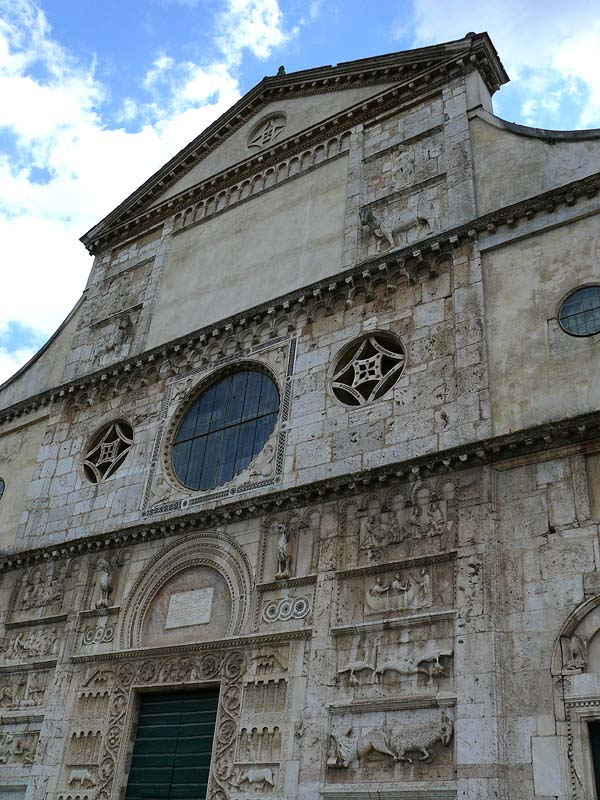
San Pietro church, façade

The church of San Pietro, located outside the city, is an ancient collegiate church with a baptistery, restored in 1740. It houses the bodies of Saint Peter, bishop of Spoleto, and Saint John, archbishop.

The church was founded in 419 to house the chains that supposedly once bound St. Peter. It was built over an ancient necropolis. It was reconstructed from the 12th to the 15th century, when a Romanesque façade was added with three doors with rose-windows, with relief decoration by local artists, portraying stories of the life of St. Peter. The church is fronted by a large staircase. In the 17th century the interior was refurbished in Baroque style, with a basilica plan with a nave, two aisles, and an elliptical dome.

=== Santi Giovanni e Paolo ===
The church of Santi Giovanni e Paolo preserves above its ancient entrance a fresco of the Virgin seated with four saints, a work of the 12th century. In the sacristy there is a fresco of the Virgin with the Child, two angels in the act of crowning her, and various saints, considered to be the work of Jacopo Siciliano.

A narrow staircase leads down to the underground oratory. Along the main wall runs a band with polychrome ornamental frescoes, while on the wall are depicted three scenes from the lives of Saints John and Paul. The first shows the emperor Julian the Apostate seated on a curule chair, issuing an order to a figure identified as Terentius, prefect. The second shows the martyr saints opening the golden gates of heaven. The third depicts the saints thrown to the ground, with Saint John already beheaded and the executioner raising a dagger to strike Saint Paul. These paintings date between the 10th and 11th centuries. The altar table is ancient, and until recent times it supported two 12th-century iron candlesticks, now lost. There is also a primitive wooden altar.

The interior frescoes, from the 13th–15th centuries, include some of the most ancient representations of the martyrdom of St. Thomas Becket (painted by Alberto Sotio), and of St. Francis.

=== Sant'Ansano ===
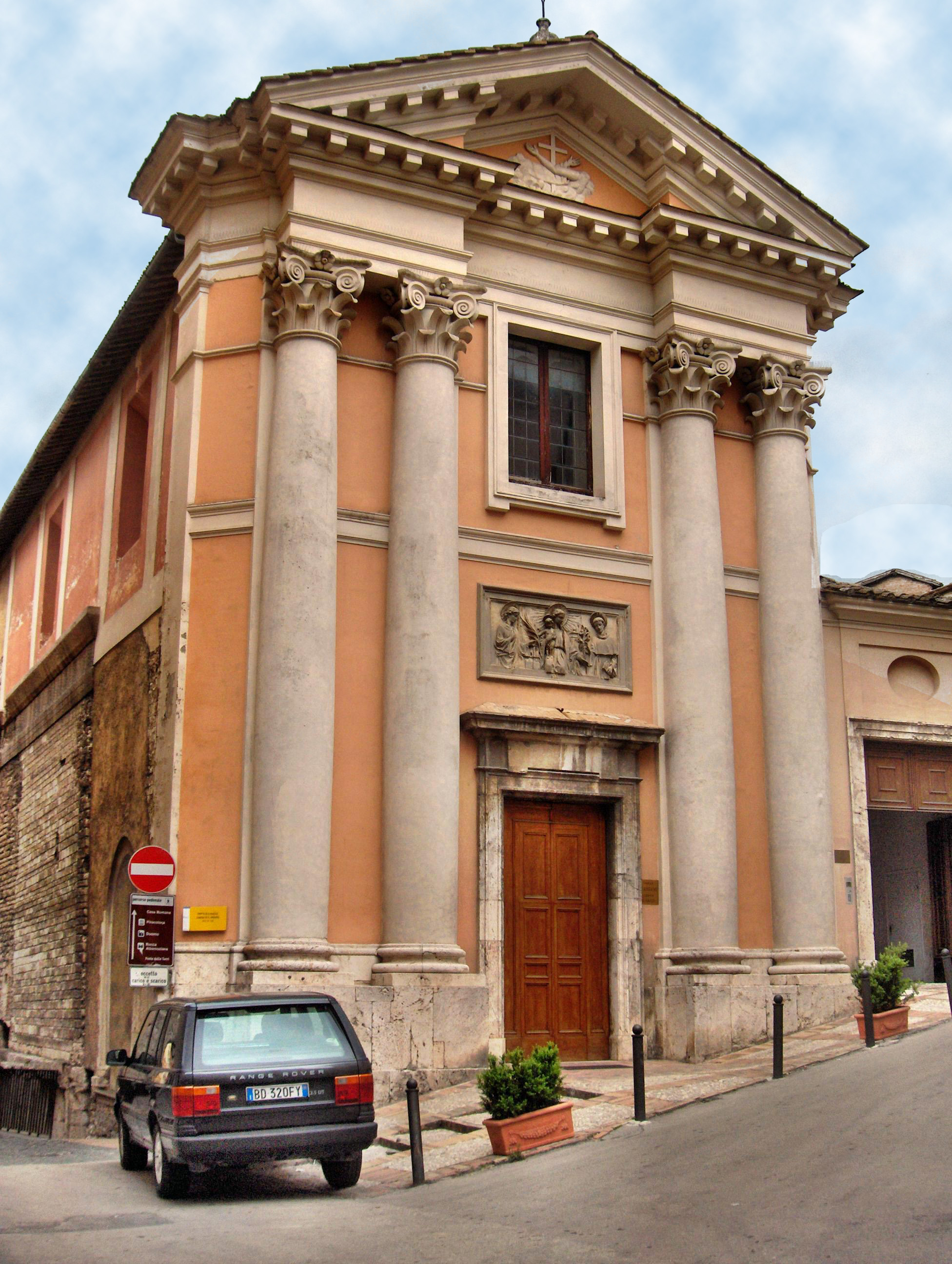
Church of Sant'Ansano

The Church of Sant'Ansano preserves a fragment of a cornice frieze in a fine Greco-Roman style on the exterior wall above the entrance to the parish house; it belonged to an ancient temple that once stood on the site. The exterior was entirely modernized with the exception of a fine 12th-century stone frame enclosing a lunette.

Inside, on the left wall, is the Martyrdom of Saint Lawrence, an oil painting recalling the Neapolitan school of the 17th century. On the wall of the high altar is the Martyrdom of Saint Ansano, another oil painting of the Venetian school from the 17th century. On the right wall, behind the painting of the first altar, is a fresco of the Virgin seated holding Jesus with angels, attributed to a pupil of Lo Spagna.

The crypt was formerly an external church and remained so until a Roman arch, connected with a church dedicated to Saint Isaac and Saint Martial, anchorites, was uncovered. On the architrave of the narrow entrance to the crypt is a fresco of the Virgin with Jesus and an angel. The interior has three naves; of the six columns in the central nave, four belonged to a Roman monument, and the vaults are cross-vaulted. The structure as a whole dates to the 6th century.

In the third bay to the left of the apse are frescoes of the Saviour seated beside a veiled figure, possibly Mary, to whom he offers two crowns, along with fragments of two shepherds and a holy anchorite. In the fourth bay appear Christ enthroned and crowned by two angels, a saint with the inscription "Martial", two heads of anchorites, a saint restraining a ram by its horns, two young hermits, and a shepherd among a flock. The fifth bay shows a supplicant figure led by another. The sixth bay shows a winged angel holding a cloth, and below an aged anchorite with the martyrdom of a holy hermit. The seventh bay depicts a banquet with ten figures seated at a table bearing loaves marked with crosses and a large fish, while a man receives bread from another. The ninth bay shows ten armed figures in chain mail advancing under a leader, with fragments of five others and a saint. These frescoes date to the 11th century.

The church occupies the site of a former temple of Mars, with notable ancient remains. Nearby stands a partially buried arch of Greek style associated with Germanicus and Drusus.

=== San Domenico ===
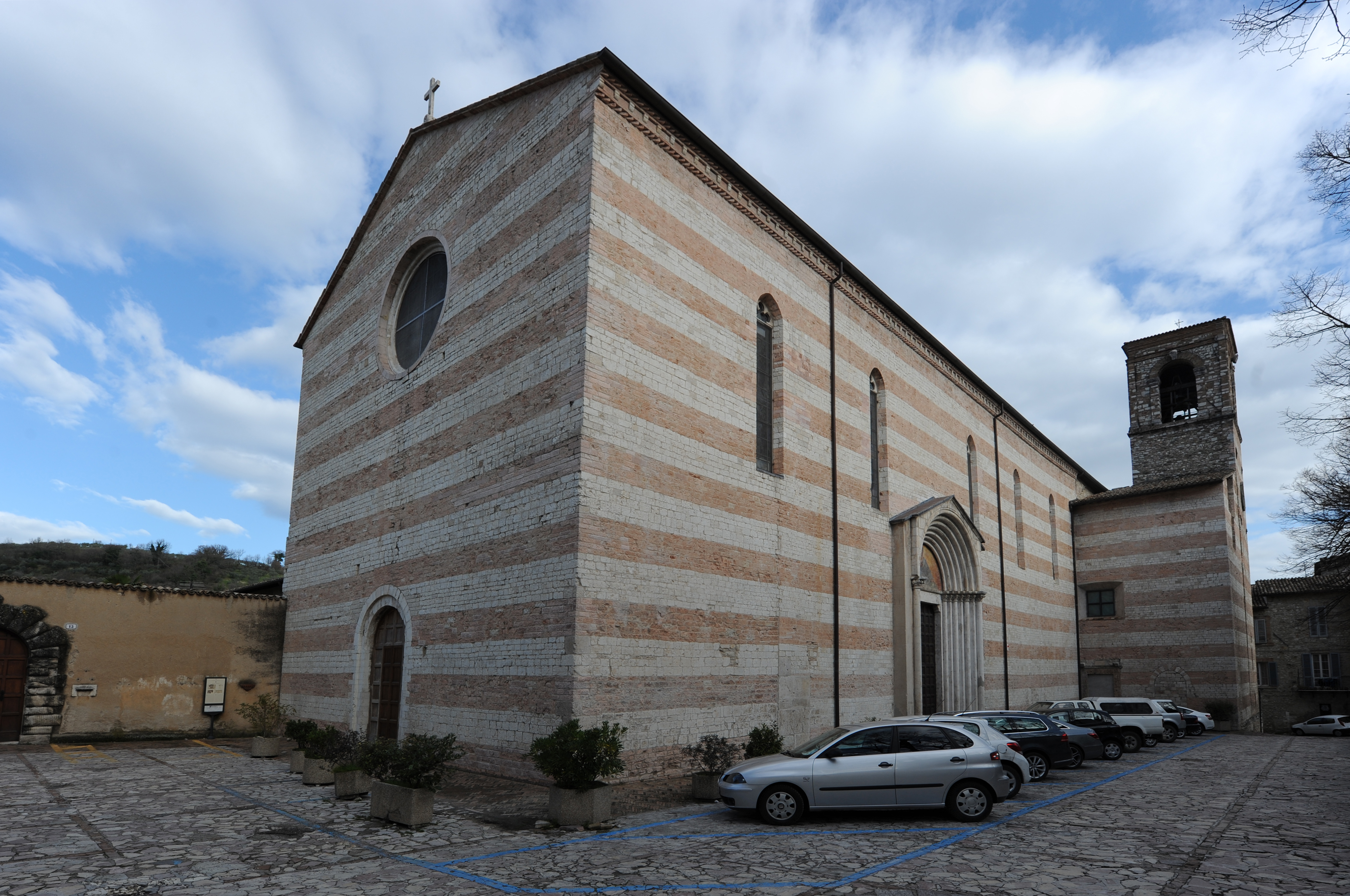
The church of San Domenico

The church of San Domenico was built in the early 15th century and is decorated with large bands of white and reddish limestone. It has the form of a Latin cross, and the south side remained unfinished. On the east wall is a door above which, within a semicircular arch, is a fresco of Christ blessing with an inscription dated 1591.

The interior has a single nave, restored in such a way as to remove traces of antiquity. On the left wall, the first altar holds an oil painting of Mary in glory with Saint Dominic and Saint Brictius, attributed to Francesco Refini of Spoleto, a pupil of Pietro da Cortona. There are also remains of frescoes depicting God communicating a holy nun, a 15th-century work, and Jesus in conversation with the Virgin, a 16th-century painting damaged by poor restoration. A copy of Raphael's Transfiguration above the third altar was executed by Giuseppe Cesari.

In the left transept are remains of 15th-century frescoes with Saint Dominic and Mary. In the apse is Saint Thomas Aquinas. In an ancient chapel to the right of the apse, the semicircular vault is decorated with frescoes, with a central figure of Christ blessing and holding a book.

On the wall opposite is a Calvary scene rich in figures and varied expressions, recalling the school of Foligno of the early 15th century. Beneath later whitewash was discovered a scene with 13 figures representing a baptism, and above it the Raising of Lazarus. In the right transept is an oil painting signed by Giovanni Lanfranco depicting the Virgin, Jesus, Saint Anne, Saint Clare, and Saint Helena.

Beneath the apse is a crypt, now separated from the church, largely decorated with votive paintings from the 14th to the 16th century by local or Umbrian painters. These include Saint Lawrence, a Dominican saint, Saint Ponzianus, Saint Dominic, Saint Sebastian, the Annunciation, and Saint John. In one vault appear Pope Urban V and Saint Dominic. Another wall shows the Virgin with the Child enthroned, Saint Jerome, and Saint Primianus with an inscription dated 1400. At the entrance is Mary with Jesus and the Annunciation, dated to the tenth year of the pontificate of Boniface IX (1398). Another vault shows Christ seated with a sword and book, dated 1397, and above, the Virgin between angels, with members of the Company of the Discipline kneeling below.

Near the crypt to the south-west was a large cloister, where the entrance to the ancient chapter house remains, finely built and carved in travertine and marble in the 15th century. Adjacent stood the church of San Pietro Martire, now a drawing school, containing a large fresco by Lo Spagna of the Crucifix surrounded by saints against a landscape with mountains and the city of Spoleto.

=== San Gregorio ===
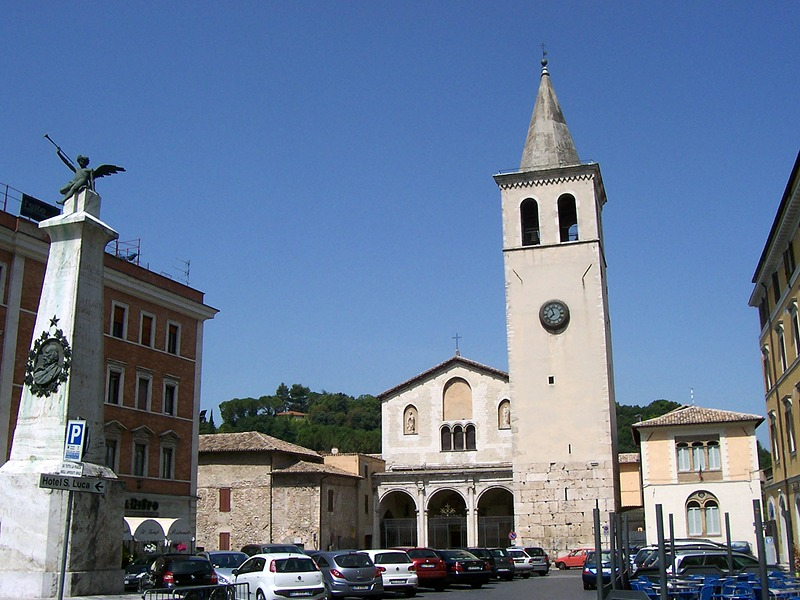
San Gregorio Maggiore

The church of San Gregorio Maggiore was consecrated in 1146 and restored in 1597, when the three-arched portico was added, ending on the left in a slightly earlier chapel. The vault is decorated with frescoes of the Evangelists by Umbrian artists of the late 16th century. Three entrances lead into the church, and above the left one is a symbolic sculpture of the 5th century.

The interior has a basilical form, though heavily altered. At the head of the naves are two 15th-century holy water stoups. In the left nave, the third altar has an oil painting of Saint Joseph with the Child, attributed to Conca.

Before the presbytery, steps descend to the crypt, which has five small naves and was built in the 11th century of cut limestone, lit by narrow slit windows. Steps lead up to the presbytery, where the high altar stands, richly decorated with marble.

The church is associated with Saint Gregory, martyred in 303 under Diocletian. Beneath it are catacombs formed between the 6th and 7th centuries, containing the remains of numerous martyrs gathered by Saint Abundia, as well as the tomb of Piceuzia and relics of Saints Lawrence, Teudila, and Paratale.

Remains identified as those of a prison are visible near the church.

=== Manna d'Oro ===
The church of the Manna d'Oro stands in the cathedral square and was erected as a votive temple in 1527, when the city remained unharmed despite the presence of the army of Charles V devastating nearby territories. The building has an octagonal plan with harmonious proportions reflecting the school of Bramante. Inside are a Rest on the Flight into Egypt attributed to Conca, a Nativity of Mary by the same artist, and a Presentation and an Annunciation by Costantini di Spoleto, a pupil of Conca.

The church is currently an exhibition hall.

=== San Nicolò ===
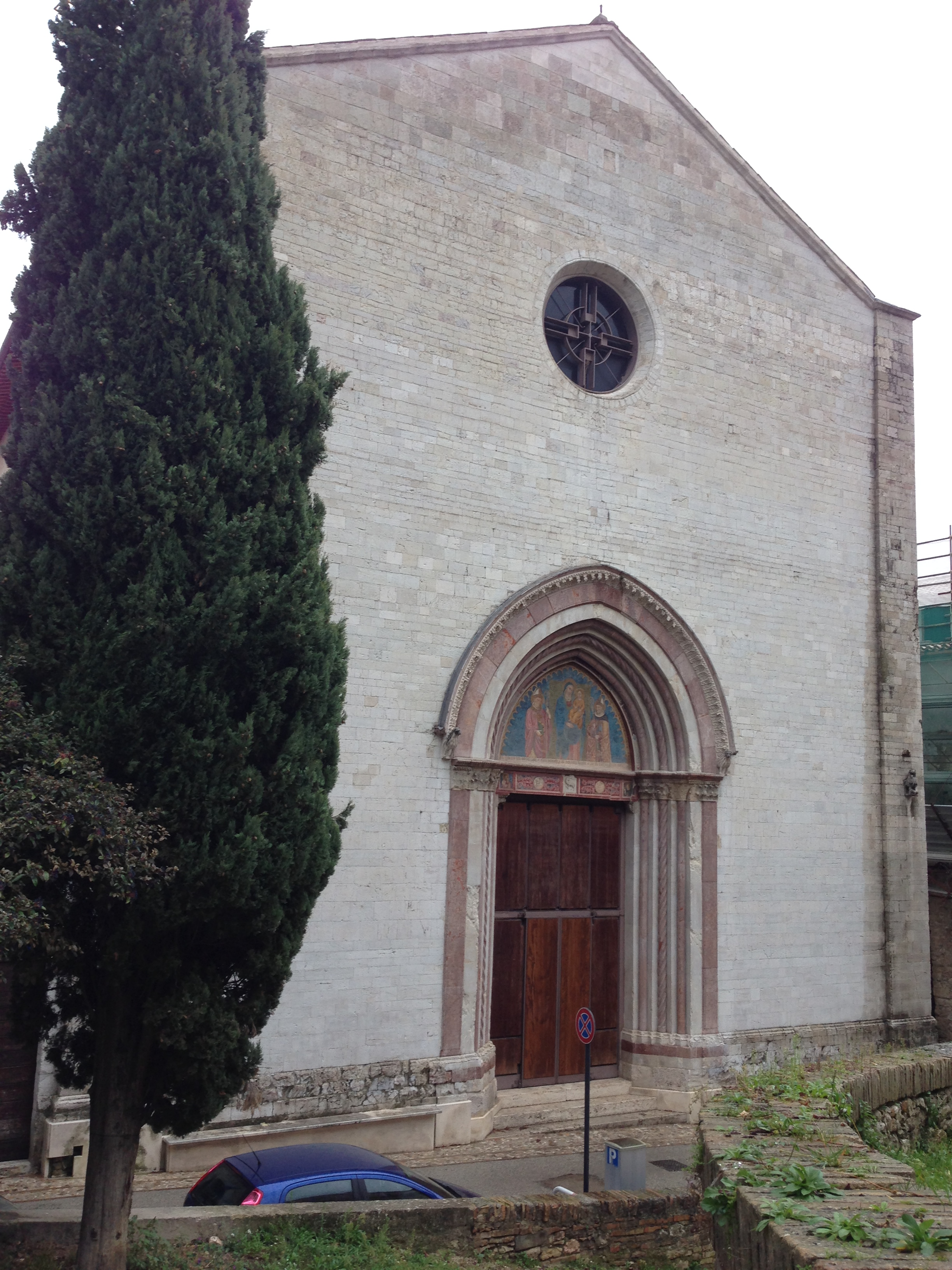
Church of San Nicolò

The former church of San Nicolò was destroyed by fire in 1819, leaving only the outer wall and apse. It had been a large and notable 14th-century church. The façade has a decorated base and pilasters rising to the cornice, with two lions holding dragons at about two-thirds of their height. In the lunette above the entrance is a fresco of the Virgin with the Child and two bishops, with an inscription dated 1402.

Inside, on the entrance wall, are frescoes of the Crucifix, a reading saint, Saint Lucy, God blessing among angels, and Saint Benedict, all from the 15th century. On the left wall is a chapel with a vault fresco of the Coronation of the Virgin and angels, and on the wall the Death of the Virgin, dated 1492. The apse has an elegant gallery and three large double windows. In a chapel near the presbytery is a fresco attributed to Jacopo Siciliano of Mary with the Child in glory, Saint Peter, and Saint Benedict.

=== Sant'Eufemia ===
The Church of Sant'Eufemia, also known as Santa Lucia, has an interior with three naves supported by masonry piers incorporating Roman and Byzantine elements and ancient marble columns. In the left nave is an Annunciation painting from the late 16th century, and in the main apse are remains of frescoes dated 1559. Above the present vaults are preserved parts of the original structure, including matronea built with reused architectural fragments. The lower parts of the three apses are visible in the former archiepiscopal prison. The church is held to be of particular importance for the study of early Christian art in Umbria.

In the old chancery is a 14th-century fresco depicting the main court of the archiepiscopal palace.

=== Santa Maria della Stella ===
The former church and convent of Santa Maria della Stella include a first cloister built between 1507 and 1509 and a second cloister of 1508 with a double loggia on two sides. A stone bench with an elegant balustrade runs along the walls, and the doorways are finely designed. In the former dormitory is a stone shrine with a fresco of the Virgin with the Child, Saint Brictius, and Saint Peter Martyr, dated 1530 and associated with Lo Spagna or his school. Many artworks from the convent were transferred to the municipal gallery.

The monastery contained paintings by Campilli di Spoleto and Étienne Parrocel.

=== Convent of San Giovanni ===
The convent of San Giovanni contains in the choir an oil painting on the wall of the Entombment of Christ from the 17th century. The ancient church, long used as a warehouse, preserves frescoes by followers of Giotto depicting Saint Benedict, Saint Scholastica, and Christ blessing. Lower sections contain frescoes of various dates including the Virgin with the Child enthroned, Saint Dominic, Saint Catherine, the Nativity of Saint John the Baptist, the Beheading of Saint John, Saints Placidus, Benedict, and Maurus, and Saint Scholastica. In the former choir is a large Calvary scene by an artist of Foligno from the 15th century.

=== Hermitages of Monte Luco ===
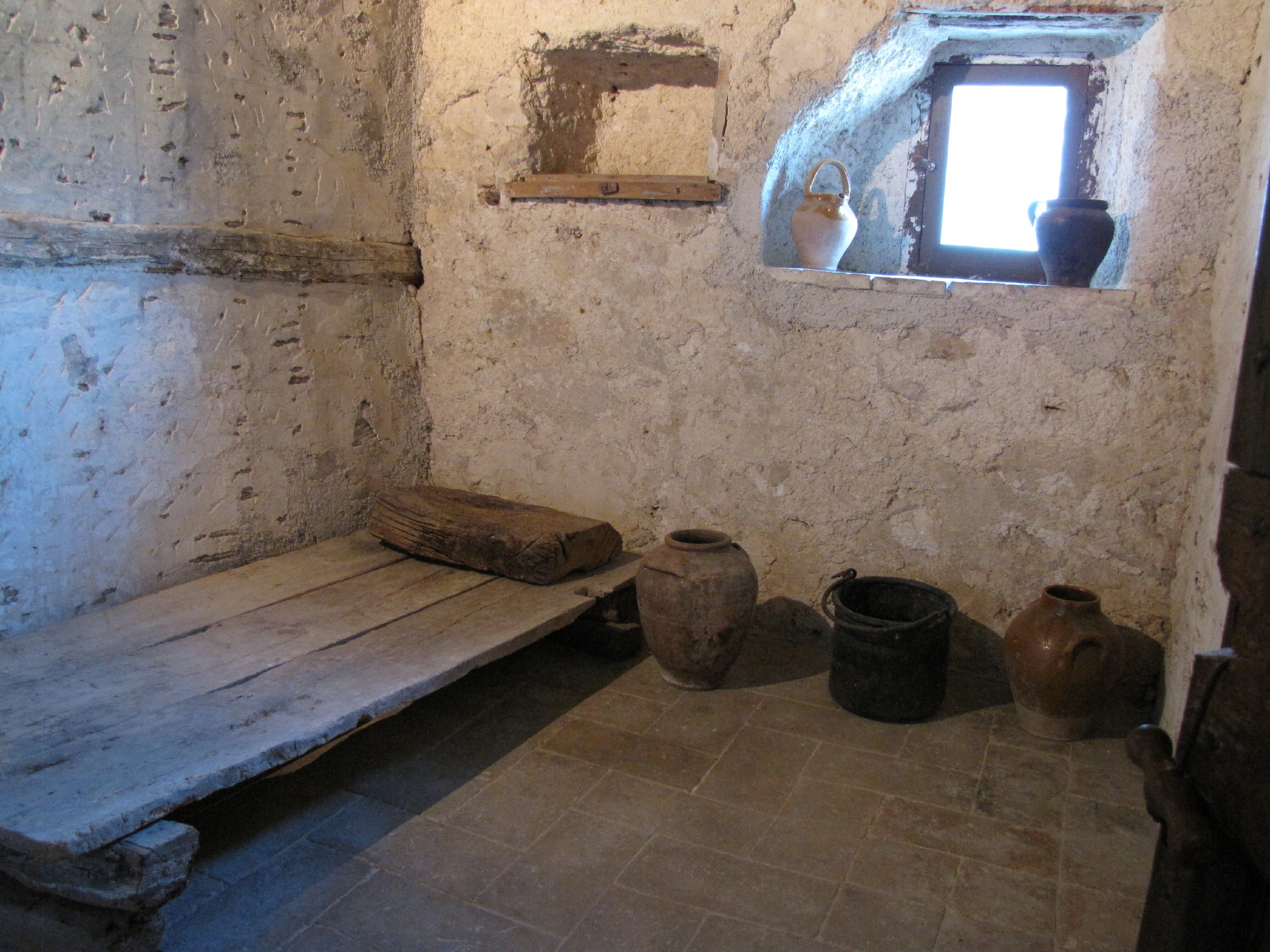
13th-century eremitic cell at the Hermitage of San Francesco

Monteluco (or Monte Luco) is covered with dense woodland of holm oaks, with tradition holding that a temple of Apollo once stood there. In the Roman period it was a lucus (or sacred wood). From the 5th century, hermits fleeing Syria settled on the mountain, establishing early communities linked to Isaac the Syrian and later ascetic traditions. These developments gave rise to a network of hermitages and religious buildings that continue to define the site.

At Monteluco stands the Hermitage of San Francesco, whose origins lie in 1218 when Francis of Assisi received the small chapel of Santa Caterina from Benedictine monks. The complex includes the ancient oratory, the Well of San Francesco, the chapel of Santa Caterina d'Alessandria linked to the 6th century Syrian hermits, and the chapel of San Bernardino built ten years after the saint's death. Nearby, the church of Santi Francesco d'Assisi and Caterina d'Alessandria preserves works including paintings by Lazzaro Baldi, Carlo Dolci, and Ercole Gennari.

=== Other religious buildings ===
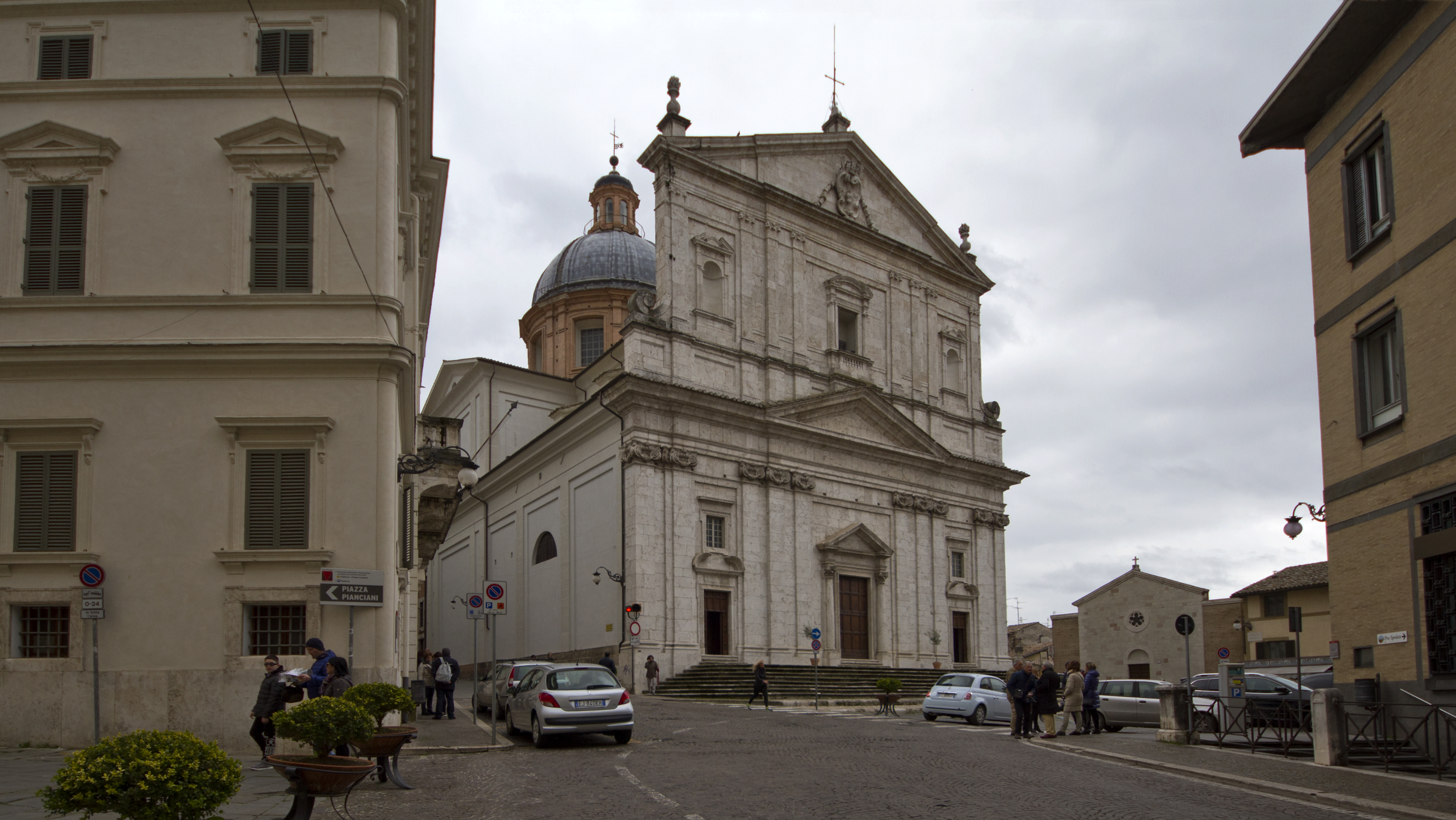
Church of San Filippo Neri

The church of San Filippo Neri was built in the first half of the 17th century. It has three naves with a dome and a grand façade entirely of travertine in the style of the period. It contains a Holy Family by Conca and a Christ on the cross between John and Mary by Gaetano Lapis. The columns of green antique marble adorning the altars of the crossing were taken from those of the porticoes of the Temple of Clitumnus.

The former Church of San Giovanni Decollato features an entrance framed by an elegant semicircular stone arch, above which sits a lunette decorated with ornamentation on a yellow background. The wall once bore a painting of the Entombment of Christ from the school of Luca Signorelli, now in the municipal gallery. Inside are remains of a fresco of Saint Peter Martyr from the 15th century and another of the Presentation of Christ in the Temple, from a Tuscan school of the same century.

The church of San Lorenzo has a shaped doorway and above it a double-light window, both works of the 14th century. Inside, on the left wall, is a tempera panel of Saint Roch from the Umbrian school of the late 15th century. On the wall opposite the entrance are frescoes of the same period depicting Saint Francis receiving the stigmata, Saint Jerome, Mary Magdalene, and Saint John the Baptist.

The church and convent of the Passion contain, on the right altar, a tempera panel of the Madonna of the Conception with Saint Concordius and Saint Brictius, a work by Rainaldi transferred from the convent of the Stella. In the convent, near the workroom, is a triptych depicting Christ appearing to the Virgin, the angel bringing her the palm, the Assumption, the Virgin dying in the arms of Christ, and the Entombment of Mary, a finely executed work of a 14th-century miniaturist.

The convent of the Most Holy Trinity has in its refectory a large fresco divided into three sections depicting Christ, God the Father and the Holy Spirit, the Assumption of the Virgin, angels, sibyls, and various saints. In the washroom area there remains a large section of polygonal walls from the most ancient circuit of the city.

The church of Sant'Andrea stands on the site believed to have been a temple of Jupiter.

The church of the Most Holy Crucifix, located north of the city, is identified with the former temple of Concordia.

The church of San Simone contains the skull of Saint Anthony of Padua and paintings of the Giotto school, with frescoes in the cloister from the school of the Zuccari.

The church of Santa Maria Maddalena contains a painting by Guercino.

The underground church of San Brizio reportedly contains notable artistic works.

The church of Madonna di Loreto is reached through a long portico and includes the chapel of the Counts Campello with paintings by Baglioni.

The church of the Filippini is adorned with a dome and fine marbles. It contains works by Conca, Lapis, and Vanni, including a depiction of the Holy Family.

The former church of Santa Caterina has an interior vault bearing a large fresco of Christ blessing, with half-length figures of the Evangelists at the sides, a work of the school of Lippi.

San Ponziano is a monastery and 12th–century Romanesque church standing outside the city's walls, dedicated to the patron saint of Spoleto. The church was modified in later centuries by Giuseppe Valadier. The crypt, however, has remained untouched, with its five small naves and small apses with cross-vault, ancient Roman spolia columns and frescoes of the 14th–15th centuries.

The church of San Paolo inter vineas is a 10th century Romanesque church with rose-window of the façade.

The church of Santi Simone e Giuda is a 13th-century church completed in 1280 that has undergone many restorations and losses.

== Culture ==
=== Rocca albornoziana ===
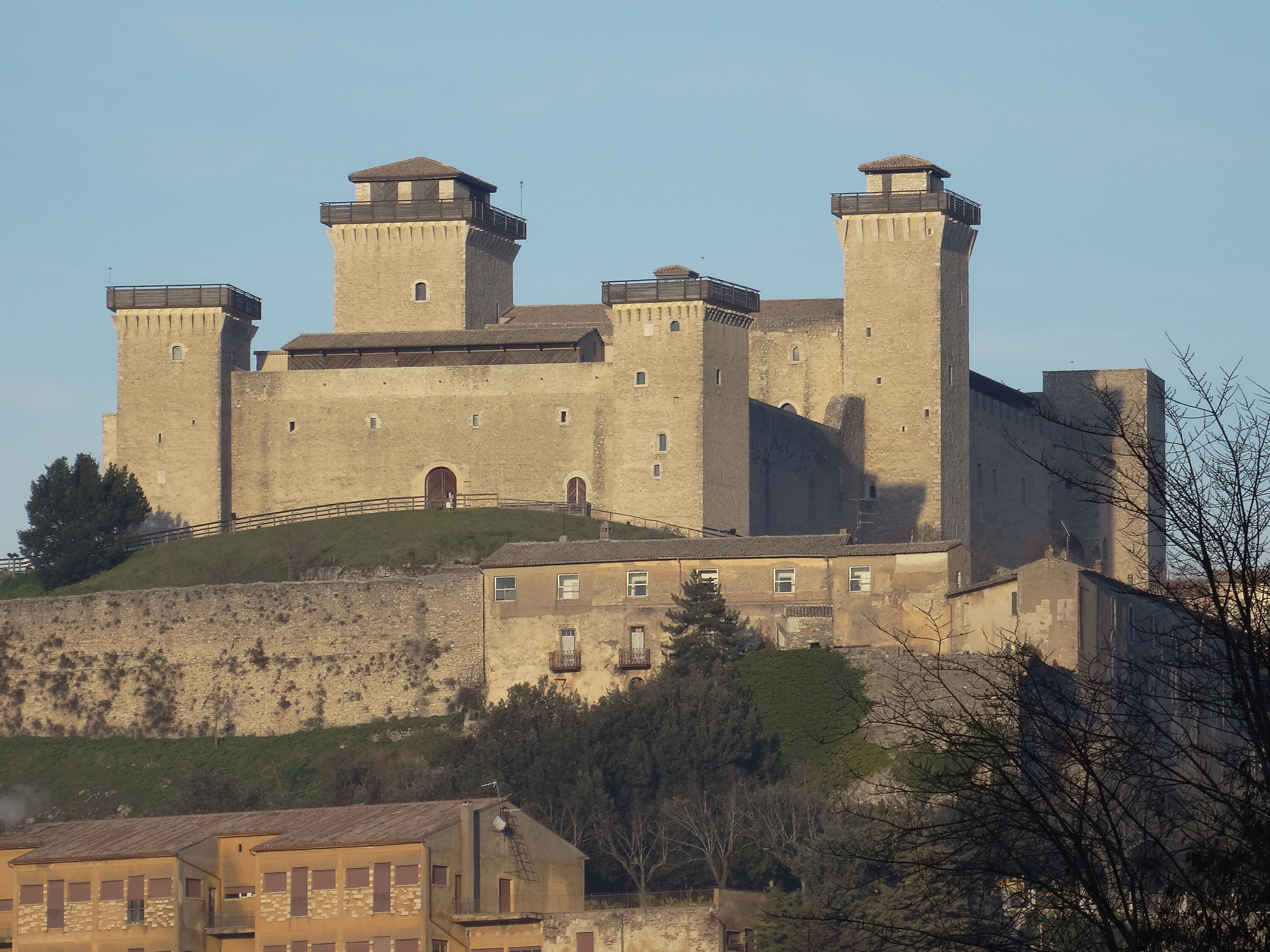
The Rocca Albornoziana

The Rocca albornoziana stands on the summit of the hill of Sant'Elia. It was built beginning in 1359 at the will of Pope Innocent VI and takes its name from Cardinal Albornoz, who entrusted the direction of the works to Matteo Gattapone. Blasco Fernandez was appointed as castellan.

The plan is rectangular, with six towers on corbels, and the interior is divided into two courts by a central block. To the north lies the Corte delle Armi, intended for military functions, and to the south the Corte d'Onore, used for residential and representational purposes.

Until the mid-18th century the fortress housed the papal governors and other leading figures of the period. In 1499 it also housed Lucrezia Borgia as governor of the duchy. During the 16th and 17th centuries the building entered a period of decline. From 1764, when the governors moved into the city, the first alterations to the original structure began. In 1817 it became a prison, and the increase in prisoners led to the construction of an additional block. It remained a prison until 1983, after which it underwent restoration.

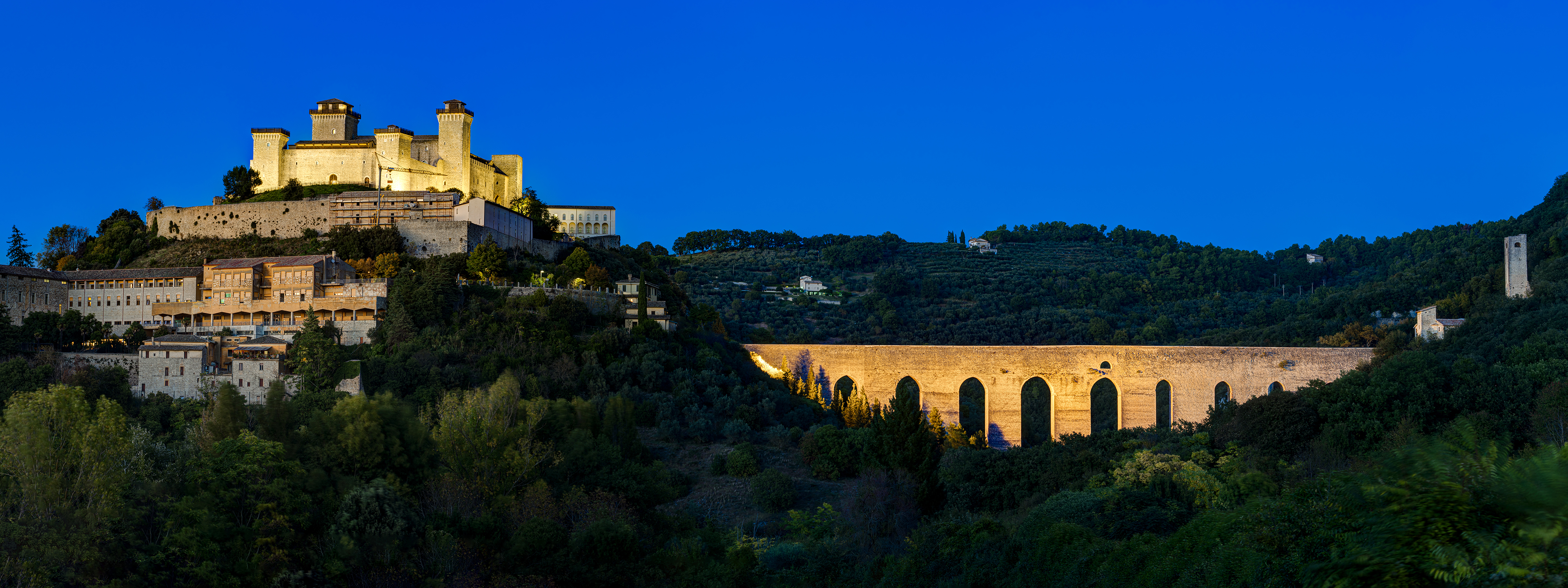
Rocca Albornoziana and Ponte delle Torri, Spoleto

The restoration brought to light painted decoration dating from the late 14th century to the 18th century. Inside the main tower is the Camera Pinta, frescoed between 1392 and 1416 with courtly and chivalric scenes. Around the Corte d'Onore runs a two-level portico entirely in terracotta, containing 16th- and 17th-century celebratory frescoes, as does the Salone d'Onore. At the center of the courtyard is a Renaissance well flanked by two pillars with brackets; on the lintel is carved the coat of arms of Pope Nicholas V.

The main courtyard features a double portico with arches resting on polygonal pillars. A cistern with a hexagonal wellhead bears carved ecclesiastical emblems and an inscription. An upper loggia is reached by a staircase in the north-west corner, and its walls retain decorative paintings recalling the governors. Frescoes by Giovanni Spagna formerly located there were later transferred to the municipal gallery.

The site may have hosted earlier fortifications, possibly used by Greeks, Goths and Lombards, and a stronghold likely existed there before the period of internal conflicts.

==== Museum of the Duchy of Spoleto ====
The Museum of the Duchy of Spoleto is housed inside the Rocca, and documents the history of the Duchy of Spoleto, established by the Lombards in the 6th century.

Arranged in 15 rooms, it contains works spanning from the 4th to the 15th century, including material from the earliest Christian communities, evidence relating to monasticism, works from the 6th to the 9th century showing artistic developments in the territory, and sculpture and painting from the 12th to the 15th century.

=== Ponte delle Torri ===
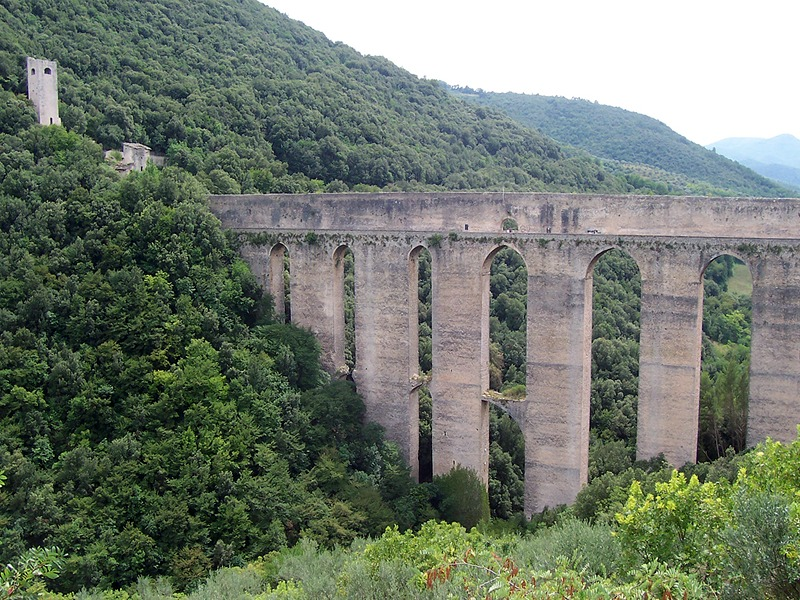
Ponte delle Torri

The Ponte delle Torri is a bridge of local limestone about 230 metres (750 ft) long and 80 metres (260 ft) high, linking the hill of Sant'Elia with Monteluco. Its construction is not securely documented, but it was probably built between the 13th and 14th centuries. Its present appearance dates to the mid-14th century, when the area underwent extensive changes as part of the building initiatives promoted by Cardinal Albornoz under the direction of the architect Matteo Gattapone.

The bridge had a double purpose: to connect the Rocca on the hill of Sant'Elia with the fortilizio dei Mulini on Monteluco, and to bring into the city the waters of the springs of Cortaccione. Its masonry consists of nine piers joined by pointed arches. The two highest piers are hollow like towers and probably served as guard posts. The foundations of the two central piers suggest an earlier structure, dated either to the Roman period or to the 12th century. Some arches were demolished as early as 1390 and rebuilt in masonry in 1639, while two others were entirely rebuilt in brick in 1845.

The Fortilizio dei Mulini served as the guard point of the aqueduct, where the waters fed two municipal mills before being conveyed along the bridge. From this point begin the Giro dei Condotti and numerous paths toward the mountains around Spoleto.

=== Palazzo Comunale ===
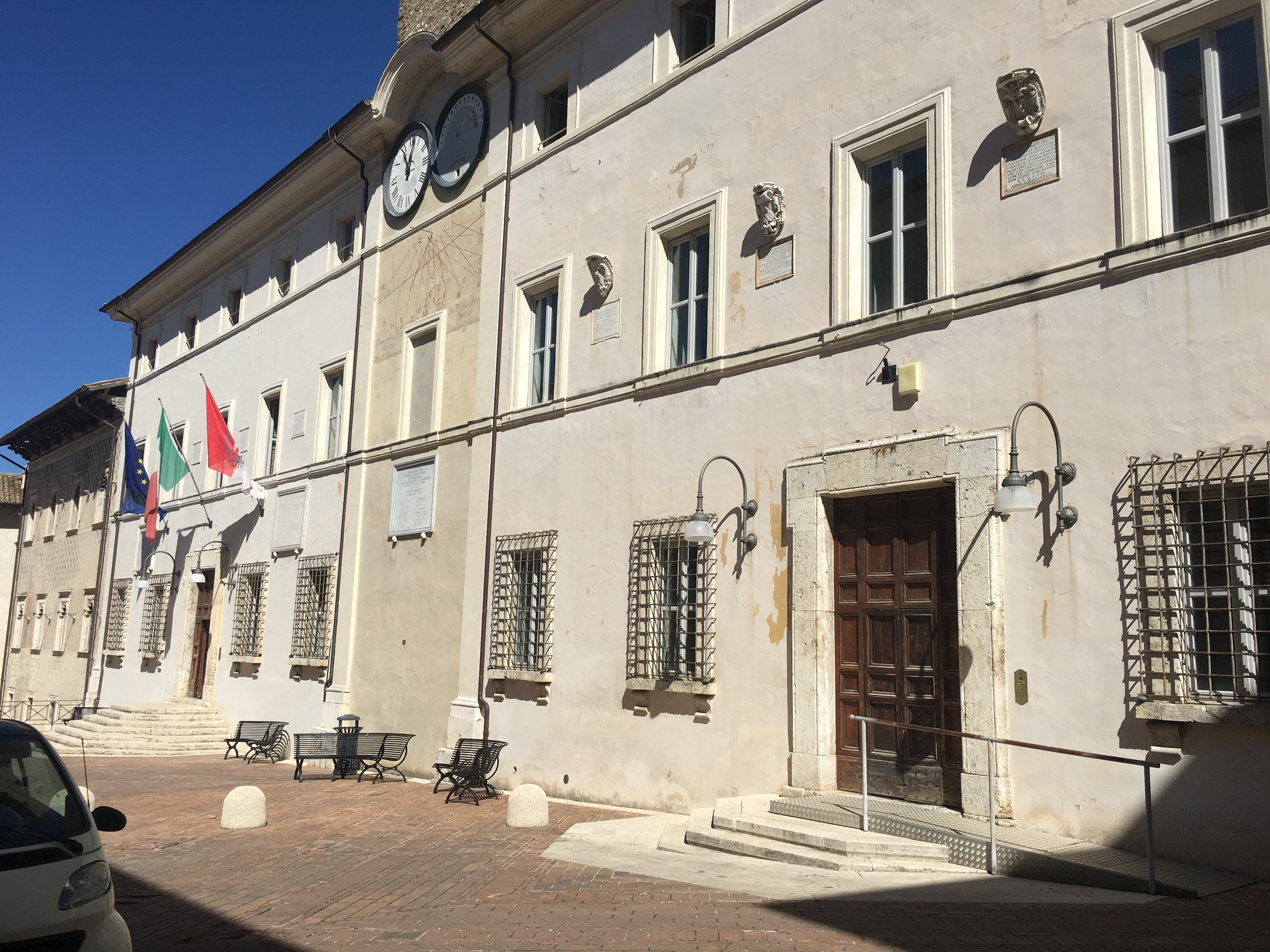
Palazzo comunale

The Palazzo Comunale is a large building equipped with a tower dating to the 10th or 11th century, which serves as a bell tower. In its atrium, various ancient Roman inscriptions and architectural remains were collected by the municipality.

The building houses a picture gallery containing numerous works of art. Among them is a large fresco depicting the Virgin seated with the Child standing on her knees, surrounded by Saint Jerome, Saint Anthony, Saint Catherine and Saint Brictius, a work by Giovanni Spagna transferred there in 1800 from the Rocca. Also present is a painting of Job suffering and mocked by his wife, attributed to Caravaggio. A detached fresco by Bernardino Campilli from 1502 shows God blessing between two seraphim, with the Virgin and Child below, and the episcopal palace with a bishop blessing from a loggia. Other works include a Penitent Magdalene by Guercino, a large sculpted stone tabernacle front with various scenes and a ciborium with adoring angels attributed to Benedetto da Rovezzano, and paintings of the Trinity and Saint Cecilia from the Carracci school.

There is also a detached fresco showing the Virgin enthroned with Jesus, Saint Augustine, Saint Lawrence and angels, dated 1530 and from the school of Lo Spagna, a portrait of Pope Pius VII by Camuccini, and fragments of frescoes with small angels by Spagna. Another fresco from the Rocca depicts allegorical figures including Faith and Charity, with Justice and angels above, executed by Spagna with his pupils. The collection further includes a 15th-century sculpture known as the Arca of the Holy Oil and a panel attributed to Antonello da Messina, signed by the artist and depicting the Virgin seated with the Child, framed in an ornate antique setting.

The council hall contains tempera panels formerly part of a triptych with Saint John the Baptist, Saint Peter and other saints from the Foligno school, another panel with the Virgin, Saint Anthony, Saint Bernardine and Saint Francis in the manner of Matteo da Gualdo, and a work showing Mary with Jesus, Saint Peter and Saint Paul influenced by Michelangelo's school. Additional works include the reliquary of Saint Eutychius from the 15th century, a sculpture of the Martyrdom of Saint Pontian, and a lunette decorated with lions, vines and foliage.

The collections also include numerous Etruscan and Roman artifacts, notably the important epigraphic monument known as the Lex Spoletina from a sacred grove.

=== Palazzo Collicola ===
Palazzo Collicola is one of the principal noble residences of the city and was built between 1717 and 1730 by Sebastiano Cipriani as the residence of the noble Collicola family. After the extinction of the family, the palace was acquired by the municipality of Spoleto in 1939.

On the ground floor is the Museo Carandente, which preserves works by Alexander Calder, Henry Moore, Ettore Colla, Nino Franchina, and Pietro Consagra. The piano nobile on the first floor preserves paintings dating from the 15th to the 20th centuries that were formerly housed in the municipal picture gallery.

=== Palazzo Arroni ===
Palazzo Arroni stands on the street descending to the cathedral and was used in the Middle Ages for assemblies of the municipality. It was built in the 16th century and has on its façade a large sgraffito frieze of the Triumph of Neptune attributed to Jacopo Siciliano or Giulio Romano. The portal is richly sculpted in a style recalling Sansovino, and the windows and loggias of the inner court are finely decorated. A large nymphaeum adorned with stucco and painting faces the entrance. A richly carved and gilded canopy was removed in the mid-19th century, causing damage to the decorations.

The interior is notable for its refined architecture. The chapel in the main quarters has a sculpted façade of the 16th century. A finely carved fireplace is preserved among the municipal collections.

=== Archiepiscopal Palace ===
The Archiepiscopal Palace stands opposite the municipal palace and contains artworks including a 15th-century tempera panel with a gold background depicting Saint Brictius, the Assumption of Mary surrounded by angels and apostles, and Saint Lucy, with a predella showing Christ, angels, and scenes from the life of Saint Lucy.

=== Roman Theater ===
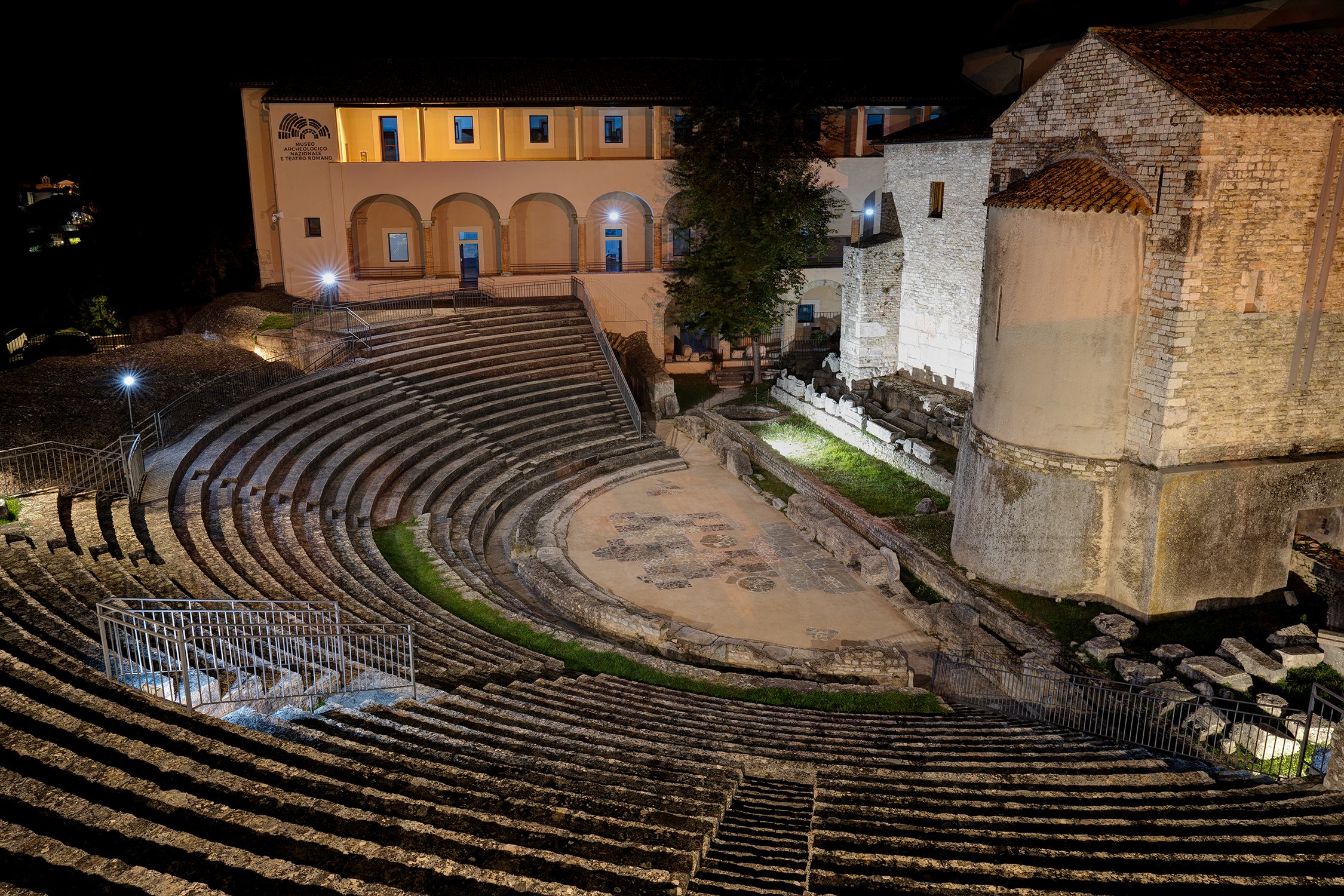
Roman Theatre (Teatro Romano) 1st century BC

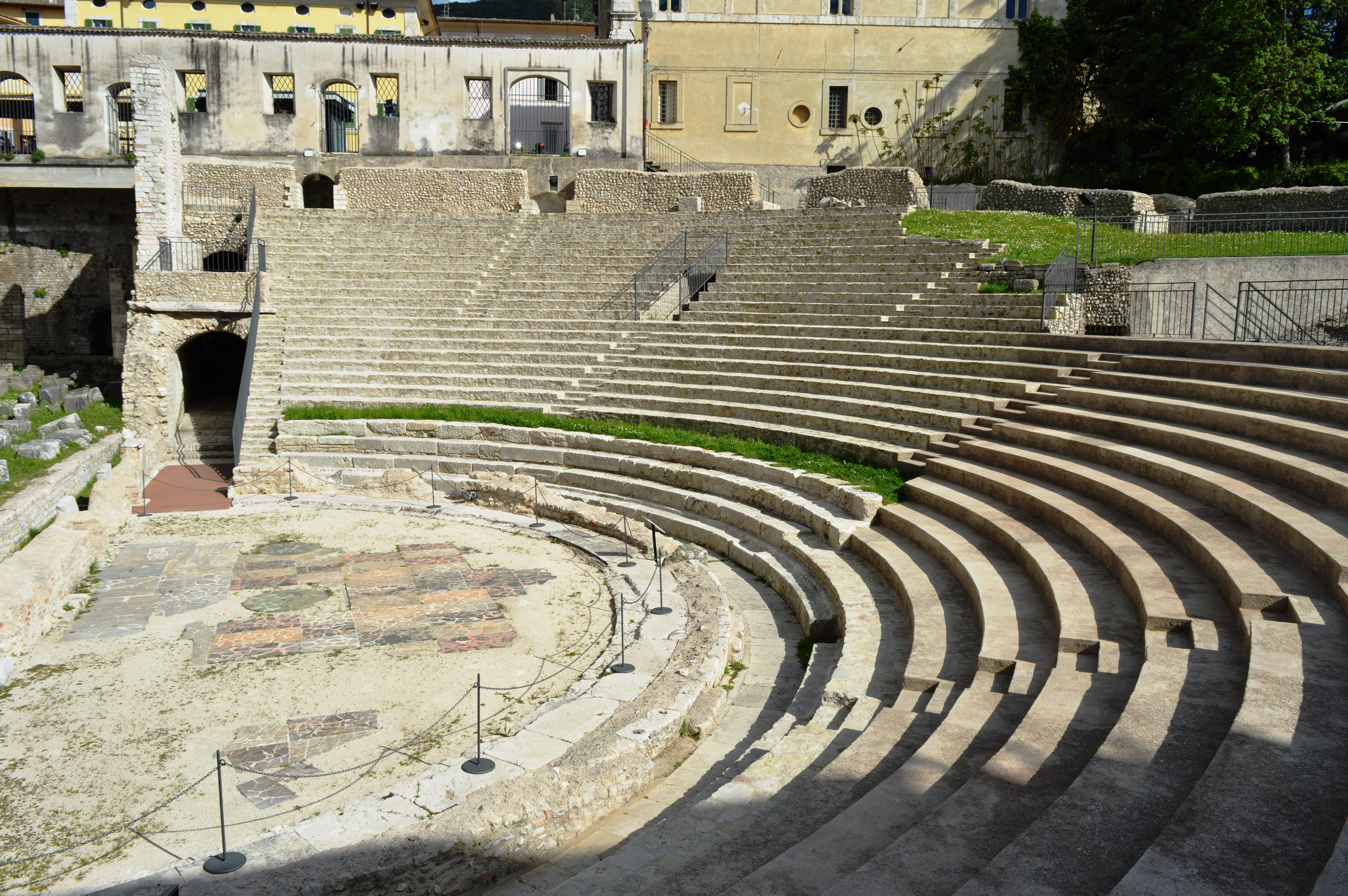
Roman theater

The Roman Theater, dating to the 1st century BC, is a major monument of Roman Spoleto. In 1395 it became the cloister of a Benedictine monastery and was brought to light only in the 20th century, after being identified in 1891 by Giuseppe Sordini through a 16th-century drawing locating it in the area of the convent of Sant'Agata.

The theatre was built on a large artificial terrace and has a diameter of about 70 metres (230 ft). It is enclosed by a semicircular ambulatory covered by a barrel vault, from which three entrances lead to the cavea, where spectators sat on the stepped seating.

==== Museo archeologico nazionale di Spoleto ====
The Museo archeologico nazionale di Spoleto preserves finds and evidence relating to the history of the city and its territory, with particular attention to the Valnerina. It is housed in the spaces of the former convent of Sant'Agata, a medieval complex built over the structures of the Roman theater.

One floor is entirely dedicated to the more recent excavation results from Spoleto, from the formation of the settlement on the hill of Sant'Elia in the Bronze Age to the development on the plain of the Latin colony of Spoletium. The museum also presents materials found in excavations of the theater, including honorary portraits and sculptures connected with its decoration.

=== Ancient walls ===
Remains of polygonal walls from the Umbrian-Etruscan period are preserved in several parts of the city. A notable segment stands on the hill of Sant'Elia, forming part of the outer wall of the Rocca on the south side, near the gate leading to the bridge of the Towers. This segment is constructed of large irregular polygonal stone blocks, measures about 15 metres (49 ft) in length and 4.22 metres (13.8 ft) in height, and has a thickness of 1.05 metres (3 ft 5 in), composed of two rows of blocks.

Additional remains of these ancient walls are visible in various parts of the city, including via Monterone, near the former church of San Nicolò, and in via delle Felici, allowing the plan of the early fortifications to be traced.

Restorations of the primitive walls were carried out toward the end of the Roman Republic in the area of the present gardens of Falconi and Fortunati by the quattuorviri Publius Marcius Histrio and Gaius Maenius Rufus, as attested by an inscription that still survives.

=== Roman forum and temples ===
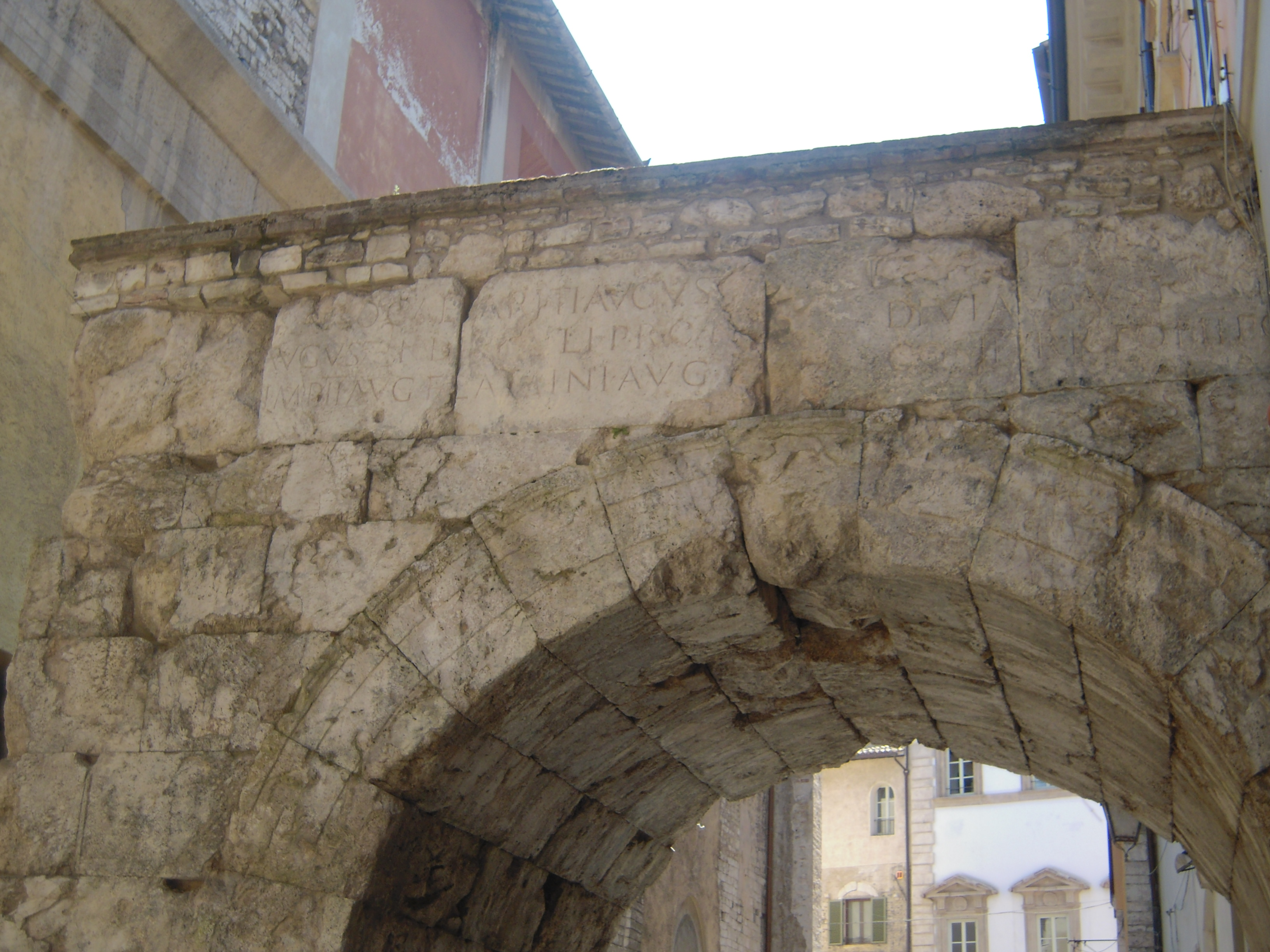
Inscription on the arch of Drusus

The Via Flaminia entered the city through a gate whose remains stand at the head of borgo Monterone. Not far beyond this entrance, in a leveled area, lay the forum, together with surrounding buildings of which remains survive.

To the right of the entrance, on the site now occupied by the church of Sant'Ansano, stand remains of a Roman temple, believed by some to have been dedicated to Mars. Near the temple stands an honorary arch with Corinthian-style pilasters, erected to Germanicus and Drusus, as indicated by inscriptions.

In via della Basilica, near the municipal palace, a substantial remnant of another temple is preserved.

=== Sacred grove of Monte Luco ===
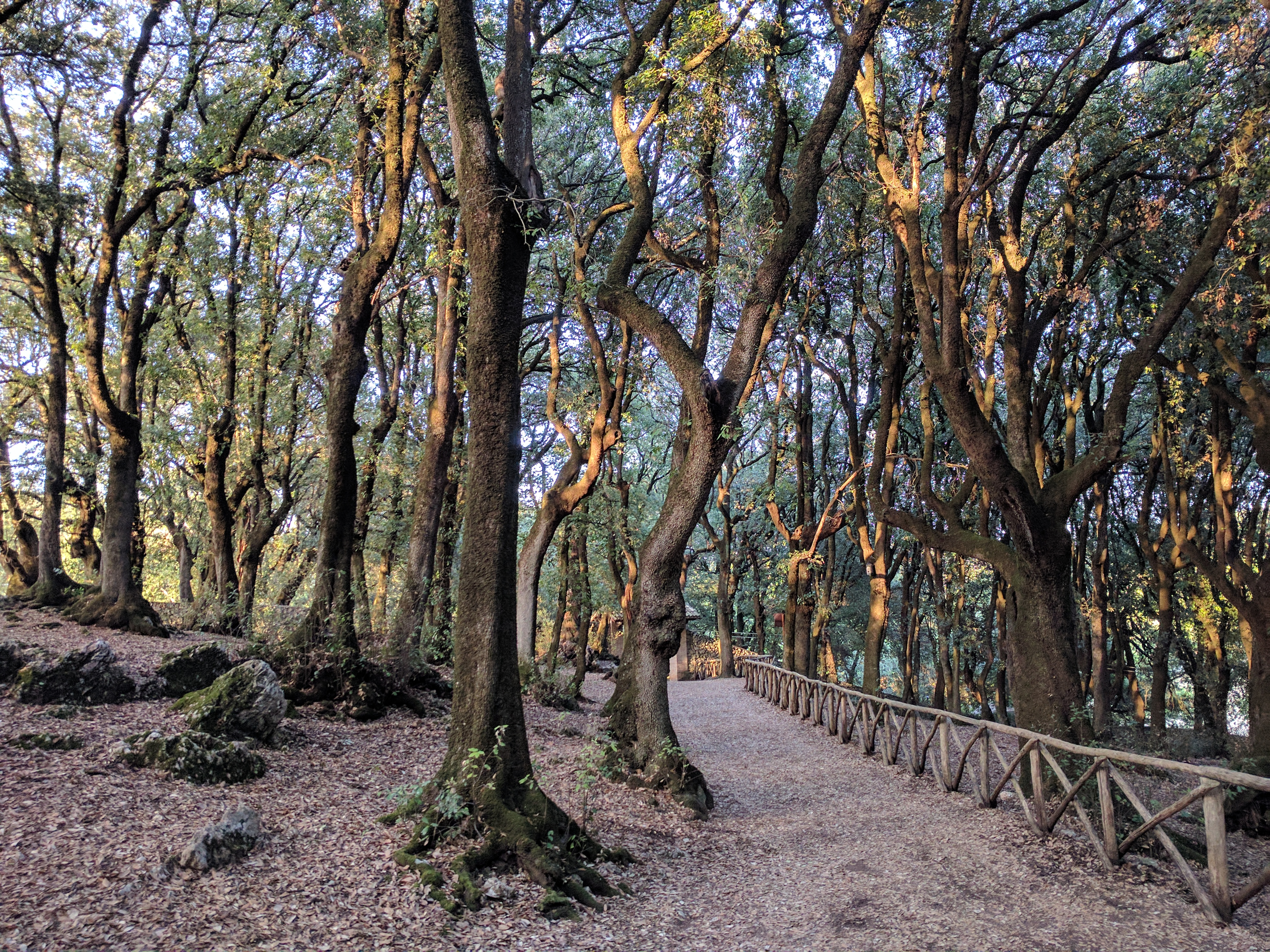
Sacred grove of Monte Luco

The name of Monteluco derives from its sacred grove (lucus). The dense vegetation of the sacred grove covers the hill, which rises to 800 metres (2,600 ft) above sea level and is linked to Spoleto by the Ponte delle Torri. The long-standing significance of the forest is reflected in its name and in the Lex Spoletina, a late 3rd-century BC set of stone inscriptions in archaic Latin establishing penalties for the profanation of the sacred wood dedicated to Jupiter.

The sacred grove is characterized by evergreen holm oak, unusual so far from the sea or large lakes, and provides habitat for large beetles, the green woodpecker, the great spotted woodpecker, the short-toed treecreeper, and the Eurasian nuthatch. Numerous hermitages and caves can be reached by the footpath running through the wood.

Along the ascent of Monteluco are the church of San Pietro, erected at the beginning of the 5th century on an ancient villa and a notable example of Umbrian Romanesque architecture, and the Romanesque church of San Giuliano, founded in the 12th century on the site of a 6th-century building dedicated to a martyr of the same name. Higher up stands the sanctuary of Monteluco together with a small church dedicated to Saint Catherine of Alexandria.

The sacred grove of Monteluco is designated as a Site of Community Importance.

=== Ponte Sanguinario ===
The Ponte Sanguinario is a Roman bridge located near porta San Gregorio. It once spanned the torrent Tessino. Excavated in 1843, it remained visible until 1848, when enclosing walls and vaults were constructed to allow access. The bridge is built of large travertine blocks and measures 8 metres (26 ft) in height, 24 metres (79 ft) in length, and about 4.50 metres (14.8 ft) in width.

=== Roman amphitheater ===
Near the bridge, to the east in the area later occupied by the Stella barracks, are the remains of the amphitheater, of curvilinear plan. Portions of the pillars and vaults of the upper walkways remain visible. Its axes measure 110 metres (360 ft) and 90 metres (300 ft). The Goths converted the amphitheater into a fortress in 545. It was later partially demolished by Cardinal Albornoz during the construction of the Rocca.

=== Roman house under piazza del Municipio ===
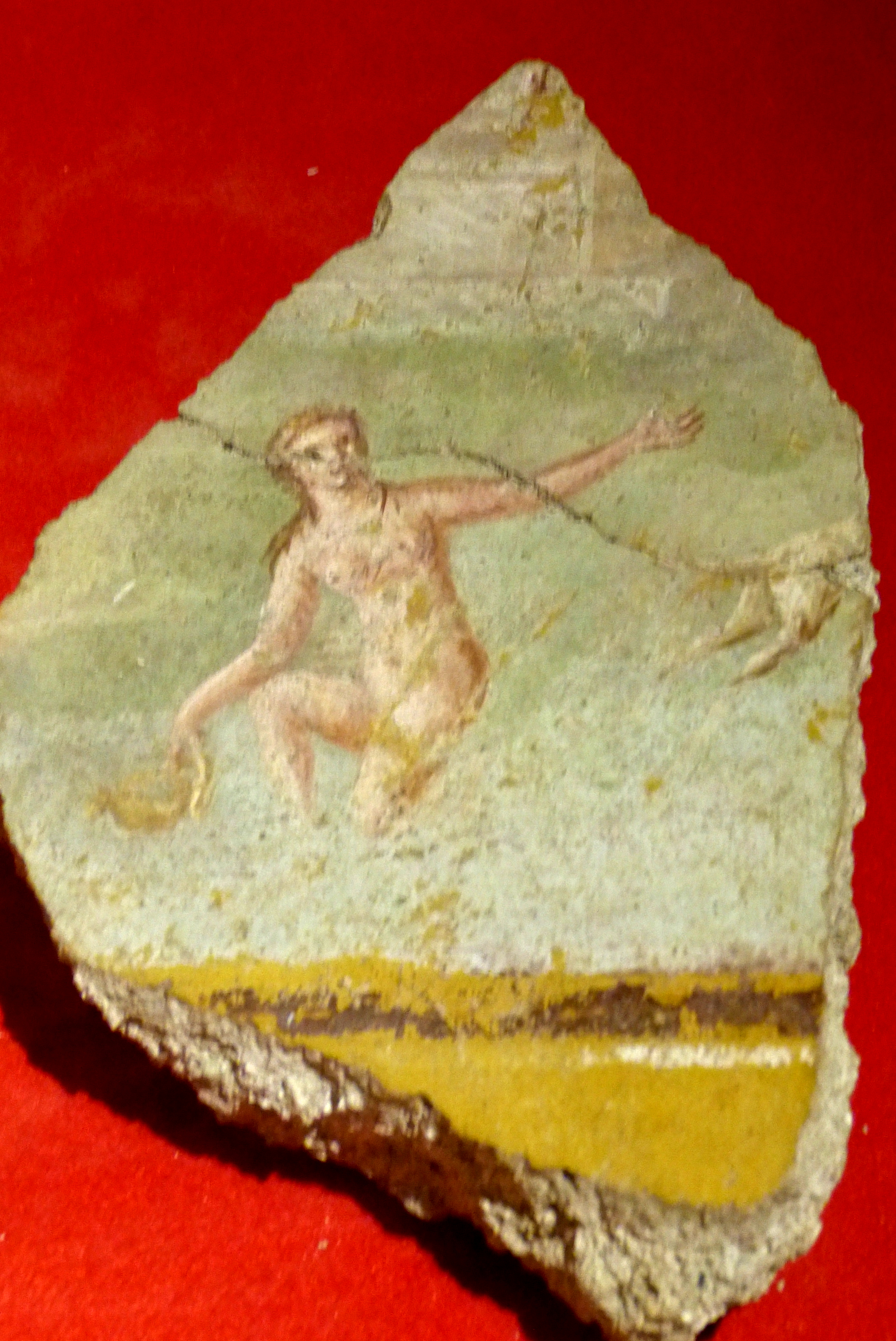
Fragment of a fresco from the Roman house

The Roman house of Spoleto is an example of an upper-class house of the early imperial period. Its frescoes, mosaics, and masonry place it in the 1st century AD. The first excavation campaign aimed at uncovering it was carried out by the archaeologist Giuseppe Sordini between 1885 and 1886, and work continued until his death in 1914.

Its location near the ancient Roman forum, now Piazza del Mercato, and the richness of its decorative elements suggest that its owner was a person of high status. During the excavations an inscription dedicated to the emperor Caligula and signed by a member of the Polla family was found, giving rise to the hypothesis that the house belonged to Vespasia Polla, mother of the emperor Vespasian, who was from the area between Norcia and Spoleto.

The rooms of the domus preserve mosaic floors and follow the architectural layout typical of patrician houses between the end of the Republican age and the beginning of the imperial period. At the center of the atrium is the impluvium, a square basin for collecting rainwater. Around the atrium are two bedrooms, two open rooms, and, at the far end, the tablinum, flanked by two smaller rooms. To the right of the tablinum is the triclinium, where remains of painted decoration are visible. Excavations also recovered numerous finds, including fragments of pottery, amphorae, lamps, spindle whorls, glass, bone and ivory objects such as combs, pins and needles, fragments of bronze statuettes, and metal elements.

The house shows evidence of destruction by fire, attributed to events in the time of Arcadius and Honorius, possibly connected with the incursions of Alaric in the early 5th century.

=== Porta Fuga ===
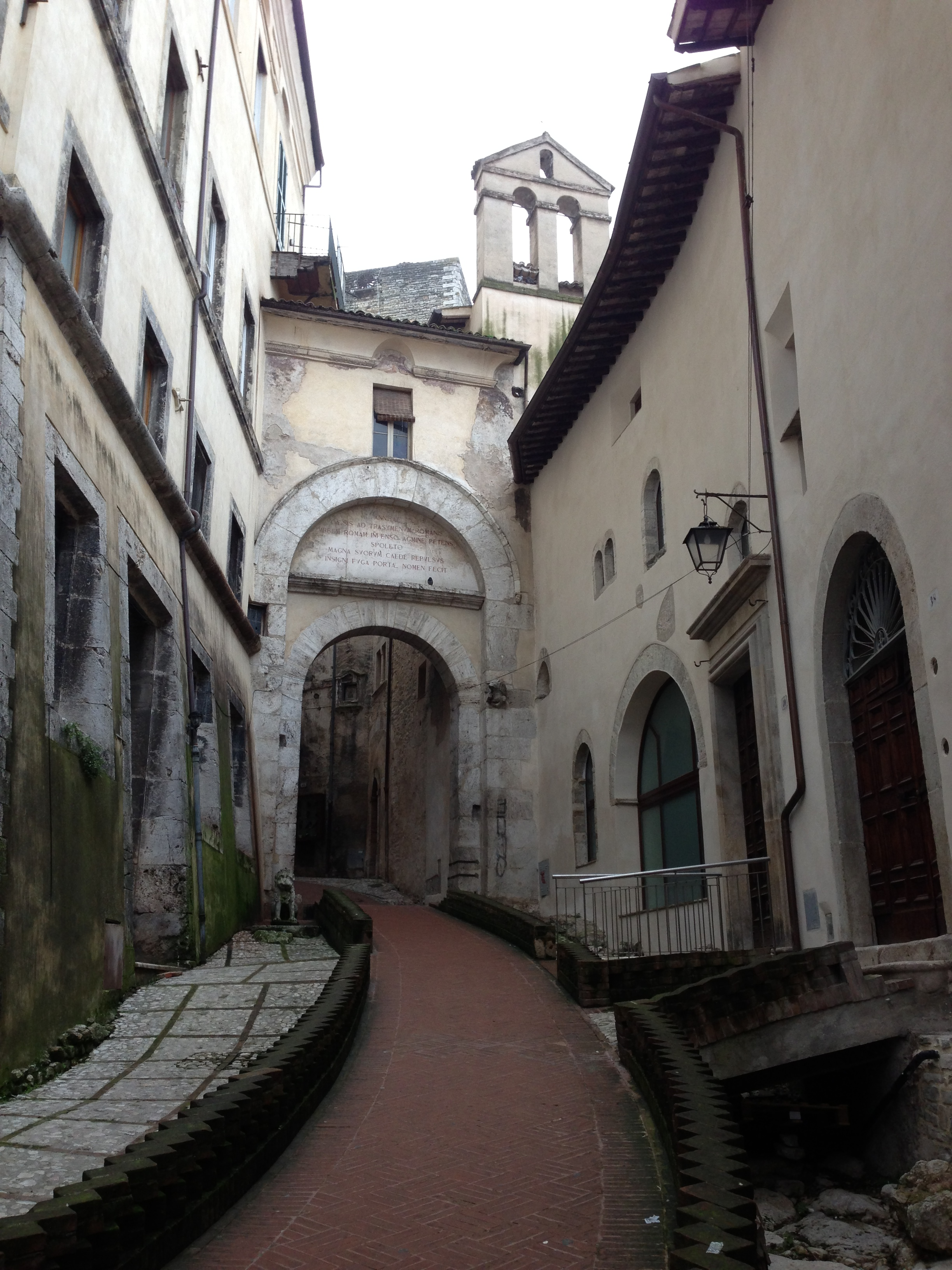
Porta Fuga

Porta Fuga, also known as the Gate of Hannibal, leads toward borgo San Gregorio. The name preserves a tradition connected with the repulse of the Carthaginians. The existing structure dates to a later period but occupies the site of an earlier gate, possibly incorporating fragments of the original.

=== Other secular buildings ===
Numerous private palaces are noted for their size and architecture, including the palaces of Campello, Sansi (formerly Leti), Mauri, Ancaiani, Pianciani, Zacchei-Travaglini, Collicola, Spada, Morelli De' Pazzi, Montevecchio of Ferentillo, Marignoli and Della Genga.

The Palazzo Montevecchio contains a large and notable collection of tapestries and an extensive 18th-century apartment preserved intact.

Other palaces include Palazzo della Signoria (14th century), housing the city's museum, and Palazzo Vigili (15th–16th centuries), which includes the Torre dell'Olio (13th century), the sole remaining medieval city tower in Spoleto.

During restoration work at Palazzo Mauri, a mosaic floor was discovered in 2004 in a good state of preservation. The composition shows two vine branches forming wide spirals, enclosing grape clusters and leaves. Between the branches are a deer and a bird. The mosaic is dated to the 6th-7th century and points to the presence of a significant religious building in the area.

Restoration of Palazzo Pianciani in 2005 led to the discovery of another mosaic floor. Its large, colored tesserae and imagery suggest a date in the 7th-8th century. The decoration includes a deer drinking from water flowing from a vessel and a peacock. These motifs are linked to Christian symbolism and suggest that the mosaic belonged to a church that no longer survives.

=== Other cultural heritage ===
The 1962 exhibition Sculture nella città displayed 104 sculptures by 54 major 20th-century sculptors in the streets and squares of Spoleto. Sculptures remaining in the city as a permanent reminder of the 1962 exhibition include Alexander Calder's Teodelapio, Beverly Pepper's Il dono di Icaro and Arnaldo Pomodoro's Colonna del Viaggiatore.

In the mid-19th century, cultural institutions in the city included a theatre, a musical academy, and the Accademia degli Ottusi founded in 1477.

== Events ==
The Festival dei Due Mondi (lit. 'Festival of the Two Worlds') was founded in 1958. Because Spoleto was a small town, where real estate and other goods and services were at the time relatively inexpensive, and also because there are two indoor theatres, a Roman theatre and many other spaces, it was chosen by Gian Carlo Menotti as the venue for an arts festival. It is also fairly close to Rome, with good rail connections. It is an important cultural event, held annually in late June-early July.

The festival has since developed into one of the most important cultural manifestations in Italy, with a three-week schedule of music, theater and dance performances. For some time it became a reference point for modern sculpture exhibits, particularly after the 5th Festival dei Due Mondi in 1962, which featured more than 100 sculptures placed in all corners of Spoleto curated by Giovanni Carandente. The 1962 exhibition, Sculpture in the City, brought together major 20th-century sculptors including Alexander Calder, Henry Moore, Lucio Fontana, David Smith, and Beverly Pepper. Works of art from this exhibition were left to the city, including Teodelapio by Alexander Calder, the artist's first monumental stabile which marked a turning point in his career.

In the United States, a parallel festival—Spoleto Festival USA—held in Charleston, South Carolina was founded in 1977 with Menotti's involvement. The twinning only lasted some 15 years and, after growing disputes between the Menotti family and the Spoleto Festival USA board, in the early 1990s a separation was consummated. However, following Menotti's death in February 2007, the city administrations of Spoleto and Charleston started talks to re-unite the two festivals which would climax in Spoleto mayor Massimo Brunini's attending the opening ceremony of Spoleto Festival USA in May 2008. For a short period of time, a third parallel festival was also held in Melbourne, Australia.

In 1992, the Spoleto Arts Symposium was initiated with the purpose of bringing talented people from all around the world to study in Spoleto. The program apparently ceased in 2009, to be replaced by a similar program, started by the College-Conservatory of Music (CCM) of the University of Cincinnati in 2010.

== Sport ==
Spoleto gained its main results in sport with the local volleyball team, Olio Venturi Spoleto, who classified in the quarter finals of the Italian championship in sport.

The town's football team, A.D. Voluntas Calcio Spoleto, play in Serie D.

ASD Spoleto Rugby, is the Rugby Union club of the town. They affiliated with FIR in 2014 and they play at Serie C2.

The Stadio Communale hosted an international Rugby League match, in 2018. The Italy national team (of the Lega Italiana Rugby Football League) played against the British-Asian Rugby League Association (BARA). BARA won the match.

== Notable people ==
Among the notable figures are Publius Cominius, praised by Cicero; Gaius Melissus, associated with Maecenas and noted as a distinguished grammarian; Matrinus, who gained Roman citizenship for his military valor; Lucius Carvilius, an orator mentioned by Livy; and Fabius Vigilius, a writer and poet known as the Varro of his time.

Later figures include Pier Francesco Giustolo, a renowned elegiac poet; Benedetto Egio, a scholar of Latin and Greek and professor in Paris; Evenzio Pico, author of grammatical works; Giuseppe Sillano Leoncilli, bishop of Orte and Latin poet; Filippo Leoncilli, historian; Severo Minervio, author of works on Spoleto; Bernardino Campello, historian; Parruccio Zampolino, chronicler; and Tommaso Martani, author of works on noble families.

Medical and legal scholars include Pier Leonio, Pietro Servio, Lodovico Pontano, Lodovico Ancaiani, Antonio Scelli, Antonio Leoncilli and Marco Aurelio De Domo. Religious and literary figures include Giovanni da Spoleto, Gregorio Elladio, Muzio de Angelis and Nevio Feliciano.

In the arts, Giovanni Spagna and Bernardino Campilli are prominent, while Domenico Martinelli wrote on clocks, and the Campana brothers were noted 17th-century mechanics.

== Twin towns – sister cities ==
- (United States) Charleston, South Carolina, US
- Schwetzingen, Germany
- Cajamarca, Peru
- Orange, France
- Cetinje, Montenegro

== See also ==
- Roman Catholic Archdiocese of Spoleto-Norcia
- Villa Pianciani
