= Eggi, Umbria =

Eggi is a village in the municipality of Spoleto, in the region of Umbria, Italy. As of 2021, it had a population of 417. The village is situated at an elevation of 325 metres (1,066 ft) above sea level.

It is located 5 kilometres (3.1 mi) from Spoleto in the direction of Foligno and 2 kilometres (1.2 mi) from the Via Flaminia, between the Valnerina and the Umbrian Valley.

== History ==
The village is of Roman origin and preserves distinct building phases. The castle, dating to the 14th century, has a triangular plan.

During the 15th century the settlement began to expand beyond the walls, and houses were built just outside them. Between the mid-16th century and the end of the 18th century Eggi experienced a period of prosperity, also linked to the presence of prominent inhabitants who commissioned artists to decorate the churches of the area.

== Religion and culture ==
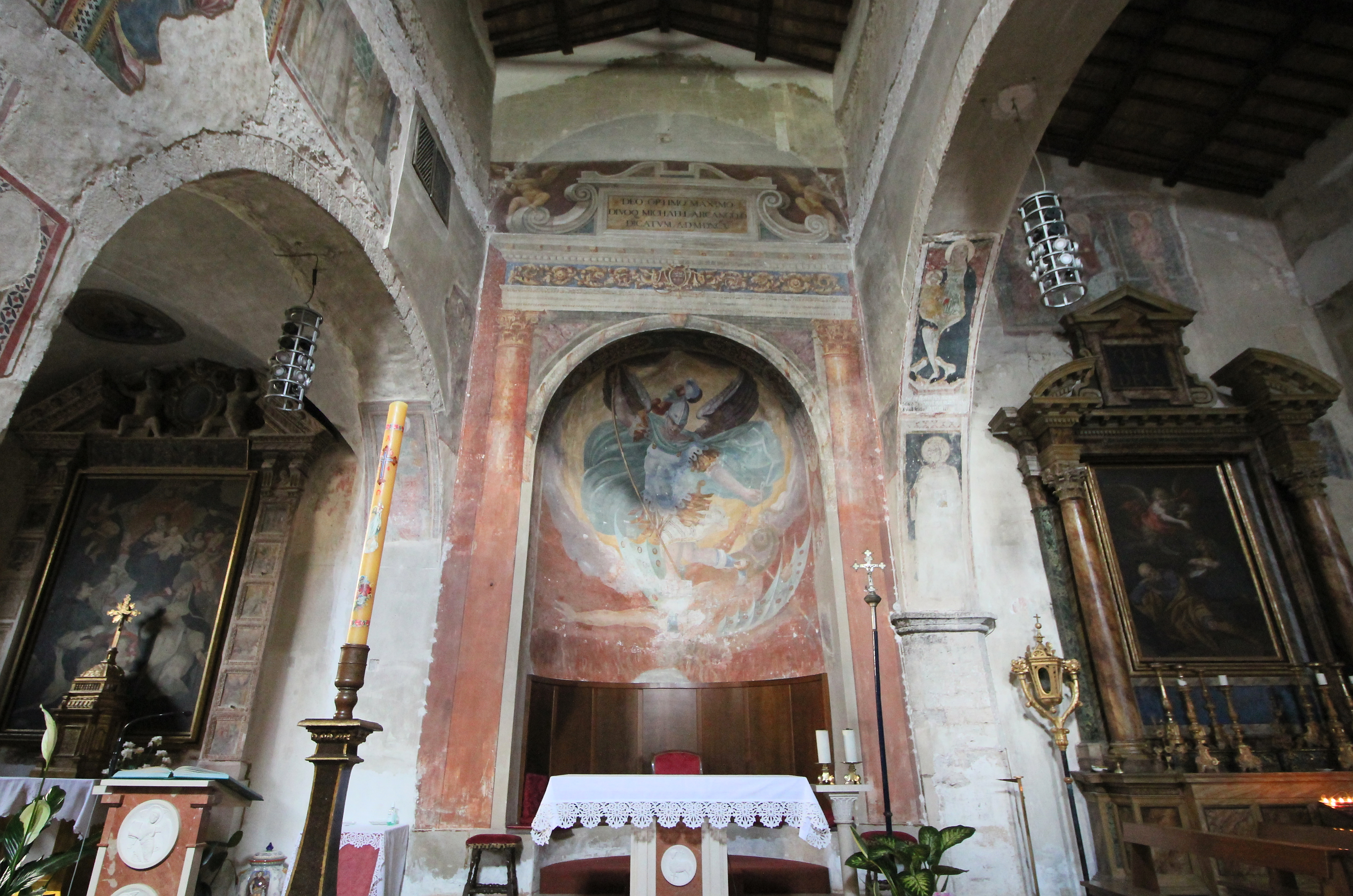
Interior of the church of San Michele Arcangelo at Eggi

The church of San Giovanni Battista in Eggi was frescoed between 1527 and 1532 by Lo Spagna. The paintings include the Baptism of Christ between Saints Sebastian and Roch in the semi-dome, the Madonna and Child between adoring Angels and Seraphim in the apse, and the Eternal Father blessing, Annunciation, and Saints Jerome and James on the triumphal arch.

The church of Santa Maria delle Grazie is a votive building of the late 15th century. It is decorated with frescoes in which the search for protection against the plague predominates.

The church of San Michele Arcangelo at Eggi contains frescoes by the Maestro di Eggi, an anonymous 15th-century painter identified by Federico Zeri through the frescoes in this church and active for a long time in the area of Spoleto and the Valnerina.

The Oratory of the Santissimo Sacramento and the hospital complex include a gate marking the area of isolation, a large ward, a kitchen, and other service rooms. On the ground floor was the storehouse of the Monte Frumentario.

== Events ==
Eggi is known for the Festa degli asparagi di bosco, held between late April and early May, during which a traditional local dish is served: homemade strangozzi with asparagus sauce.
