= Piazza del Popolo, Todi =

Square in Todi, Italy

Coordinates: 42.78230°N 12.40650°E

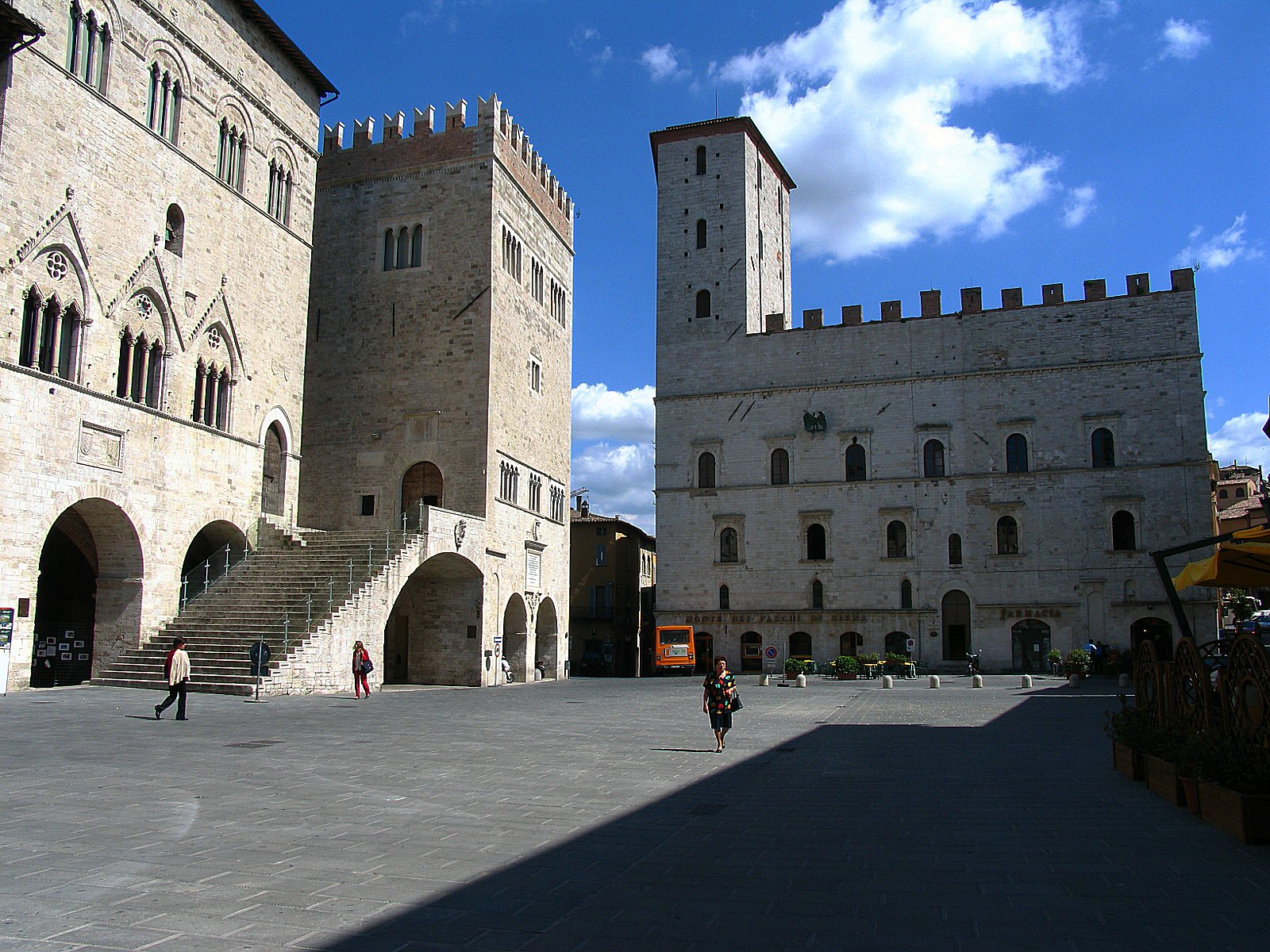
Piazza del Popolo

Piazza del Popolo is a city square in Todi, Italy.

== Buildings around the square ==
- Concattedrale della Santissima Annunziata
- Palazzo del Capitano
- Palazzo dei Priori (Todi)
- Palazzo del Popolo
