= Santa Maria in Camuccia, Todi =

Church building in Todi, Italy

Coordinates: 42.777778°N 12.401944°E

Santa Maria in Camuccia is a Romanesque and Gothic-style, Roman Catholic church on Via Santa Maria in Camuccia number 54, in the center of Todi, province of Perugia, region of Umbria, Italy.

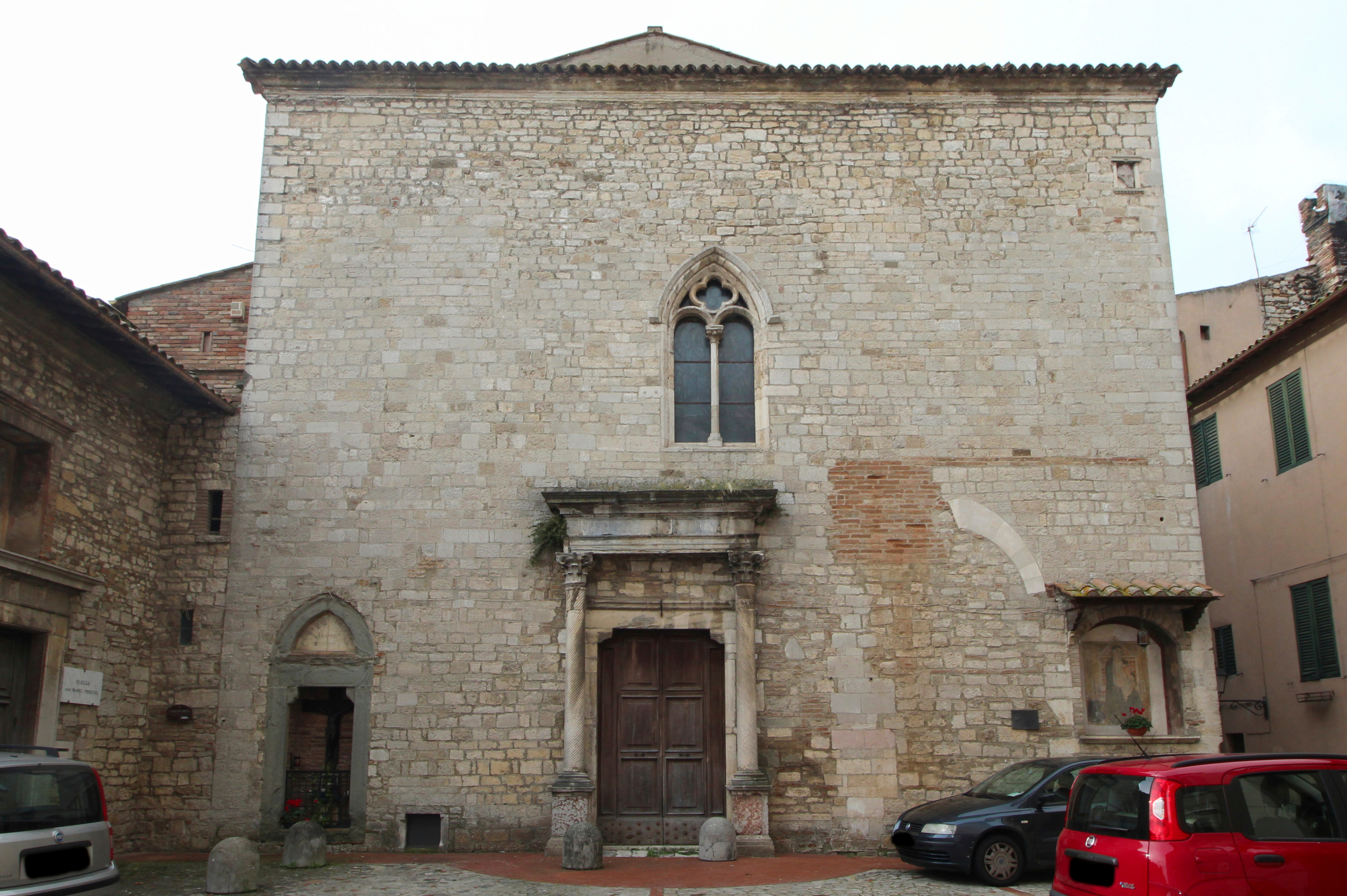
The facade of the church Santa Maria in Camuccia in Todi

== History ==
The church is ancient, said to have been originally erected in the 7th or 8th centuries, but the present layout mainly reflects the reconstruction during the 13th century. A Dominican convent was present at its side from 1394 until suppression in 1810 under the Napoleonic government.

The small portal of the church is flanked by columns with Corinthian capitals, while the interior has a single nave with nearly 10 lateral chapels. In the third chapel on the left there is a 12th-century wooden sculpture called the Sedes Sapientiae, depicting an Enthroned Madonna and Child.
