= Piazza del Popolo (disambiguation) =

Piazza del Popolo may refer to:

- Piazza del Popolo, Ascoli Piceno
- Piazza del Popolo, Cesena
- Piazza del Popolo, Como
- Piazza del Popolo, Fermo
- Piazza del Popolo, Rome
- Piazza del Popolo, Todi
