= Palazzo dei Priori (disambiguation) =

Palazzo dei Priori is a public palace in Perugia, Umbria, Italy.

Palazzo dei Priori may also refer to:

- Palazzo dei Priori, Fermo, a medieval-Renaissance palace in Fermo, Marche, Italy
- Palazzo dei Priori, Viterbo, a civic palace in Viterbo, Lazio, Italy
- Palazzo dei Priori, Volterra, a Gothic-style civic building in Volterra, Tuscany, Italy
- Palazzo dei Priori (Todi), a palace in Todi, Italy
