= Izzalini =

Frazione of Todi, Umbria, Italy

- Frazione
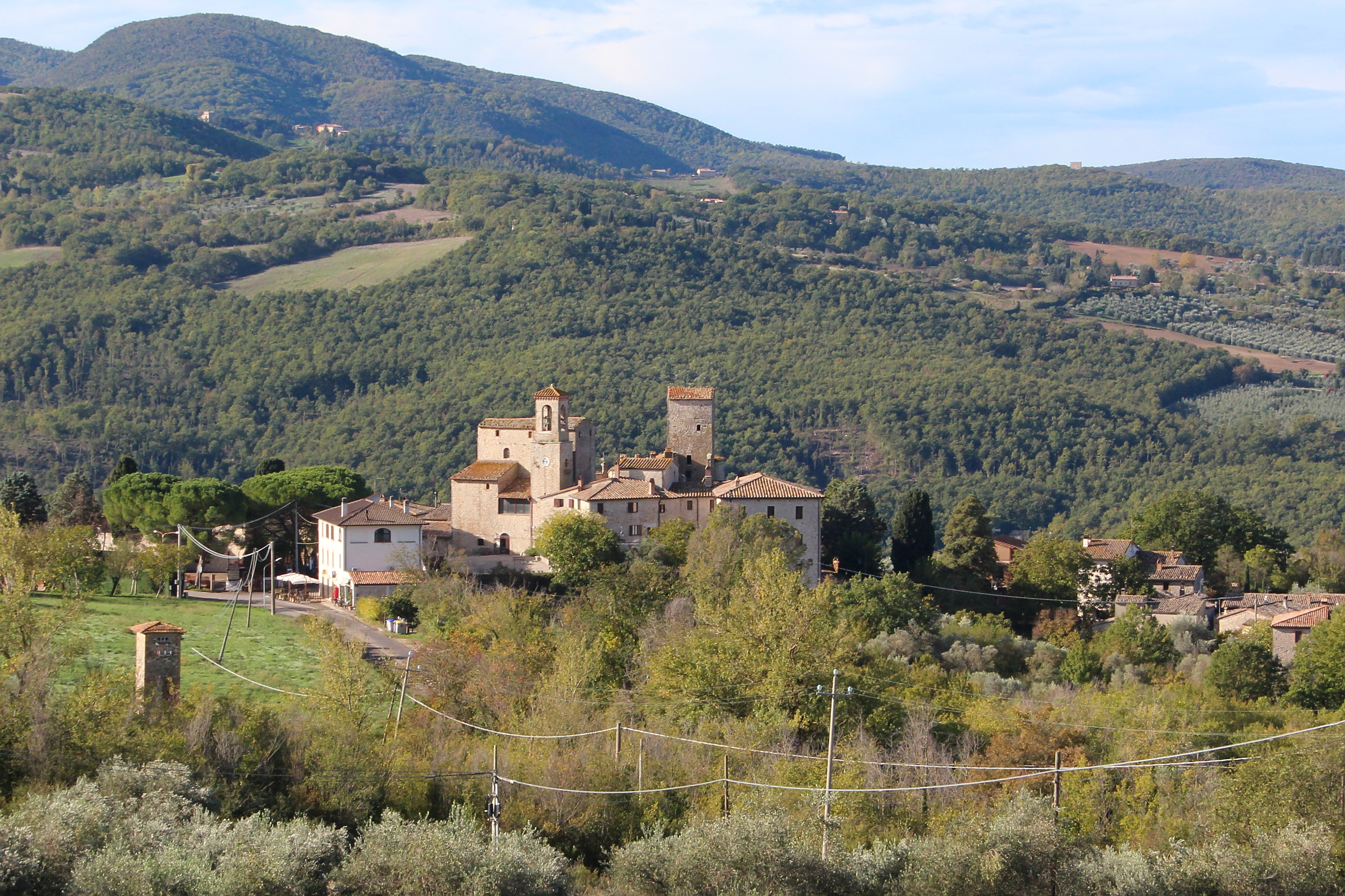
- Façade of the castle and its bell tower

- Location within Umbria Location within Italy
- Coordinates: 42°44′12″N 12°22′10″E
- Country: Italy
- Region: Umbria
- Province: Perugia
- Comune: Todi

Area
  - Total: 5.6 km^{2} (2.2 sq mi)
- Elevation: 417 m (1,368 ft)

Population (1 October 2020)
  - Total: 54
  - Density: 9.6/km^{2} (25/sq mi)
- Time zone: UTC+1 (CET)
  - Summer (DST): UTC+2 (CEST)

Izzalini is a frazione of the comune of Todi, in the Province of Perugia, Umbria, central Italy.

The village lies along the hilly road from Todi to Montecchio, at an elevation of 417 m (1,368 ft) above sea level. It has 54 inhabitants.

== History ==
The area was the site of Roman settlements, as evidenced by the discovery of lead pipes, terracotta jugs and coins of Etruscan origin.

The settlement was originally known as Sant'Angelo de Plebe, after its church, which was also a parish church and had jurisdiction over Collelungo. The village had a population of about 160 when, according to tradition, troops of Ezzelino III da Romano (1194–1259) seized it. After expelling the Guelphs, they fortified the settlement, transforming it into a well-defended castle, which was given the new name Izzalini.

Izzalini increased its importance with the construction in 1458 of a fortress known as Torre Baldo, to which a church dedicated to Saint Stephen was also attached. In the woods of Torre Baldo, ruins attest to the existence of a 13th-century castle said to have been built by Ilione Landone. It was therefore known as Castrum Ilionis, and later as Castiglione de Franconibus. The former settlements of San Giovanni l'Ammetato and Petacciòlo gave their names to two localities in the area.

The remains of the castrum include a well-preserved tower, sections of masonry, earthworks, underground structures, and defensive bastions. Nearby, the remains of a fortified village, a parish church, and a cemetery are less well preserved. The area was completely abandoned in the 14th century for uncertain reasons, probably related to an economic and social crisis that coincided with the spread of the plague. The area around the castrum was the scene of clashes between the Lombards and the Byzantines. One of the main indications of this is provided by local toponymy, which includes place names of both Germanic and Latin origin. This has been interpreted as evidence that the territory was disputed between the Lombards and Byzantines. Castiglione was the seat of the Landi family, while the associated villa was inhabited by people subject to the local lord. The Landi also owned the nearby Villa de Franconibus, which was likewise inhabited by their dependants.

The castle of Piemozzo is comparatively well preserved. Until the 16th century it contained the Church of Sant'Andrea, which was later replaced by an oratory known as Santa Chiara.

== Landmarks ==
- Izzalini Castle, with a round-arched entrance surmounted by the bell tower of the former church;
- the Castrum Ilionis or Castiglione de Franconibus, remains of a 13th-century castle;
- the Torre Baldo fortress and the remains of Ilione Landone Castle;
- Piemozzo Castle.
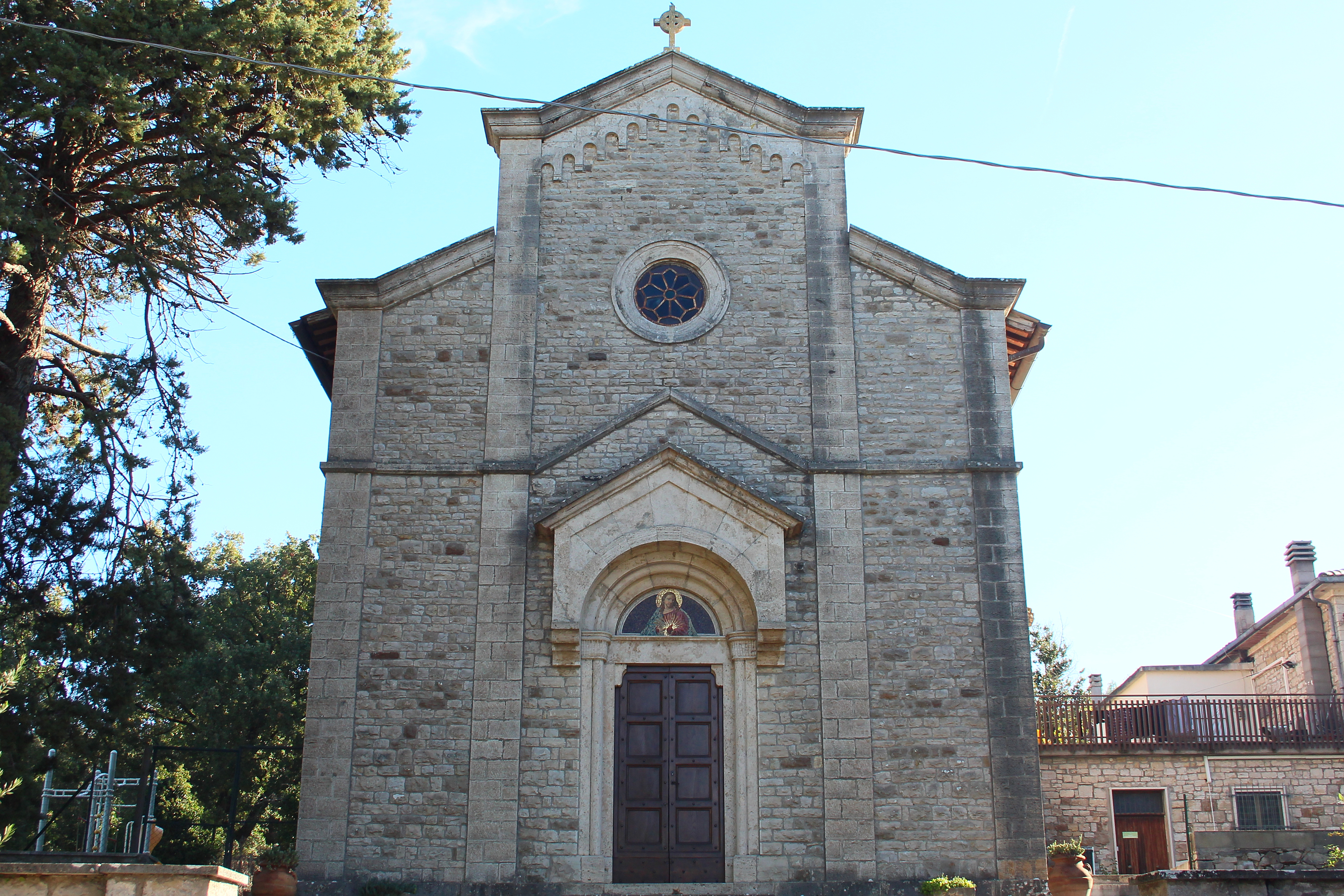
Church of San Michele Arcangelo

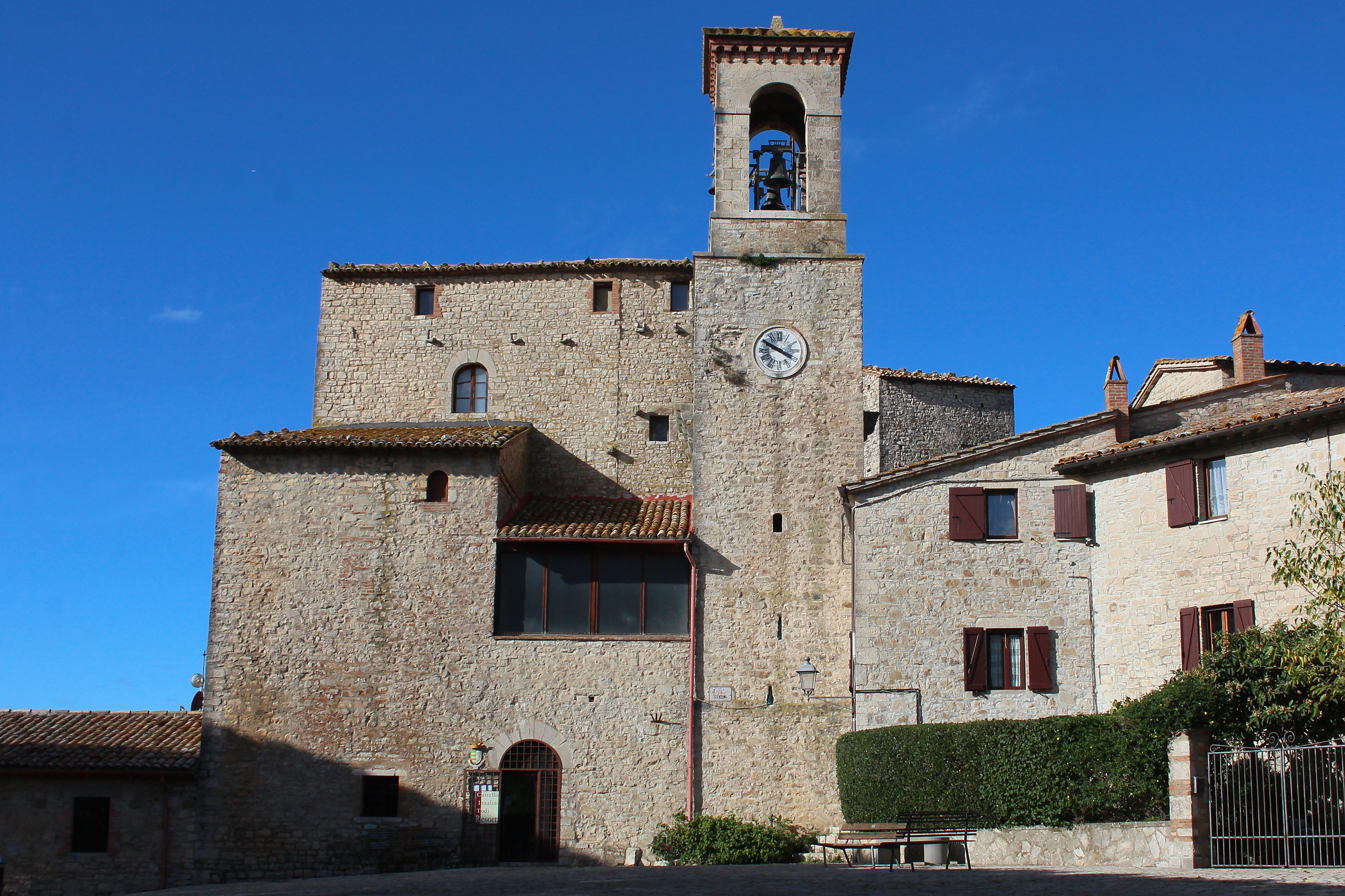
Izzalini Castle

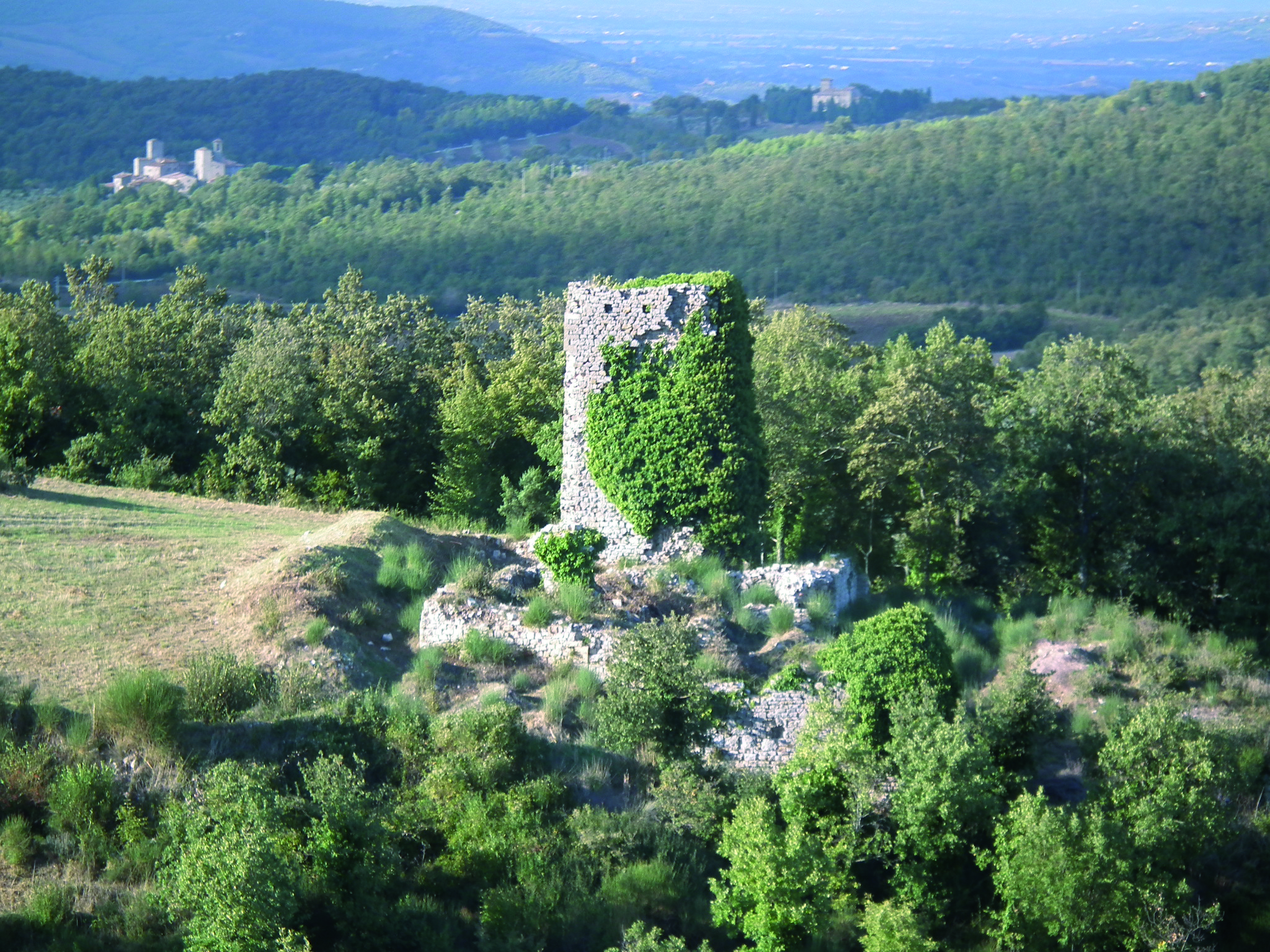
The Castrum Ilionis

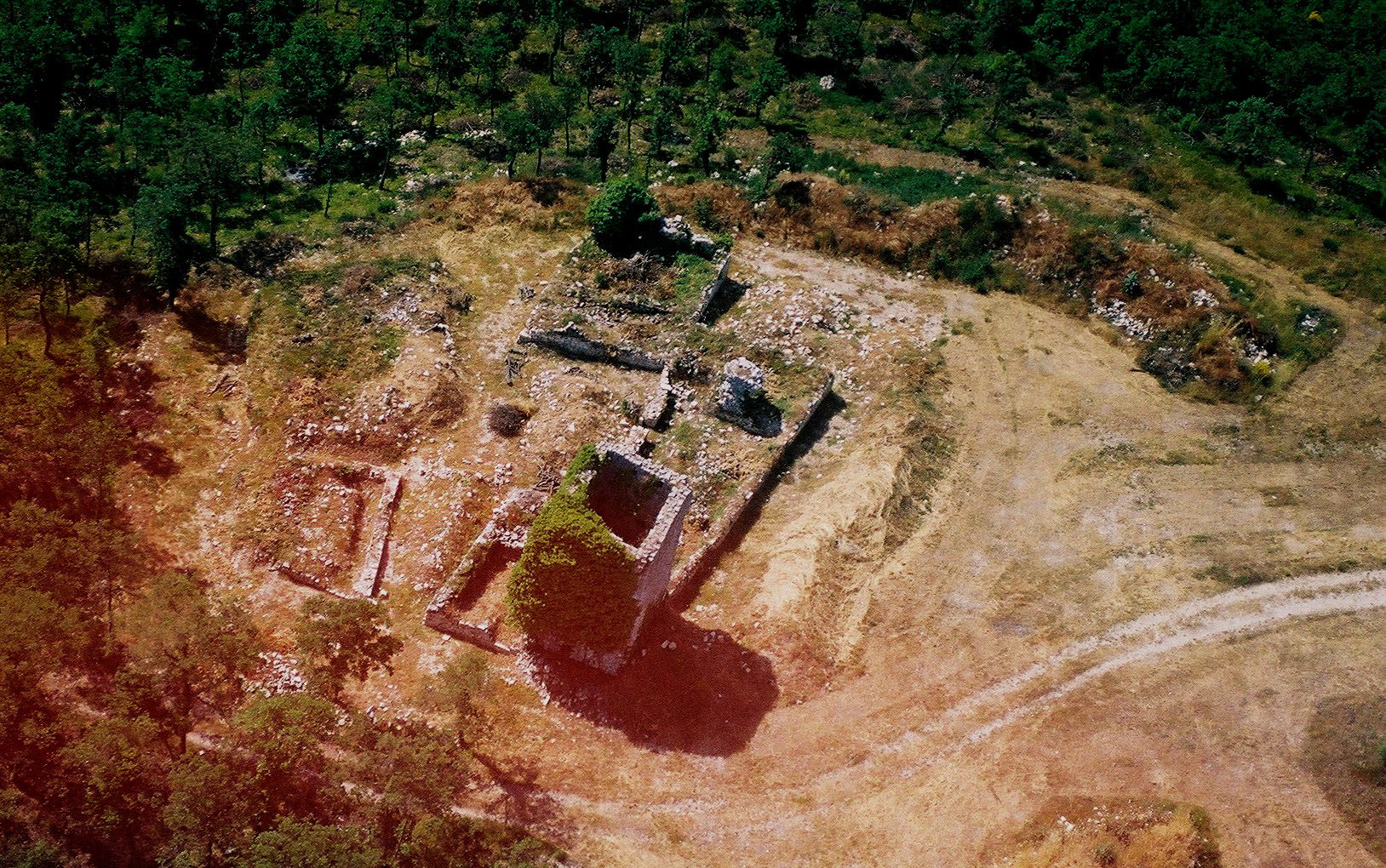
Aerial view of the Castrum Ilionis

== Economy ==
The large number of farmhouses and rural buildings in the surrounding area has contributed to the development of agritourism.
