= List of noble families in Umbria =

The list of noble families in Umbria comprises aristocratic lineages documented from the post-Roman period within the boundaries of the modern Italian region of Umbria. It includes families that originated in the area as well as those that, at various times, held lordship, jurisdiction, or significant property in its towns and castles.

== A ==
Alviano di Orvieto — A family originating from Todi, which took its name from the castle of Alviano, of which it was feudatory. It also held the fiefs of Riofreddo and Mandola. An Ugolino served as podestà and captain of the people in his native city, and several others of the lineage held similar offices in various Italian communes. A Pandolfo is recorded as bishop of Camerino, and a Luigi as lord of Persiano. The most notable member of the family was Bartolomeo, a condottiero, who died in 1515. The Alviano line became extinct in Livio Attilio, killed in battle in 1537. A branch was established in Agrigento in the time of Peter II of Aragon.

Astancolli di Todi — A family originally from Padua, which settled in Todi in the 12th century. It held lordship over the castle of Monticello.

Atti di Todi — A family of Lombard origin. The lineage is credited with numerous ecclesiastical figures, including nine Blesseds, twelve bishops, and four cardinals. It later divided into several branches; from the Sassoferrato line is recorded Carlo, bishop in 1405.

== B ==
Baglioni di Perugia — A family traditionally held to derive from the Dukes of Swabia, with its Italian progenitor identified as Ludovico, imperial vicar of Frederick Barbarossa, in 1184. In 1260, Baglione Socco established permanent residence in Perugia. After the expulsion of the Oddi, the Baglioni exercised lordship over the city for a period, and produced several notable figures. Members of the family held high civic and ecclesiastical offices, including the podesteria of Florence, and episcopal sees at Perugia, Orvieto, and Macerata. A branch flourished in Venice and was admitted to its patriciate in 1746. Other branches were established in Florence, Verona, and Mirandola.

Baschi di Orvieto — A family recorded in Orvieto from 1322, with comital title. It was also enrolled among the patriciates of Siena and Lodi. Bernardino was commendatore of San Giustino, and Francesco, son of Ranuccio, was a Knight of the Order of Saint Stephen in 1613. Ugolino defended the fatherland at the abbey of San Romedio against the troops of the Bavarians in 1327. Raniero, captain of the Pisans, distinguished himself in the battle of Gello and in the Paduan–Venetian border war.

Bourbon del Monte Santa Maria dell'Umbria — Descended from Ariberto, who accompanied Charlemagne into Italy in 804 and, in reward for his services, was made Marquess of Tuscany and imperial vicar in Arezzo and Città di Castello. Ariberto was Baron of Bourbon and ancestor of Ranieri, who took the name Bourbon del Monte. The family divided into numerous branches, including the Bourbon del Monte, Marquesses of Petrella, Civitella, and Petriolo; those of Vigliano and Monte Santa Maria; those of Sorbello in Perugia; of Santa Maria in Florence and in Ancona; and the Bourbon del Monte of Città di Castello. Across these lines, members held prominent offices, including podestà, captains, priors, gonfaloniers, Knights of the Order of Saint Stephen, and governors. Elemberto was bishop of Arezzo; Ugolino served as imperial vicar in Siena under Emperor Charles IV; and Cristoforo was bishop of Cortona. The family also held lordship over numerous fiefs and several marquisates.

== C ==
Campello di Spoleto — A family traced to Campeaux in France, where it held sovereign lordship. A member of the lineage, Rovero, is recorded as having come to Italy with Guy, Duke of Spoleto, and to have founded a castle on the Clitunno, which he named Campello. He received investiture of the site with the comital title from the duke, later confirmed by the emperor Lambert. By around 1300, the Counts of Campello had divided into several branches. Members of the family held civic office in Rome, including the senatorial rank. Francesca and Girolamo were venerated as Blesseds. Among ecclesiastical figures attributed to the lineage are William, Bishop of Chalon in Champagne, and Nicolò, Bishop of Mauretania. Lanfranco acquired the castle of Spina. Paolo, son of Bernardino, served as Grand Conservator and Grand Prior of the Order of Saint Stephen.

== D ==
Della Penna di Perugia — A family of German origin, formerly known as Arcipreti, which took its later name from the castle of Penna built in the outskirts of Amelia. Members include Francesco, senator of Rome in 1364; Alessio, created cardinal in 1189 by Pope Clement III; Agamennone and Giacomo, captains in the 14th century, the former serving in 1414 as lieutenant general under Braccio da Montone and the latter holding the same rank under Niccolò Piccinino; and Diomede, general of the forces of the state of Avignon, who in 1573 obtained from the Holy See the elevation of his fief to a duchy. Through the marriage of Ercole della Penna with Laura dalla Corgna, their sons inherited the marquisate of Castiglione del Lago.

== E ==
Eroli di Narni — A family of Narni, attested from 1400. The family remained based in Narni and later gave rise to two branches, one established in Orvieto and the other in Rome; the Orvieto branch is extinct. Members of the family held several public offices, including podestà in Umbrian cities, treasurer of the Marche, and lieutenant general of the same province. The family also produced four bishops, among them Berardo, created cardinal of the Roman Church in 1460.

In the 16th century, the Eroli held one third of the barony of Marinata and Comarcana, castles in the territory of Narni. Pier Giacomo was admitted to the Roman nobility in 1649; in 1734, the same status was confirmed for his sons and descendants, who were also members of the patriciate of Narni and Todi.

== M ==
Marsciano di Orvieto e di Roma — A family of Lombard origin, which held the ancient duchy of Chiusi and extensive dominions in Tuscany, Romagna, and Umbria from the 8th century; this power was still maintained in 980 in the time of Count Kadolo, from whom descended all the lords of Marsciano, later divided into several branches. The descendants of Kadolo, divided into three principal lines known as those of Parrano, Migliano, and Marsciano, from their chief fiefs, were subsequently designated collectively as Counts of Marsciano. By a broad privilege granted by Louis IV the Bavarian in 1338, their jurisdiction was confirmed with additional prerogatives; it records that the Counts of Marsciano then possessed more than fifty fiefs and were among the most powerful barons of central Italy. These fiefs were largely still retained in 1513, when Leo X confirmed their sovereignty by a further privilege. The principal seat of the family was Orvieto, where its members held leading offices, while the jurisdiction over Marsciano had been sold to the commune of Perugia in 1282.

Among notable figures of the family are the Blessed Angeline of Marsciano, active in the 14th century and founder of the sisters of the Third Order of Saint Francis; the Blessed Isabella; and the Venerable Sister Francesca. Count Antonio, in the mid-15th century, was a distinguished general of the Florentines and Venetians; his son Ranuccio served as general of the forces of Frederick of Naples, by whom he was created Duke of Gravina together with his descendants. Marco Antonio, general of the papal forces, was created Marquis of the Gorga by Innocent X.

== O ==
Oddi di Perugia — A family said to have originated in Hungary and to have come to Italy with Emperor Frederick II. It settled in Perugia, where it long contested supreme authority with the ruling family, at times prevailing as the dominant power in the city. With the year 1468, factional hostilities ended and the rival families were reconciled.

The family provided three podestà to Parma: Oddo in 1280, Ungaro in 1291, and Marolo in 1293, as well as others to major Italian cities. Many members pursued military careers. Among them were Oddone, captain general of the Perugians; Rodolfo, a noted commander who served under the Aragonese with the rank of constable; another Rodolfo, who commanded the Perugian cavalry against Città di Castello; Giacomo, general of the Florentine cavalry against the Visconti; Bartolomeo Miccia, commander of the forces of the Florentine Republic; another Oddone, who led the city militia at Cortona; and another Bartolomeo, who served with high rank in the Venetian forces against the Turks, and later as colonel and brigadier in the army of Pope Clement XI, and as military governor in the duchy of Ferrara.

In the church hierarchy were Oliverio, created cardinal by Pope Innocent II; Alessandro, general of the Camaldolese order; Marco Antonio, bishop of Perugia in 1659; Giacomo, archbishop of Laodicea and papal envoy to various courts; and Fabrizio, apostolic protonotary, abbot of the parish church, and commander of Rhodes in the Order of Saint John, in which Ercole (1572) and Grifone (1707) also served. Galeotto di Sforza Oddi, in 1594, obtained the bailiwick of Narni in the Order of Saint Stephen, founded by his father.

== P ==
Pianciani di Spoleto — Took its name from the castle of Pianciano in the district of Spoleto, over which it held lordship from time immemorial. From as early as the 13th century there is record of Simone di Pianciano, a leading magistrate in Spoleto. Tommaso served as senator of Rome in 1360. Giambattista was likewise senator of Rome, after having been first podestà of Florence in 1422, and Count Ugolino was senator of Rome in 1425. The Pianciani also flourished in Siena, where they were enrolled among the ancient patriciate. The branch of Spoleto obtained the same distinction in Rome by decree of the Senate of 30 December 1842.

== S ==
Spada di Terni e Roma — A family whose founder was Giovanni Spada, living in 1309 in Terni, where he was head of the Guelph faction and took part, together with his sons Cola and Matteuccio, in making a peace treaty with the Ghibelline party. Many members of this house were sent by their homeland as envoys to the Popes.

Fustinello, son of Paolo, was treasurer of the Commune towards the end of the 14th century. Corrado, son of Uriguccio, followed a military career and in 1453 was given the post of castellan of Colleluce. Gian Girolamo, son of Bernardino, was Conservator of Rome in 1717, private chamberlain to Pope Innocent XIII in 1722, and in 1724 resident minister to the Holy See for Leopold, Duke of Lorraine.

Silvestro, his brother, a captain in the service of the same duke, took part in the campaign of Temeswar and in that fought on the Rhine in 1688, and when, during the War of the Spanish Succession, Joseph I, besieged the fortress of Landau, Silvestro was sent by his lord the Duke as special envoy to the imperial camp and then to the court of Louis XIV of France, and to that of the Duke of Orléans, regent during the minority of Louis XV; he was then appointed chamberlain and equerry to the Duke of Lorraine and finally granted the land of Gerbéviller, raised to a marquisate.

Alerame, son of Alessandro, having gone to serve in Austria, took part in all the wars fought against Frederick the Great against the Turks, and was made deputy governor of the State of Milan in 1743 and later major general. This family was granted in 1553 the land of Collescipoli, raised by Pope Julius III to a county in favor of Giovan Girolamo and Michelangelo, sons of Vittorio, the latter of whom was enrolled among the Roman nobility in 1574. Pope Clement X in 1671 granted Bernardino Cesare Spada and all his descendants the title of count, and in 1707 gave him in perpetuity the title of Count of Collalbero in the Perugian territory.

== T ==
Tarlati di Arezzo — A prominent Ghibelline family whose leading figure in the early 14th century was Guido, Bishop of Arezzo. He seized lordship of his native city and soon extended his power over Città di Castello. In 1327, his brother Pier Saccone succeeded him as ruler of both Arezzo and Città di Castello. Also lord of a small Apennine state centered on the castle of Pietramala, Pier Saccone brought under his control many mountain regions of Tuscany, Romagna, and the Marches. However, during a war against the Florentines, he lost Arezzo in 1337. He died in 1357 at the age of 96, and with him the fortunes of his family rapidly declined.

== V ==
Valenti di Trevi — A family of Trevi, holding the comital title. Monsignor Monte Valenti served as governor of Romagna in 1567.

Vitelli di Città di Castello — A family of Città di Castello. A record of the city priors dated 1356 states that Domenico Vitelli and two other members of the family were merchants, natives of the city, where they and their ancestors had long held the highest public offices and honors. Gerozzo Vitelli was grain officer of the commune in 1384 and died in 1398 after serving several times as a member of the council of Eight of the Guard.

His descendants were prominent and experienced military leaders and held supreme power in the city for a considerable period. Many served in arms for the Papal States, the Republic of Venice, the Duchy of Tuscany, and various princes, and most died violently.

Paolo, who commanded the Florentine army in 1498 in the campaign against Pisa, was executed in Florence. His brother Vitellozzo was strangled in the fortress of Senigallia by order of Cesare Borgia. Chiappino, son of Paolo, died in 1511 at the siege of Mirandola. Nicolò, his brother, was killed in a stable by Nicolò Bracciolini. Another Chiappino, son of the latter, while commanding the armies of Philip II of Spain in 1575, was thrown from a trench by his own soldiers. Giovanni, his brother, died in battle while serving in the French army in support of Siena in 1554.

The family produced two senior churchmen: Giulio, elected bishop of Città di Castello in 1499, and Francesco, appointed in 1632 as archbishop of Thessalonica and administrator of the diocese of Ripatransone, and in 1639 transferred to the archbishopric of Urbino. Military service brought the family wealth and status. It held a number of fiefs, including the marquisates of Cetona, Riva, Carmiano, Ponte d'Albarola, and Spettino in the Piacenza area, as well as Montefiore, Civita Sant'Angelo, the duchy of Gravina, and the county of Montone. The line became extinct.
