= Palazzo del Popolo, Todi =

Medieval civic palace in Todi, Italy

Coordinates: 42.78204°N 12.40693°E

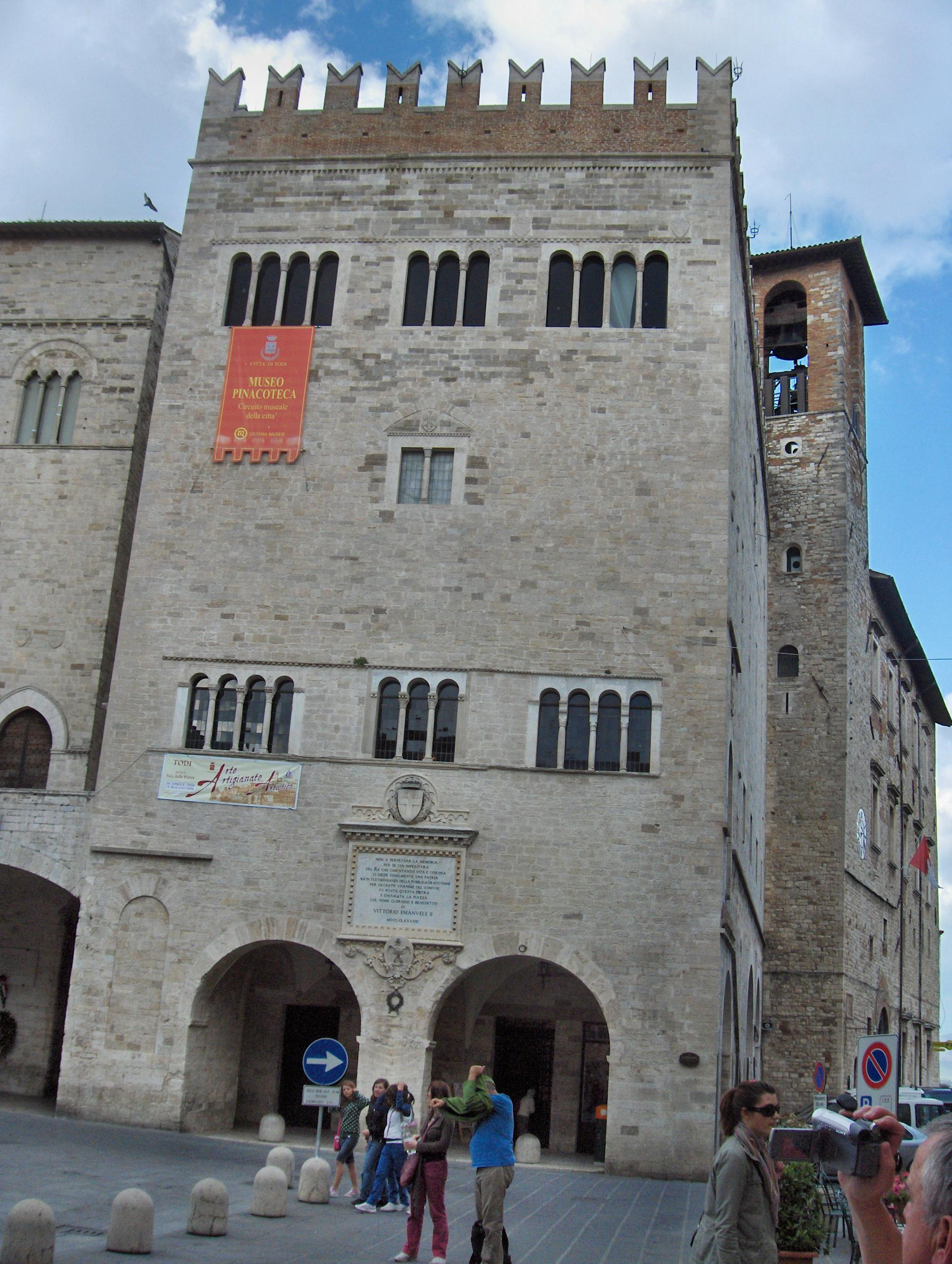
Palazzo del Popolo

Palazzo del Popolo, also called Palazzo del Priori or Podesta, is a Gothic architecture civic palace in Todi, region of Umbria, Italy.

The palace was erected in 1213-1228, thus decades before the adjacent Palazzo del Capitano. The wide staircase that serves as a bridge into the main council room was added in 1267 by the Podestà Pandolfo Savelli. The orientation of the main facade was established in the 16th century. The palazzo was extensively refurbished in the 19th century, which added the merlons to the rooflines of two buildings in this piazza.

== Museo Civico Pinacoteca ==
The top floors of the Palazzo del Capitano and the Palazzo del Popolo house the Pinacoteca Civic Museum of Todi. Among the items in the collections of the museum are an 11th-century bas relief in marble depicting Saints Fortunato, Cassiano and Christ; a 16th-century wood model of the church of Santa Maria della Consolazione by Ventura Vitoni; an altarpiece depicting the Coronation of the Virgin by Giovanni di Spagna, a Deposition (1608) by Pietro Paolo Sensini; six canvases from the Duomo and San Fortunato by Ferraù da Faenza; a Madonna and Child with Saints and a Christ before Saints Jerome, Clare of Assisi, Antony of Padua, (Santa) Romana, and the blessed Jacopone (circa 1644) by Andrea Polinori.

The Hall of the Council of the Priori is decorated with portraits of famous citizens of Todi including Jacopone (18th century) and views of the town and events in the history of Todi, such as the Legend of the foundation of Todi and the Entry of Trajan into Todi, painted by Ignazio Mei (1719–1721). The museum has sections with archeologic findings, ceramics, and extensive numismatic holdings.
