= Lo Spagna =

Italian painter (died 1529)

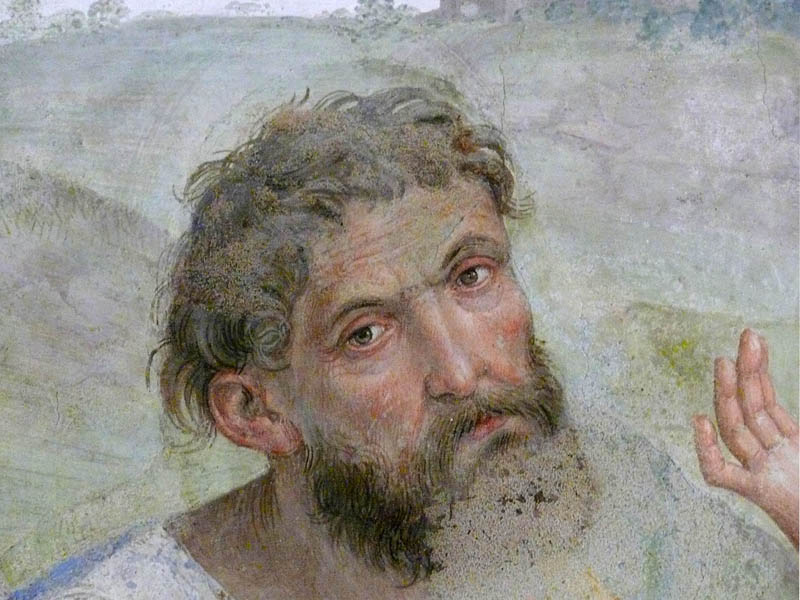
Fresco "Transporto di Cristo al sepolcro", Trevi, Chiesa della Madonna delle Lacrime, Cappella di S. Francesco – detail

Lo Spagna (died c. 1529), "the Spaniard" in Italian, was a painter of the Renaissance, active in central Italy. His name was Giovanni di Pietro, but he was known as Lo Spagna because he was of Spanish heritage. He was an important assistant and follower of the Umbrian painter Perugino, whose style his paintings developed. He should not be confused with Pietro di Giovanni D'Ambrogio of Siena.

== Works ==
Lo Spagna is known for a number of major works completed in the region, including the Birth of the Virgin from Spineta in Todi, the Adoration of the Magi of Ferentillo and the Nativity of St Anthony in Perugia.

Giovanni di Pietro completed the decoration of the apse and two chapels of the church of San Giacomo in Spoleto. The records indicate that some thirty inhabitants of the parish contributed payment for the work, which was completed in 1526. The apse vault is frescoed with the Coronation of the Virgin and St James, while after Lo Spagna's death, the chapel frescoes were completed by pupils, Dono Doni and Cecco di Bernardino of Assisi.

The Madonna and Child in Glory with St Sebastian and St Rocco on the far wall of the church of Campello sul Clitunno was completed by one of his pupils from a preparatory drawing by Lo Spagna. The apse of the church of San Giovanni Battista in the small village of Eggi contains a fresco completed by a hand from Lo Spagna's studio working from a drawing by the artist. For the church of San Martino, Lo Spagna completed the large altar-piece of Coronation of the Virgin, (1522), which today hangs in the Museo Civico of Trevi. The church of Madonna delle Lacrime was Lo Spagna to complete the fresco decorations in the chapel dedicated to St Francis (1518). Around 1520 Lo Spagna decorated the first altar to the right of the church of Sant'Agostino in Visso with frescoes, now found in the Collegiata di Santa Maria. Lo Spagna painted a fresco cycle for the parish church of San Michele Arcangelo in Gavelli, a hamlet in the township of Sant'Anatolia di Narco near Perugia.

The famous Sposalizio, or Marriage of Joseph and Mary, in the museum at Caen, attributed to Perugino, has been credited to Lo Spagna by scholars in the past.

== Collections ==
The Capitoline Museums in Rome now possess a series of life-sized fresco figures by him, representing Apollo and the Nine Muses.

The National Gallery, London, has three paintings by Lo Spagna, two small panels depicting Christ Carrying the Cross and Christ at Gethsemane that were once probably two wings of a portable altarpiece; and a larger panel of The Agony in the Garden, all dated to perhaps 1500-05.

== Personal life ==
Lo Spagna married Santina Martorelli from one of Spoleto's leading families and here he was nominated Capitano delle Arti dei Pittori e degli Orefici in 1517. He died in 1528, possibly of the plague.

== Pupils ==
Lo Spagna had various pupils and followers, among them Bernardino Campilius.

== Gallery ==
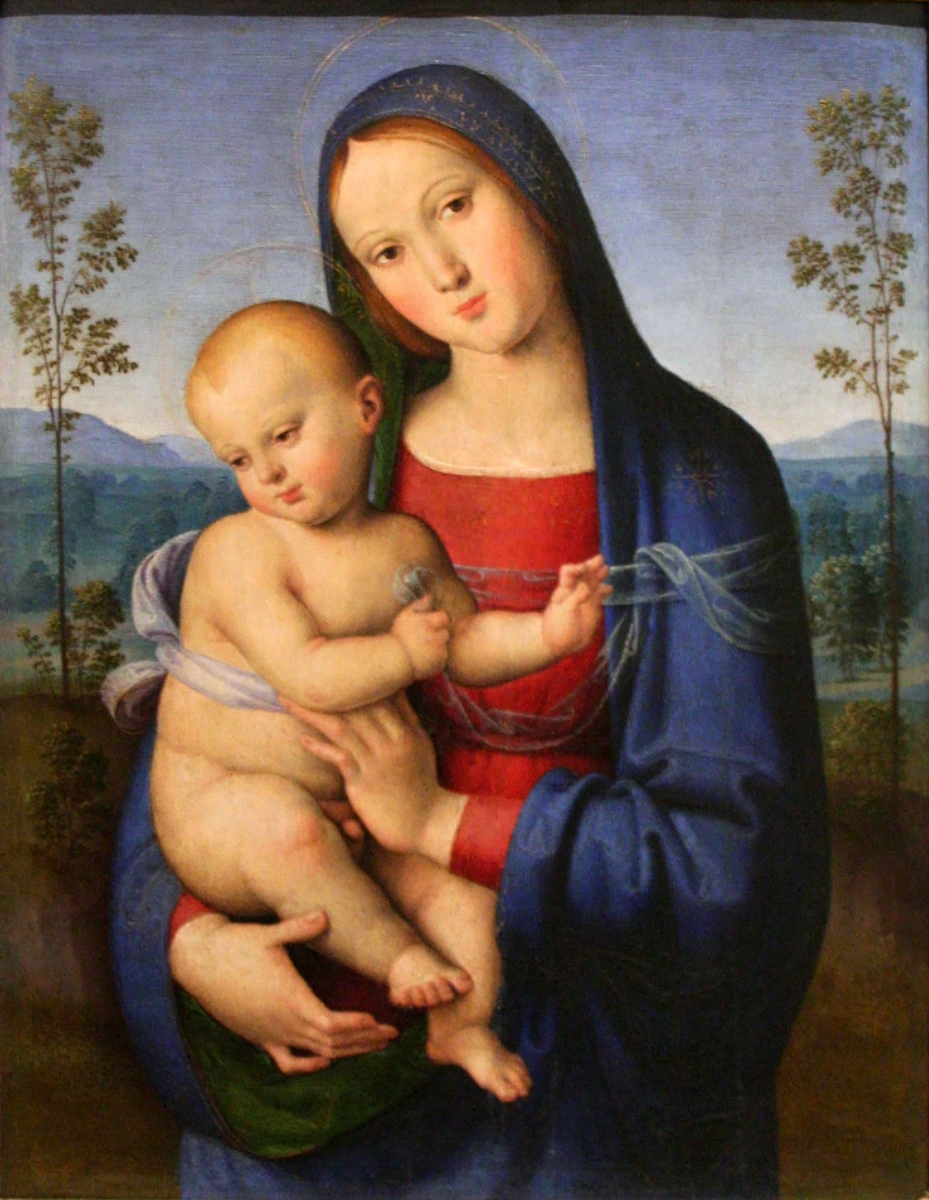
Madonna and Child (date unknown), the Louvre, Paris

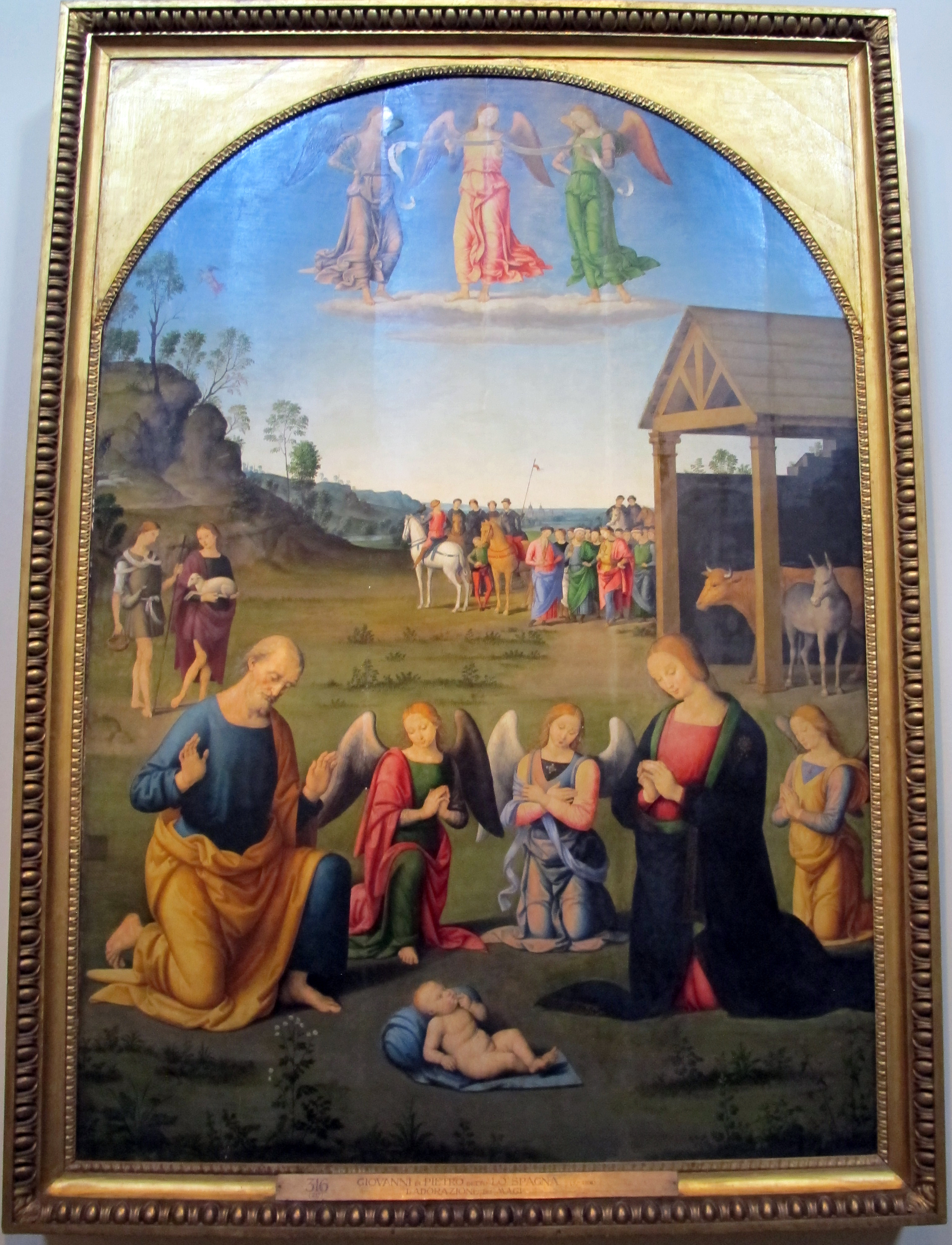
Adoration of the Magi (date unknown), Pinacoteca Vaticana

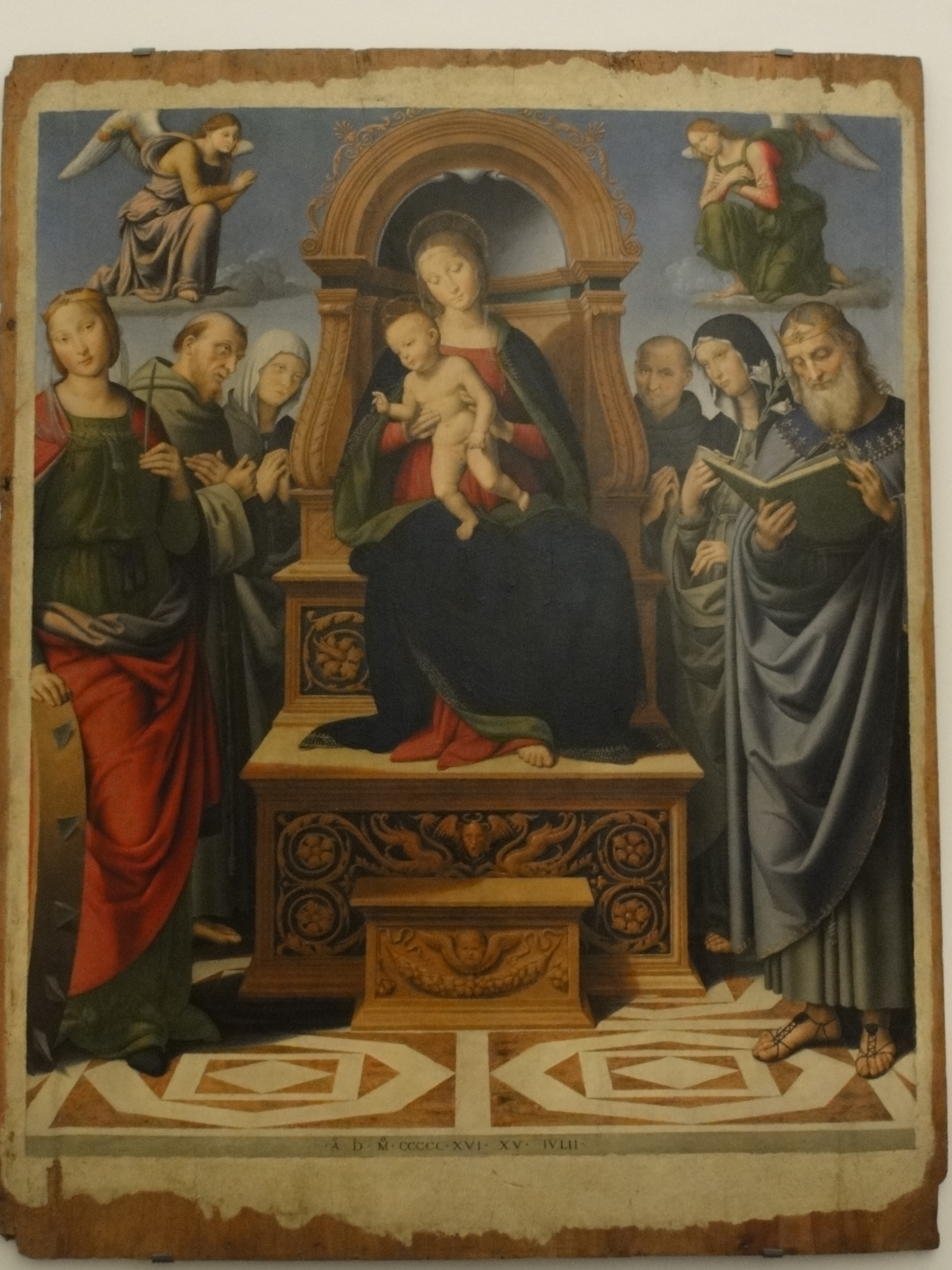
Madonna and child with saints and angels (1516) Treasure Museum, Assisi
