= Palazzo del Capitano =

Civic Palace in Todi, Italy

Coordinates: 42.78221°N 12.40684°E

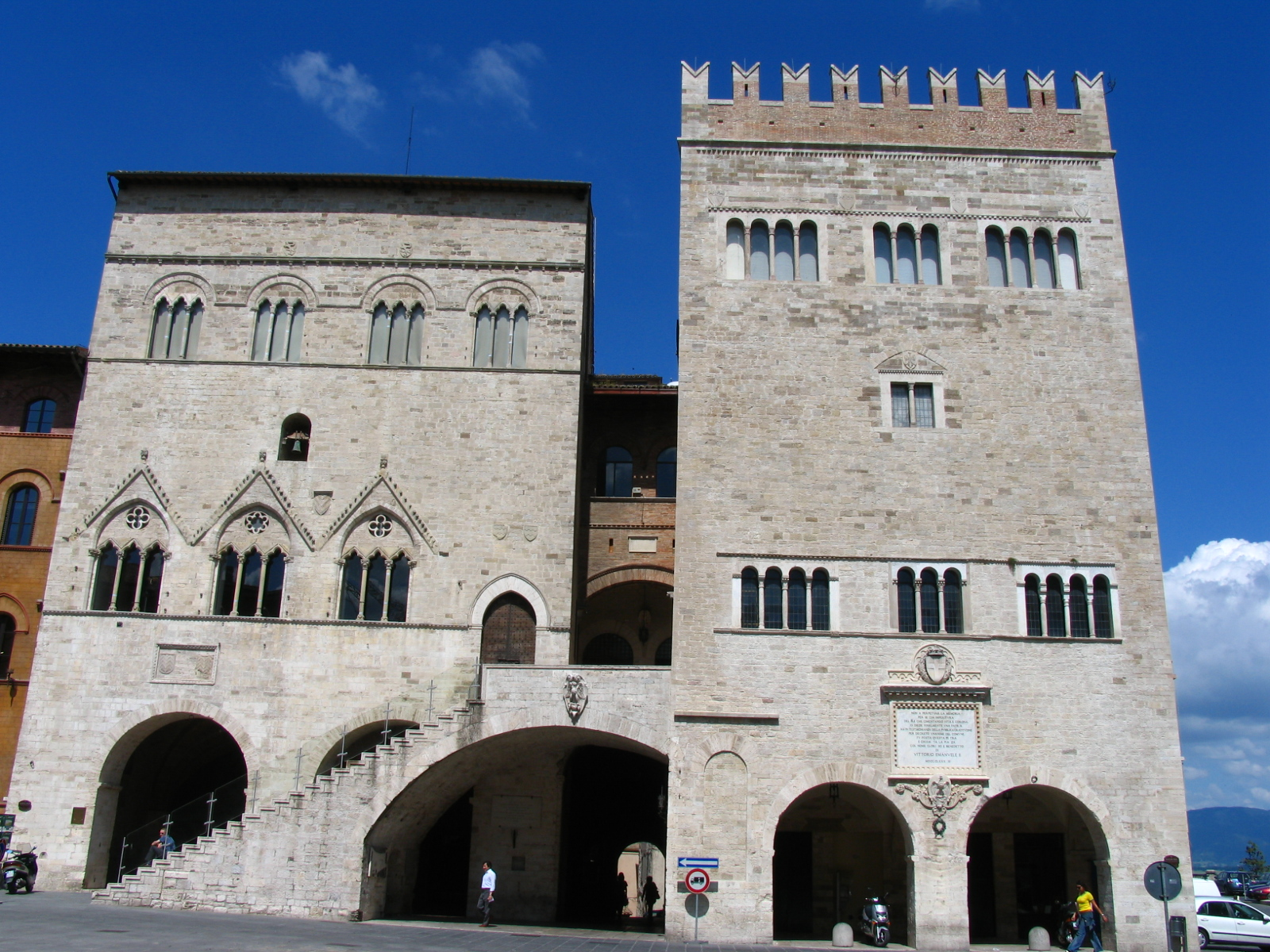
Palazzo del Capitano on the left; on the right is the earlier Palazzo del Popolo

Palazzo del Capitano is a Gothic architecture, late 13th-century civic palace in Todi, Italy.
