= Pietro di Giovanni D'Ambrogio =

Italian painter

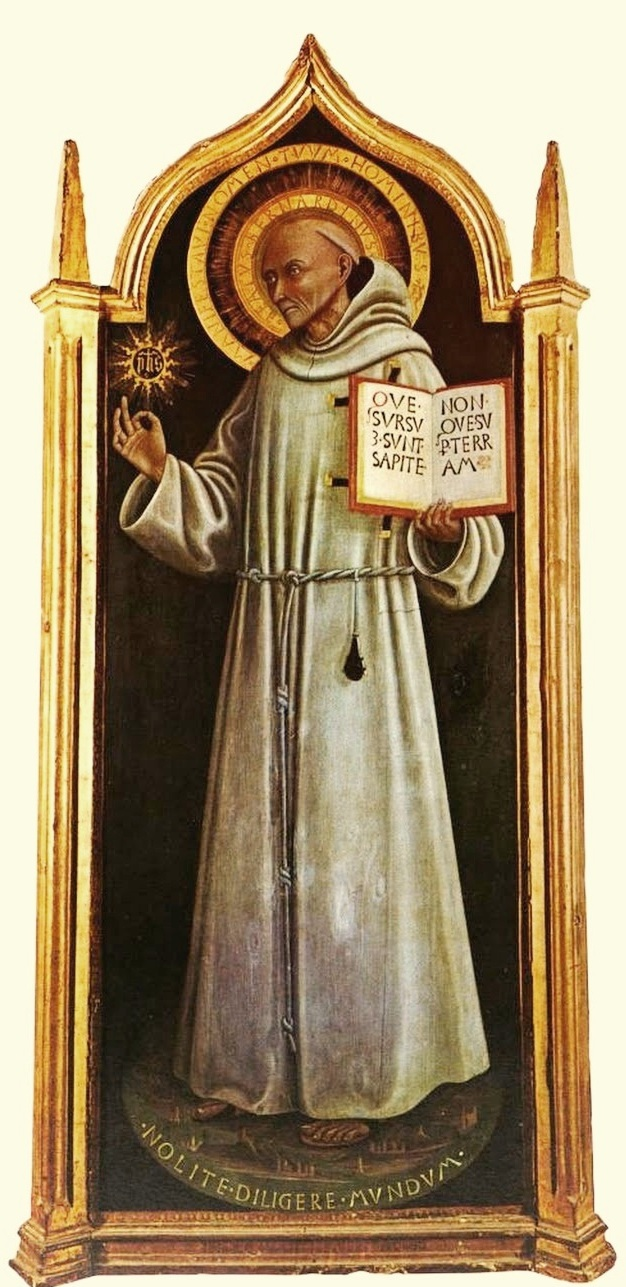
Portrait of Saint Bernardino

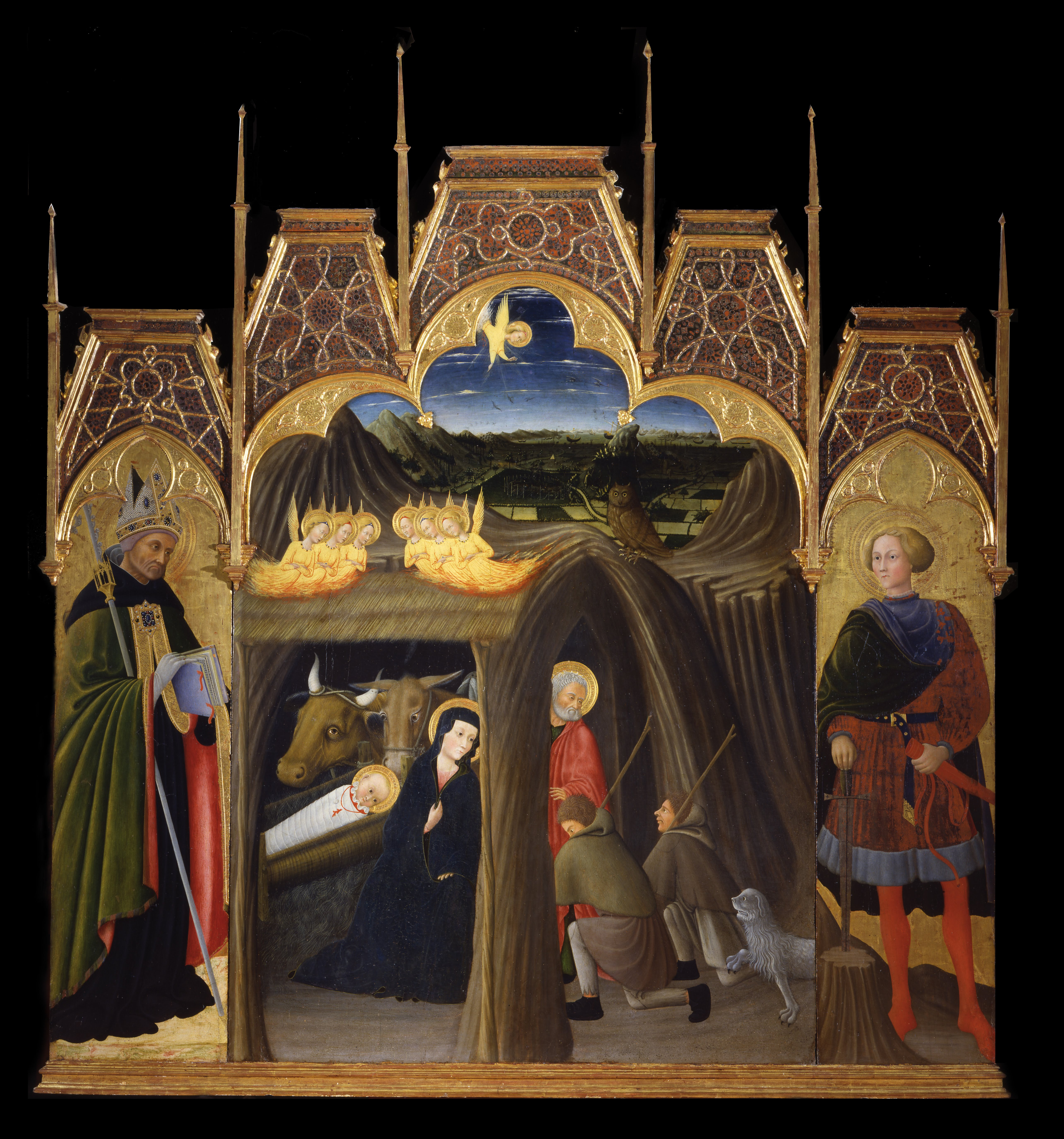
Adoration of the Shepherds

Pietro di Giovanni D'Ambrogio (fl. 1410–1449) was an Italian painter of the Sienese school.

== Life and work ==
He was apparently born in Siena and may have studied with Stefano di Giovanni, known as "Il Sassetta". In 1428, he became a member of the Painter's Guild. Most of his surviving pieces date from the 1430s and 1440s. The first major work that is still extant is an altarpiece depicting the adoration of the shepherds with Saint Augustine and Saint Galgano, which dates from between 1430 and 1435 and may have been based on earlier works by Ambrogio Lorenzetti or Bartolomeo Bulgarini. Some of his works were also once attributed to Il Sassetta.

Documents from 1440 indicate that he received payment for some works done in the Città di Castello, but the nature of those works is not mentioned. That same year, he worked on frescoes at the Hospital of Santa Maria della Scala (now a museum), but these have been destroyed.

In 1444, following the death of the Franciscan priest, Bernardino (who would later become a saint), he painted a portrait of him based on his death mask, for the Basilica dell'Osservanza, which is now preserved at the Pinacoteca Nazionale. Some art historians have seen the influence of Masaccio in a set of panels from a predella, now divided between the Brooklyn Museum and the Lindenau Museum.

In 1446, he painted the Crucifixion mural at the Siena City hall (Palazzo Pubblico) and two years later, completed another depiction of Saint Bernardino in Lucignano. He may have also participated in painting the cloister at the Monastery of the Holy Saviour in Lecceto. He and Vecchietta worked on а pair of reliquary shutters at Siena Cathedral; now in the Pinacoteca. Numerous small works from the late 1440s have been attributed to him.

In addition to his artwork, he also provided miniatures and illustrations for various books; notably the Tractatus de Principatu (1446), now in the Biblioteca Trivulziana, and an Antiphonary, which is held by the Free Library of Philadelphia.

== Sources ==
- C. Volpe (ed.) Il Gotico a Siena: miniature, pitture, oreficerie, oggetti d'arte (exhibition catalog, Palazzo Pubblico), Centro Di, 1982. ISBN 978-88-7038-058-3.
- Giulietta Chelazzi Dini, et al., Five Centuries of Sienese Painting: From Duccio to the Birth of the Baroque, Thames and Hudson, 1998. ISBN 978-0-500-23756-4.
- Max Seidel (ed.), Da Jacopo della Quercia a Donatello. Le arti a Siena nel primo Rinascimento, (exhibition catalog), Federico Motta Editore, 2010. ISBN 978-88-7179-602-4.
