= Todi =

- Comune
- Comune di Todi
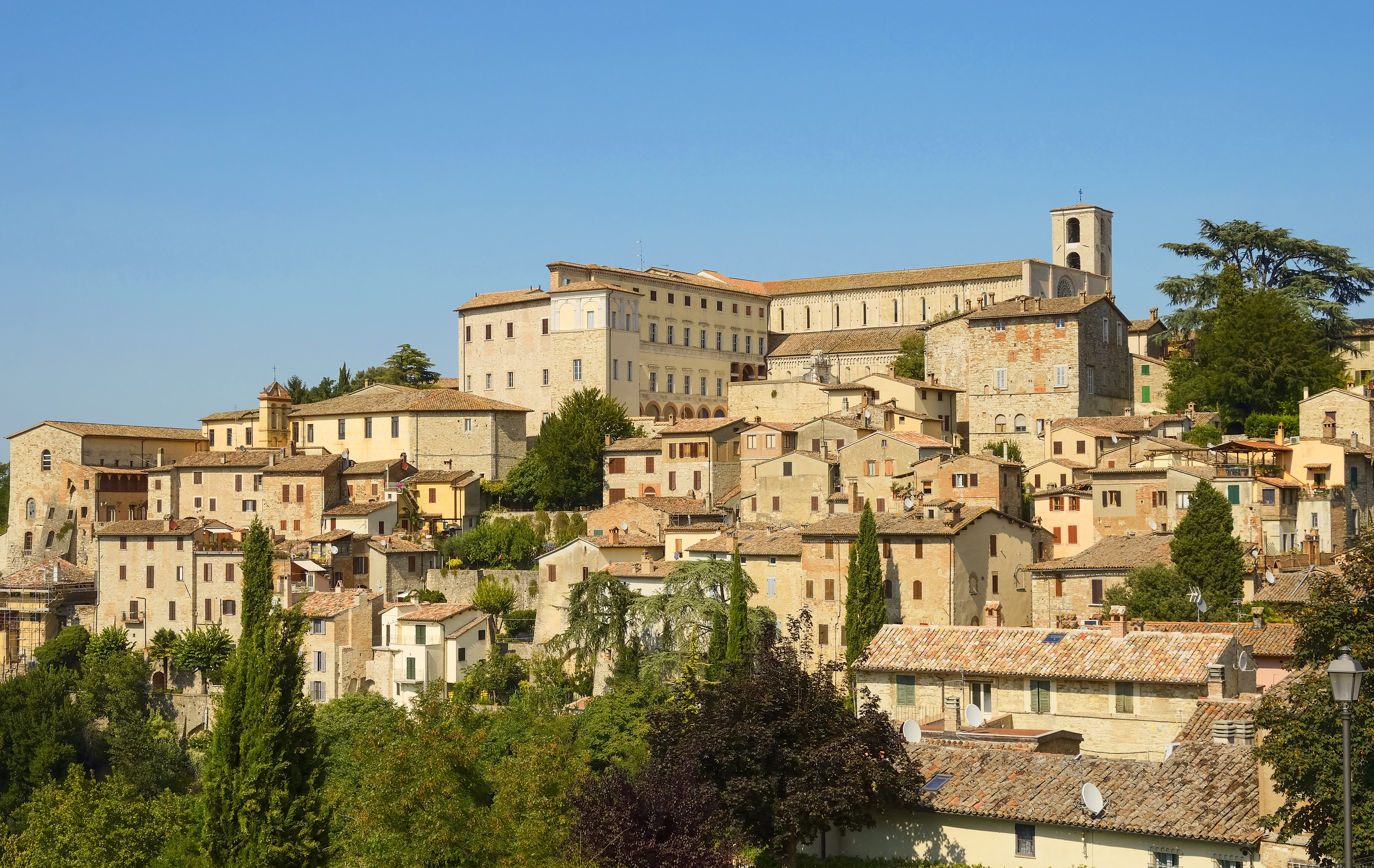
- Panorama of the town

- Coat of arms

- Location within Italy Location within Umbria
- Coordinates: 42.782004°N 12.406926°E
- Country: Italy
- Region: Umbria
- Province: Perugia (PG)

Government
  - Mayor: Antonino Ruggiano (FI)

Area
  - Total: 223 km^{2} (86 sq mi)
- Elevation: 410 m (1,350 ft)

Population (1 January 2025)
  - Total: 15,481
  - Density: 69.4/km^{2} (180/sq mi)
- Demonym: Tuderti or Todini
- Time zone: UTC+1 (CET)
  - Summer (DST): UTC+2 (CEST)
- Postal code: 06059
- Dialing code: 075
- Patron saint: St. Fortunatus
- Saint day: October 14
- Website: Official website

Todi (Italian pronunciation: [ˈtɔːdi]; Tuder in antiquity) is a town and comune (municipality) of the province of Perugia (region of Umbria) in central Italy.

It is perched on a tall two-crested hill overlooking the east bank of the river Tiber, commanding distant views in every direction. It was founded in antiquity by the Umbri, at the border with Etruria; the gens Ulpia of Roman emperor Trajan came from Todi.

== Etymology ==
Todi was founded by the Umbri, in the 8th-7th century BC, with the name of Tutere. The name means "border", the city being located on the frontier with the Etruscan dominions.

== History ==
=== Mythical founding ===
Todi has a legendary foundation sometimes placed as early as 2707 BC and linked to a Veii-Umbri tribe. According to one foundation legend, the first furrow was traced under the guidance of an eagle, in the area behind what is now the cathedral district. Another tradition connects the town's early development to environmental change: after the Tiber broke through the Forello gorges and the marshy valley drained, settlement is said to have expanded.

=== Antiquity ===
Todi, ancient Tuder (Greek Τοῦδερ), was one of the most important Umbrian cities and minted its own coinage bearing the ancient name Tutere. Its name does not appear before the Roman conquest.

Todi was situated on the frontier between Umbrian and Etruscan areas, and had a strong Etruscan cultural influence before Roman conquest. The Roman conquest is placed in the 3rd century BC, after which Roman customs replaced the earlier Umbrian-Etruscan culture.

The earliest historical notices concern a prodigy occurring at the time of the invasion of the Cimbri and Teutons. Shortly thereafter it was taken by Crassus during Sulla's civil war. Under Augustus it received the name Colonia Julia Fida Tuder, and its colonists were soldiers of the 41st legion (Legio XXXXI). Inscriptions attest that it was a flourishing and important city in the imperial period, and it is mentioned by the principal geographers among the cities of Umbria.

Todi, as shown in the Tabula Peutingeriana, lay on the Via Amerina between Amelia and Perugia. Silius Italicus records it as a place renowned for the cult of Mars and provides details of its location. Todi was enrolled in the Clustumina tribe.

The first city walls are dated to the 2nd–1st century BC. In the late Roman period a second ring of walls was built.

=== Early Middle Ages ===
The elevated position of Todi made it a strong and important place during the Gothic War and after the fall of the Western Roman Empire. During the barbarian invasions it shared the fate of other Italian cities, although chronicles relate that it was spared slaughter and fire through the care and zeal of Saint Fortunatus, bishop of the city. This event is commemorated annually on 30 June with mention in the liturgical offices.

In 552 Narses won a victory near Todi against the Goths, and Totila lost his life there. In 590 the exarch of Ravenna, Romanus, occupied the city along with other places in the Duchy of Rome; it then passed to the Lombards and was repeatedly contested among their dukes.

Todi was sacked by the Lombards, although it avoided full-scale devastation. Christianity was spread through Saint Terentian. Over time the bishop's authority came to be recognized, and diocesan boundaries are described as following earlier Roman civic structures.

After the excommunication of Leo III the Isaurian in 726, Pope Gregory II brought the Duchy of Rome, including Todi, under the authority of the Church. Disputes arose between Desiderius, king of the Lombards, and Pope Paul I over the boundaries of the territory of Todi, and these were settled in 757 with a formal act preserved in the local archive.

In 773, at the request of Pope Adrian I, Charlemagne defeated Desiderius and ended the Lombard kingdom, confirming and enlarging the temporal power of the Church. Louis I confirmed to Pope Paschal I in 817 the dominion over Rome, its duchy, and other territories including Todi. In 1002 Pope Sylvester II and Emperor Otto III were in Todi, where they celebrated Christmas; the following day a council of Italian and German bishops was held to resolve a dispute concerning Thangmar and the bishop of Hildesheim.

=== High Middle Ages ===
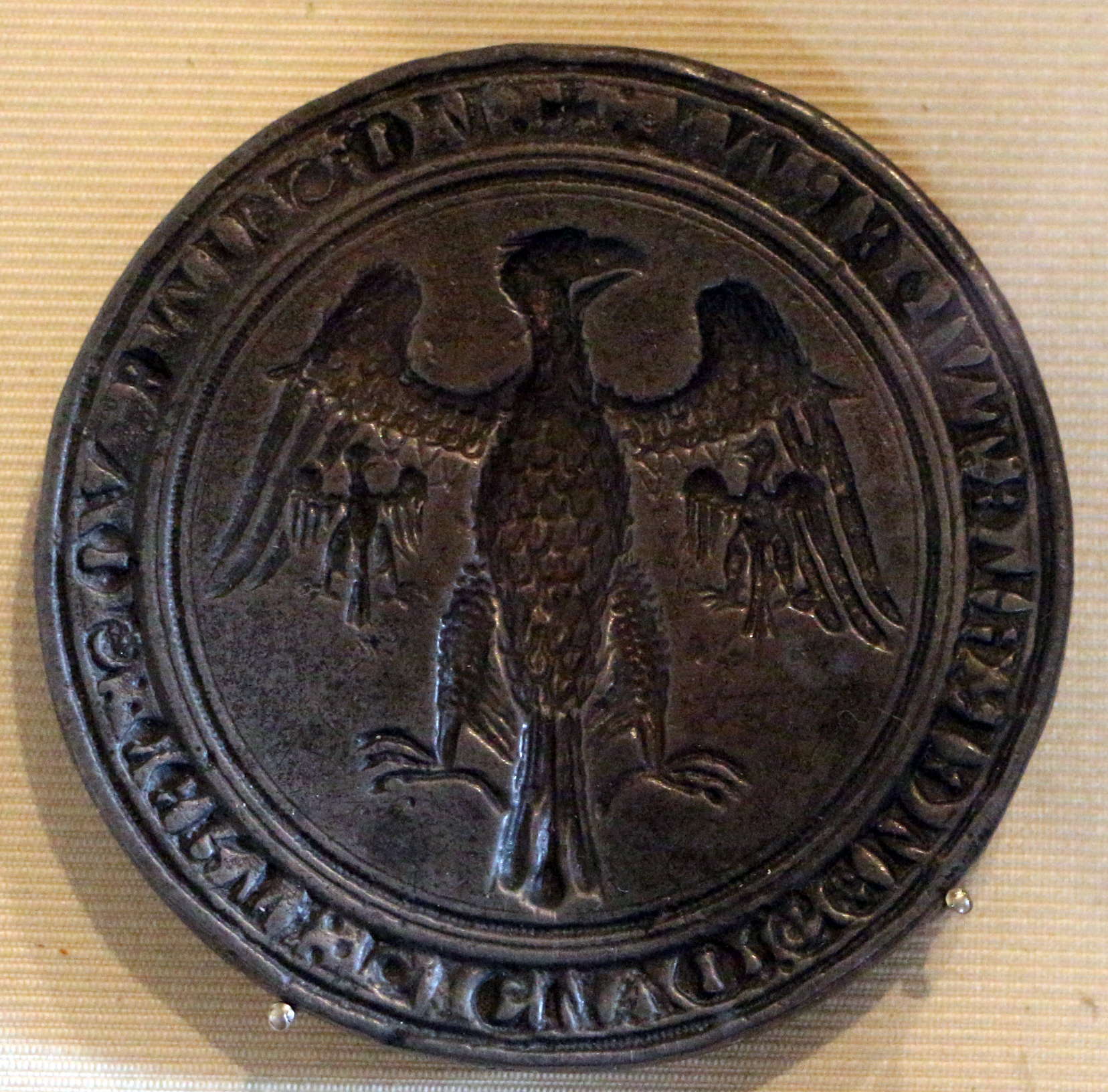
Municipal seal of Todi, c. 1290

In the 11th century Todi established a free commune with two consuls responsible for administration and justice. In 1054, during war between Perugia and Assisi, Todi and Foligno supported Assisi, which had placed itself under imperial authority. Violent conflicts followed. Two years later the Assisians, Todians, and Folignates marched against Orvieto over territorial disputes near a mountain; the Orvietans, with strong forces, advanced toward Marsciano, then held by the counts of Burgundy, and with the aid of Perugia entered Todi, devastating it by fire and sword before withdrawing.

Toward the end of the 11th century Todi was under the rule of the countess Matilda. In the 12th century it was torn, like other Italian cities, by the factions of Guelphs and Ghibellines. Among the notable families identified are the Atti family, associated with the Guelph side, and the Chiaravalle family, associated with the Ghibellines.

Frederick I and Henry VI occupied the Duchy of Spoleto and the county of Assisi and took possession of Todi. In 1198 Innocent III recovered these territories, personally visited Todi, confirmed his authority, received oaths from the barons, and consecrated altars in churches.

In 1204 Todi appointed its first podestà, Spagliagrano da Bologna, who was required to be an outsider; the podestà held judicial authority. Administrative power was attributed to decurions, and from 1250 a people's captain operated alongside the podestà. The municipal system included ten priors, a general council, a secret council, auditors, and two district heads.

In 1208 Amelia and in 1224 Terni submitted to Todi, paying annual tribute. Todi also subjected Giove in 1220, Messenano in 1234, and Firenzola in 1256.

In the mid-13th century a third ring of walls was built. From 1237 Todi belonged to a league of Guelph Umbrian cities, aligned more closely with Perugia, and it resisted Frederick II.

In 1264 Urban IV was received there returning from Orvieto, where he had instituted the feast of Corpus Christi. In 1266 the Guelphs of Perugia fought against Todi and Amelia, ravaging their territory.

In 1268 Todi was ruled by Ugolino of the counts of Baschi, a powerful lord possessing numerous fiefs. In 1292 it subjected Giano. Boniface VIII increased the wealth of the churches of Todi, especially enlarging the capitular revenues, and granted honors and privileges to the city.

=== Late Middle Ages ===
In 1311, during the absence of the pope from Italy, Todi reorganized its militia, fixing it at 10,000 cavalry and 3,000 infantry, and built fortifications and strongholds throughout its territory. Ugolino was succeeded by Bindo, leader of the Ghibelline faction, who in 1313 received envoys from Henry VII seeking military aid. Todi also provided assistance to several neighboring cities.

In 1323 Todi, besieged by Vico dei Prefetti, was aided by Uguccione Ricci, gonfaloniere of Florence. In 1319 Orazio di Egidio Astancolli held power but soon relinquished it due to rivalries. In 1328 the antipope Nicholas V took refuge in Todi and, joined by Louis of Bavaria who had elevated him, despoiled the church of San Fortunato of its treasures before departing for Pisa.

Under John XXII, Todi occupied Orvieto and made it tributary; the pope placed the city under interdict from Avignon. Innocent VI later absolved it after it renounced control of Orvieto, restoring its privileges. During the period of Cola di Rienzo, Todi received a banner from Rome and sent an embassy in thanks. In 1327 the municipality lost its autonomy, coming under direct Church rule through agreements associated with Cardinal Albornoz.

The local Monte di Pietà was founded in 1351.

Urban V sought to restore papal authority, including over Todi, which resisted but ultimately submitted while retaining exemptions and privileges. Under Gregory XI, Todi joined revolts and supported the antipope Clement VII before returning to obedience in 1387.

In 1392 Boniface IX granted Todi to Malatesta of Rimini for ten years at an annual tribute. After rebellion, the grant passed to Andrea Malatesta, though unrest led to his withdrawal. In 1416 Braccio Fortebracci entered Todi, received its submission, and reinstated exiles, causing concern in Perugia. Peace followed the election of Martin V in 1417. In 1428 Perugians and Todians were reconciled.

In 1432 Eugene IV granted Todi to Francesco Sforza with conditions; Sforza later seized territories of the Church. In 1433 he invaded Todi and neighboring cities. He was recognized as vicar general, and Todi secured confirmation of its laws and statutes. Subsequent conflicts led to its occupation by Niccolò Piccinino, and in 1444 Sforza recovered it.

Todi hosted Pope Nicholas V in 1449 during a plague in Rome and Pope Pius II in 1459 for about a month. Emperor Frederick III, returning from Rome, was honored by an embassy from Todi and granted the city the right to adorn its coat of arms with the imperial crown. Paul II rebuilt the fortress.

In 1474 internal conflicts between factions led to violence and destruction. Intervention by Perugia and papal forces followed. Further factional struggles occurred in 1488 and afterward, with devastation of the countryside and severe reprisals.

=== Early Modern and contemporary period ===
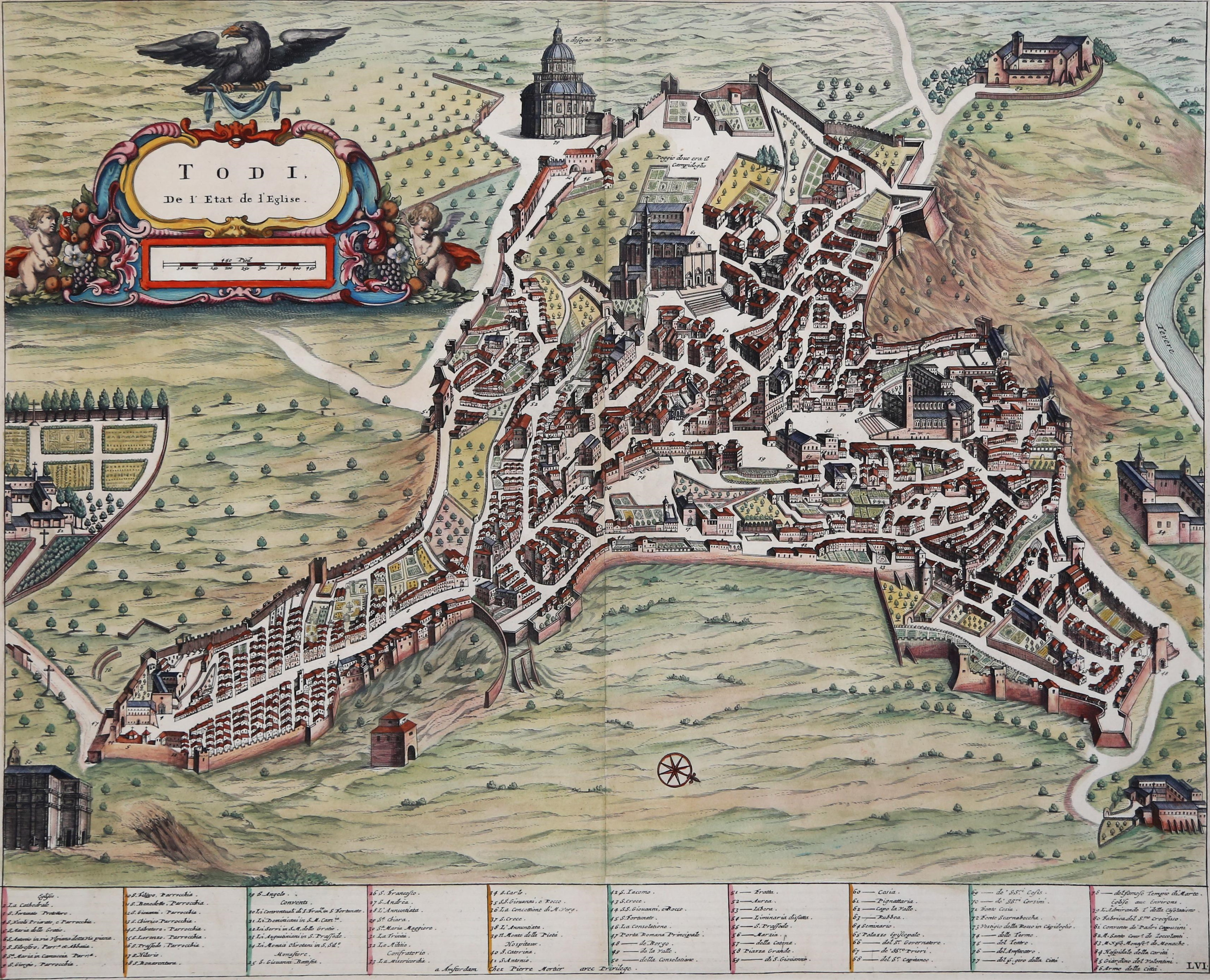
Bird's-eye view of Todi, engraved by Joan Blaeu, 1704

A plague in the 16th century killed more than two thirds of the population.

A period of prosperity is placed between 1566 and 1606 under Bishop Angelo Cesi. During the pontificates of Urban VIII and Innocent X it remained loyal to Rome despite wider conflicts.

In the 17th century the town entered a phase of decline, attributed to plagues, wars, and famines, with a marked drop in population.

In 1809, during the Napoleonic period, the Papal States were annexed to the Napoleonic Empire and the Trasimeno Department was created; Todi received district-seat status together with Spoleto, Perugia, and Foligno. In 1814 Papal administration was restored. From 1860 Todi joined the Kingdom of Sardinia and subsequently the Kingdom of Italy.

In the mid-19th century, Todi had a population of 14,263: 4,606 within the city and 9,657 in 36 frazioni and rural dwellings.

== Geography ==
Todi stands on a high hill at an elevation of 447 metres (1,467 ft) above sea level, on the left bank of the Tiber, about 40 kilometres (25 mi) from Perugia and 18 kilometres (11 mi) from Spoleto. The town stands between the streams Rivo and Naia, which flow on the left into the Tiber irrigating the plain below. The climate is described as temperate.

The city has a triple circuit of walls. The highest and smallest, enclosing the entire city, is built of large regular blocks of travertine without mortar and is attributed to the Etruscans; Roman inscriptions are visible. The second circuit, also of travertine, was constructed by the Romans centuries later. The third was built around the 13th century and extends for about 3 miles (4.8 km).

=== Subdivisions ===
The municipality includes the localities of Aproli, Brusco, Cacciano, Camerata, Casaciottoli, Case Basse, Casemasce, Cecanibbi, Chiesa Lorgnano, Chiesa San Sisto, Chioano, Colvalenza, Colvalenza Palombara, Due Santi, Fiore, Frontignano, Ilci, Izzalini, La Foca, Loreto, Monte Latrone, Montelupino, Montemolino, Montenero, Monticello, Pantalla, Pesciano, Pian di San Martino, Pontecuti, Pontecuti Nuovo, Pontenaia, Ponterio-Pian di Porto, Porchiano, Porzone, Quadro, Ripaioli, Romazzano, Rosceto, San Benigno, San Damiano, San Valentino, Stazione Ponte Rio, Todi, Torrececcona, Torrerosa, Torresquadrata, Torrevecchia, Torriola, Vasciano.

In 2021, 3,878 people lived in rural dispersed dwellings not assigned to any named locality. At the time, the most populous localities were Todi proper (5,159), and Ponterio-Pian di Porto (1,755).

== Economy ==
In the mid-19th century, the economy of Todi was based on agriculture, livestock breeding, and related trade. The surrounding territory was fertile, producing oil, wine, and fruit. In the plains, flax and hemp were successfully cultivated, and wheat, maize, and other grains were sown.

The territory also contained quarries of travertine, yellowish tuff, pozzolana, and, according to some, silver, although no certain information confirmed the latter. Clay suitable for ceramic work was of good quality. Livestock breeding was highly developed and formed an important trade.

The territory was half cultivated with vines and olives and half pasture and woodland with oak and timber trees. Poplar and alder were transported to Rome along the Tiber. Lignite deposits had been discovered, especially near Acquasanta. Notable quarries were located near Cacciano and Pantalla. The territory also contained so-called eagle stones.

Todi had textile production of very fine linen cloths and white fabrics, with about 1,700 pieces placed on the market annually, in addition to large quantities of household cloth, woven goods, cords, and mixed wool textiles. There were two factories producing small pasta and one for pyrotechnics.

The city formerly had a mint and produced coinage.

== Religion ==
=== Cathedral ===
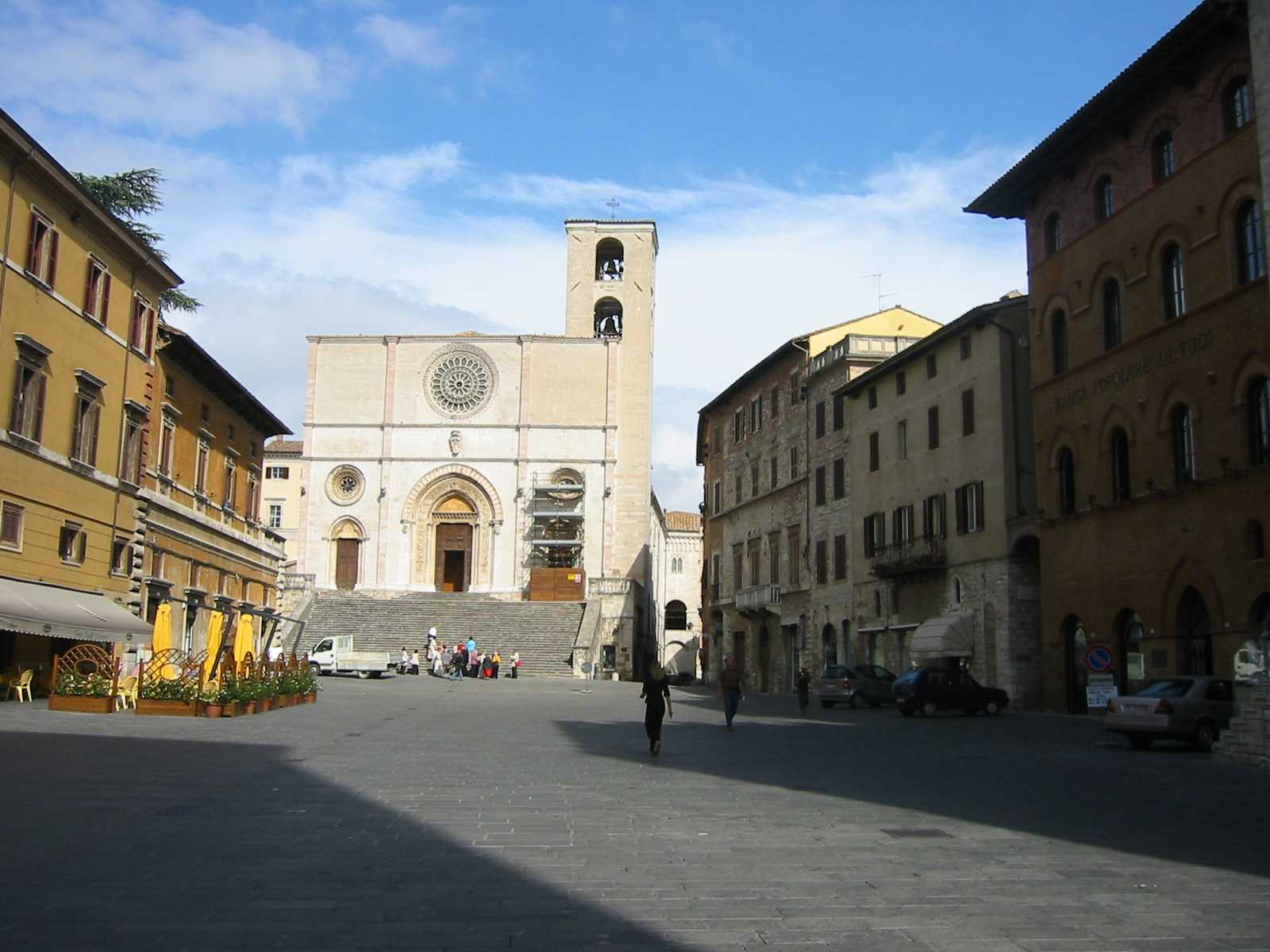
The cathedral in the sloping Piazza del Popolo

The cathedral of Todi was begun in the 12th century, continued in the 13th century and completed in the 14th century. It stands at the highest point of the city in the main square, reached by a staircase of 38 steps.

Its 13th-century façade, with a horizontal termination, was modified several times, most recently in the early 16th century. The lunette contains a marble group of the Virgin seated on clouds with Jesus. At the center is a rose window whose original glass was replaced during the 19th-century renovation of the building with the present glass by Francesco Moretti after designs by Eliseo Fattorini and Giuseppe Francisci. The main portal is decorated with a band of acanthus scrolls culminating in a figure of Christ Blessing. The wooden door includes four upper walnut panels by Antonio Bencivenni da Mercatello, showing the Virgin Annunciate, the Archangel Gabriel, Saint Peter and Saint Paul, while the six lower oak panels were made by Carlo Lorenti on the commission of Bishop Ulderico Carpegna to replace damaged originals. On the right side rises a bell tower, possibly dating to the 13th century.

Inside, the right nave opens through Gothic arches on octagonal columns into a fourth aisle divided into seven chapels. The central nave is higher than the lateral ones, and the arcades rest on alternating pillars and columns, the latter taken from a Roman monument of Todi, while the capitals were made for the church and display varied ornamentation. The front faces of the pillars have capitals decorated with figures of saints in bas-relief. The windows are Gothic and splayed inward.

Among the works there are a fresco of the Nativity by a Perugian master, a stained-glass window of the Baptism of Christ copied from Perugino in 1860 by Eliseo Fattorini, and a panel of the Madonna and Child with Saints Catherine of Alexandria and Roch, painted around 1516 by Giannicola di Paolo. The Gothic altar is documented from 1343 and was modified in 1574 with marble columns; above it hangs a silver chandelier in the form of a double-headed eagle made by Giovanni Giardini. The second altar contains remains of a fresco with God the Father on clouds, flanked by seraphim, Christ crucified, and the Holy Spirit, a work by Giovanni Spagna.

To the left of the presbytery is the Cesi Chapel, whose vault was frescoed by Faenzone. At the head of the left nave stands a marble-inlaid monument to Donna Filippa Uffreduzzi, erected by her son, Bishop Angelo Cesi, in 1609. The presbytery and apse retain 14th-century architectural character, and there are tomb monuments of Giovanni Andrea Cesi and Bishop Angelo Cesi dated 1560 and 1606.

In the crypt are preserved three sculptures from the façade representing the Madonna and Child and an Angel guiding a Bishop and a Saint; the first two are attributed to Giovanni Pisano and the third to the sculptor Rubeus.

The apses belong to the original construction and suggest the richness of their former decoration. The apse contains a fresco of God the Father by Zucchetti of Perugia, while other paintings represent the Annunciation, Saints Peter and Paul, and Pope Saint Martin by Valeri of Rome.

The baptismal font is a finely carved stone work of the 15th century. The chapter preserves two oil panels of Saints Peter and Paul painted in 1516 by Giovanni Spagna, a chased and gilded copper relief, and an elegant 15th-century pastoral staff.

=== San Fortunato ===
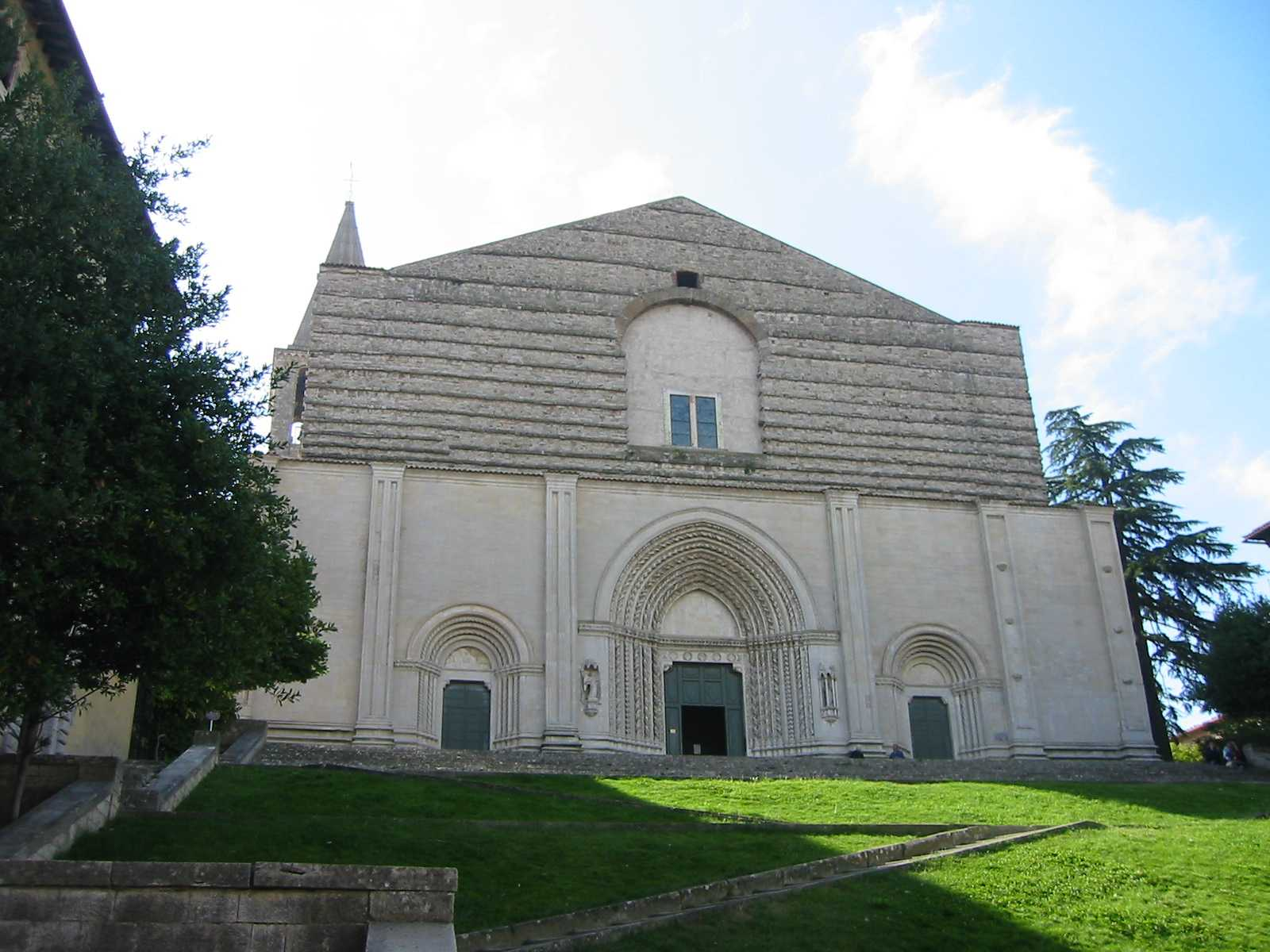
The unfinished façade of San Fortunato

The church of San Fortunato stands above the remains of a complex dating from before the year 1000. It was built by the Order of Friars Minor from a design by an unknown architect. Work began in 1292 and continued until the second half of the 15th century, when it stopped, leaving the church incomplete.

Alongside the church rises a Gothic bell tower of 1460, and nearby is the former convent with its cloister. One bell bears the date 1241.

The façade, in Italian Gothic style, was begun in 1415 and remains incomplete. Its architect was Giovanni di Santuccio. Of the three pointed portals, the central one is decorated with bundles of twisted colonnettes, vine scrolls and small figures, and is flanked by two niches containing a Gabriel and an Annunciate in a style recalling Jacopo della Quercia.

The interior dates to the late 13th century. It has three aisles of equal height, ribbed vaults and a polygonal apse. The high altar is in 14th-century Gothic style. Seven chapels open from the right aisle and six from the left. The church preserves a Madonna and Child with Two Angels of 1432 by Masolino da Panicale, an oil painting by Andrea Polinori dated 1618, and 14th-century frescoes of the Giottesque school. The crypt, built in 1596, houses the relics of the city's five patron saints (Saint Fortunatus, Saint Callistus, Saint Cassian, Saint Romana and Saint Degna) and the tomb of Jacopone da Todi.

In the left nave are works including an Assumption by Fortunato Oddi. The holy water stoups are in Byzantine style. The high altar dates to the 15th century. The choir stalls, richly carved, were executed in 1590 by Antonio Maffei of Gubbio.

In the right nave, the large chapel predates the church. A stone pulpit of the 14th century is set near the entrance. A Coronation of the Virgin signed by Andrea Polinori is present, and a fresco of the Virgin and Child is attributed to Nicola di Giovanni. Other paintings are by Polinori and Oddi. The church gives access to the municipal secret archive which contained important manuscripts and documents.

The adjoining convent has a portico dating to the 12th century and preserves traces of frescoes by Nicola di Vannuzio of Todi.

The church was stripped of its treasures by Louis V. The poet Paolo Rolli is buried there.

=== Santa Maria della Consolazione ===
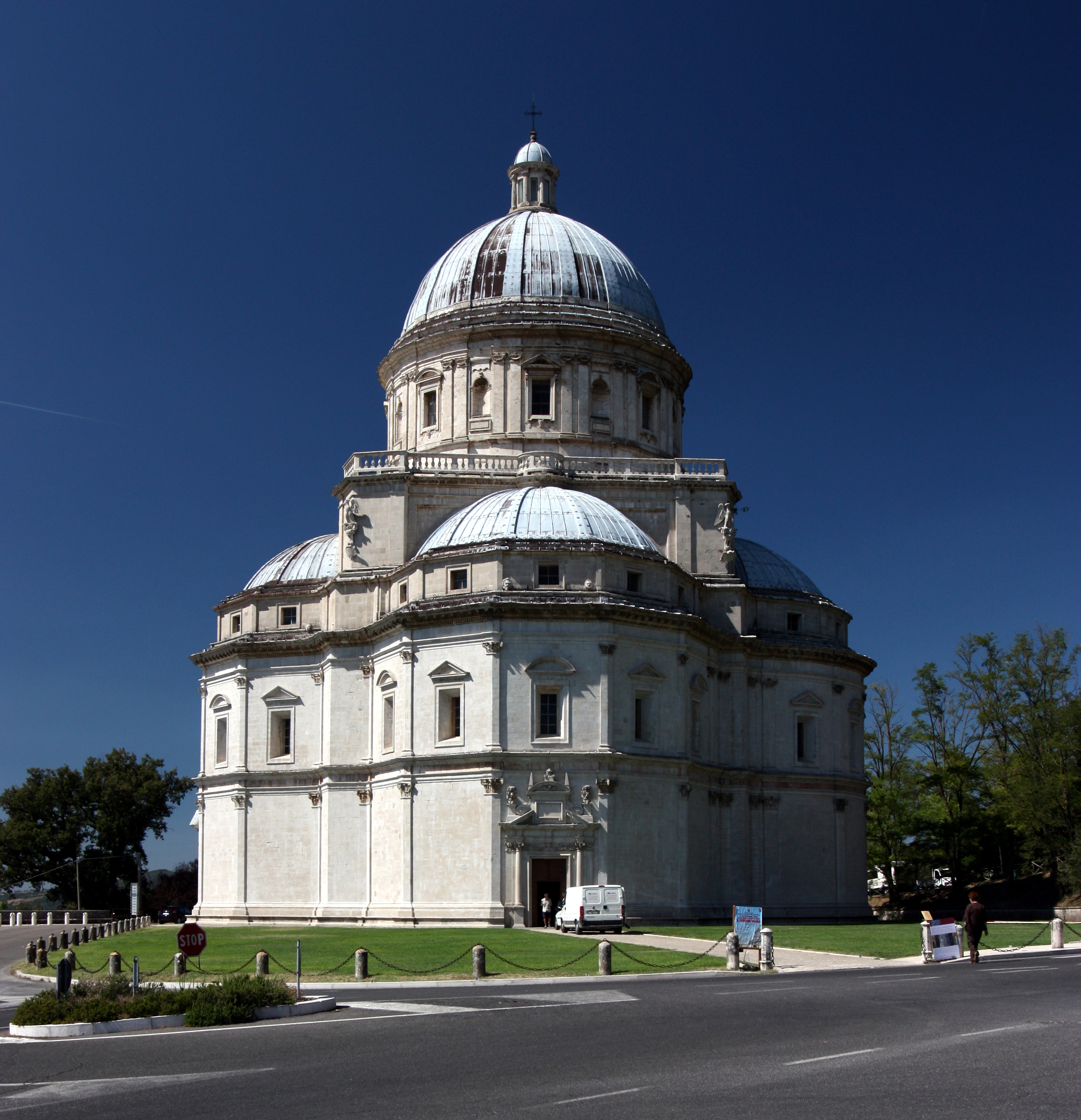
Santa Maria della Consolazione, early 16th century: the central Greek-cross plan with apsidal transepts recalls Bramante's first plans for St Peter's.

The church of Santa Maria della Consolazione was built on a centralized plan in keeping with Renaissance ideals of balance and spatial unity.

The building has a Greek-cross plan with four apses, three polygonal and one, on the north side, semicircular. Each apse is articulated by two orders of Corinthian pilasters, above which are windows made to a design by Valentino Martelli in 1587. At the crossing, a dome rises over four corner piers with pendentives and arches decorated in relief. The church is entered through three portals: the east portal is Baroque and dates to the 17th century, the south portal to 1713, and the west portal was designed by Luigi Poletti in 1846.

The exterior has a double order of lesenes and Corinthian capitals at the corners, linked by bases and projecting cornices. The upper order is marked by alternating windows with triangular and curved pediments. Inside, the architectural elements dividing the space are made of light-colored stone. Four large eagles bearing the insignia of the municipality stand between the apses. These were executed by Antonio Rossignolo between 1601 and 1604. Other architectural elements were carried out by Ambrogio da Milano, Francesco da Vita, and Filippo de Salvi.

The church was built to house a Marian icon to which the population of Todi attributed numerous graces; it is still preserved in the Baroque altar of the north apse. The building was constructed with stone taken both from the demolition of the fortress and from the travertine quarries of Titignano. It was carried out on a project attributed to Bramante, although the attribution remains under study despite 16th- and 17th-century documents naming him as the designer.

Work began on 15 November 1508 on the site of a pre-existing 15th-century chapel and lasted a century, concluding in 1607. Construction was directed by Cola da Caprarola until 1512, followed by various master builders, architects and sculptors. During the work, consultation was sought from Baldassarre Peruzzi, Antonio da Sangallo the Younger, Galeazzo Alessi, Vignola and Ippolito Scalza. Interior decoration involved Filippo Meli for the archivolts, Giovan Battista Gardona da Ligornetto and Francesco Casella for the pendentives, and Andrea Polinori, who designed the high altar executed by the sculptor Angelo Pieri in 1612. A sacristy was added on the north side in 1613 and demolished in 1862.

=== San Francesco ===
The church of San Francesco contains paintings including an Immaculate Conception with Saint Clare and Saint Teresa by Valeri, and in the apse a Marriage of the Virgin by Agresti. Another altar has a Saint Francis by Valeri. The convent choir dates to the late 15th century. The altar is decorated with a triptych of the Virgin and saints with scenes from her life.

In the refectory is a large fresco of the Last Supper by Polinori dated 1592, along with figures of saints. The so-called Scala Santa is also decorated with scenes of the Passion by the same artist.

The church preserves the body of Saint Cassian, second bishop of Todi, martyred in 304 under Diocletian, and that of Saint Fruttuoso, martyred in 528.

=== San Nicolò ===
The church of San Nicolò was built in the 14th century, of which the façade with its entrance and circular window remains. Later restorations in the 18th century altered the rest. The apse fresco belongs to the school of Polinori. The site previously held an older 13th-century church dedicated to the same saint.

Notable works include a painting of the Virgin receiving the marriage ring from a Perugian school, a Crucifix with Mary and Saint John from a 15th-century Foligno school, damaged frescoes by Giovanni Spagna, and a signed oil painting dated 1640 by Bartolomeo Barbiani.

=== Santa Maria in Camuccia ===
The church of Santa Maria in Camuccia dates to the 13th century, though only the north and west sides retain the original character. Its crypt, reworked in the 14th century, is entirely decorated with 15th-century frescoes of Sienese school depicting scenes including the Virgin and Child, Saint Joseph, the Crucifixion, Saint Catherine, the Annunciation, the Coronation of the Virgin, and other subjects.

=== Monte Santo ===
The church of Monte Santo formerly housed a notable painting by Lo Spagna. It contains a 16th-century wooden carving of Christ, the Virgin, Saint John, and angels, a Nativity fresco attributed to Domenico Alfani, and an apse fresco of Foligno school.

=== Sant'Antonio ===
The church of Sant'Antonio has a vaulted ceiling covered with frescoes depicting God the Father, angels, and saints. On the entrance wall are allegorical figures of Charity and Prosperity, and above the high altar is a painting of the Stories of Saint Anthony. These works were executed between 1632 and 1657 by Poliziano and his school.

=== Convent of the Santissima Annunziata ===
The convent of the Santissima Annunziata contains frescoes in the refectory and adjoining rooms by Barbiani and his school, depicting the Nativity, the Annunciation, Saint Francis, Saint Helena, Saint Fortunatus, Saint Francis of Paola, Saint Barbara, and other saints. The chapel of the Madonna has a large fresco attributed to Alunno or one of his pupils.

=== Other religious buildings ===
The church of the Servants of Mary contains at its high altar a colossal white marble statue of Saint Philip Benizi by Gian Lorenzo Bernini. The saint is preserved in a silver urn.

The church of San Filippo reflects early 16th-century architecture and has a single nave. The statue of Saint Philip on the high altar is generally attributed to Bernini.

The church of Santissimo Crocifisso was built in 1523 and displays richly ornamented architecture.

The church of the Reformed Franciscans contains a notable painting by Lo Spagna on the high altar and a fresco attributed to Perugino.

The church of San Benedetto preserves a fine 15th-century sculpted statue of Saint Benedict.

The church of Santa Margherita contains an Annunciation at the high altar recalling the style of Sassoferrato. The convent refectory once had extensive frescoes, largely lost, including a Last Supper dated 1587.

The church of San Silvestro, also known as Santa Maria del Carmine, contains signed works by Polinori and by Poliziano.

The church of Sant'Ilario has a façade reflecting Gothic style.

San Carlo is a small Romanesque and Gothic-style church on Viale San Carlo.

San Giuseppe dei Falegnami is a small Baroque-style, Roman Catholic church from 1612.

== Culture ==
=== Piazza del Popolo ===
Piazza del Popolo occupies the highest point of Todi, on the summit of Colle Nidoli at 398 metres (1,306 ft) above sea level. It was the area of the Roman forum and became the center of the medieval and modern city. Around it stand the principal buildings of civic and religious authority: Palazzo del Popolo, Palazzo del Capitano, Palazzo dei Priori, and at the opposite end the cathedral of the Santissima Annunziata.

The square is supported by a system of monumental Roman cisterns built to sustain the forum above. These cisterns form part of an underground route that also includes wells, galleries and cisterns from different periods.

=== Palazzo del Popolo ===
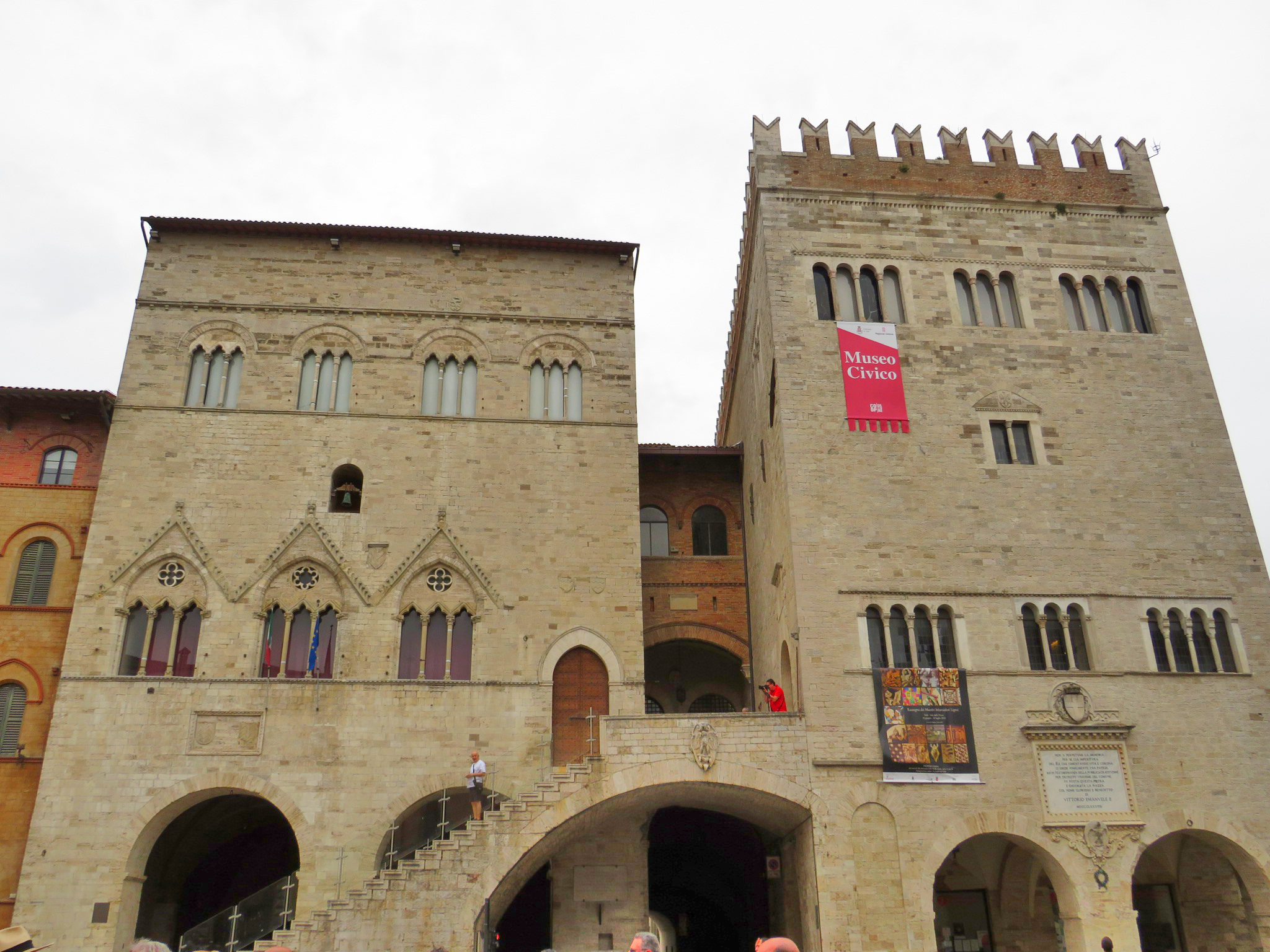
Palazzo del Popolo and Palazzo del Capitano, connected by an elevated passage

Palazzo del Popolo was built at the beginning of the 13th century, it is reportedly one of the oldest public palaces in Italy. Also known as Palazzo del Podestà or Palazzo del Comune, it served as the seat of the podestà, the foreign magistrate attested in Todi from 1201 with a six-month term of office.

The original structure, modeled on communal palaces of northern Italy, consisted of a portico on the ground floor and, on the first floor, a meeting hall for the city's General Council, which elected the consuls. The podestà's residence occupied adjoining rooms and was connected to the main block in 1228. The building was later raised by an additional story and its entrance moved to the present side. In 1267 the podestà Pandolfo Savelli had the monumental staircase built that gave access to the first floor of both palaces, where the representative halls of civic power were located.

In 1523 a bell tower was added, and in the early 20th century Giuseppe Sacconi and Getulio Ceci restored the building and added the crenellated crowning. The façade on the square, in Gothic style, is characterized by a low portico and two orders of poliforas. A 17th-century overpass connects it to Palazzo del Capitano. The upper floors house the Museo Civico Pinacoteca, reopened in 1997.

Later it became the residence of the cardinal commissioner. A bronze eagle of the 14th century is mounted on the exterior. The Palazzo Comunale houses a picture gallery containing a large tempera panel by Giovanni Spagna dated 1511, along with other works including panels of Saint Fortunatus and Saint Francis, a Saint Bernardino by Spagna, and a Nativity of Venetian school.

=== Palazzo del Capitano ===
Palazzo del Capitano stands beside Palazzo del Popolo, set slightly back from it. Built at the end of the 13th century to house meetings of the council, it was the second public palace erected on the square and was also known as Palazzo Nuovo.

The façade is marked by Gothic decorative forms. On the ground floor two large round arches lead to the so-called voltoni, a porticoed area that originally housed the crossbowmen guarding the palaces and the square; until the 16th century it was entered through four corner doorways. On the first floor are three Gothic windows formed by multilobed triforas with tympanum-like motifs lighting the large hall, which preserves remains of 14th-century frescoes. This room originally served as the Capitano's court of justice and is now used as the council hall. On the upper level, four triforas under round arches open onto the rooms of the Museo Civico Pinacoteca. The museum occupies the top floor of both Palazzo del Capitano and Palazzo del Popolo, which are linked by a 17th-century overpass. The municipal museum was established in 1871.

=== Palazzo dei Priori ===
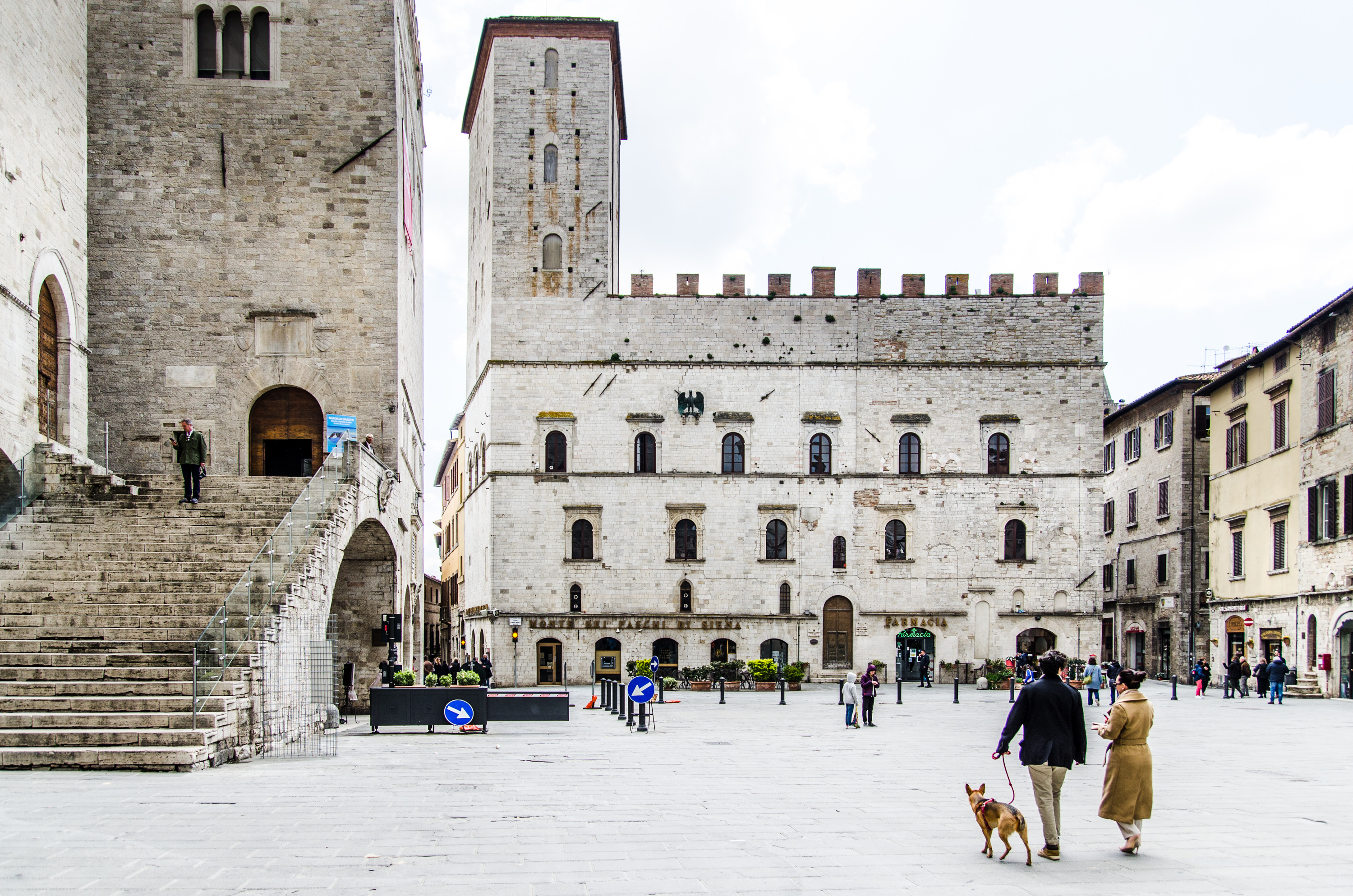
Palazzo dei Priori

The Palazzo dei Priori occupies the south-east side of the main square and date to the 13th century. Inscriptions include a Roman and a medieval one referring to the peace of 1267, above which is a sculpted eagle.

=== Other cultural sites ===
Fonte Cornabecchi was built in 1311 by the imperial vicar Giacomo di Pietro Cornabecchi. It now survives as a small portico with seven columns and richly decorated capitals.

Palazzo degli Atti was built in 1552 by Viviano Atti, with brick construction and travertine decoration, crowned by a prominent cornice.

Palazzo Vescovile is located at the left of the Cathedral, the Bishop's Palace was built in 1593 by Cardinal Angelo Cesi at his own expense. His crest is visible over the great portal, attributed to Vignola. The upper floors include a room frescoed by Ferraù Fenzoni and a gallery frescoed by Andrea Polinori in 1629.

=== Other cultural aspects ===
Among the local culinary traditions is piccioni alla todina, prepared with pigeon, cured ham, onion, garlic, sage, black olives, capers, red wine, chicken broth, olive oil, salt and pepper.

In the early 1990s, Richard S. Levine, a professor of Architecture at the University of Kentucky, included Todi in academic design exercises aimed at conceiving hypothetical improvements to the city and was flown out to present at a conference promoting agritourism around Todi titled "The Sustainable City of the Past and the Sustainable City of the Future". The Italian press relied on the conference's press release which incorrectly stated that he had done research that found Todi to be the world's most livable city. This false claim has persisted for years after the conference in guide books and other publications about Todi.

== Archeology ==
=== Roman forum ===
The forum of Todi covered a larger area than the present square, extending beneath the current Cathedral, westward under the buildings facing the communal palaces, and south toward the area now occupied by the Palazzo dei Priori. This extent is shown by the preserved travertine paving.

The forum underwent several phases of rebuilding, visible in differences in the paving. Beneath the surface lay a system of water storage structures. These consisted of two parallel blocks of underground chambers cut into the clay subsoil, where rainwater was collected and stored for daily use. Part of the eastern group remains accessible through a later opening, when one chamber was reused as a cellar.

The forum also hosted political activity. A series of small pits used in voting procedures has been identified, along with concrete bases that likely supported statues in the square.

The area still functions as the main center of the city, marked by major public buildings such as the communal palaces, the Palazzo dei Priori, and the Cathedral.

=== Cisterns ===
The cistern system of Todi formed part of the infrastructure beneath the forum. It consisted of underground chambers designed to collect and store rainwater. These chambers were cut into the clay layers of the subsoil and arranged in parallel blocks. They provided a reliable water supply for daily use.

Some parts of the system remained in use in later periods, when individual chambers were adapted for domestic functions such as storage.

=== City walls ===
The ancient fortifications of the Umbrian-Etruscan city remain visible at the summit, constructed of large travertine blocks. Additional remains include travertine columns discovered around 1860 in the cellar of the Cocchi house, with adjoining structures resting upon stretches of the Etruscan walls. An arch along the street from Borgo Ulpiano to the main square incorporates materials from earlier Etruscan constructions.

The city walls and supporting structures of Todi were shaped by the unstable nature of the hill on which the city stands. The subsoil, prone to water saturation, caused landslides and structural damage over time.

Roman engineers addressed these problems by building a network of drainage tunnels to remove excess water. They also constructed large retaining structures to stabilize the slopes and prevent collapse.

These works are still visible along the sides of the hill. Examples include the large bastion above the Fosso delle Lucrezie on the north side and the structure forming the base of the complex of San Fortunato to the south.

=== Nicchioni ===
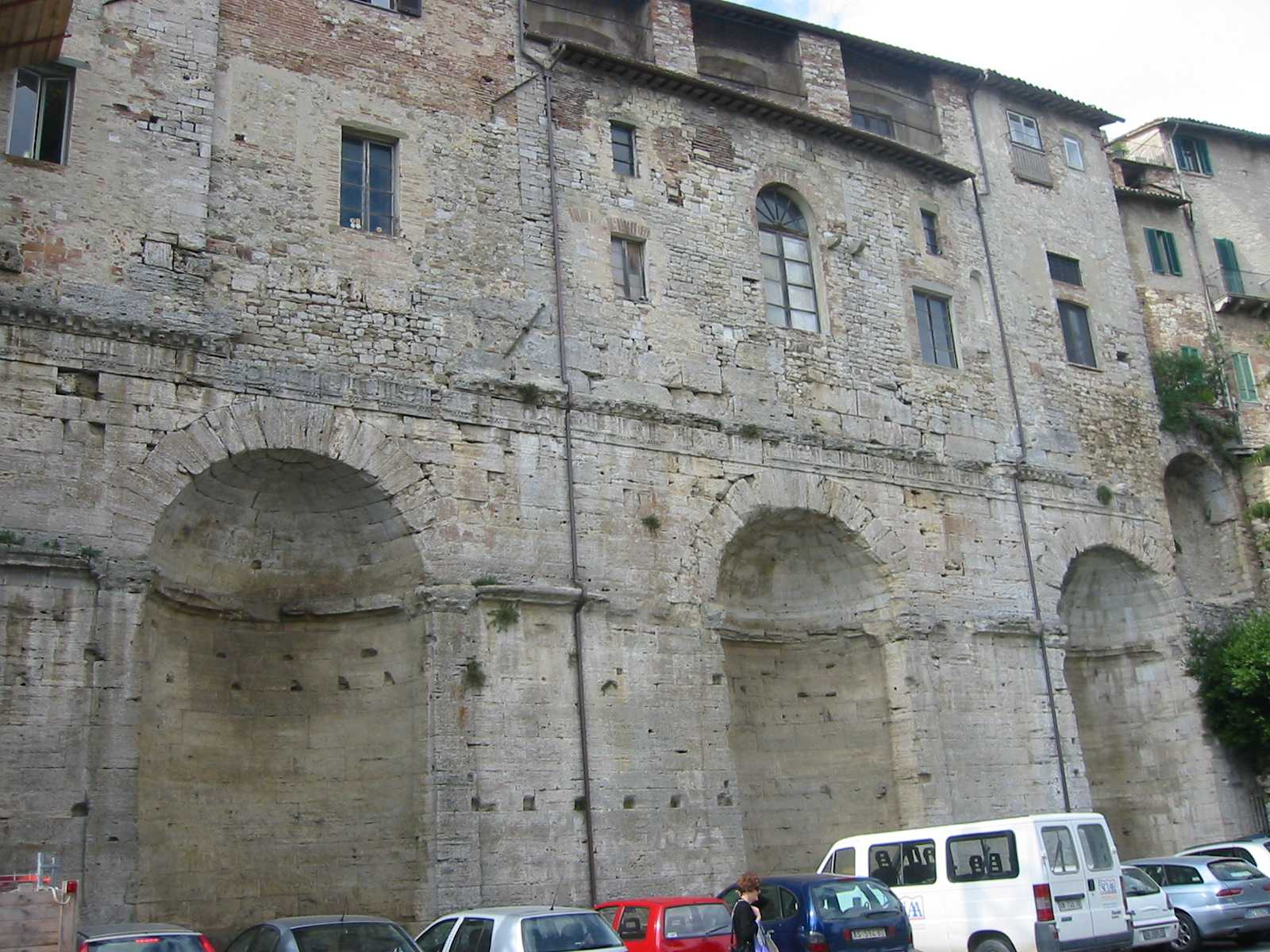
Nicchioni, Roman-era constructions

The Nicchioni is a large retaining structure on the southern slope of the hill, built to support the upper part of the city. Its position made it visible from the roads in the valley below and gave it a prominent role in the landscape.

The structure includes a series of niches, which led earlier interpretations to identify it as part of a temple of Mars. Later study has shown that it is a massive foundation structure.

The Nicchioni is more than 9 metres (30 ft) deep and built in concrete, with an outer facing of travertine slabs and blocks. Above the niches ran a decorative band with metopes and triglyphs, and above that a parapet belonging to an upper terrace or square.

Inside the structure are a drainage tunnel and a cistern used for water collection. One of the niches contained a black and white mosaic with marine motifs, likely part of a nymphaeum attached to the structure.

=== Amphitheater ===
The amphitheater of Todi belongs to the urban expansion of the Augustan period. It was built outside the city walls, following a common pattern in Roman Italy. Its location reflects both the lack of space within the older city and the need to allow access to people from the surrounding countryside and nearby settlements.

Only limited remains survive, but they are enough to establish its size. Nearby, along the adjacent road, there are sections of wall with niches built in concrete and faced with travertine. These formed part of the structures supporting the ground below the amphitheater.

Parts of the amphitheater are still visible within the church of San Nicolò de Cryptis, built inside the arena, and in nearby houses, where sections of corridors and walls have been preserved.

=== Other archeological heritage ===
Roman remains include parts of a theatre identified in Via Cesia beneath the Gentili house. Traces of baths with mosaic floors survive in Via del Colle and beneath Palazzo Cicchitelli.

Numerous Roman inscriptions have been discovered in Todi and its surroundings. Etruscan objects from local necropolises are of notable importance, including the Mars of Todi, a bronze statue of Mars now in the Gregorian Etruscan Museum and a richly furnished tomb of a priestess discovered in 1886 in the locality of Peschiera, later placed in the National Etruscan Museum in Rome.

Along the so-called Via delle Rovine are Etruscan constructions; on the nearby hill of Montesanto are remains of a temple of Mars, and elsewhere are amphitheatres, theatres, baths, aqueducts, and mosaics. Two Roman bridges of travertine, built of large blocks without mortar and each with a single arch, cross local torrents.

== Sports ==
=== A.S.D. Todi Calcio ===
Associazione Sportiva Dilettantistica Todi Calcio is an Italian association football club, based in the city.

Todi currently plays in Serie D group E.

== Notable people ==
Todi is the birthplace of several notable figures, including Fra Jacopone da Todi, associated with the hymn Stabat Mater; Pope Martin I; the cardinals Raniero di Castelvecchio, Matthew of Aquasparta, Azzone, Teodino, and Francesco of the Atti family; Antonio Montemarte, distinguished in war against the Turks; Arminio Cori, who served France, the Church, and Venice; Fra Raniero, a 15th-century Dominican mathematician; Massarello da Todi of the counts of Coldimezzo; Angelo da Todi; the sculptor Pietro da Todi; and the priest Giuliano, skilled in stained glass.

The emperor Trajan belonged to the Ulpia gens originating from Todi. Bernardino da Todi served as a military captain of the Republic of Florence; Bartolomeo d'Alviano commanded armies of the Papal States and the Republic of Venice; Polidoro Uffreduzzi served under Charles V; and Armellino Cori was a military leader in 1510 in the service of France, Venice, and the papacy.

Fra Raniero da Todi was a noted mathematician in 1461. Francesco Fino was professor of medicine at Perugia in 1496. Antonio Pasini translated Plutarch's Lives from Greek. Vincenzo Caroccio was a renowned jurist. Andrea Piselli was named imperial poet in 1687. Antonio and Andrea Polinori were distinguished painters of the Carracci school, and Giovanni da Todi was a painter in the time of Raphael. Giuliano da Todi excelled in stained glass, and Luigi Alvi was noted for fine craftsmanship.

The nobility of Todi included numerous knights of various orders, including Giacomo Montemarte who became Grand Master of the Order of Malta in 1290.

Benedetto Caetani, the later Pope Boniface VIII, started his career as a Canon in the Cathedral of Todi in 1260. He never forgot his roots in Todi, later describing the city as "the dwelling place of my early youth," the city which "nourished me while still of tender years," and as a place where he "held lasting memories."
