= Palazzo dei Priori (Todi) =

Palace in Todi, Italy

Coordinates: 42.78170°N 12.40679°E

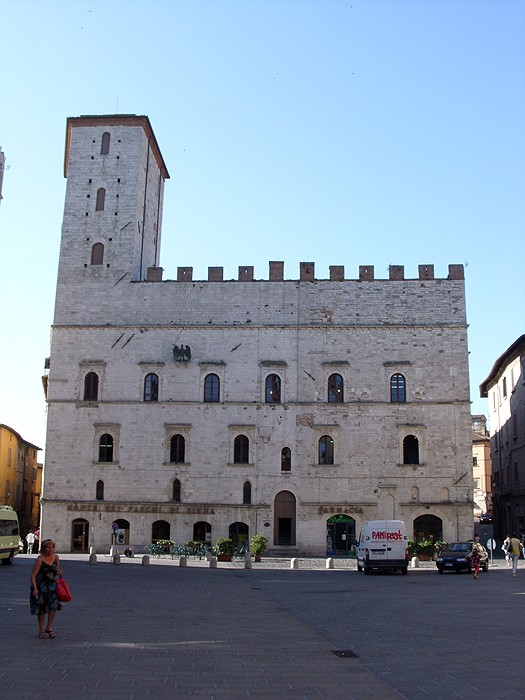
Palazzo dei Priori

Palazzo dei Priori is a palace in Todi, Italy.

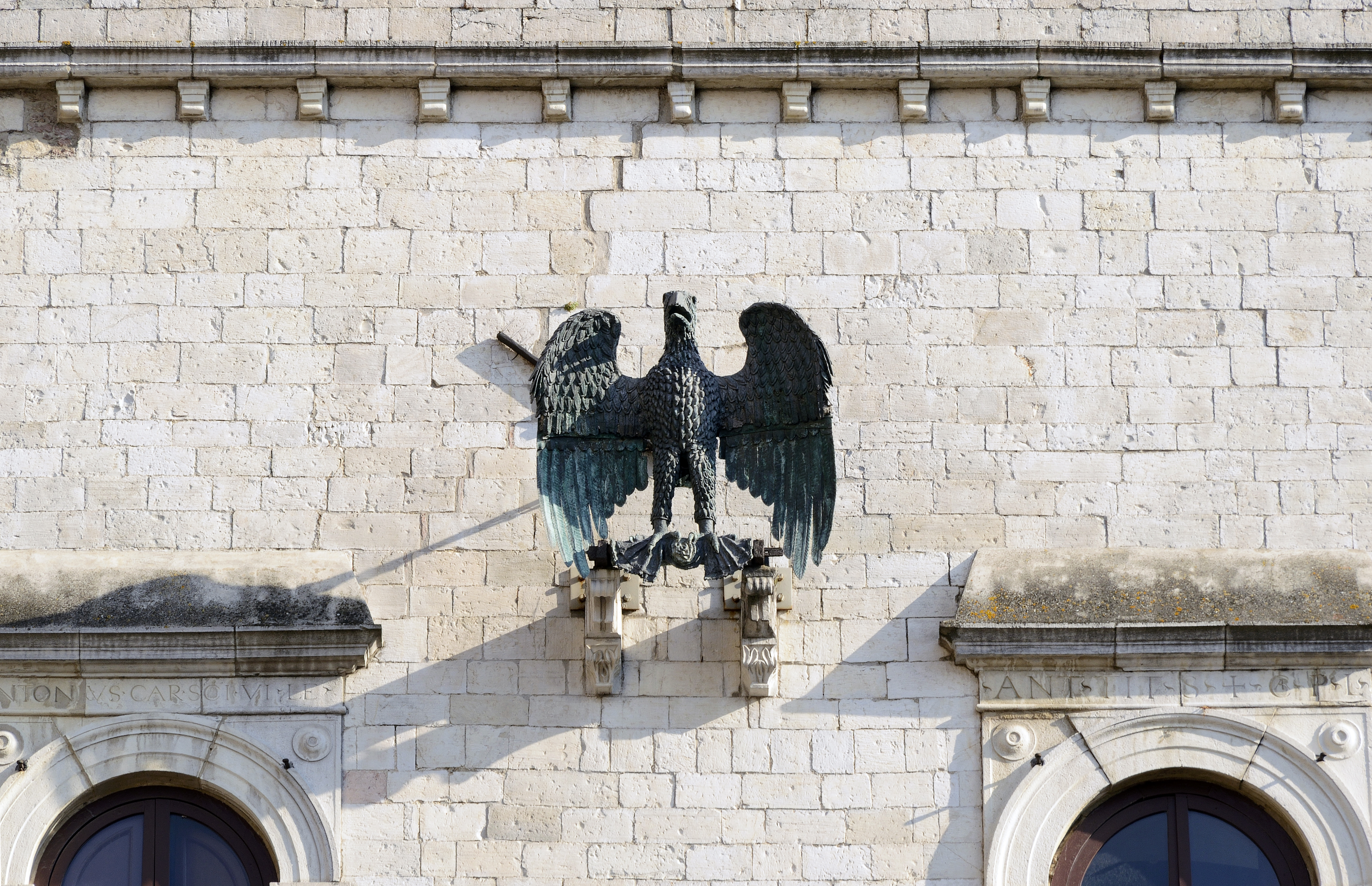
Eagle of Todi

On the third floor is a bronze eagle sculpture, l'Aquila di Todi (1339) or Tuderta, by Giovanni di Gigliaccio. Among the legends justifying the use of this symbol in Todi, one holds that the early pre-Roman inhabitants had planned to site the town in the valley next to the River Tiber, but a sheet used to map out the locale was snatched by an eagle and deposited on the hilltop. The inhabitants took this augur as a sign to relocate.
