= Chialli =

Chialli is a surname. Notable people with the surname include:

- Giuseppe Chialli (1800–1839), Italian sculptor, brother of Vincenzo
- Vincenzo Chialli (1787–1840), Italian painter
