= Marsciano =

- Comune
- Comune di Marsciano
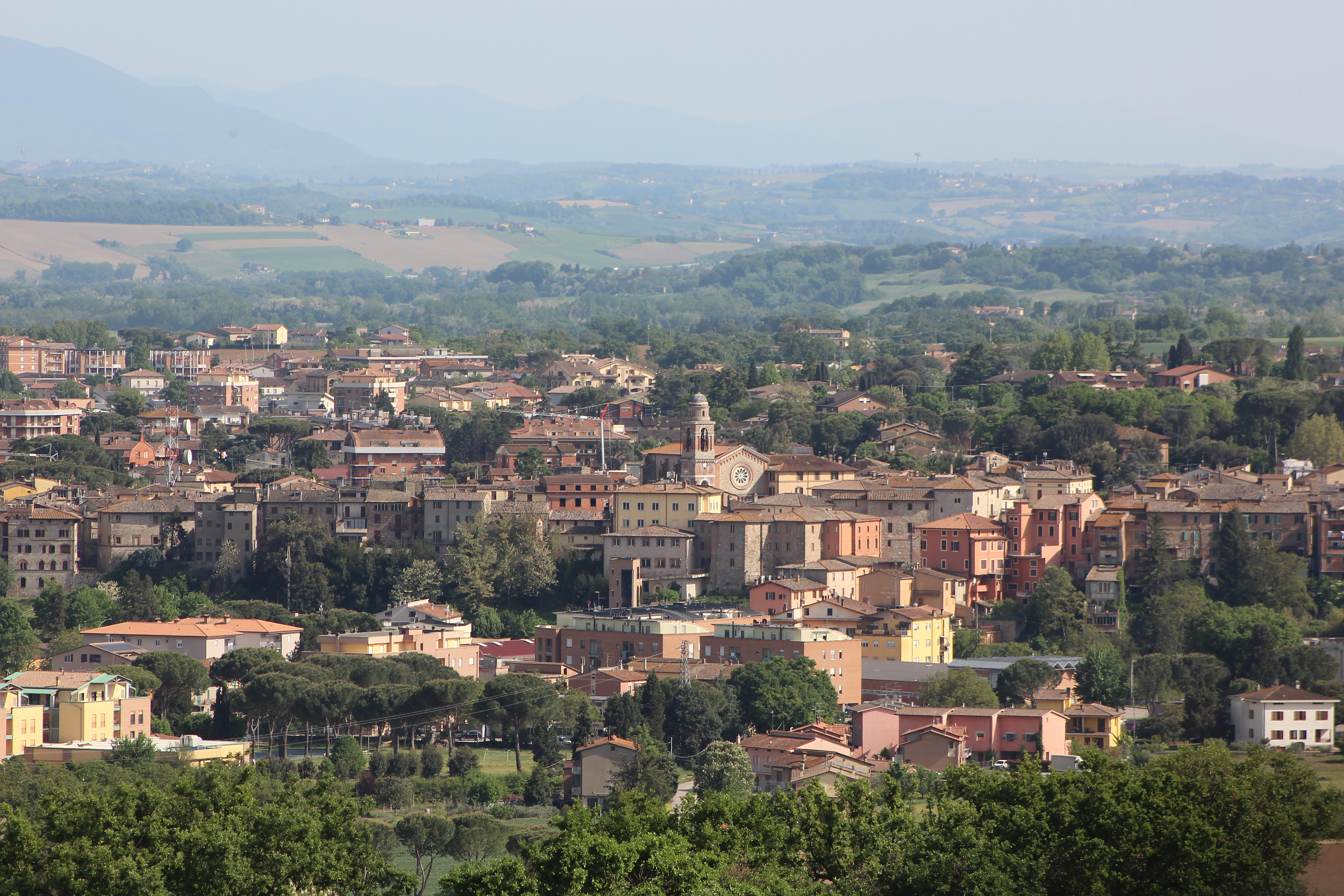
- View of Marsciano

- Location within Italy Location within Umbria
- Coordinates: 42.910771°N 12.337361°E
- Country: Italy
- Region: Umbria
- Province: Province of Perugia (PG)

Government
  - Mayor: Michele Moretti

Area
  - Total: 161.5 km^{2} (62.4 sq mi)
- Elevation: 184 m (604 ft)

Population (1 January 2025)
  - Total: 17,931
  - Density: 111.0/km^{2} (287.6/sq mi)
- Demonym: Marscianesi
- Time zone: UTC+1 (CET)
  - Summer (DST): UTC+2 (CEST)
- Postal code: 06055
- Dialing code: 075
- Patron saint: St. John the Baptist
- Website: Official website

Marsciano is a comune (municipality) in the Province of Perugia in the Italian region Umbria, located about 25 km south of Perugia.

== Etymology ==
According to 19th-century sources, the name Marsciano derives from the earlier form Mons Jani ("Mount of Janus").

== History ==
According to tradition, Marsciano was founded in 975 by the family of Bulgaro di Monreale and subsequently granted to them by the emperor Otto II. By 1075 it was a fief of the counts Bovaccini.

Marsciano is first documented in 1136, when an act of Pope Innocent II confirmed church holdings in the area. Imperial authority followed in 1163, when Frederick I confirmed the rights and lands of the church. In 1186 Henry VI granted Perugia control over the surrounding county, excluding the lands of the Bulgarello family, also known as the Marsciano.

In 1210 Cardinal Gualtiero, legate of Pope Innocent III, concluded a peace agreement between the cities of Orvieto, Todi and Perugia in Marsciano. In 1251 Pope Innocent IV confirmed to the counts of Marsciano the lordship over the castle and several important surrounding places.

The Counts Bulgarelli sold the castle to Perugia in 1281 for 5,000 pounds of denari, although some properties remained with local families. The Counts regained the town in 1296.

Between 1310 and 1312 Marsciano experienced a crisis during the Guelph–Ghibelline conflicts involving Perugia on the Guelph side and Todi and Spoleto on the Ghibelline side. The town served as a base where Perugian forces assembled. In August 1312 the emperor Henry VII encamped there, and despite existing agreements imperial troops sacked the town and its territory. Marsciano was almost entirely destroyed.

Reconstruction began in the early 14th century under Perugian direction, accompanied by repopulation. A peace agreement with Todi in 1314 ushered in a period of relative stability lasting several decades.

Papal authority over Perugia was asserted in 1346 by Pope Clement VI. A dispute over ecclesiastical patronage arose in 1352, when Bulgaro di Tiberiuccio assumed such rights, and in 1355 the town was visited by Charles IV. In 1391 a tower was built to curb unrest among the inhabitants.

Conflict resumed in the early 15th century with the campaigns of Braccio Fortebraccio. Marsciano resisted before capitulating in 1412. Attempts to recover the territory followed in 1413–1414, ending with its return to Perugia, although Braccio regained control over the region between 1416 and 1424. In the mid-15th century papal temporal authority became firmly established under Pope Martin V.

Military activity continued to affect the settlement during the 15th century, when the troops of Francesco Sforza encamped in the area and caused damage. In the early 16th century Marsciano offered refuge to members of the Baglioni family. In 1504 its inhabitants were granted Perugian citizenship.

The aftermath of the Salt War in 1540 brought papal repression and separation from Perugia, with a brief phase of self-rule, before reintegration under Perugian jurisdiction in 1558.

During the late 18th and early 19th century Marsciano functioned as a cantonal seat under Napoleonic administration. In the early 19th century it was reduced to a podestà jurisdiction and later placed under the administration of Perugia.

Before Italian unification the municipality was governed by a prior and four elders and included dependent districts. In 1860 Marsciano was annexed to the Kingdom of Italy, after which these districts became subdivisions of the municipality.

In 1895 the population of Marsciano was 11,662 inhabitants.

== Geography ==
Marsciano is located in the Tiber Valley on a small elevation. The surrounding territory is crossed by the Nestore stream and in some areas by the Tiber. The town lies 18 miles (29 km) from Perugia, 12 miles (19 km) from Todi, and 4 miles (6.4 km) from both Collepepe and Fratta Todina.

The climate is described as mild but rather humid, with winds prevailing from the east and south.

The woods of Santa Lucia and San Sisto lie about 0.5 miles (0.80 km) away.

Marsciano borders the following municipalities: Collazzone, Deruta, Fratta Todina, Perugia, Piegaro, San Venanzo, Todi.

=== Subdivisions ===
The municipality includes the localities of Badiola, Case del Colle, Castello delle Forme, Castiglione della Valle, Cerqueto, Cerro, Collebrano, Compignano, Filoncia, Marsciano, Mercatello, Migliano, Monte Vibiano Vecchio, Morcella, Olmeto, Papiano, Pieve Caina, San Biagio della Valle, San Valentino, Sant'Apollinare, Sant'Elena, Spina, Stazione, Vallicelle, Villanova.

In 2021, 3,651 people lived in rural dispersed dwellings not assigned to any named locality. At the time, most of the population lived in Marsciano proper (9,528).

== Economy ==
The local economy in the 19th century was based primarily on agriculture, with fertile land supporting livestock and the cultivation of cereals, vines and olive trees. Local production included notably well-regarded peaches. A grain mill and fulling mill operated using the waters of the Nestore.

== Religion and culture ==
=== San Giovanni Battista ===
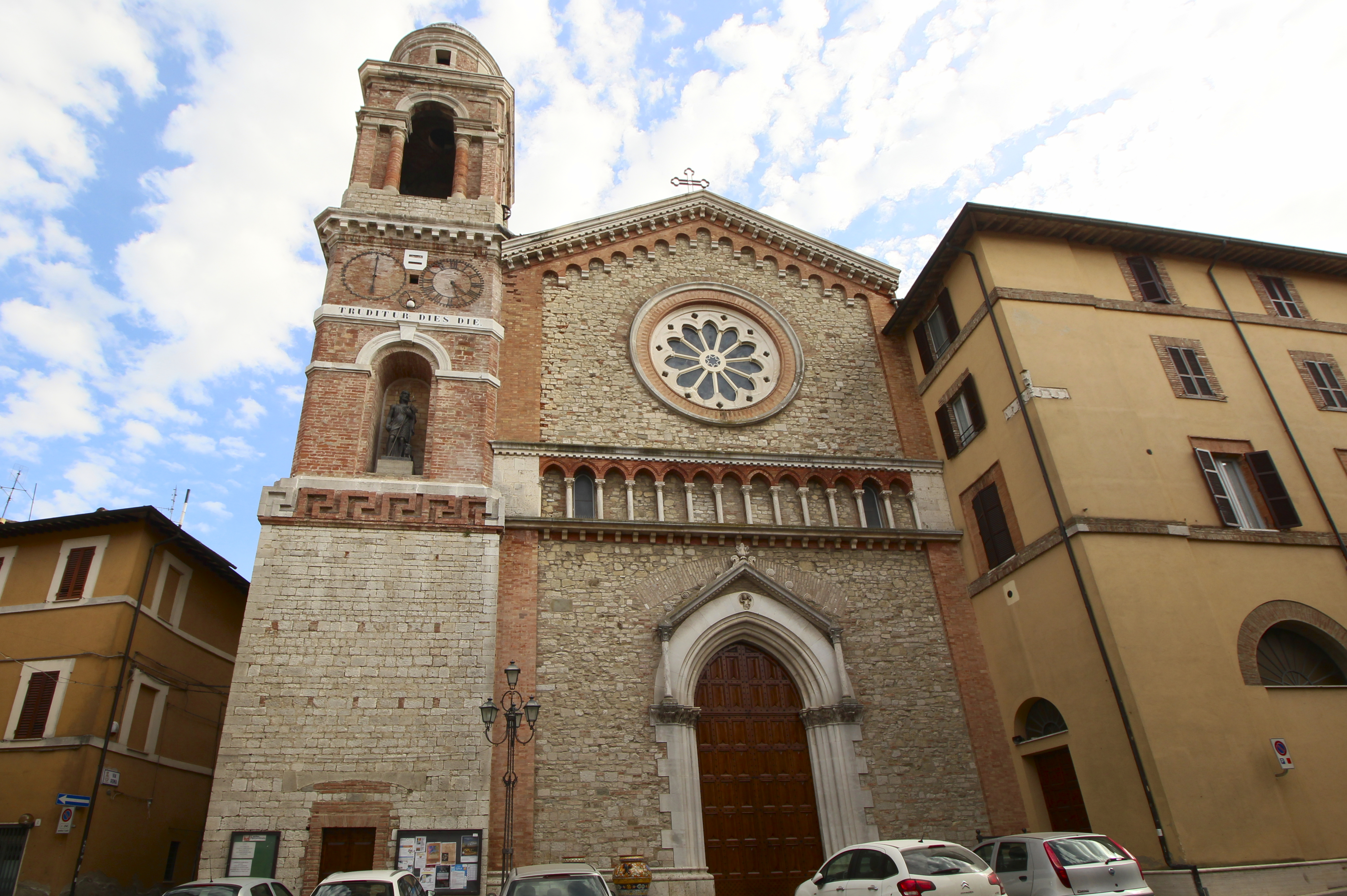
Church of San Giovanni Battista

The church of San Giovanni Battista was reconstructed around 1896 and has a masonry and brick façade with a large rose window. Inside are a Madonna and Child from the 16th century of the Perugian school, a painting dated 1831 by the painter Vincenzo Chialli depicting the Incredulity of Saint Thomas, and a wooden crucifix from the 13th century.

=== Santa Maria Assunta ===
The construction of the Church of Santa Maria Assunta dates to a period before 1163, the earliest documented date associated with the building. Inside the bell tower is a bell cast in 1394.

The principal façade is flat and has a large portal made of shaped bricks with a mosaic in the lunette from 1984. Above it is an arched window framed with brick. The church contains several works of art, including a fresco of Saint Sebastian dated 1478 on the right wall of the presbytery. The fresco is the earliest authenticated work of Pietro Perugino, and originally came from the Chapel of Mary Magdalene, which was destroyed in 1779.

=== Museum of Brick and Terracotta ===
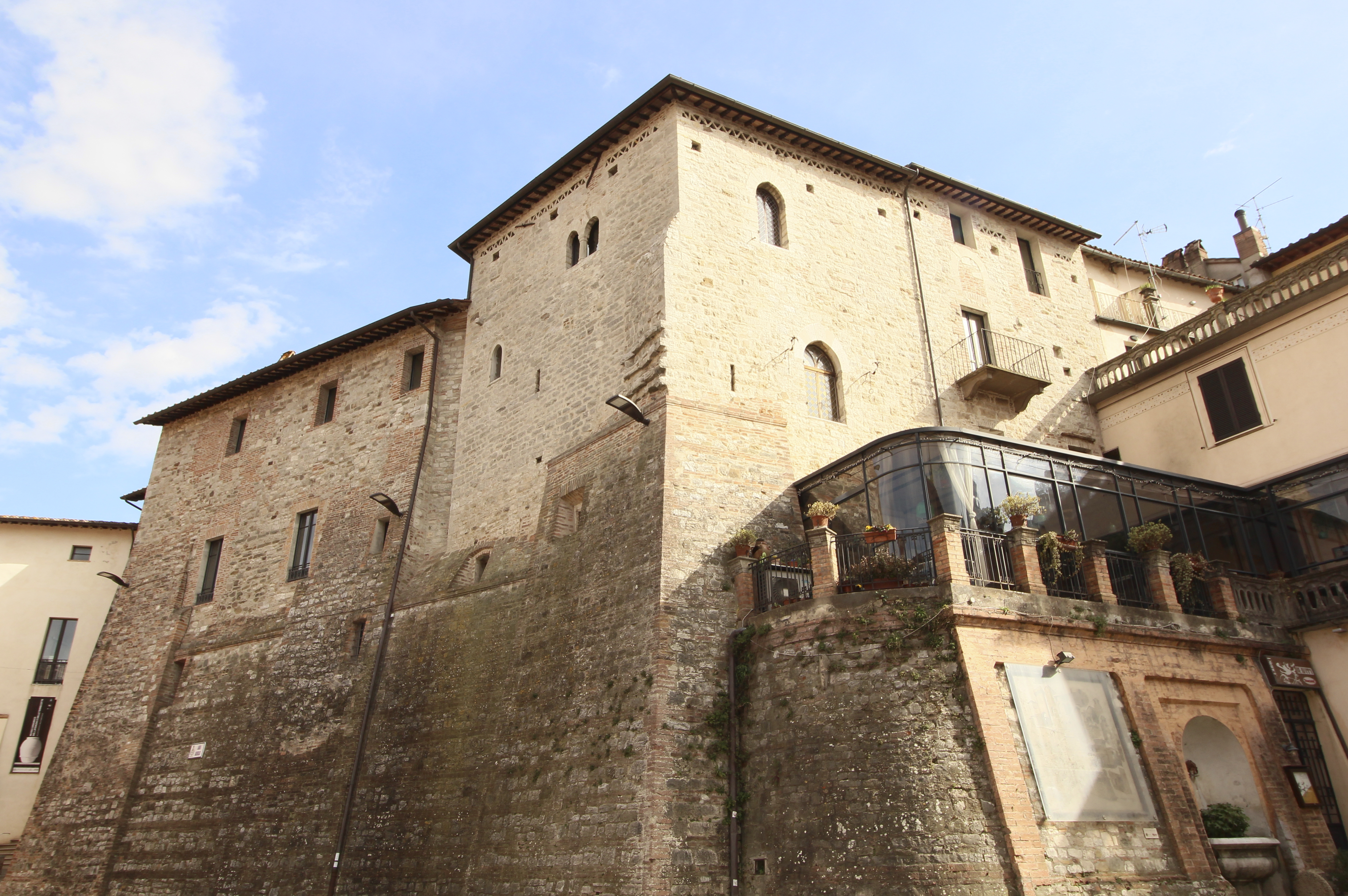
Palazzo Pietromarchi

The Museum of Brick and Terracotta is housed in Palazzo Pietromarchi, built in the 14th century by the counts Bulgarelli of Marsciano. Marsciano is noted for brick production and for buildings constructed largely of brick.

The museum serves as a starting point for a wider route including the production sites of Compignano and San Fortunato, where former kilns document preindustrial brick production, as well as exhibition centers at Compignano and Spina dedicated to local traditions. Since 2004 the rooms of Palazzo Pietromarchi have displayed bricks, roof tiles and other building materials, together with decorative and utilitarian terracottas produced in the area from the Roman period to the present. Some rooms contain permanent exhibitions, including those dedicated to the Marsciano artist Antonio Ranocchia and to terracotta whistles.

=== Teatro Concordia ===
The Teatro Concordia was built in 1873 by the Società Della Concordia, which had been established to provide public and private moral entertainments and educational activities. The project was designed by Nazareno Biscarini. The brick façade is the only surviving element of the original structure.

== Notable people ==
The town was associated with the Counts of Marsciano, whose history was published in 1667 by Ferdinando Ughelli. The same family included the Blessed Angeline of Marsciano.

Among the principal families recorded in the 19th century are the Counts Massei, the Massini, the Nerucci, and the Moneta.

=== List of people ===
- Giancarlo Antognoni, former footballer, world champion with Italy national football team in 1982.
- Monia Baccaille, road cyclist.
- Marco Bocci, actor.
- Trebonianus Gallus, Roman emperor from 251 to 253.
- Simone Mortaro, Italian footballer.
- Walter Sabatini, former footballer and coach.
- Luigi Salvatorelli, historian and journalist.
- Francesco Satolli, cardinal of the catholic church.

== Twin towns and sister cities ==
Marsciano is twinned with:

- Tremblay-en-France, France, since 1982
- Orosei, Italy, since 1985
- Loropéni, Burkina Faso, since 1987
- Jablonec nad Nisou, Czech Republic, since 1998
