= Tricca (disambiguation) =

Tricca is a city of ancient Thessaly, Greece.

Tricca may also refer to:

- Angiolo Tricca (1817-1884), Italian caricaturist and painter
- Fosco Tricca (1856-1918), Italian painter
- Michele Tricca (born 1993), Italian sprinter
- Tricca, a synonym for a genus of wolf spiders.
