= Francesco Satolli =

Italian cardinal (1839–1910)

His Eminence Francesco Satolli
- Prefect of the Congregation for Studies
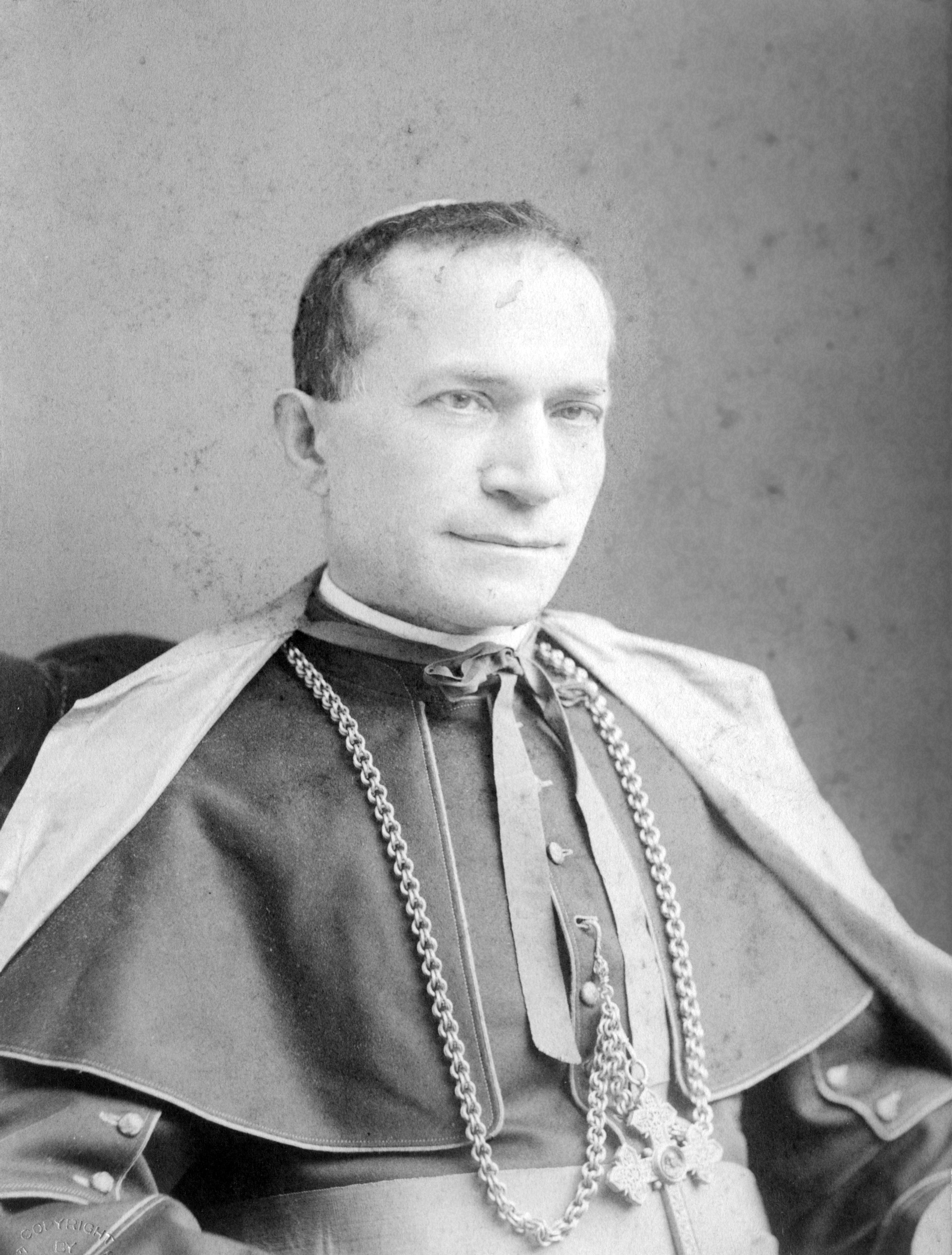
- Church: Catholic Church
- Appointed: 21 July 1897
- Term ended: 8 January 1910
- Predecessor: Beniamino Cavicchioni
- Successor: Benedetto Lorenzelli
- Other post: Archpriest of the Archbasilica of Saint John Lateran (1896–1910)
- Previous post: Apostolic Delegate to the United States (1893–1896)

Orders
- Ordination: 14 June 1862 by Gioacchino Pecci
- Consecration: 10 June 1888 by Raffaele Monaco La Valletta
- Created cardinal: 29 November 1895 by Pope Leo XIII
- Rank: Cardinal-Priest (1896–1903); Cardinal-Bishop (1903–1910)

Personal details
- Born: July 21, 1839 Marsciano, Papal States
- Died: January 8, 1910 (aged 70) Rome, Italy

Francesco di Paolo Satolli (21 July 1839 – 8 January 1910) was an Italian prelate of the Catholic Church. He served as the first Apostolic Delegate to the United States from 1893 to 1896 and as Prefect of the Congregation for Studies from 1897 until his death in 1910. He was created a cardinal by Pope Leo XIII in 1895.

== Early life and career ==
Francesco di Paolo Satolli was born on 21 July 1839 in Marsciano, near Perugia, then part of the Papal States. He was the son of Giovanni Battista and Maria (née Calzini) Satolli. In his later life, there were rumors that Satolli was the illegitimate son of Pope Leo XIII.

In 1853, Satolli entered the seminary of Perugia, where he was taught literature by his own brother and philosophy by Father Giuseppe Pecci. He was ordained a priest on 14 June 1862 by Cardinal Gioacchino Pecci, the Bishop of Perugia and future Pope Leo XIII.

Following his ordination, Satolli furthered his studies at the Sapienza University of Rome, where he earned a doctorate in philosophy. In 1864, he was appointed to the faculty of the Perugia seminary, teaching letters and philosophy. From 1870 to 1875, he taught at the Benedictine monastery of Monte Cassino. Satolli then served as pastor in his native Marsciano from 1875 to 1880. In addition to his pastoral duties, he became involved in Cardinal Pecci's efforts to revive Thomism, the theological system of Thomas Aquinas, becoming a member and later the director of the Academy of St. Thomas in Perugia. The academy held monthly meetings that featured lectures and discussions on Thomism, and Satolli emerged as one of the leading Thomists in Italy.

In 1880, two years after Cardinal Pecci was elected pope in the 1878 conclave, he appointed Satolli to replace Dom Bernard Smith as professor of dogmatic theology at the Pontificio Collegio Urbano de Propaganda Fide in Rome, which trained foreign missionaries. He held this position until 1892, and continued to implement the neo-scholasticism movement. He also taught at the Pontifical Roman Major Seminary and served as rector of the Pontifical Greek College (1884–1886) and the Pontifical Ecclesiastical Academy (1886–1888).

On 1 June 1888, Satolli was appointed to the honorary position of Titular Archbishop of Nafpaktos by Leo XIII. He received his episcopal consecration on the following 10 June from Cardinal Raffaele Monaco La Valletta, with Archbishop Elia Bianchi and Bishop Raffaele Sirolli serving as co-consecrators.

== Apostolic Delegate to the United States ==
=== Background ===
By the late 19th century, the Catholic Church in the United States was facing several controversies which attracted the attention of the Holy See. Many bishops were involved in conflicts with their priests, who sent appeals to Rome. One of the most prominent cases was that of Archbishop Michael Corrigan and Father Edward McGlynn, whom Corrigan excommunicated in 1887 due to his views on private property. The American bishops were also divided over Archbishop John Ireland's outspoken support for the Faribault–Stillwater plan, a system in which a public school district would control parochial schools during school hours while religious instruction occurred outside those hours. Ireland's opponents, including Corrigan, believed that such a system undermined Catholic education.

For some years, the Holy See considered appointing a papal representative to the United States to settle these disputes. However, the majority of American bishops were opposed to such an action. Some worried that a papal representative would weaken their episcopal authority; others feared that it would exacerbate anti-Catholicism in the United States, just as the 1853 visit of Archbishop Gaetano Bedini had led to riots. In the absence of a papal representative, the archbishop of Baltimore, as the leader of the oldest American diocese, often served as an intermediary between the Holy See and American bishops.

=== Early activities ===
An anti-Catholic cartoon highlights the Satolli appointment.

In 1889, Leo XIII sent Satolli to the United States to attend the centennial celebration of the American Church and the opening of the Catholic University of America. Upon his return to Rome, Satolli recommended to the pope that he establish a more direct means of communication with the American bishops.

The establishment of an apostolic delegate was strongly supported by Archbishop Ireland, who hoped to win papal approval of the Faribault–Stillwater plan. An opportunity to install a delegate without arousing the opposition of the other American bishops presented itself with the World's Columbian Exposition, whose dedication ceremonies were scheduled for October 1892. Ireland was actively involved in the preparations for the exposition, and suggested that the pope be invited to send a representative as an exhibitor. U.S. Secretary of State John W. Foster then wrote to Cardinal Mariano Rampolla, the Vatican Secretary of State, requesting the loan of 15th century maps from the Vatican Library to display at the exposition. The Holy See agreed and appointed Satolli to bring the maps to the United States.

According to Denis J. O'Connell and John Murphy Farley, while the delivery of the maps was the official reason for his visit, Satolli was secretly commissioned by Leo XIII to stay in the United States for two years to resolve the school debate and restore the status of Father McGlynn. After attending the exposition's dedication ceremonies in Chicago, Satolli stayed with Archbishop Ireland in Saint Paul, Minnesota, until November 1892, when he attended a meeting of the American archbishops in New York City. On the first day of the meeting, Satolli presented 14 propositions on the school issue that largely reflected Ireland's views, expressing support for parochial schools while allowing Catholic children to attend public schools. When all the archbishops except Ireland refused to sign the document even after edits were made, Satolli stormed out of the room. At the same meeting, Satolli also asked the archbishops for their opinion on establishing an apostolic delegate; again, all but Ireland refused to commit until they discussed the matter with their suffragan bishops.

In December 1892, Satolli received faculties from the Holy See to settle disputes between American bishops and their priests. When news of his new faculties reached the press, The New York Times wrote that "such autocratic power...would practically make [Satolli] the Pope of America." He subsequently held a meeting with Father McGlynn, who submitted a letter explaining his beliefs on private property and expressing his support for Leo XIII's Rerum novarum. Satolli had the letter examined by four professors at the Catholic University, who found nothing objectionable in it. As a result, Satolli lifted Archbishop Corrigan's excommunication against McGlynn.

=== Appointment ===
On 14 January 1893, Leo XIII officially established the Apostolic Delegation in the United States and named Satolli as the first delegate. While he initially resided on the campus of the Catholic University, he later purchased a house on I Street in Washington, D.C., that previously belonged to Stephen A. Douglas and Joseph P. Bradley.

Despite his appointment by the pope, Satolli was met with opposition in the United States and beyond. His support for the Faribault–Stillwater plan and Father McGlynn angered Archbishop Corrigan, a leader of the conservative American bishops. The mutual dislike between Satolli and Corrigan eventually became so intense that Cardinal Rampolla instructed Cardinal James Gibbons in June 1893 to arrange a peacemaking meeting with the two men. Leo XIII addressed some American criticism of Satolli in his 1895 encyclical Longinqua, writing, "But how unjust and baseless would be the suspicion, should it anywhere exist, that the powers conferred on the legate are an obstacle to the authority of the bishops!" Furthermore, Satolli was also opposed in Rome by the Congregation for the Propagation of the Faith, which then oversaw the affairs of the American Church but had not been consulted on Satolli's appointment. The congregation disliked Satolli's tendency to deal directly with the pope and allegedly attempted to recall him.

Despite his early alliance with liberal-minded American bishops, Satolli eventually became more aligned with conservatives. Bishop John J. Keane, rector of the Catholic University, reported that Satolli "[looked] askance" at Keane's participation in the 1893 Parliament of the World's Religions. When Cardinal Gibbons and Archbishop Ireland refused to publish Leo XIII's decree forbidding Catholic membership in secret societies, Satolli described the move as an act of "insubordination." His break with the liberal faction became more public at an event in Pottsville, Pennsylvania, in April 1895, when he defended the largely conservative German-American Catholics against "false charges and accusations." By 1896, he publicly described Ireland as an "apostle of heresy." That same year, Bishop Keane was removed as rector of the Catholic University after Satolli forwarded challenges against his orthodoxy to Rome; according to the New York World, Satolli said Keane "never opened his mouth without contradicting the theological and philosophical teachings of the Church."

=== Cardinal ===
Satolli was created Cardinal-Priest of Santa Maria in Ara Coeli by Leo XIII during the consistory of 29 November 1895. He received the red biretta on 5 January 1896 from Cardinal Gibbons at the Baltimore Cathedral.

== Later life ==
Satolli returned to Rome in October 1896. On 16 December of that year, he was appointed archpriest of the Lateran Basilica. In addition to that role, he was named prefect of the Congregation for Studies on 21 July 1897. As leader of the congregation, he oversaw all Catholic universities and seminaries.

Satolli also served as a member of the Congregation for the Propagation of the Faith. As such, he continued to play an important role in the American Church by consulting on the appointment of bishops. He successfully advocated against the appointment of the liberal John Lancaster Spalding to the Archdiocese of San Francisco and for the appointment of the conservative William Henry O'Connell to the Archdiocese of Boston. However, when Father Edward Joseph Hanna was accused of Modernism, Satolli supported his former student at the Pontificio Collegio Urbano.

On 22 June 1903, a month before his death, Leo XIII elevated Satolli to the rank of Cardinal-Bishop and assigned him to the suburbicarian see of Frascati. He later participated in the 1903 conclave that elected Pope Pius X.

Satolli died in Rome on 8 January 1910, at the age of 70. His Requiem Mass was celebrated on 12 January at the Lateran Basilica, where Pius X suspended the normal regulation that allows the funerals of only deceased popes at the basilica. His body was then taken by train to his native Marsciano, where he was buried at the church of San Giovanni Battista.

== Sources ==
- Fogarty, Gerald P. (1974). The Vatican and the Americanist Crisis: Denis J. O'Connell, American Agent in Rome, 1885-1903. Gregorian & Biblical Press. ISBN 9788876524578.
- Ellis, John Tracy (1952). The Life of James Cardinal Gibbons. Vol. 1. Milwaukee: Bruce Publishing Company.
- Curran, Robert Emmett (1978). Michael Augustine Corrigan and the Shaping of Conservative Catholicism in America, 1878–1902. New York: Arno Press.
- Ahern, Patrick Henry (1955). The Life of John J. Keane: Educator and Archbishop, 1839-1918. Milwaukee: Bruce Publishing Company.

Catholic Church titles
Preceded by Office established	Apostolic Delegate to the United States; 1893–1896	Succeeded by Sebastiano Martinelli
