= Luigi Salvatorelli =

Italian politician (1886–1974)

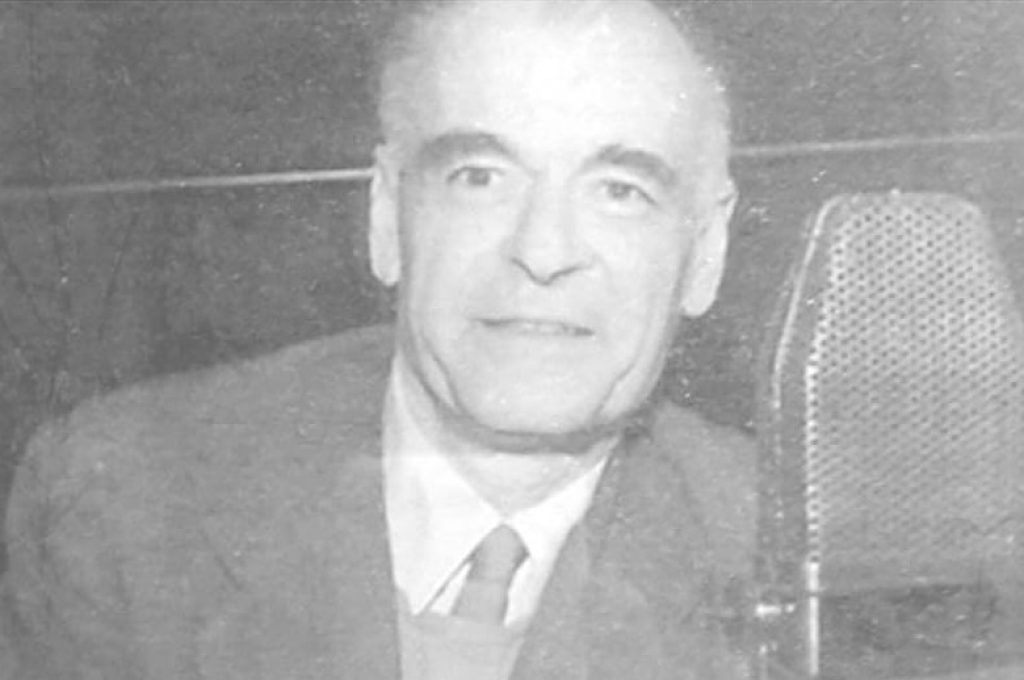
Luigi Salvatorelli

Luigi Salvatorelli (11 March 1886 – 3 November 1974) was an Italian historian and publicist, born in Marsciano, Province of Perugia, Italy and a political journalist in 1919 during Benito Mussolini's rise to power and was associated with the Turin-based liberal newspaper La Stampa in 1921. He stopped writing when Mussolini abolished the freedom of the press and Salvatorelli later became a member of the liberal socialist Action Party (Partito d'Azione, PdA). His work Storia d'Italia nel periodo fascista (History of Italy in the Fascist Period, co-written with Giovanni Mira) is still to this day, with its 1,100 pages, one of the most detailed historiography monographs about the 1919–1945 period in Italy.
