= Compignano =

- Frazione
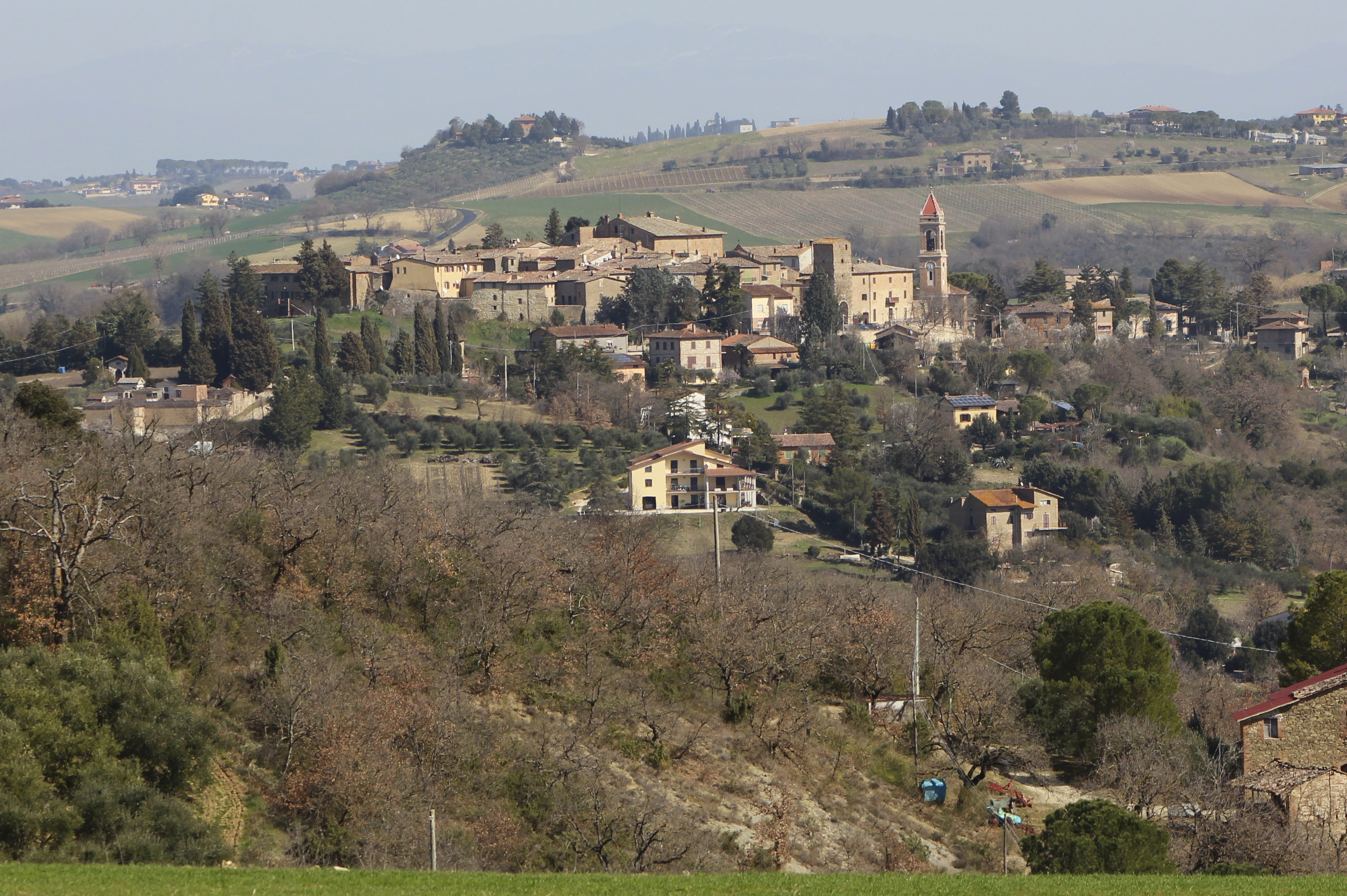
- Panorama of Compignano

- Location within Italy
- Coordinates: 42°56′54″N 12°16′48″E
- Country: Italy
- Region: Umbria
- Province: Perugia
- Comune: Marsciano
- Elevation: 262 m (860 ft)

Population (2001)
  - Total: 177
- Time zone: UTC+1 (CET)
  - Summer (DST): UTC+2 (CEST)
- Postcode: 06055
- Area code: 0575

Compignano is a village in Italy. It has 175 inhabitants according to the 2001 ISTAT data, who are known as compignanesi. Though a more recent estimate puts the population closer to 177. It is a frazione of the comune of Marsciano, a larger town 12 km away, along strada statale 317 then provinciale 340 to Spina. Compignano is on top of a low (262m) hill, overlooking the valley of the river Nestore, which runs in a wide horseshoe-shaped curve at the foot of the hill.

== History ==
Its name probably comes from Campo di Giano. The first appearance of the village in the historical record dates to 1240, where it is mentioned as the castle of the former podestà of Florence Andrea did Giacomo, with Perugia as his and its overlord. The village was sacked by the troops of Henry VII, Holy Roman Emperor in 1312. In 1361 it tried to secede from the signoria of Perugia but in 1398 the castle was returned to Perugian control, passing to count Federico di Bernardino di Marsciano (also subject to Perugia) in 1440.

In 1631 work began in the village on the construction of a palazzo for Benedetto Monaldi Baldeschi, bishop of Perugia, who visited the castle in 1637 and 1641 after his promotion to cardinal.

== Economy ==
In the past it was known for its carpentry, construction of floats, blacksmiths, coopers, and hand-weaving. It has had several generations of furnaces, with a small museum dedicated to them in the village (Museo del Laterizio e delle Terrecotte) and a restored historical brick-furnace.

== Monuments ==
- Castle - 13th century, with well-preserved circular walls and curtain walls. The entry gate, on Piazza della Vittoria, is surmounted by a stone tower (rebuilt in the first half of the 16th century), the only survivor of the original five towers. In 1925 the village's campanile was built on the remains of one of the other towers.
- Palazzo Monaldi - Corneli (17th century);
- Church of S. Cristoforo (13th century), in front of palazzo Monaldi. Around the end of the 18th century, it was almost wholly rebuilt, with a vaulted roof, five altars and paintings by Anton Maria Garbi. It was rebuilt again quite faithfully in 1905. Inside hangs a 17th-century painting of Saint Christopher.
- Chiesa della Madonna del Crocifisso (late 16th century), a small church made of bricks. Inside are frescoes by the Perugian painter Gerardo Dottori, dating to 1921-22: a scene of the life of Jesus and two large angels
Monuments of Compignano

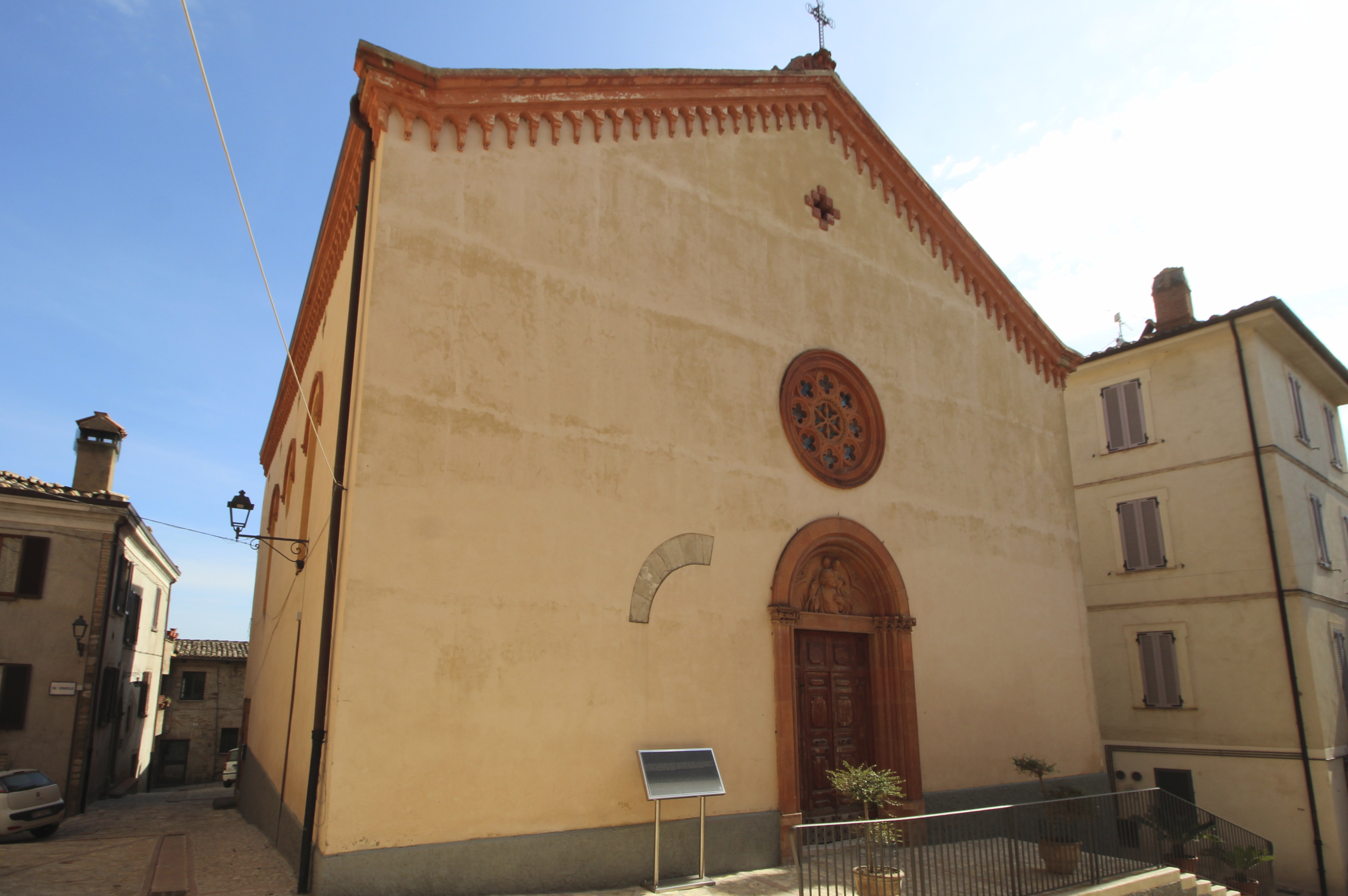
Church San Cristoforo

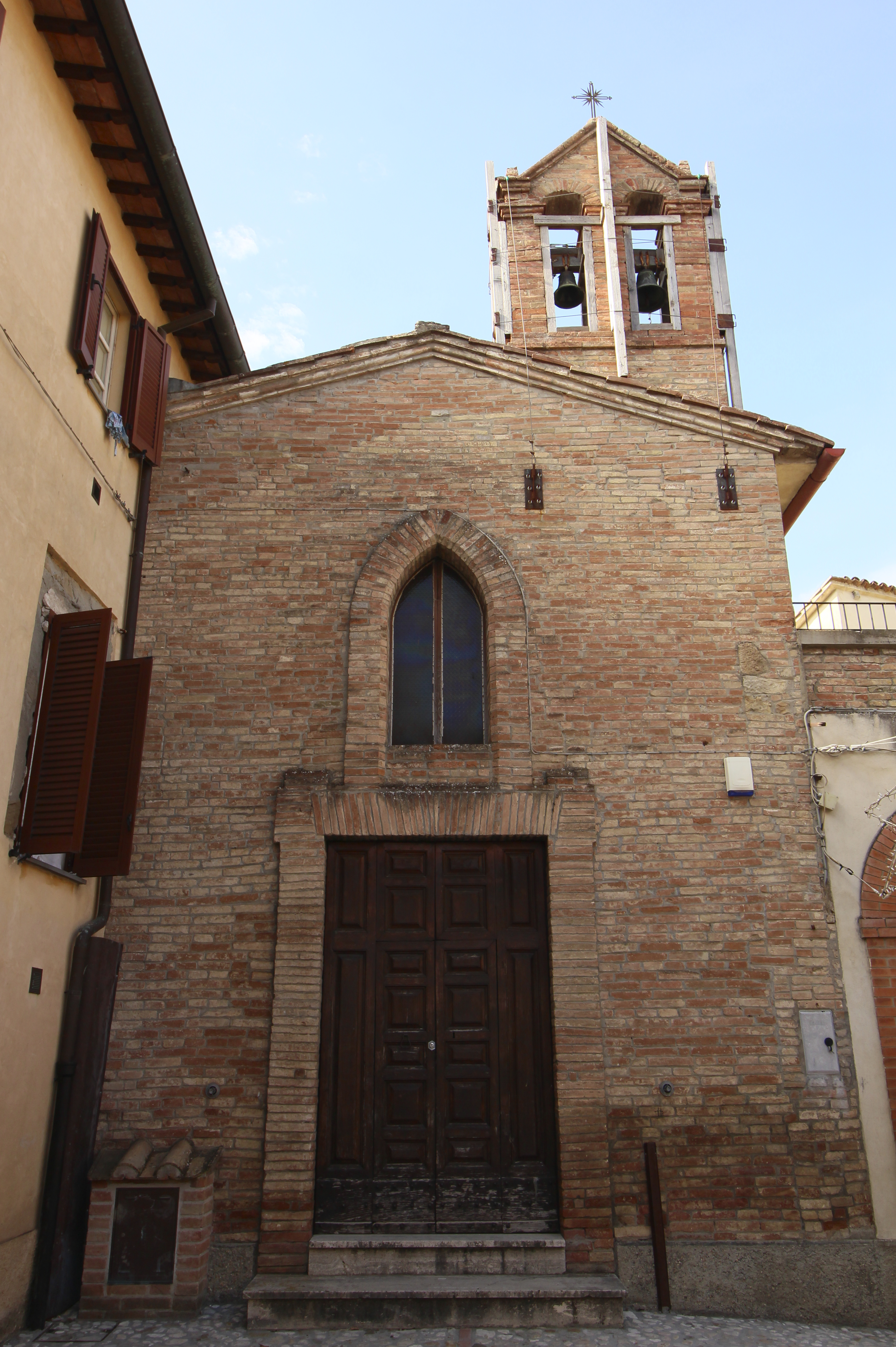
Church Santissimo Crocifisso (Madonna del Crocifisso)

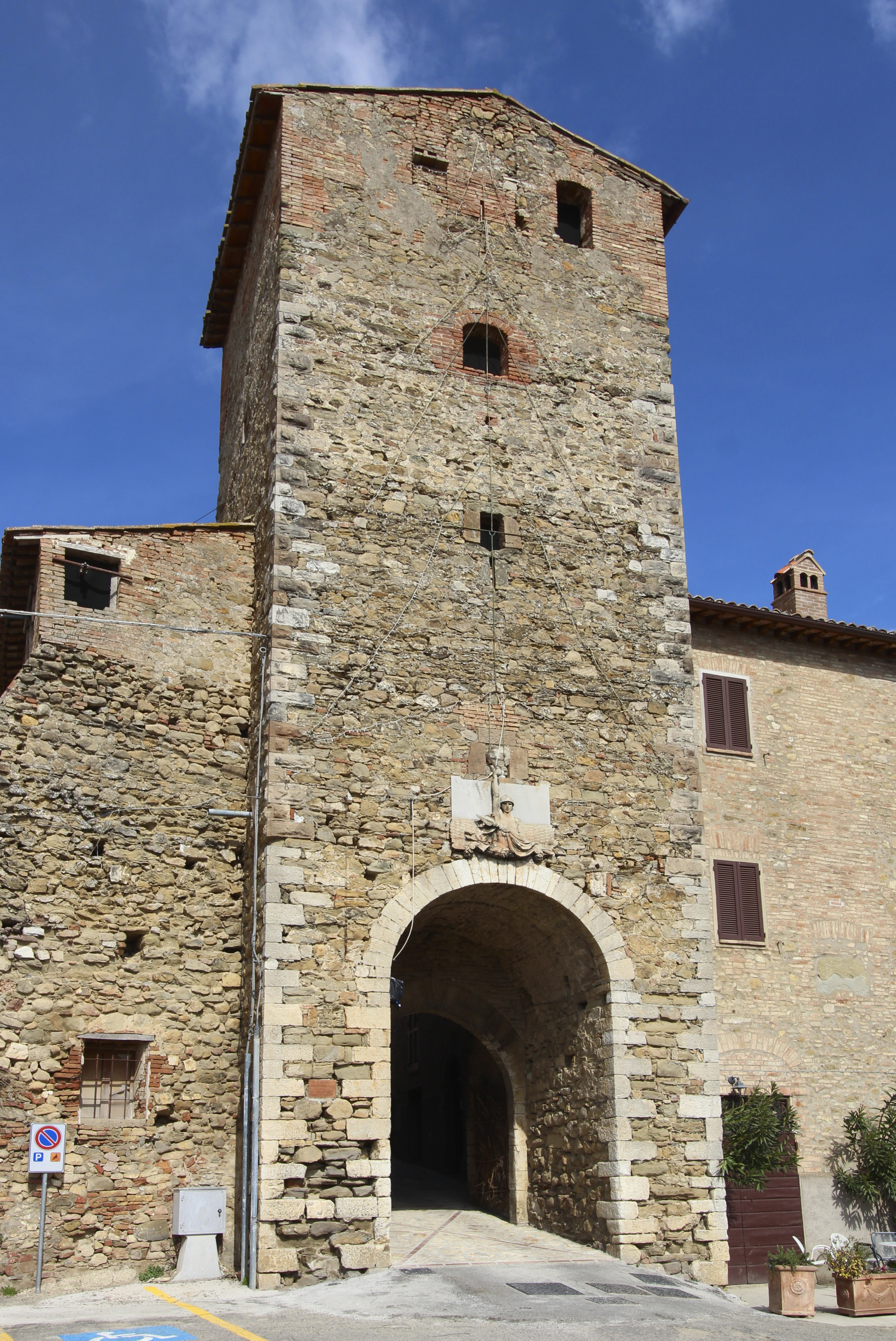
City gate of Campignano

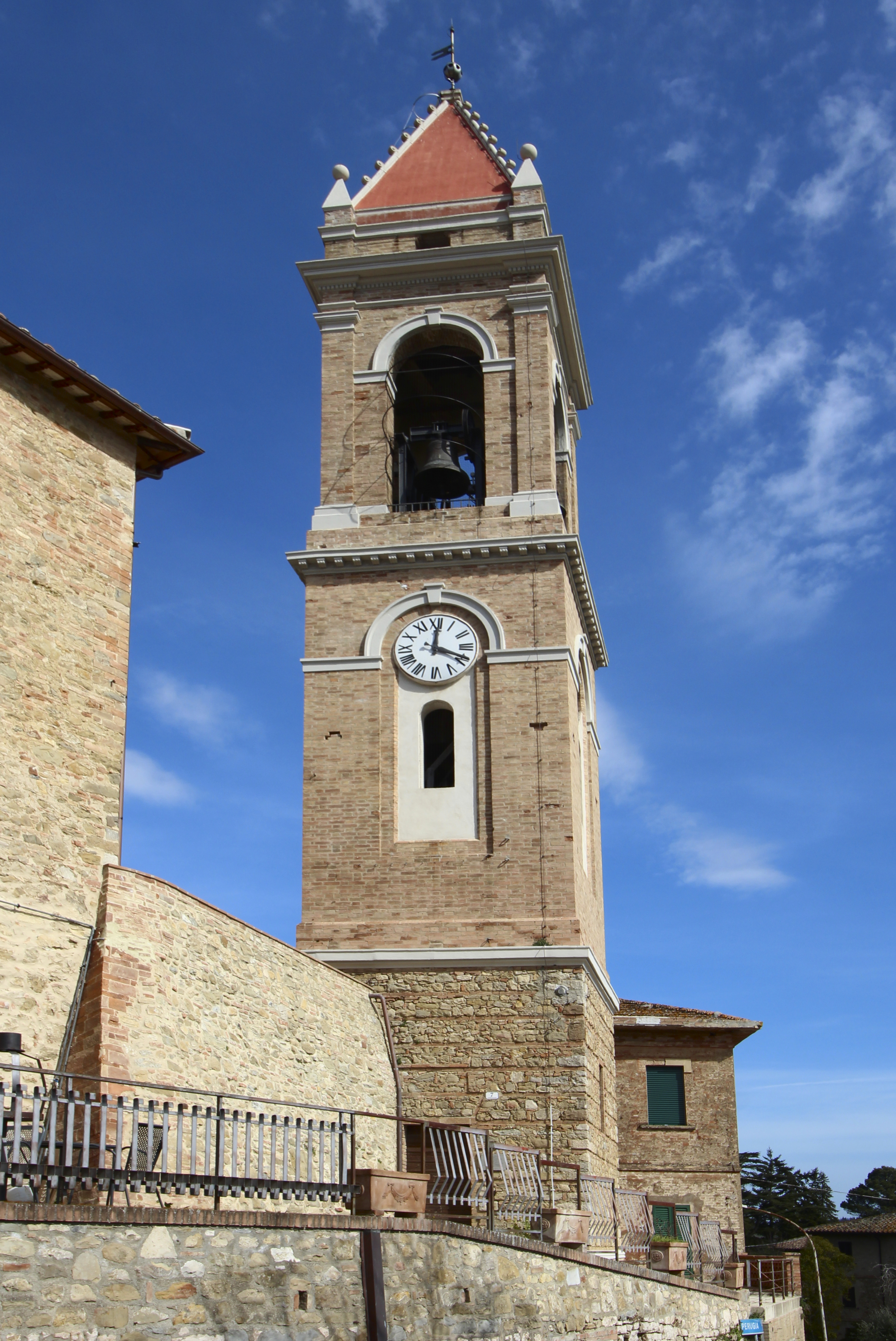
The campanile of Campignano

== Sport ==
A football field and shooting
