= Simone Mortaro =

Italian footballer

Personal information
- Full name: Simone Mortaro
- Date of birth: September 12, 1989 (age 37)
- Place of birth: Marsciano, Italy
- Position: Forward

Team information
- Current team: Sansepolcro

Senior career*
Years	Team	Apps	(Gls)
2006–2007	San Venanzo		
2007–2008	San Marino Calcio	12	(1)
2009	Real Montecchio	12	(1)
2009–2010	San Gimignano	0	(0)
- * Club domestic league appearances and goals

Simone Mortaro (born 12 September 1989 in Marsciano) is an Italian footballer who plays as a forward. He is currently playing for Sansepolcro Calcio.

== See also ==
- Football in Italy
- List of football clubs in Italy
