= San Sabino, Fratta Todina =

Church in Fratta Todina, Italy

San Sabino or San Savino is a Baroque-style, Roman Catholic church in Fratta Todina, near Todi, in Umbria, Italy.

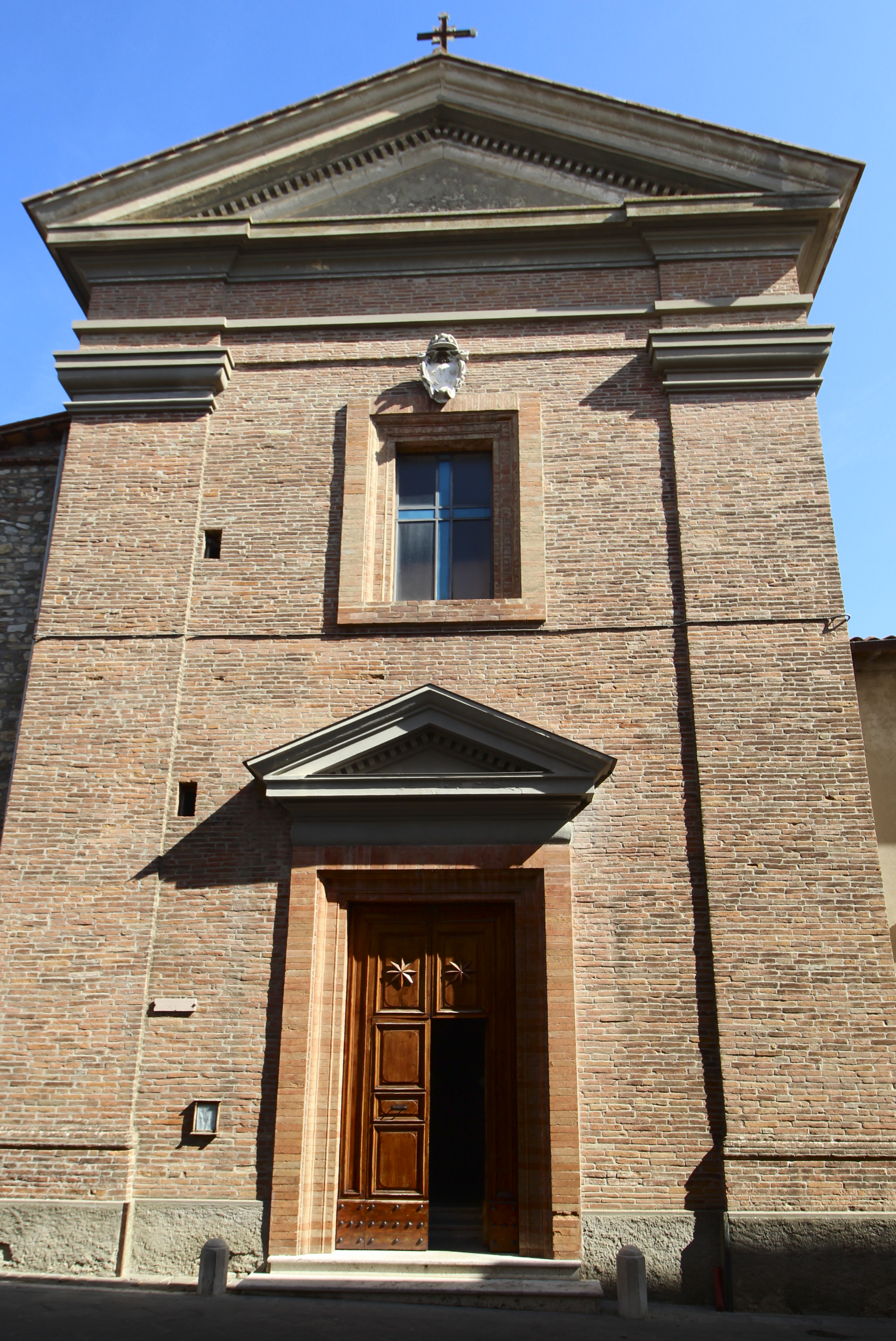
The church San Sabino, Facade

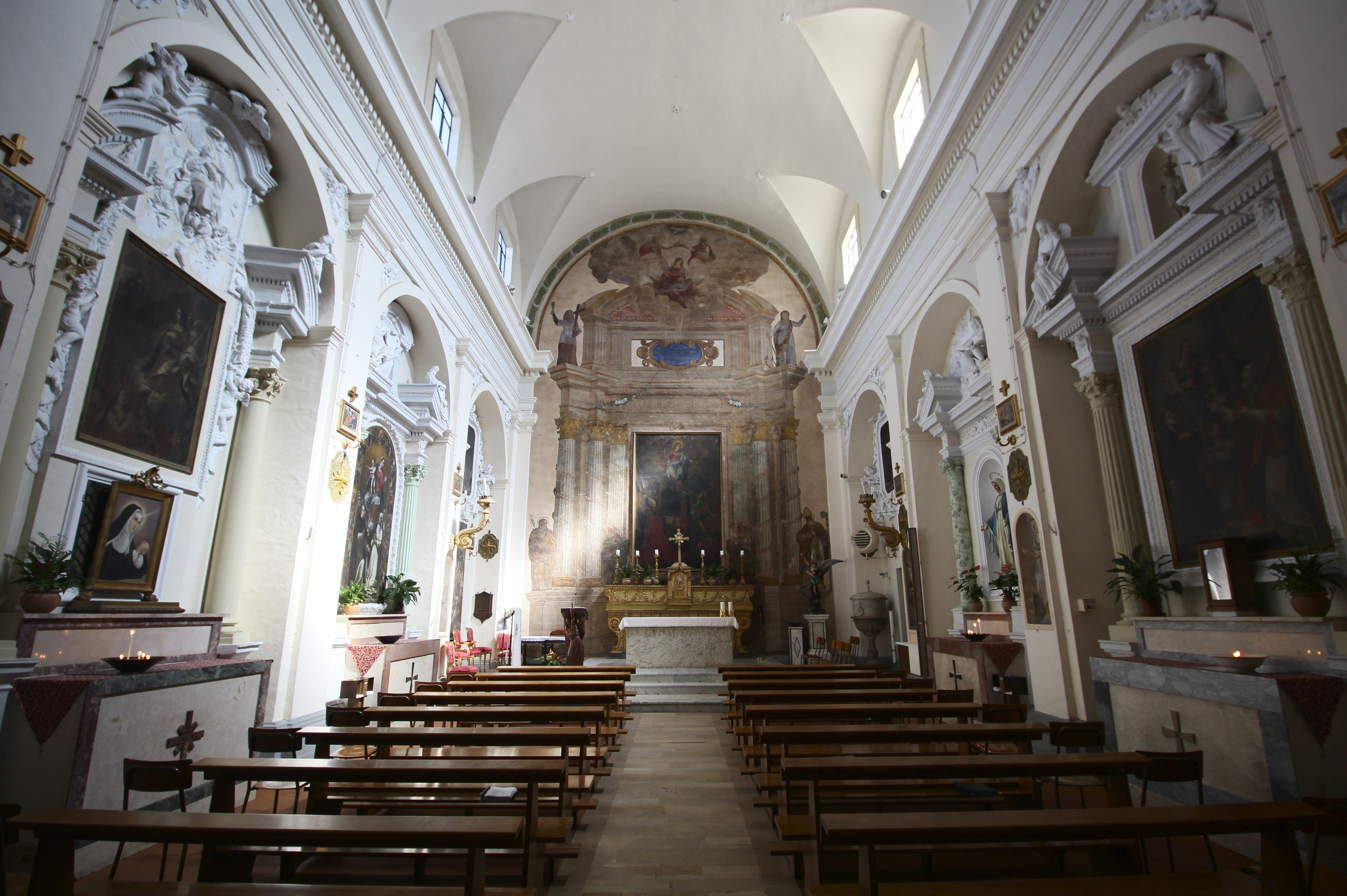
The church San Sabino, Interior

== History ==
A medieval church located at the site, by then in a ruinous state, was reconstructed in 1654 by commission of Cardinal Giovanni Battista Altieri. He employed Vittorio Onofri and Giovanni Antonio Fratini to rebuild and refurbish the church. Work was completed in three years later. Altieri's palace lies in front. The exterior is sober and simple.

== Interior ==
The interiors are rich and highly decorated.

The first chapel on the right, belonging once to the Confraternity of the Holiest Sacrament and della Misericodia has an altarpiece of the Madonna del Carmine with Saints by an unknown baroque painter. The statue of St Michael Archangel is a copy of a work by Andrea Sansovino.

The second chapel on the right has a canvas depicting the Madonna dai Sette dolori and Saints Filippo Benizzi and Cajetan of Thiene (1673) by Paolo Pietro Leoncini.

The first chapel on the left, rich in baroque decoration, was dedicated to St Ursula. This chapel has a Deposition (1612) by Andrea Polinori, which is based on a work by Federico Barocci for the Perugia Cathedral. The second altar on the left has a Madonna of the Rosary with St Dominic and St Catherine of Siena (1640) also by Polinori.

Other works the church include a copy of Andrea Sacchi’s Baptism of Christ, and a copy of Bernardino Spada's St Jerome. The altarpiece is an Madonna of the Immaculate Conception and St Peter, St Sabino, St Michael Archangel and St Paul (1665).
