= Teatro Concordia, Marsciano =

Theatre in Marsciano, Italy

Coordinates: 42°54′34″N 12°20′14″E

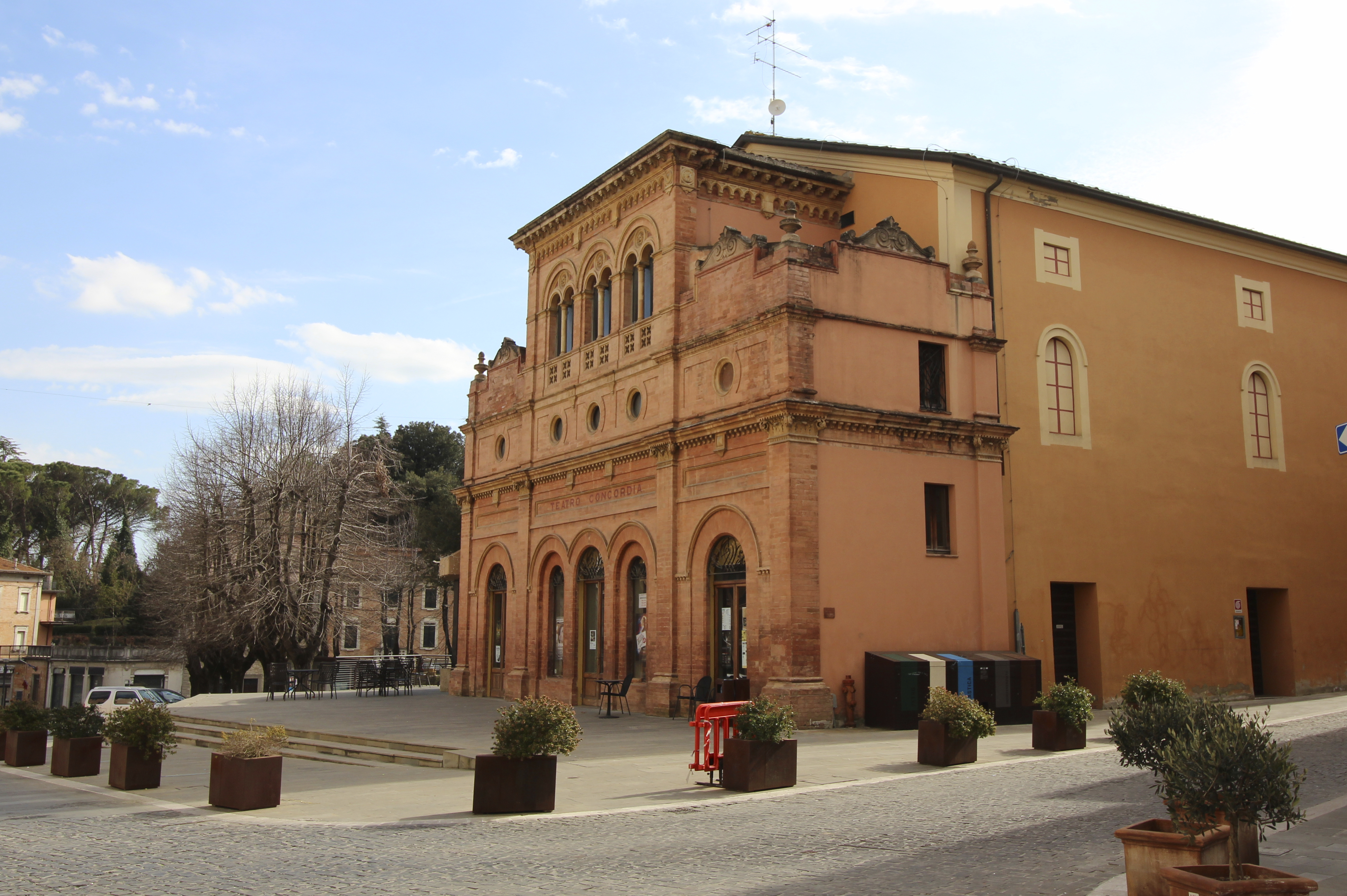
The theater

The Teatro Concordia is a film and small-stage community theater in the town of Marsciano in the province of Perugia, region of Umbria, Italy.

The seating and stage area of the theater hall itself is no longer the original 19th-century construction. Of the original structure, erected in 1873 by a private company "Della Concordia", only the eclectic brick facade remains, designed by the engineer Nazareno Biscarini with both Neo-Romanesque and Gothic Revival architectural elements. The theater itself mostly burned down in a fire during the 1950s, but the brick facade survived. In 1986–1990, the comune of Marsciano rebuilt a modern theater with 323 seats. It displays both movies and has a small stage for small performances. The front curtain was painted by Omar Galliani.
