= Collepepe =

- Frazione
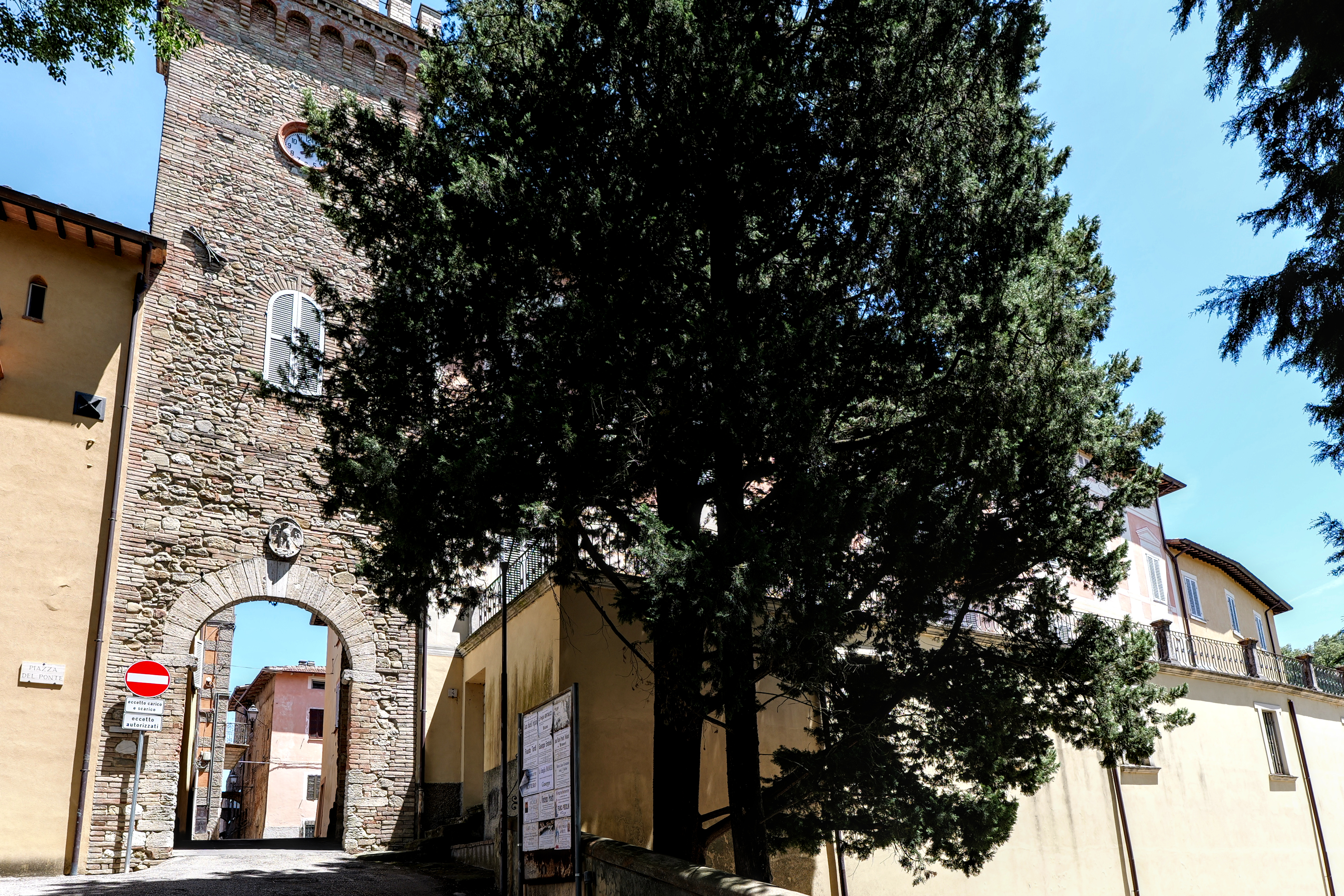
- Collepepe

- Location within Italy
- Coordinates: 42°55′07″N 12°23′48″E
- Country: Italy
- Region: Umbria
- Province: Perugia
- Comune: Collazzone
- Elevation: 251 m (823 ft)

Population (2021)
  - Total: 1,370
- Time zone: UTC+1 (CET)
  - Summer (DST): UTC+2 (CEST)
- Postcode: 06050
- Dialing code: 075

Collepepe is a frazione of the comune of Collazzone in the Province of Perugia, Umbria, central Italy. It stands at an elevation of 251 metres (823 ft) above sea level. At the time of the Istat census of 2021 it had 1,370 inhabitants.

== Geography ==
Collepepe is enclosed by walls and stands at the end of a hill overlooking the Tiber at a distance of about 1/3 mile (0.54 km). It lies near the road between Todi and Perugia.

== Economy ==
In the mid-19th century agriculture was described as very active, and the plain divided by the Tiber yielded grain, legumes, acorns, livestock and construction timber, which was transported along the river to Rome. Collepepe was regarded as the wealthiest village in the municipality of Collazzone, together with Piedicolle.

== Religion and culture ==
The abbey church of San Pancrazio contains five altars, and in the high altar was a Madonna attributed to Perugino. Above Collepepe, on a hill, stands the convent of the Capuchin Fathers.

The historic old town is located inside city walls. It contains the Romanesque-Gothic stone church of Santa Maria Assunta.
