= Casalalta =

- Frazione
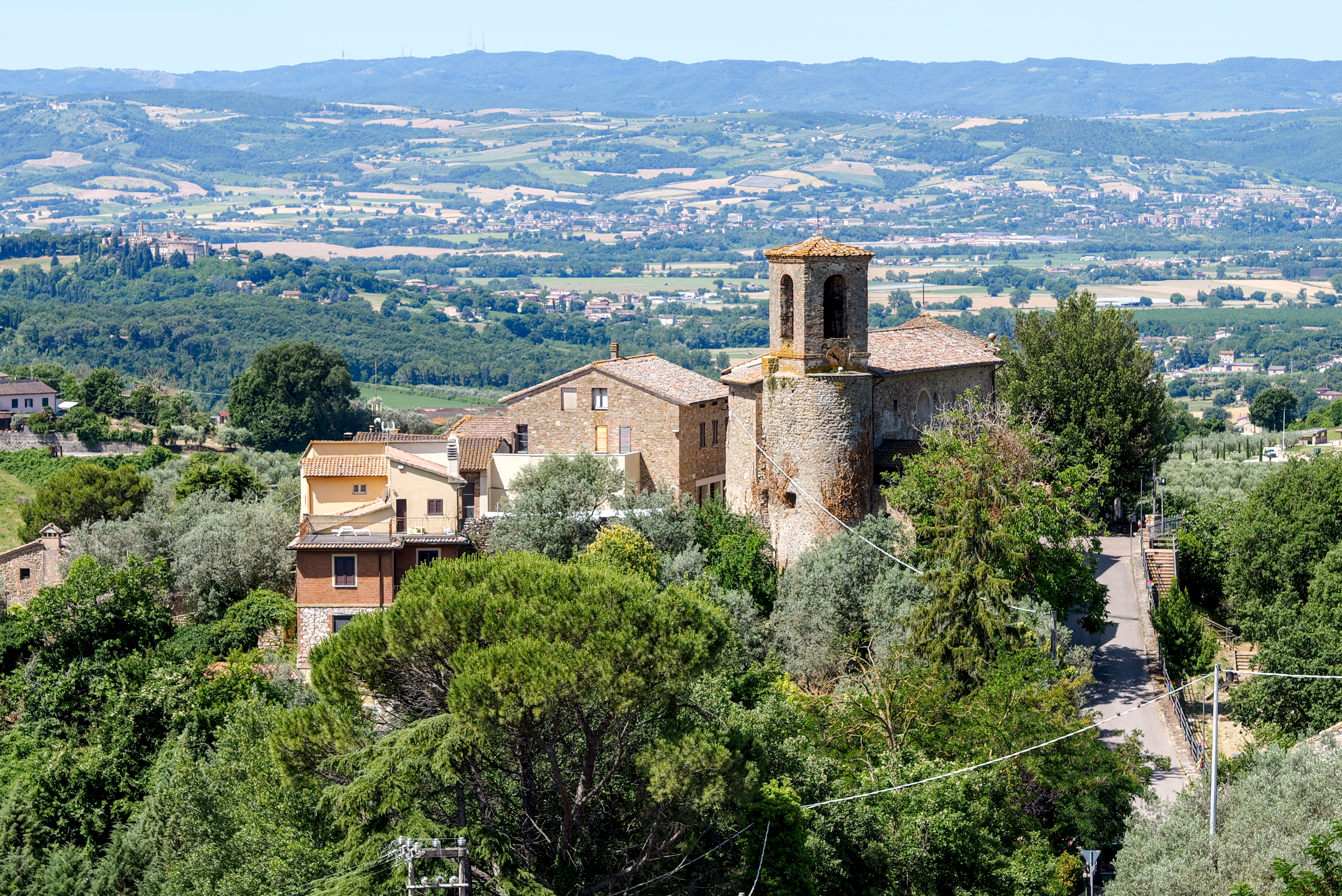
- View of Casalalta

- Location within Italy
- Coordinates: 42°56′48″N 12°26′18″E
- Country: Italy
- Region: Umbria
- Province: Perugia
- Comune: Collazzone
- Elevation: 325 m (1,066 ft)

Population (2001)
  - Total: 60
- Time zone: UTC+1 (CET)
  - Summer (DST): UTC+2 (CEST)
- Postcode: 06050
- Dialing code: 075

Casalalta is a frazione of the comune of Collazzone in the Province of Perugia, Umbria, central Italy. It stands at an elevation of 325 metres above sea level. At the time of the Istat census of 2001 it had 60 inhabitants.

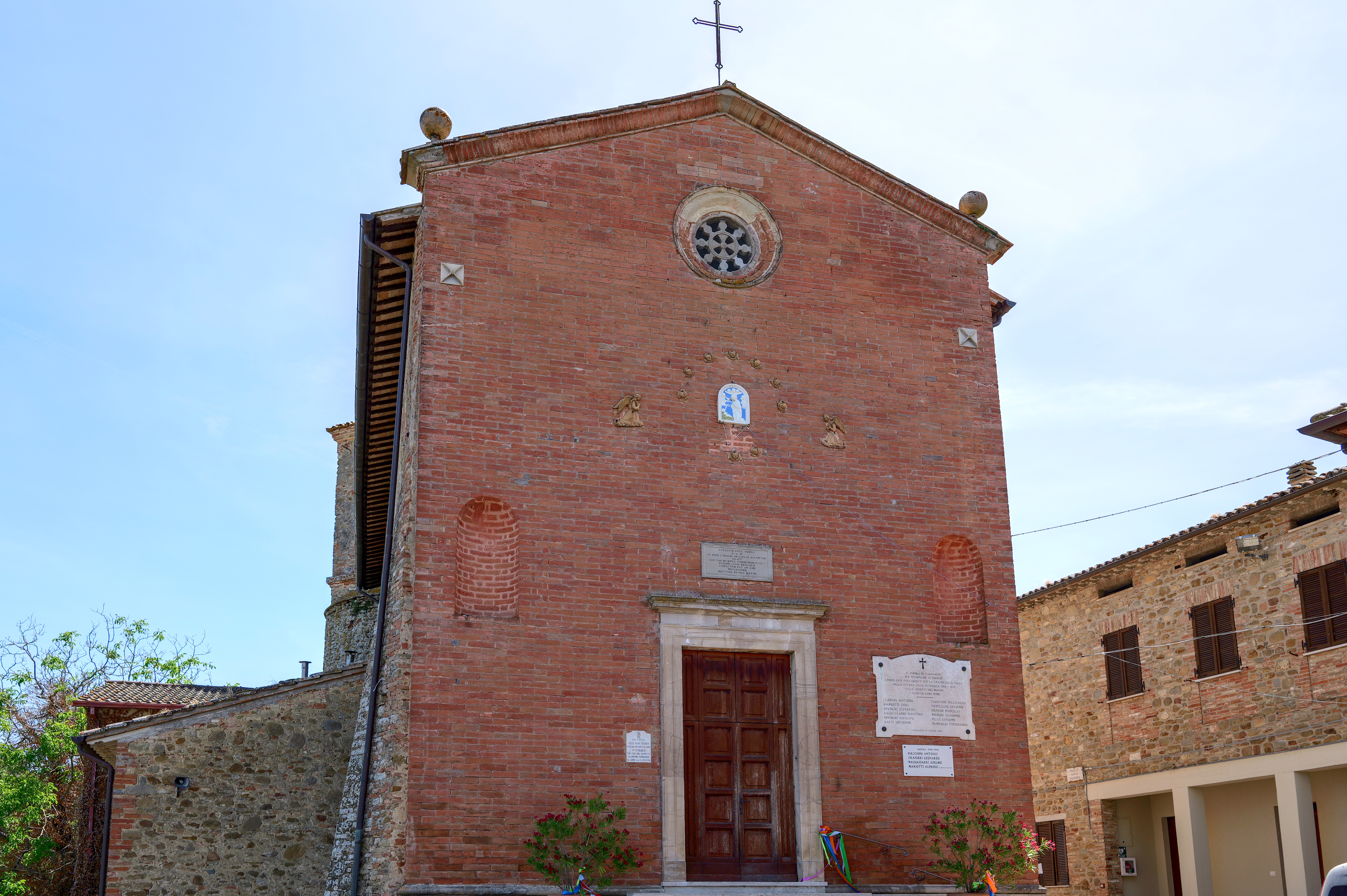
The church of Santa Maria Assunta on the castle

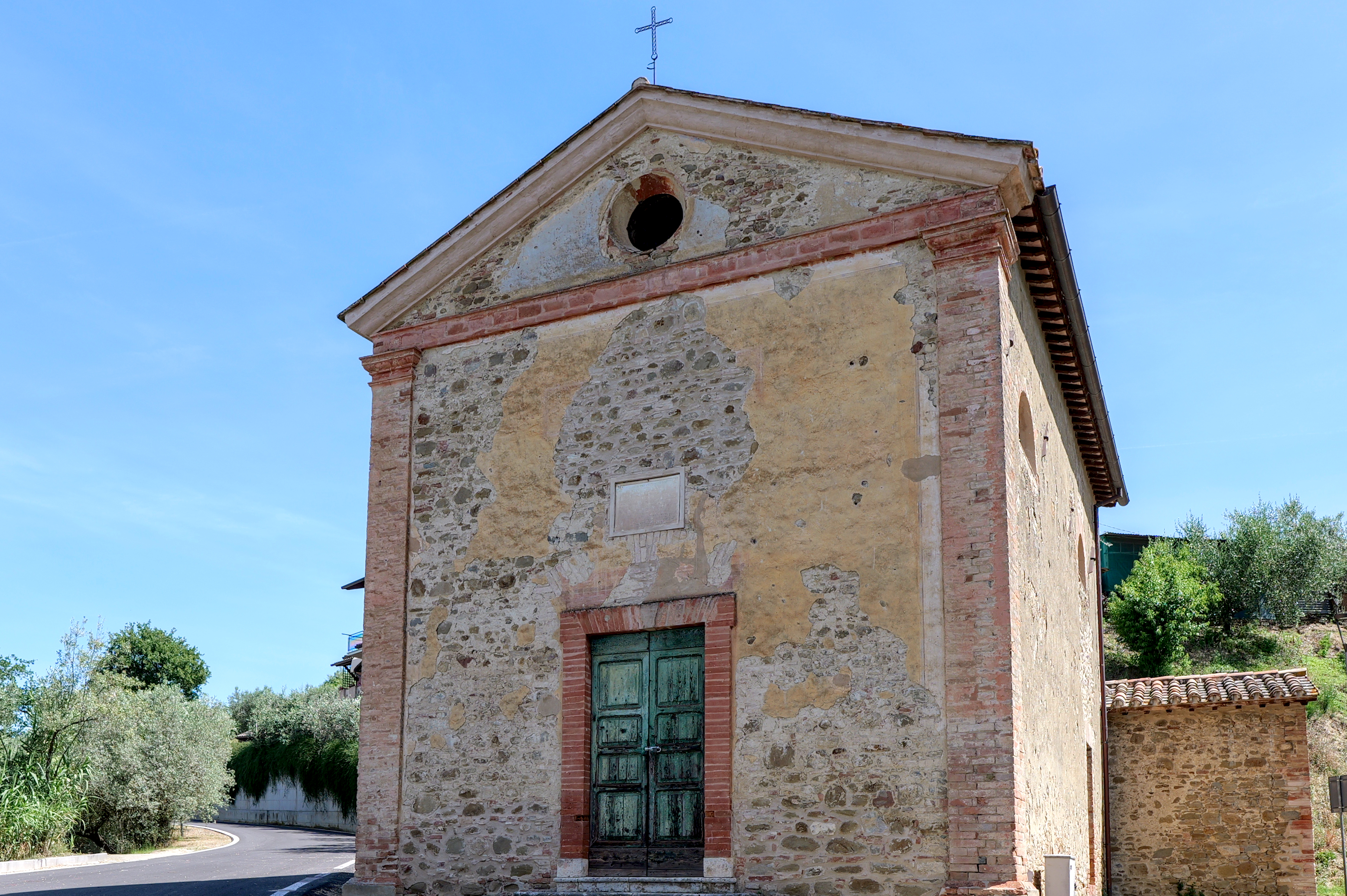
The church of Santa Maria outside the castle

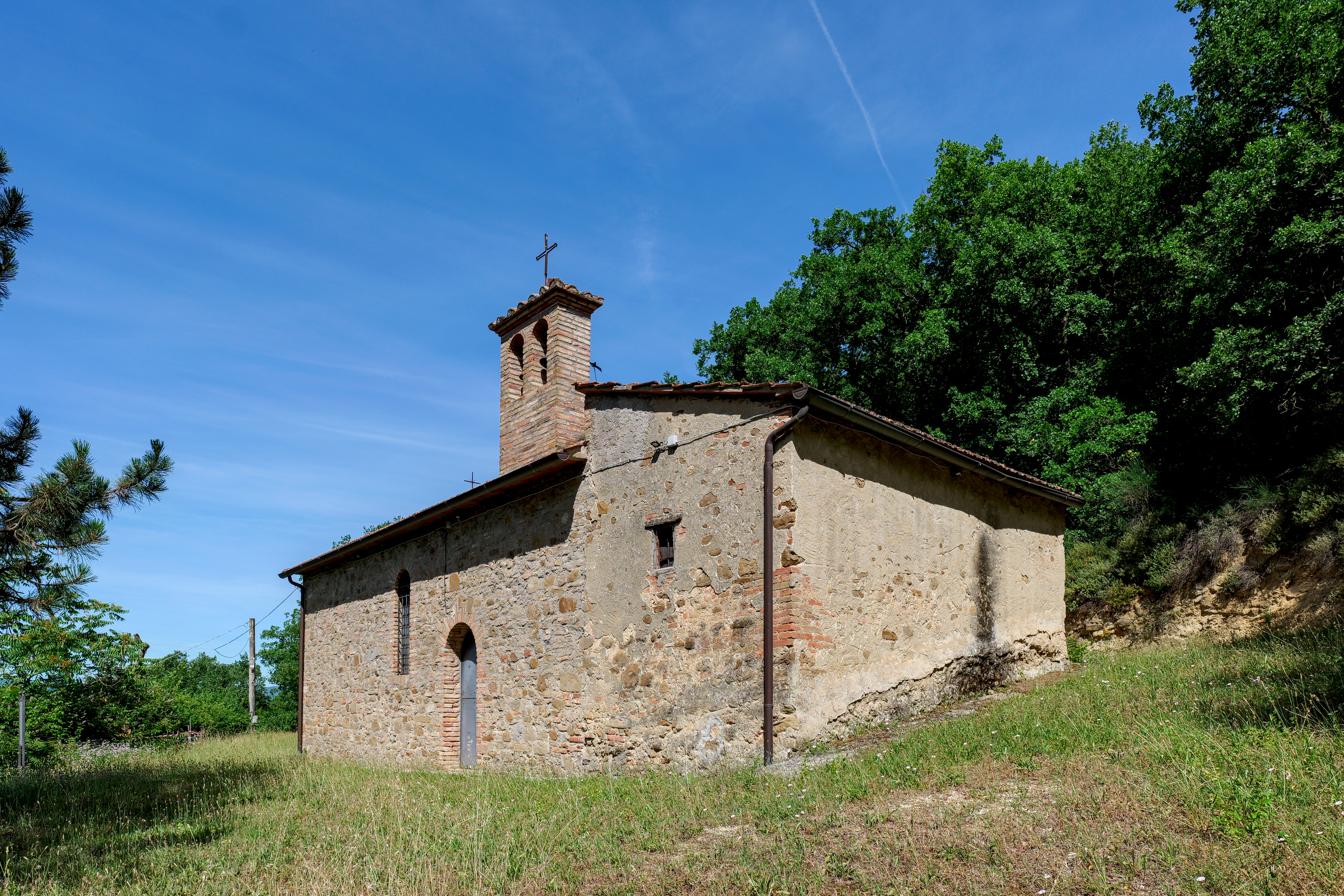
The church of Santa Liberata outside the village
