= Gaglietole =

- Frazione
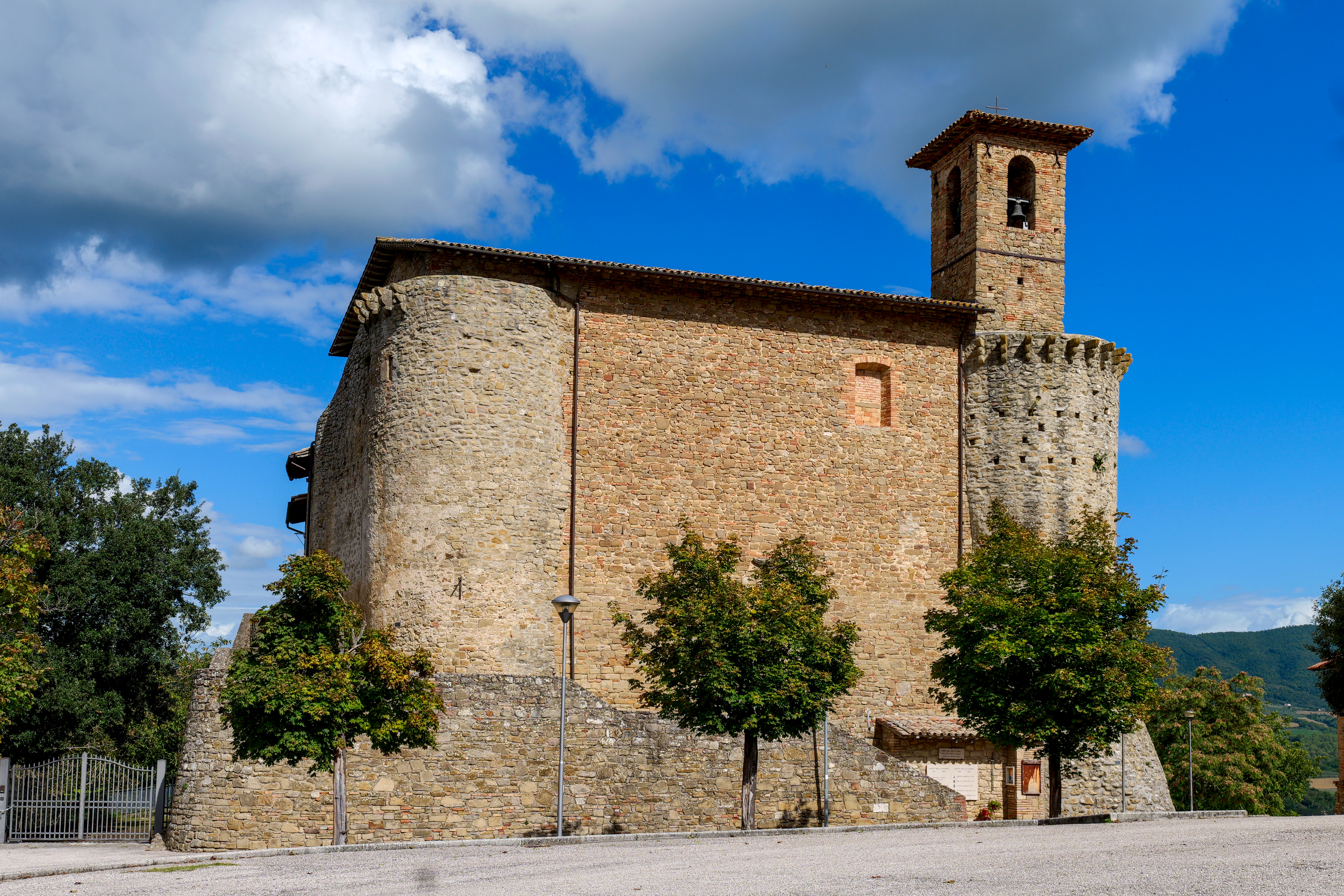
- Gaglietole

- Location within Italy
- Coordinates: 42°55′29″N 12°27′55″E
- Country: Italy
- Region: Umbria
- Province: Perugia
- Comune: Collazzone
- Elevation: 326 m (1,070 ft)

Population (2001)
  - Total: 76
- Time zone: UTC+1 (CET)
  - Summer (DST): UTC+2 (CEST)
- Postcode: 06050
- Dialing code: 075

Gaglietole is a frazione of the comune of Collazzone in the Province of Perugia, Umbria, central Italy. It stands at an elevation of 326 metres above sea level. At the time of the Istat census of 2001 it had 76 inhabitants.

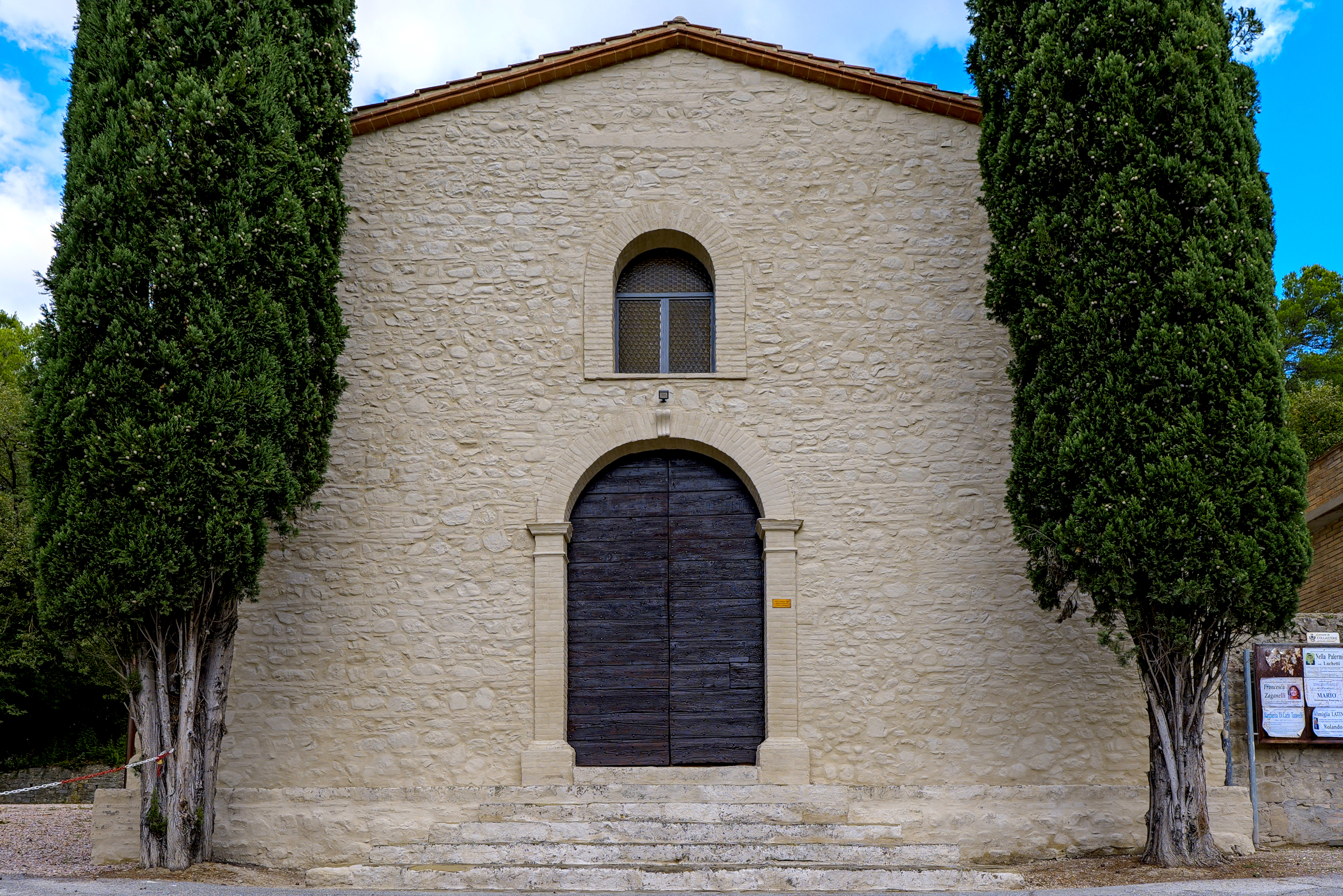
the church Madonna Santissima del Puglia

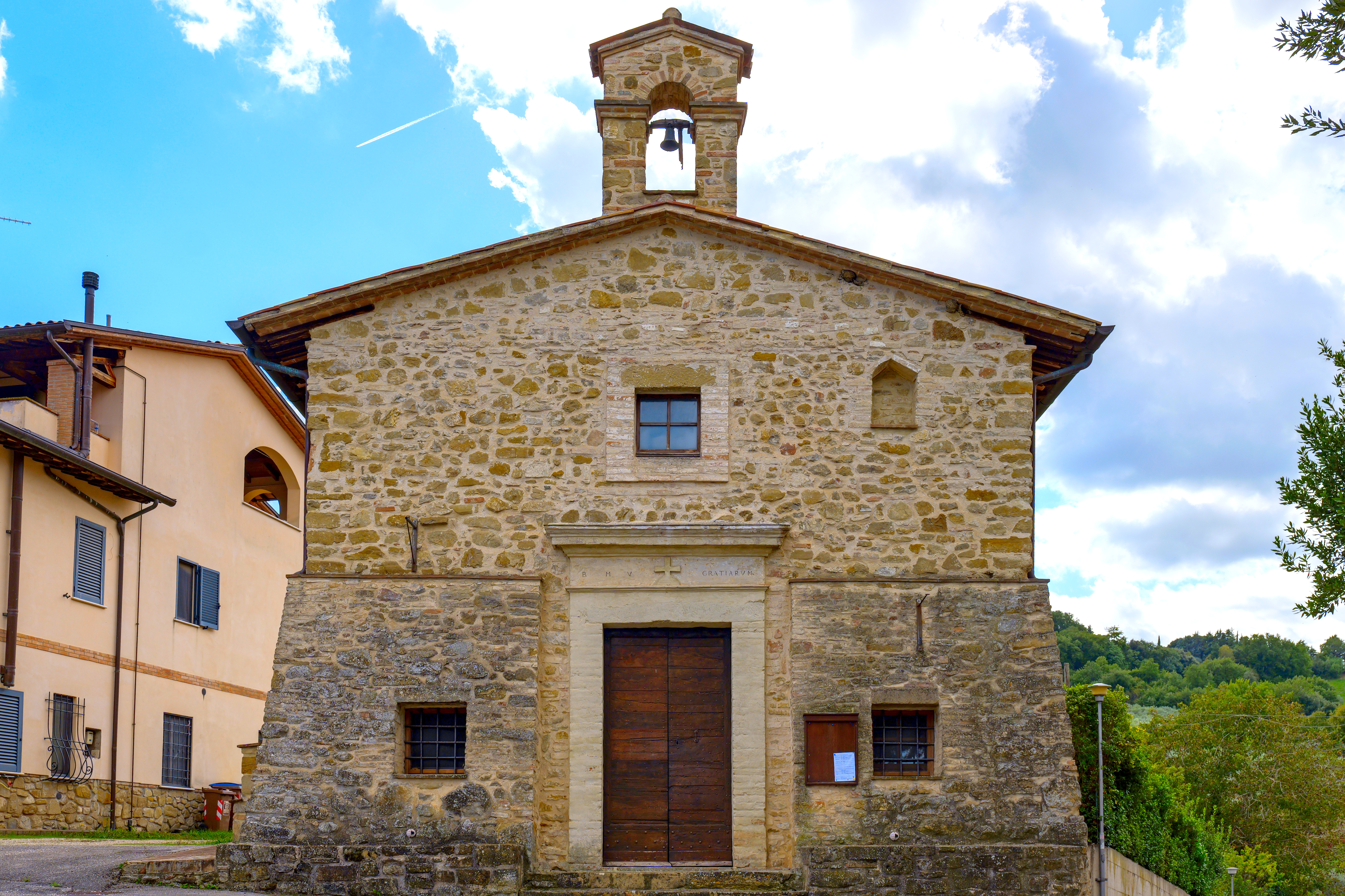
the church Madonna della Grazie
