= Fratta Todina =

- Comune
- Comune di Fratta Todina
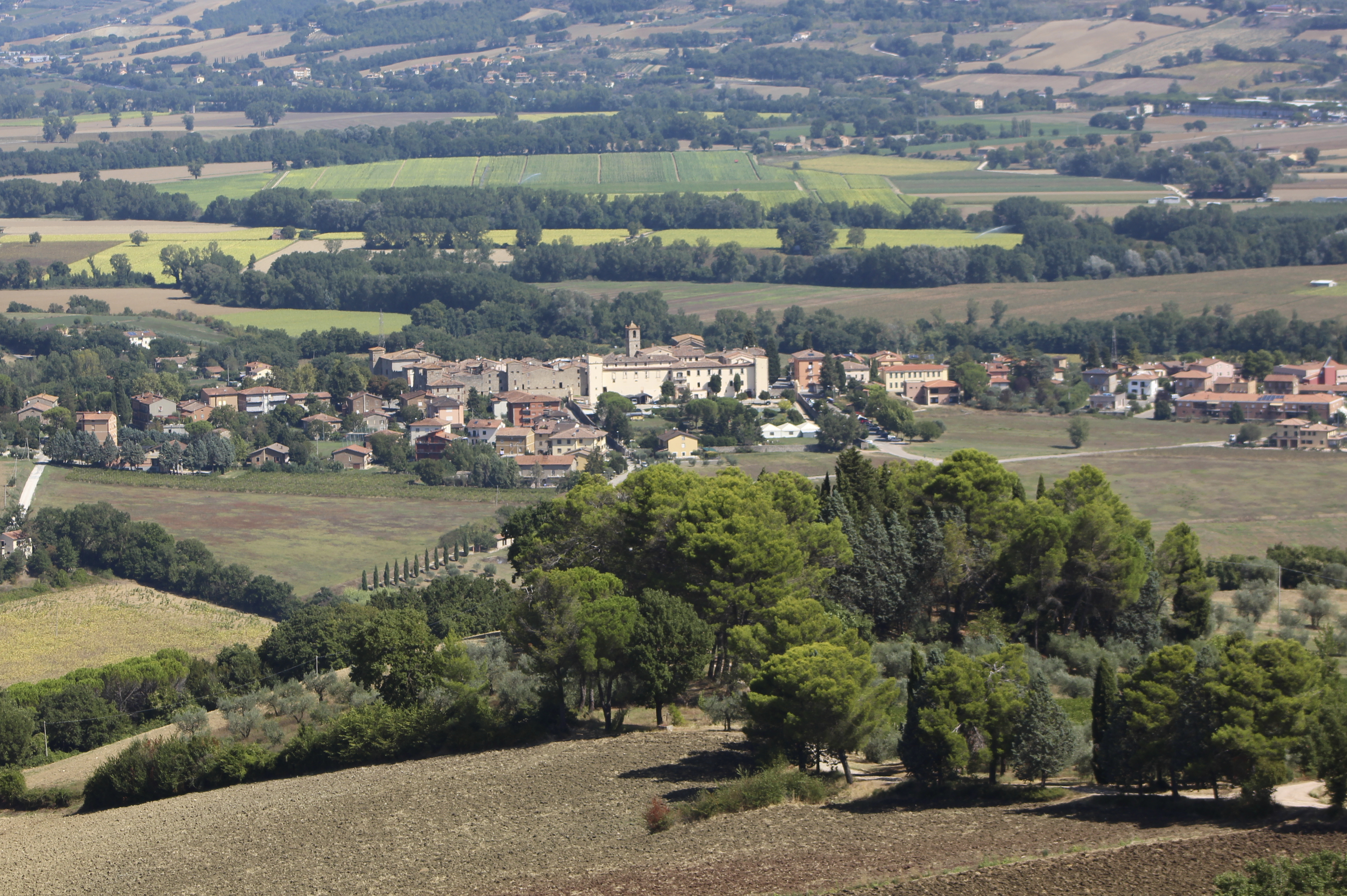
- View of Fratta Todina

- Location within Italy Location within Umbria
- Coordinates: 42.857553°N 12.366562°E
- Country: Italy
- Region: Umbria
- Province: Perugia (PG)

Government
  - Mayor: Giuliana Bicchieraro

Area
  - Total: 17.43 km^{2} (6.73 sq mi)
- Elevation: 215 m (705 ft)

Population (1 January 2025)
  - Total: 1,897
  - Density: 108.8/km^{2} (281.9/sq mi)
- Time zone: UTC+1 (CET)
  - Summer (DST): UTC+2 (CEST)
- Postal code: 06054
- Dialing code: 075
- Website: Official website

Fratta Todina is a comune in the Province of Perugia in the Italian region Umbria, located about 30 km south of Perugia.

== Etymology ==
The name Fratta derives from a defensive palisade enclosure made of interwoven branches, referring to an early fortified structure that gave rise to the settlement.

== History ==
19th-century writers maintained that the modern village arose on the ruins of the ancient Tudernum mentioned by Pliny the Elder. According to this tradition, after its devastation by the Goths it was rebuilt on land belonging to the episcopal mensa of Todi, from which it derived the name Fracta Episcopi, found in various documents.

Fratta is first mentioned in 1177, during the descent of Frederick I Barbarossa into Italy.

During the communal age the area was involved in the conflicts between the Guelph cities of Perugia and Orvieto and the Ghibelline centres of Todi, Amelia and Spoleto. Repeated attacks marked this period, and the settlement was transformed from a villa into a castrum.

The decision of the municipality of Todi in 1331 to fortify Fratta with walls marked its definitive transformation into a castle. A few decades later, in 1367, Angel de Grimoard was installed there, and Fratta became a personal fief of the governor, a phase associated with decline and desolation.

In 1416 Carlo Malatesta of Rimini and several captains captured with him in battle near Perugia were imprisoned in its fortress.

In the 15th century Braccio Fortebraccio enlarged and fortified the castle, using it as a military base. After the end of Fortebracci lordship in the mid-15th century, Fratta returned to the Vicariate of Todi.

Elevated to capital of the entire district in 1587, Fratta received the dignity of a vicariate from the bishop a decade later, in 1597. Under Bishop Angelo Cesi the town underwent urban and economic development. During this period the Porta della Spineta was opened, an episcopal villa was established, and a building was designated as the seat of the municipal assembly and gymnasium.

Government in the early 17th century was entrusted to two massari exercising magisterial and prioral functions, subject to the oversight of the Sacra Consulta and the Congregazione del Buon Governo.

In the late 18th century it was incorporated into the Canton of Montecastello di Vibio within the Department of Trasimeno. After the first Restoration it was included in the Canton of Marsciano within the District of Todi and governed by a maire.

In 1810 Fratta was suppressed and annexed to Montecastello. Following the Restoration after 1810 it was included in the Apostolic Delegation of Perugia under the government of Marsciano.

During the 19th century Fratta was elevated to the status of a municipality, subject to the podesteria of Montecastello. In the mid-19th century Fratta Todina had a population of 1,247 inhabitants. Of these, 217 lived in the town and 1,030 in the countryside.

The annexation of Umbria to the Kingdom of Italy by plebiscite in 1860 brought it into the unified Italian state, and two years later the municipality adopted the name Fratta Todina.

== Geography ==
Fratta Todina stands on the right bank of the Tiber, and lies in a flat and relatively low-lying position, about 5 miles (8.0 km) from Todi. The area is subject to frequent fog, and the prevailing wind is from the south-east.

Fratta Todina borders the following municipalities: Collazzone, Marsciano, Monte Castello di Vibio, San Venanzo, Todi.

=== Subdivisions ===
The municipality includes the localities of Ca' Carbone, Casaccia, Casaiole, Foresco, Fratta Todina, Pallotta, Poggio delle Fonti, Pontecane, Sant'Angelo, Stazione.

In 2021, 683 people lived in rural dispersed dwellings not assigned to any named locality. At the time, most of the population lived in Fratta Todina proper (669).

== Religion and culture ==
=== Church of San Sabino ===
The parish church of San Sabino has a single nave with a rectangular hall covered by a barrel vault, decorated with stars, and articulated by lateral windows. Four arches on each side support strongly projecting cornices, while additional arches house side chapels.

The interior includes several chapels with 17th-century artworks. Notable works include an altarpiece of the Madonna del Carmine with saints, a statue of Saint Michael the Archangel copied from Andrea Sansovino, and an altarpiece of the Madonna of the Rosary by Andrea Polinori.

=== Other religious heritage ===
Outside of the town, in the neighborhood of Santa Maria della Spineta, is the convent of the same name, and the attached church of Santa Maria Assunta.

The church of Fratta was at various times held by members of the ducal family of Cesi serving as parish priests, some of whom later became bishops of Todi.

=== Palazzo Altieri ===
Palazzo Altieri was built in the second half of the 16th century by Bishop Angelo Cesi and later enlarged between 1643 and 1654 by Cardinal Altieri. During this period the building saw the addition of elaborate gardens featuring complex waterworks and fountains.

The courtyard includes two porticoed sides, a loggia with stucco decoration and a large balcony opening onto the garden, beneath which stands the fountain of the episcopal palace. Inside, the palace contains a gallery decorated with frescoes of the Roman school depicting biblical scenes.
