= Collazzone =

- Comune
- Comune di Collazzone
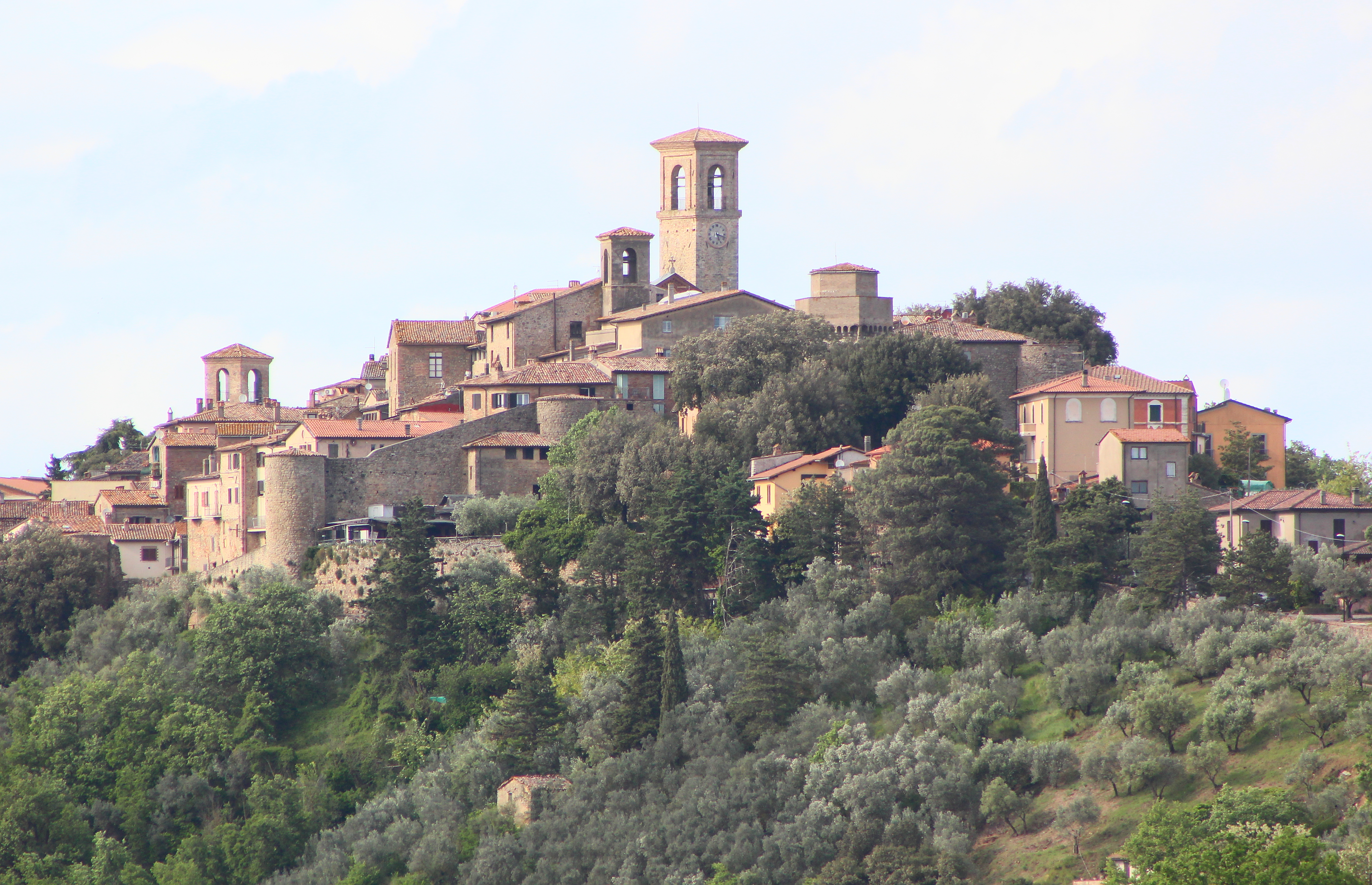
- View of Collazzone

- Location within Italy Location within Umbria
- Coordinates: 42.899572°N 12.435981°E
- Country: Italy
- Region: Umbria
- Province: Perugia

Government
  - Mayor: Francesco Bennicelli

Area
  - Total: 55.68 km^{2} (21.50 sq mi)
- Elevation: 469 m (1,539 ft)

Population (1 January 2025)
  - Total: 3,288
  - Density: 59.05/km^{2} (152.9/sq mi)
- Demonym: Collazzonesi
- Time zone: UTC+1 (CET)
  - Summer (DST): UTC+2 (CEST)
- Postal code: 06050
- Dialing code: 075
- Patron saint: Lawrence of Rome
- Saint day: August 10
- Website: Official website

Collazzone is a comune (municipality) in the Province of Perugia in the Italian region Umbria, located about 25 km south of Perugia.

== Etymology ==
Collazzone was formerly known as Colle di Azzone. According to local tradition, it was founded and owned by Attone (or Azzone), a powerful lord and descendant of Hildeprand of Spoleto from whom the settlement derived its name.

== History ==
The settlement is traditionally traced to the 8th century, when its foundation was attributed to Azzone of the Atti family, acting on behalf of the dukes of Spoleto.

From the early 11th century onward the original hill village underwent gradual urban expansion, and satellite settlements developed around the initial nucleus. During the 11th and 12th centuries the decline of the Lombard duchies enabled the assertion of greater local autonomy, followed by involvement in the conflicts between Guelph and Ghibelline factions.

The castle suffered repeated devastation at the hands of Guglielmo dei Pazzi, first in 1218, again in 1220, and once more in 1271.

In 1250 Collazzone was sold to Todi and had several castles under its authority. It was destroyed in 1314 during the war between Perugia and Todi.

In 1332 the settlement was absorbed into the rule of the Baglioni family of Perugia, whose control lasted until 1647, when the death of Orazio Baglioni brought their lordship to an end. It was then incorporated into the Papal administration together with Cannara, Bettona, Collemancio and Castelbuono.

During the Napoleonic period the territory was separated from Todi and placed within the administrative district of the Department of Trasimeno. In 1817 it was recognized as an autonomous municipality under the government and district of Todi in the Delegation of Perugia.

In 1895 the municipality had a population of 2,766 inhabitants.

== Geography ==
Collazzone occupies the summit of a steep hill facing the Tiber, commanding an extensive view over the surrounding countryside. The town center is enclosed by high walls and has a single entrance, once protected by outer defensive works. At the lower end of the town stands a small fortress; a bell tower with a public clock later occupied the site.

The Tiber flows about 3 miles (4.8 km) from the town, while the torrent Puglia runs nearer. The climate is described as rather cold and subject to snow.

Collazzone borders the following municipalities: Bettona, Deruta, Fratta Todina, Gualdo Cattaneo, Marsciano, Todi.

=== Subdivisions ===
The municipality includes the localities of Acquasanta, Assignano, Canalicchio, Carceri, Casalalta, Collazzone, Collepepe, Gaglietole, Le Palombare, Piedicolle.

In 2021, 1,130 people lived in rural dispersed dwellings not assigned to any named locality. At the time, most of the population lived in Collepepe (1,370), and Collazzone proper (364).

== Economy ==
Agriculture formed the basis of the local economy in the 19th century, with production of grain, wine, oil, acorns, timber and livestock.

== Religion and culture ==
The archpriestal church of Madonna delle Grazie in Collazzone contains five altars and an organ. There is also an ancient convent of Franciscan nuns, with the adjoining church of San Michele Arcangelo.

The feast of San Lorenzo is celebrated on 10 August as a popular festival.

In 1736 a statue of Hercules was discovered in the countryside near the town, giving rise to the belief that ancient ruins there belonged to a temple of that deity.

=== San Michele Arcangelo ===
The church of San Michele Arcangelo stands along the present-day Corso Vittorio Emanuele III, which follows the line of the ancient decumanus of the vicus within the castrum, in the center of Collazzone. In 1370 it was annexed to the convent of the Poor Clares of San Lorenzo dentro le mura, and it probably originated as the castle's earliest chapel. Over the entrance, on the lowered gable, it still bears a clearly legible barbaric monogram of the Redemption. Frescoes dating to the 14th and 16th centuries have been discovered on its walls in recent times.

=== San Lorenzo ===
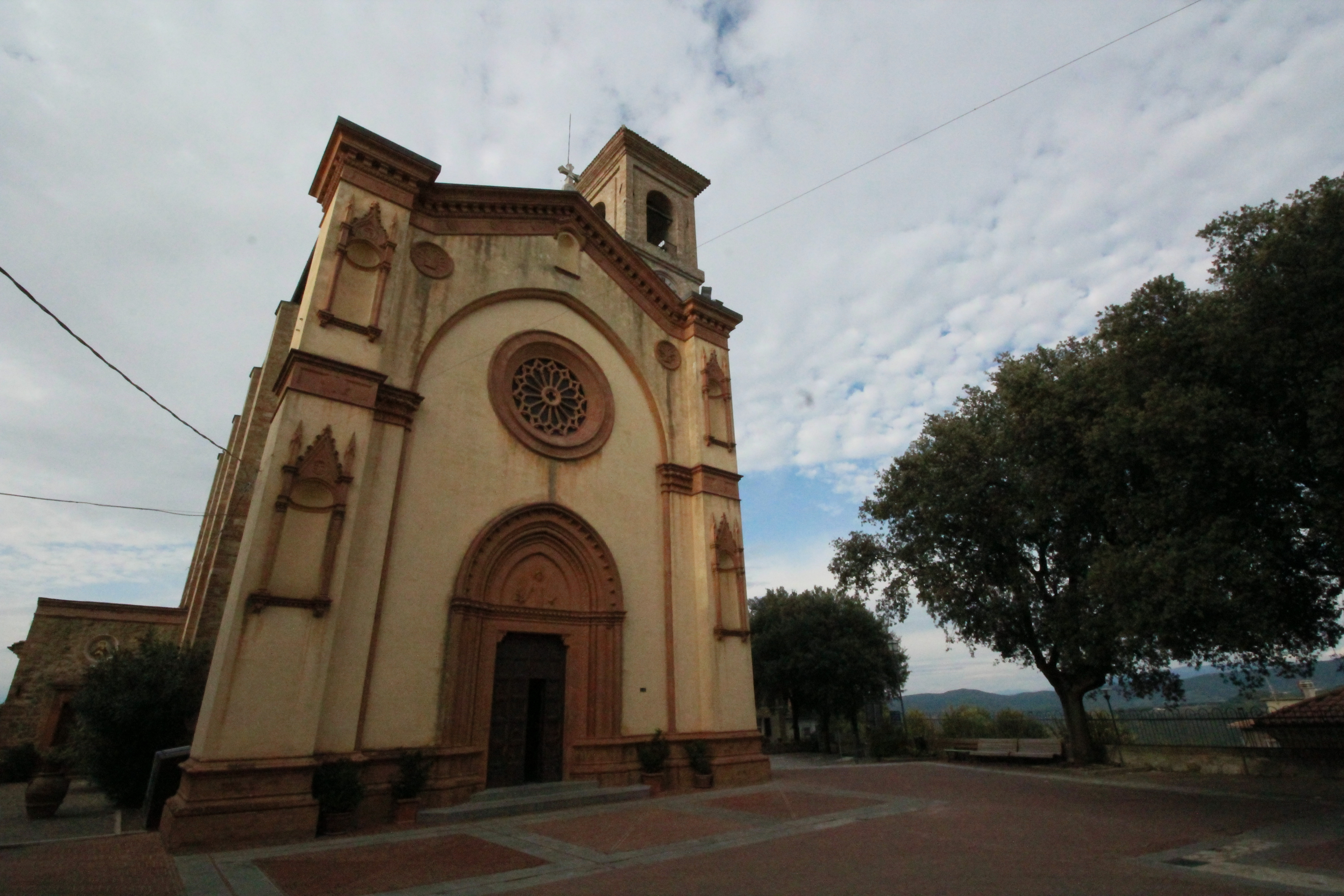
Church of San Lorenzo

The parish church of San Lorenzo was built between the 19th and 20th centuries on what had once been the castle's cassero (keep). Its façade is distinguished by a large rose window and by decorations in local terracotta.

Inside are artworks of interest, including a 13th-century polychrome wooden sculpture of the Madonna and Child, regarded as among the highest examples of Umbrian art. Two angels of local workmanship were added beside the tabernacle in the 15th century. On the right-hand wall there is also a small but notable fresco of the Madonna and Child, attributed to the 14th century.

=== Abbey of San Lorenzo ===
The Benedictine abbey of San Lorenzo stands on a hill known as San Giovanni, a short distance from the locality of the same name. The hill also once contained a very ancient church that has now been completely destroyed. Its name is linked to the order of the Knights of Saint John, who owned the whole area after it had formerly belonged to the Templars.

The complex originated as a Benedictine abbey and is first mentioned in documents in 1227, when one Oddone di Pietro donated several parcels of land to Abbot Guglielmo. On the evidence of the Romanesque crypt, the construction of the building is thought to date at least to the 11th century.

The original layout of the monastic complex is now difficult to discern because of the substantial alterations made over the centuries. The most visible part is the church, a simple structure divided into three naves by round arches and covered with a timber truss roof.

Older in date is the Romanesque crypt which, despite modifications carried out in the 17th century, retains its original plan. It has a rectangular layout covered by four groin vaults supported by transverse arches that spring from a single central column. The crypt contains the tomb of Matilde Marzia, mother of the Blessed Simone da Collazione, who died in 1240 and was buried in the convent.

=== Other heritage sites ===
- Franciscan nunnery
- Portal in Piazza Jacopone, attributed to Giacomo Vignola
- Santa Maria Assunta in Collepepe: Romanesque and Gothic architecture church.

== Notable people ==
Collazzone was the birthplace, in 1240, of the Franciscan Blessed Simone. Jacopone da Todi died there.

Among the principal families of the municipality were the Cascianelli and the Piergentili. In Collepepe the wealthiest family was that of the Cavaliere Pier Domenico Costantini-Baldini, who is recorded as serving as Minister of Commerce and Industry in Rome in the mid-19th century.
