= San Giovanni Battista, Marsciano =

Church in Marsciano, Italy

Coordinates: 42.9103591°N 12.3379757°E

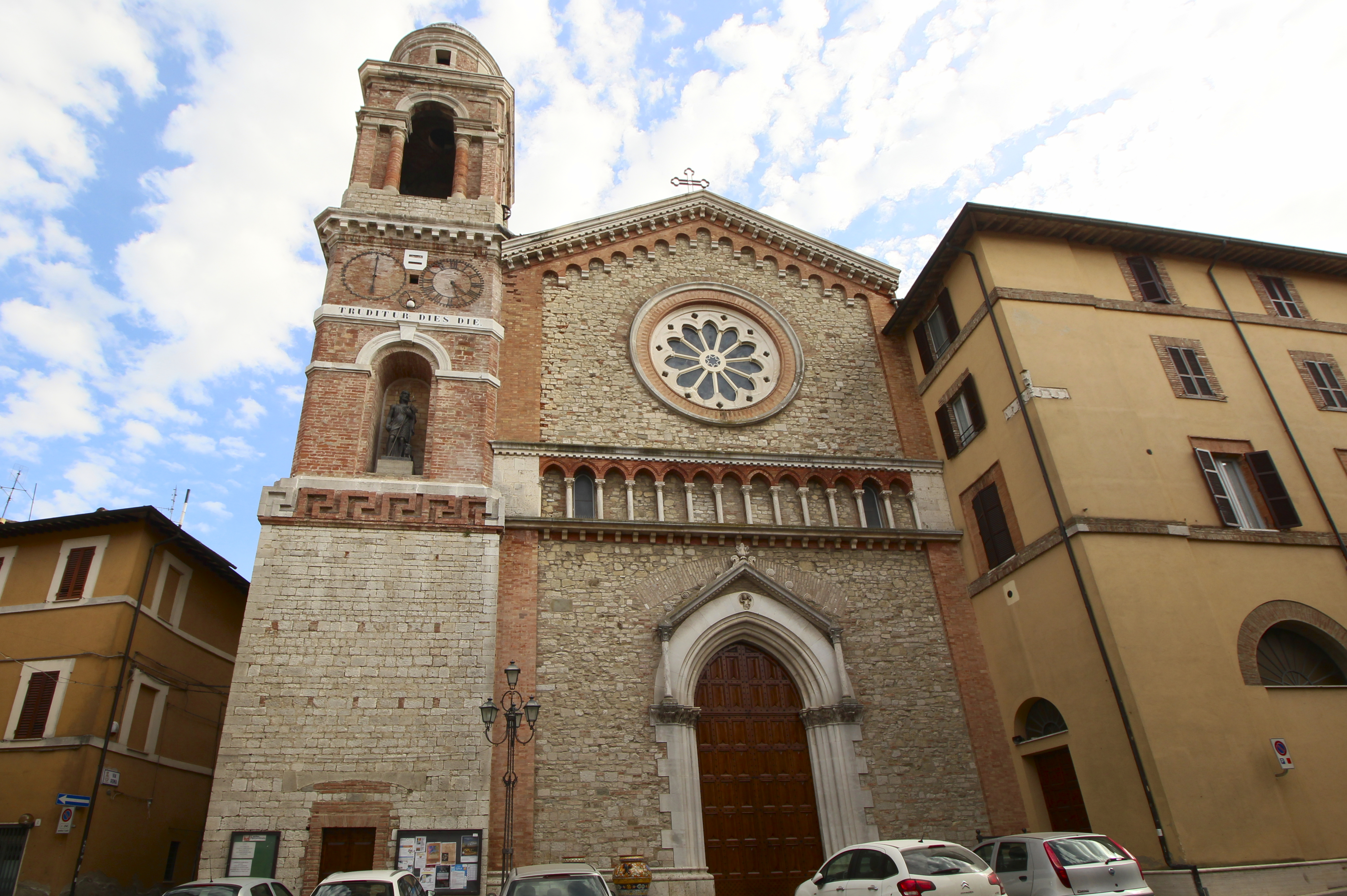
The church San Giovanni Battista in Marsciano

San Giovanni Battista is a Gothic Revival-style, Roman Catholic church in Marsciano, in the province of Perugia, Umbria, Italy.

== History ==
The present church rebuilt around 1896 in brick and stone replaced a 14th-century structure, utilizing some of the spolia. It has a large rose window and a unilateral campanile. The interiors contain a 13th-century painted crucifix, a 16th-century Madonna and Child and a painting depicting the Incredulity of St Thomas (1831) by Vincenzo Chialli.
