= Angiolo Tricca =

Italian painter (1817–1884)

Angiolo Tricca (17 February 1817 – 23 March 1884) was an Italian caricaturist and painter of historical themes.

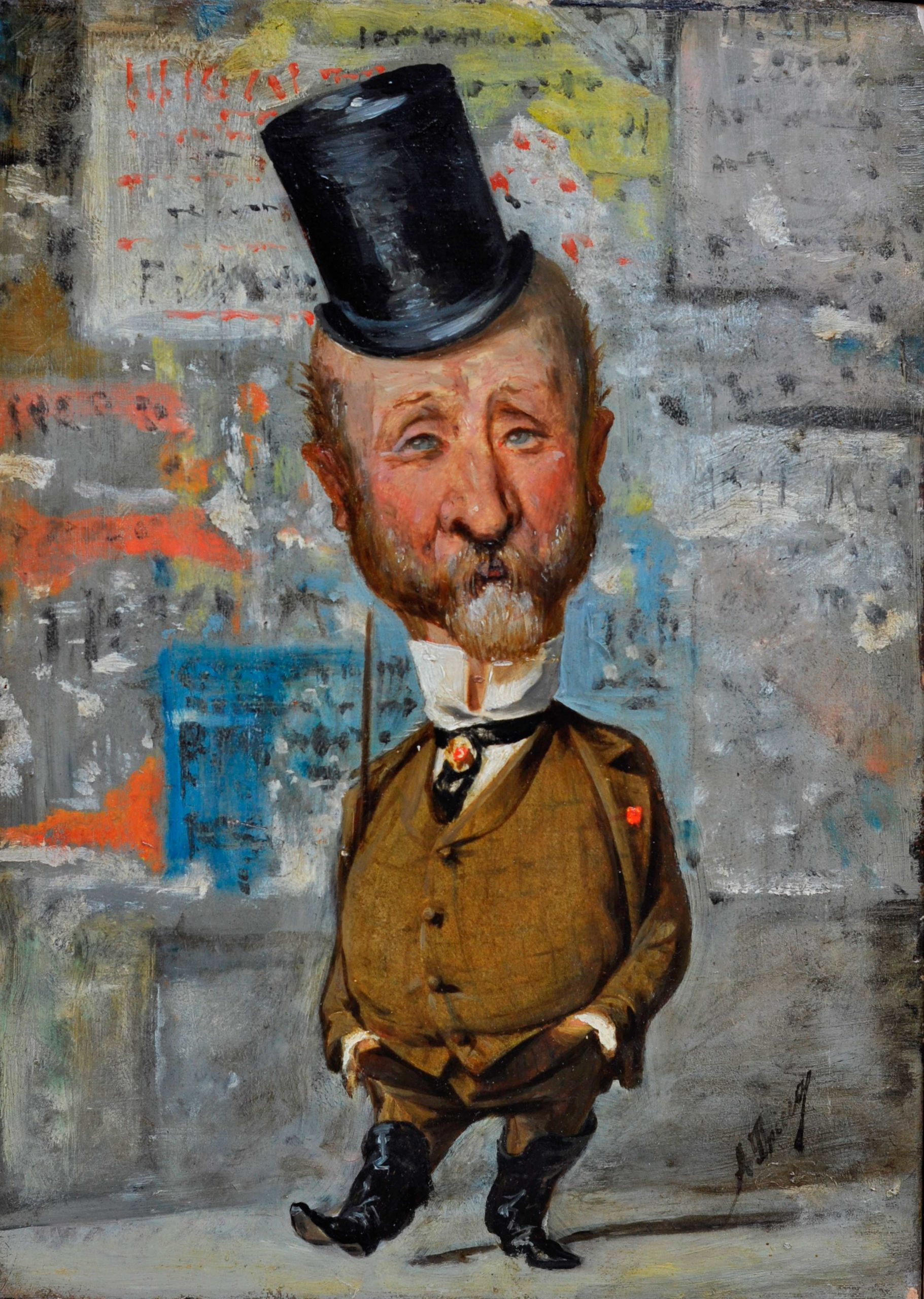
Caricature of Collodi, the author of Pinocchio

Born in Sansepolcro, he became a pupil of the painter Vincenzo Chialli. His best known works are the caricatures of Italian artists who attended the Caffè Michelangiolo in Florence (such as Collodi, Giovanni Fattori, Telemaco Signorini and Odoardo Borrani). He collaborated with making satirical cartoons, often pseudonymously, for journals published in Florence such as Il Piovano Arlotto, Il Lampione, and La Lanterna di Diogene. He also opened a gallery and antiquarian shop, where he often copied or repaired antique works.

One of his pupils was Federico Andreotti and his son, Fosco Tricca.

== Sources ==
- Martina Alessio, Silvestra Bietoletti, Valentino Baldacci, Andrea Rauch, Attilio Brilli e Piero Scapecchi (a cura di). Angiolo Tricca e la caricatura toscana dell'Ottocento. Firenze, Giunti, 1993. ISBN 88-09-20345-3.
