= Giuseppe Chialli =

Italian sculptor

- Born: 1800; Città di Castello
- Died: 23 December 1839 (aged 38–39); Rome

Giuseppe Chialli (1800 in Città di Castello – 23 December 1839 in Rome) was an Italian sculptor.

He was the younger brother of the painter Vincenzo Chialli. He first studied in Rome under Antonio Canova, and moved in 1819 with Tommaso Minardi to Perugia. Afterwards, he was an assistant to Thorvaldsen. Among his works are a bas relief of the Judgement of Paris and the statue of St Mark in the niche to the right of the entrance of the Church of Gran Madre di Dio, Turin.
