= Piedicolle =

- Frazione
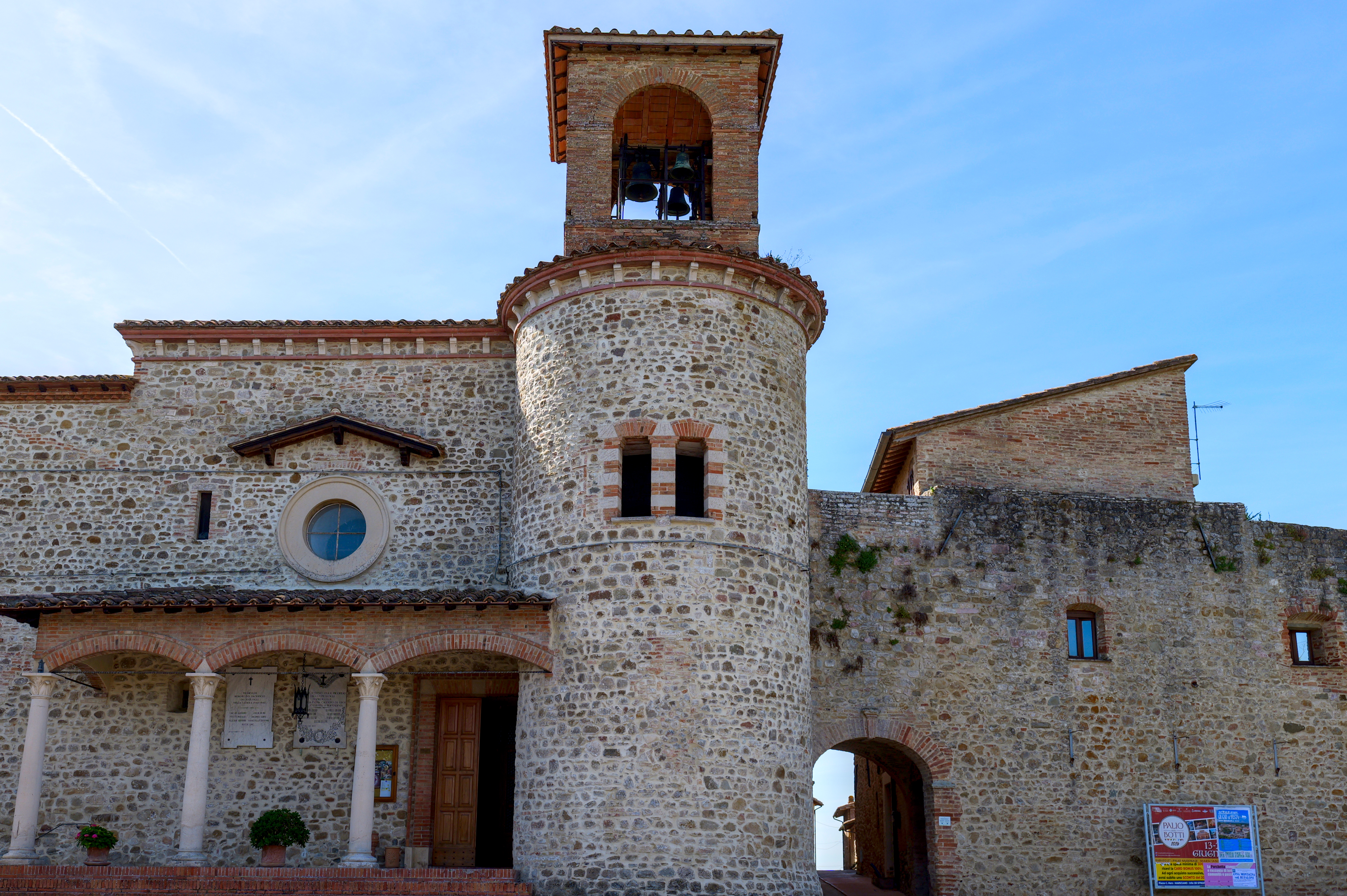
- Piedicolle

- Location within Italy
- Coordinates: 42°53′41″N 12°24′14″E
- Country: Italy
- Region: Umbria
- Province: Perugia
- Comune: Collazzone
- Elevation: 324 m (1,063 ft)

Population (2001)
  - Total: 115
- Time zone: UTC+1 (CET)
  - Summer (DST): UTC+2 (CEST)
- Postcode: 06050
- Dialing code: 075

Piedicolle is a frazione of the comune of Collazzone in the Province of Perugia, Umbria, central Italy. It stands at an elevation of 324 metres above sea level. At the time of the Istat census of 2001 it had 115 inhabitants.
