= Fosco Tricca =

Italian painter (1856–1918)

Fosco Tricca (March 2, 1856 – 1918) was an Italian painter.

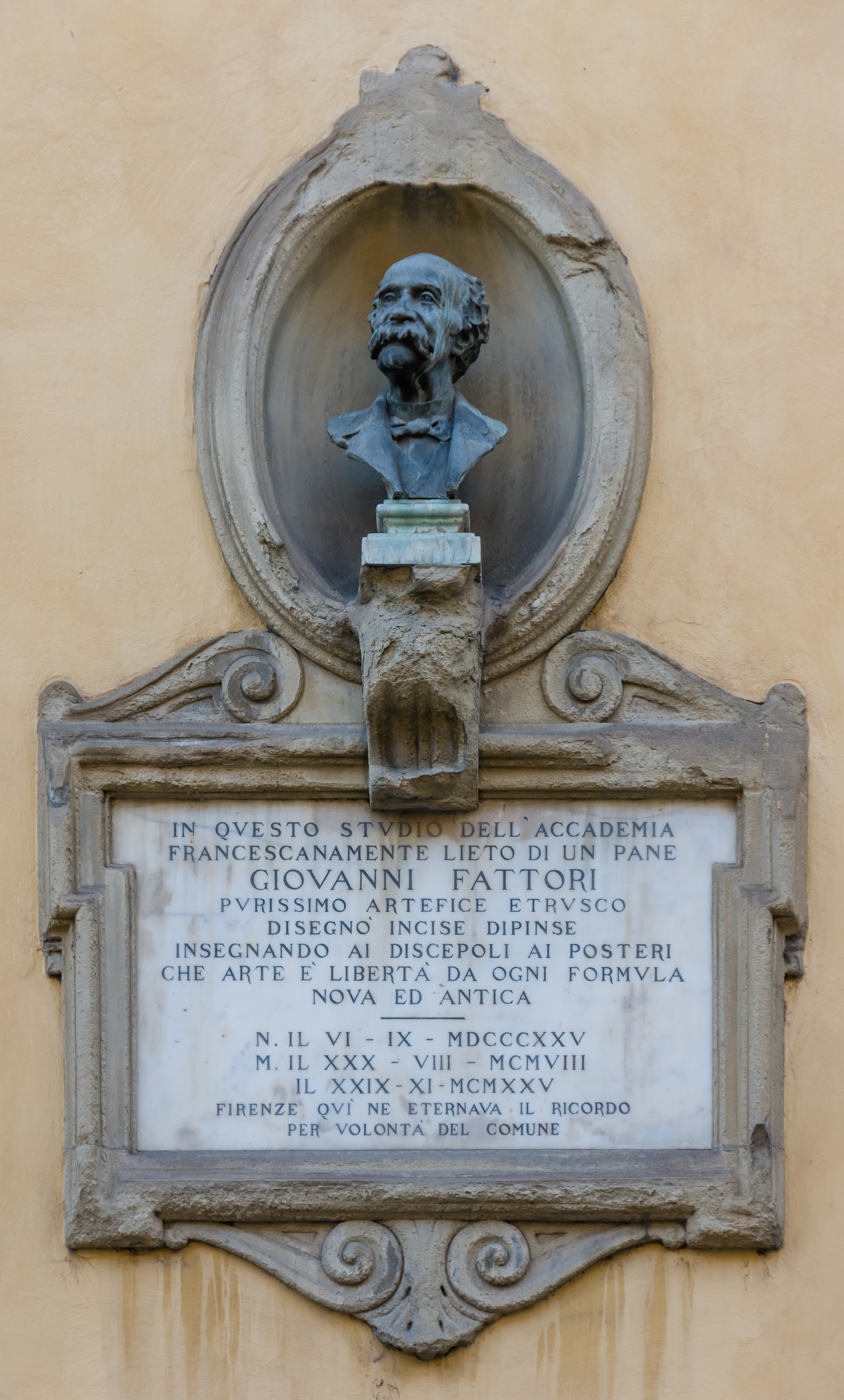
Monument to the Livornese painter Giovanni Fattori on the wall of the Accademia di Belle Arti di Firenze (Academy of Fine Arts of Florence), in Via Battisti. The bust is the work of the sculptor Fosco Tricca.

== Biography ==
Tricca was born in Florence, Grand Duchy of Tuscany. He studied art under the direction of his father, the artist, restorer and copyist Angiolo Tricca, and the professor Michele Gordigiani. he began by painting small canvases of diverse subjects. In Trieste, he exhibited a half-figure depicting: An Odalisque; in Milan in 1880, he displayed a painting titled: Tipi ameni fiorentini. At the Promotrice he displayed a painting depicting: Sant'Antonio. He painted a canvas depicting San Romualdo, founder of the Carmelitan Order for the church degli Angeli in Florence; La beata Lucia delle Sette Fonti, and the bishop and martyr St Boniface. He completed here a painting titled: I signori del tribunale, a realist composition sent to the Exposition of Palermo of 1891. Tricca served for a year as vice-president and for two years as head of the Circolo artistico fiorentino.

His painting, Looking at the Carnival (1881) is at the Kelvingrove Museum in Glasgow.
