= Vincenzo Chialli =

Italian painter (1787–1840)

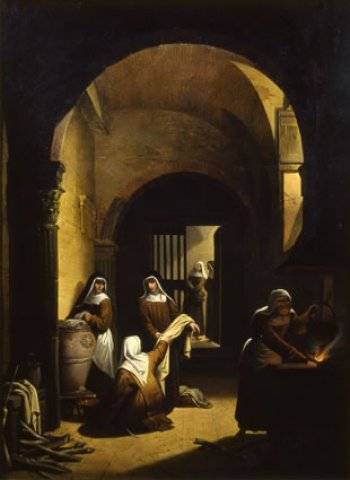
Il bucato delle cappuccine, oil painting from ca. 1835, now at the Galleria Nazionale d'Arte Moderna in Rome.

Vincenzo Chialli (27 July 1787 – 24 September 1840) was an Italian painter.

== Biography ==
Chialli was born at Città di Castello. After having learned the rudiments of art in that town, he visited Rome at the age of seventeen years, and became a disciple of Camuccini, whom he afterwards imitated. His brother, Giuseppe, (1800-1839), became a sculptor. After leaving Rome Vincenzo painted religious subjects at Borgo San Sepolcro, Urbino, Pesaro, and Venice, from whence he retraced his steps to Rome; but as the climate did not suit him, he left that city in 1822 and returned to Citta di Castello. He became Director of the School of Painting at Cortona in 1835, and died in 1840. Among his pupils were Angiolo Tricca. His genre and historical paintings gained him considerable credit. The most important are:

- The Churchyard and The Mass, both in the Pitti Palace at Florence.
- Dante in the Abbey of Fonte Avellana. Private Collection Italy
- Raphael and Fra Bartolommeo in the Convent of San Marco.
- The young Raphael with his Parents.
