= Pietro Paolo Sensini =

Italian painter

Pietro Paolo Sensini (1555 – 1632) was an Italian painter active in a Mannerist-style painting religious altarpieces mainly in his native city of Todi and nearby towns in Umbria.

== Biography ==
He was born in Todi to a prominent family. He worked alongside Ferraù Fenzoni, Bartolomeo Barbiani, and Andrea Polinori. From 1585 to 1606 he was engaged in creating a number of lunette frescoes for the refectory of the Monastery SS. Annunziata in Todi. Frescoes in the guest room of the Annunciation and the Nativity (restored in the 18th century) are also attributed to Sensini.

The Museo Civico Pinacoteca in Todi holds a 1608 Deposition by Sensini. Benedetto de Ceccho of Rocchette castle commissioned a painting of "The Madonna of Loreto with Child".

The Sanctuary of Santa Maria della Pace in Massa Martana has a San Francesco in prayer by him. Also in Massa Martana, in the Santuario della Madonna di Castelvecchio, there is a 1581 Madonna and Child on the main altar, and a painting of Saint Charles Borromeo in a side altar.

He painted a second San Carlo Borromeo in 1615 for the Church of San Lorenzo in Collazzone, which also hold an Adorazione dei Pastori ("Adoration of the Shepherds").

He was a member of the communal council in 1619.

In 2021, Sensini's 1596 Assumption into heaven of Mary surrounded by the Apostles was cleaned and restored. It was relocated to the third chapel of the right aisle of San Fortunato in Todi. On the back wall, in the center, is an altarpiece depicting a Crucifixion with St John and the Virgin (1590). Sensini's 1611, Deposition from the cross with Mary between Saints Anthony the Abbot and Peter the Hermit, commissioned by the Confraternita dei Calzolari, was restored and relocated to the church of Sant'Antonio.
