= Santa Maria della Pace, Massa Martana =

Church in Massa Martana, Italy

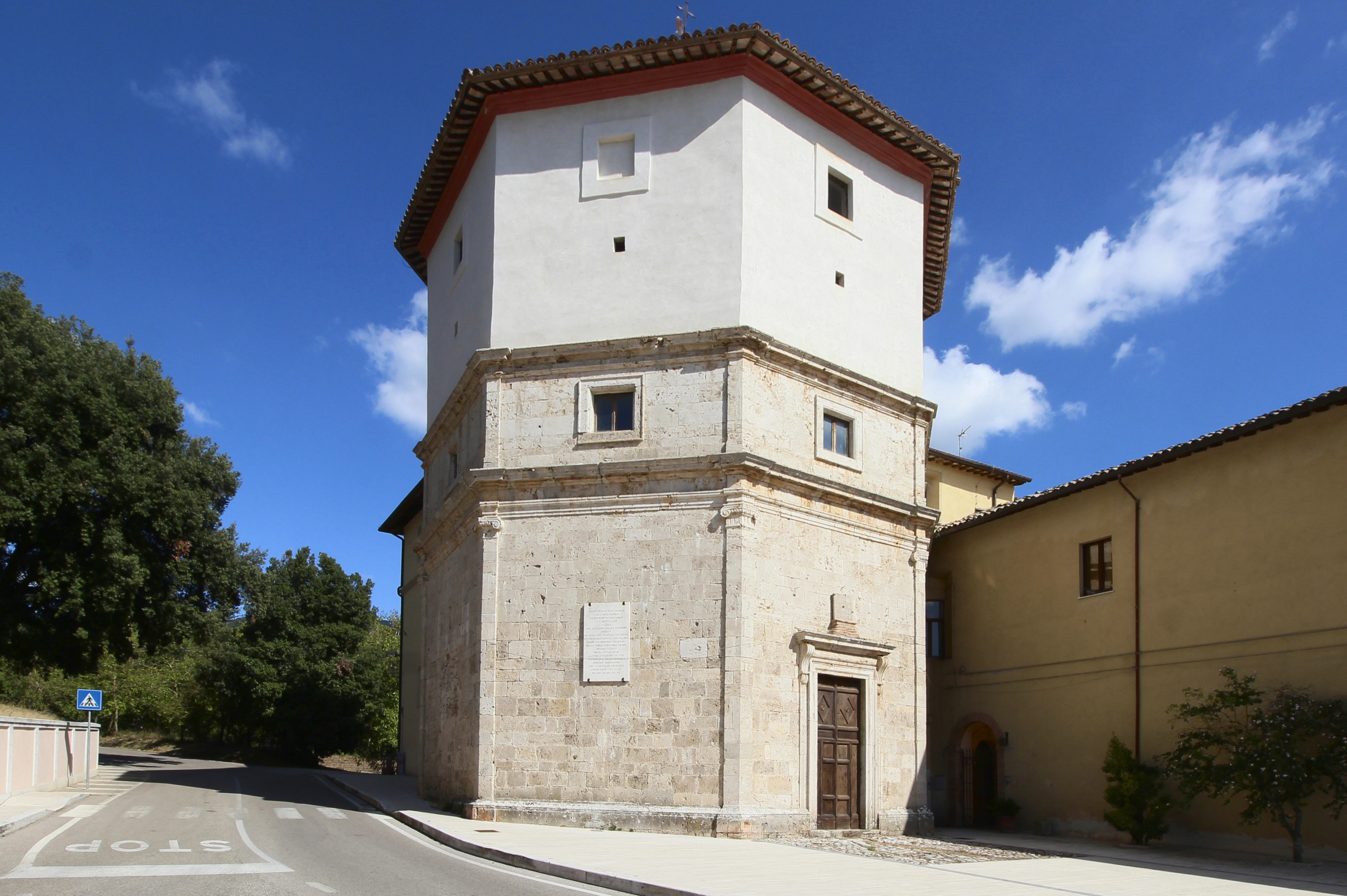
View of the church

San Maria della Pace is a Renaissance-style, Roman Catholic, Marian sanctuary-church and convent in the town of Massa Martana, province of Perugia, Umbria, Italy. The former convent building also houses part of the town library and archive system.

== History ==
The church was built during 1521-1589 along the pilgrimage route of the via Flaminia. Putatively part of the design is attributed to the painter Andrea Polinori. The church, like many sanctuaries of this type, consolidated outside of the town around a roadside aedicule depicting a 15th-century image of the Madonna lactating between St John the Baptist and St James. The sanctuary was associated with the Franciscans of the third order of St Francis. The church has a centralized octagonal plan influenced in 1600.

The cupola was densely frescoed (1647-1649) by Polinori with scenes from the old and new testament of the bible, as well as apostles, saints and angelic musicians. Among the other works in the church are an altarpiece depicting St Charles Borromeo in adoration of the Crucifix (1612) behind main altar; a St Francis assigning the cintola to the third order of Franciscans (1613) in second altar on right; a St Francis in prayer by Pietro Paolo Sensini; and a Virgin in prayer in the style of Andrea Barbiani.
