= Fortunatus of Todi =

Umbrian bishop and saint (died 537)

Saint Fortunatus of Todi
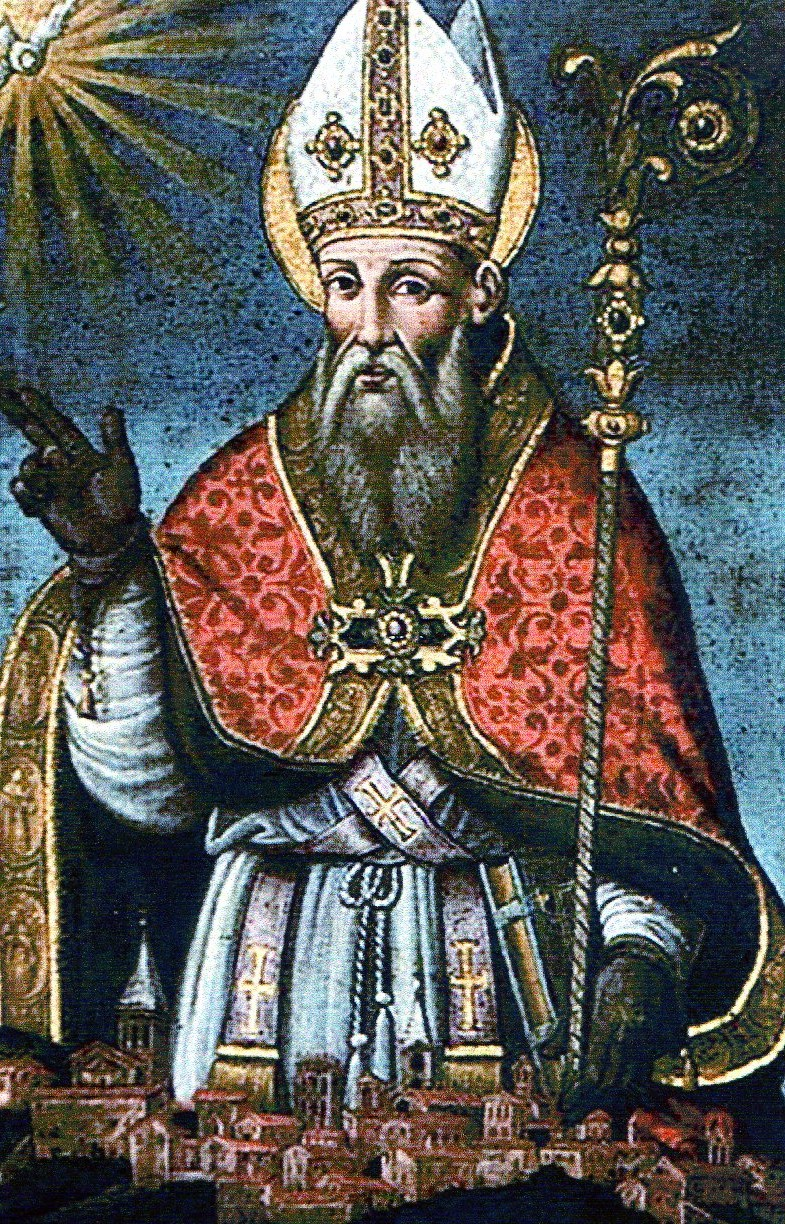
- Died: 537
- Venerated in: Roman Catholic Church
- Major shrine: San Fortunato, Todi
- Feast: 14 October
- Patronage: Todi

Saint Fortunatus (died 537) was a 6th-century bishop of Todi. According to tradition, he defended Todi during a Gothic siege. He is the patron saint of Todi.

== Life ==
Fortunatus came to Italy from Poitiers as a hermit. Because of his miracles and ability to cast out demons, in 528, he was urged by the clergy and the people to become bishop. His predecessor, Callistus (c. 502-28), had been killed by the Goths. The first cathedral was the church of Sant'Ilario.

Fortunatus saved the city from being sacked by the Ostrogoths. He converted many and destroyed a temple to the god Pan, and used the materials to build a church. Fortunatus consecrated the church of San Fortunato, where his bones are preserved. A Benedictine monastery was attached to it in the 11th century. The altars to Fortunatus and Cassianus of Imola were consecrated by Pope Innocent III in 1198.

Fortunatus was praised by Pope Gregory the Great, who called him a man of great virtue who took great care in attending to the sick. Gregory, born around the time Fortunatus died, was greatly interested in Fortunatus' life. Gregory writes, "A certain poor old man was brought to me –because I always love to talk with such men- of whom I inquired his country, and hearing that he was of the city of Todi, I asked him whether he had known Bishop Fortunatus. He said he knew him very well. 'Then I beseech you,' said I, 'tell me whether you know of any miracles that he did, and, since I am very desirous to know, explained to me what manner of man he was.'"

== Veneration ==
The church of San Fortunato in Todi is dedicated to the saint and holds his relics. The first building was as a Palaeo-Christian temple of the 7th century. In 1292, the Franciscans began a new Gothic edifice with a "hall" structure. The crypt houses a sepulcher containing the relics of Fortunatus and other saints, as well as the tomb of Jacopone da Todi.

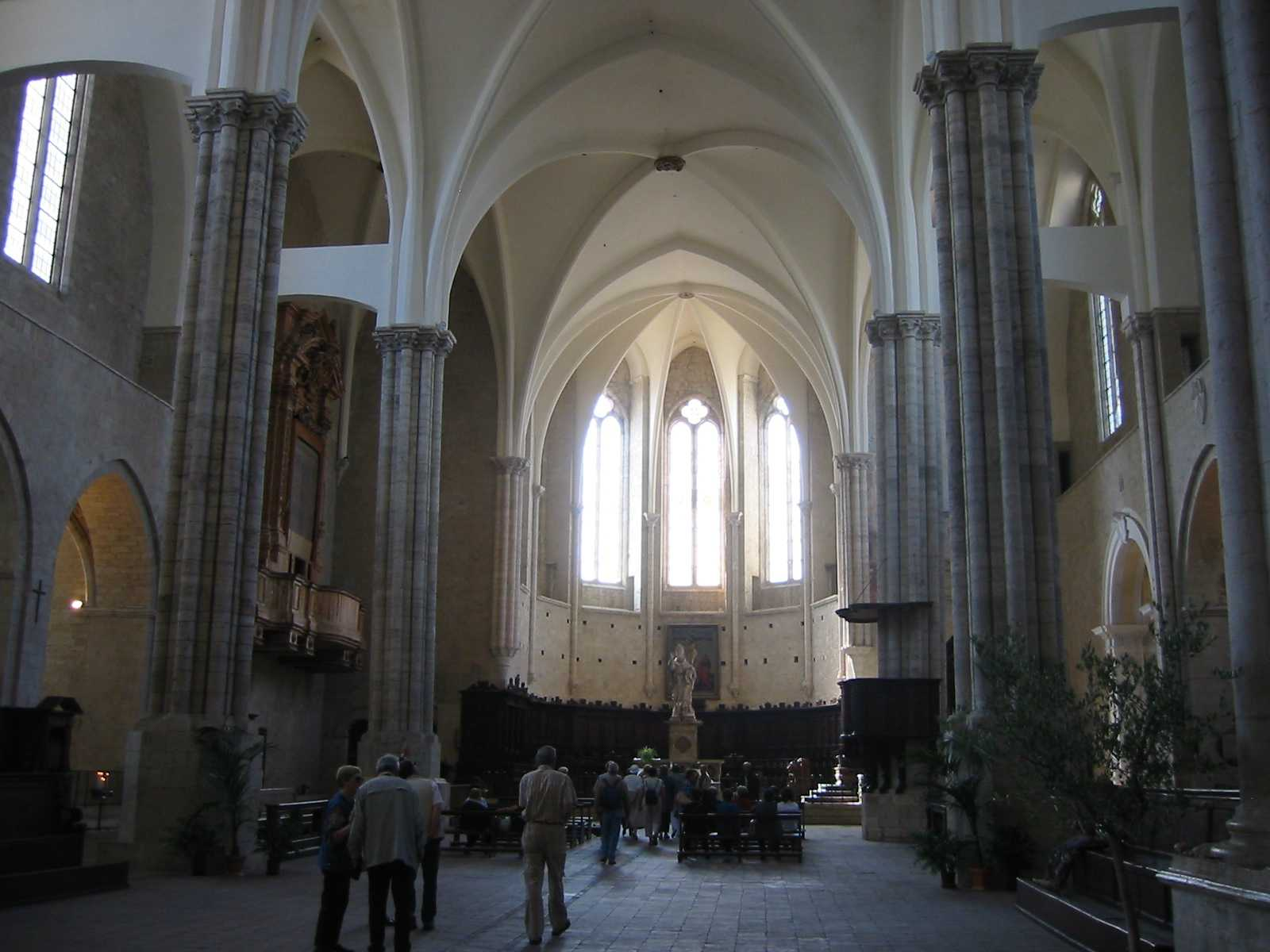
Church of San Fortunato, interior

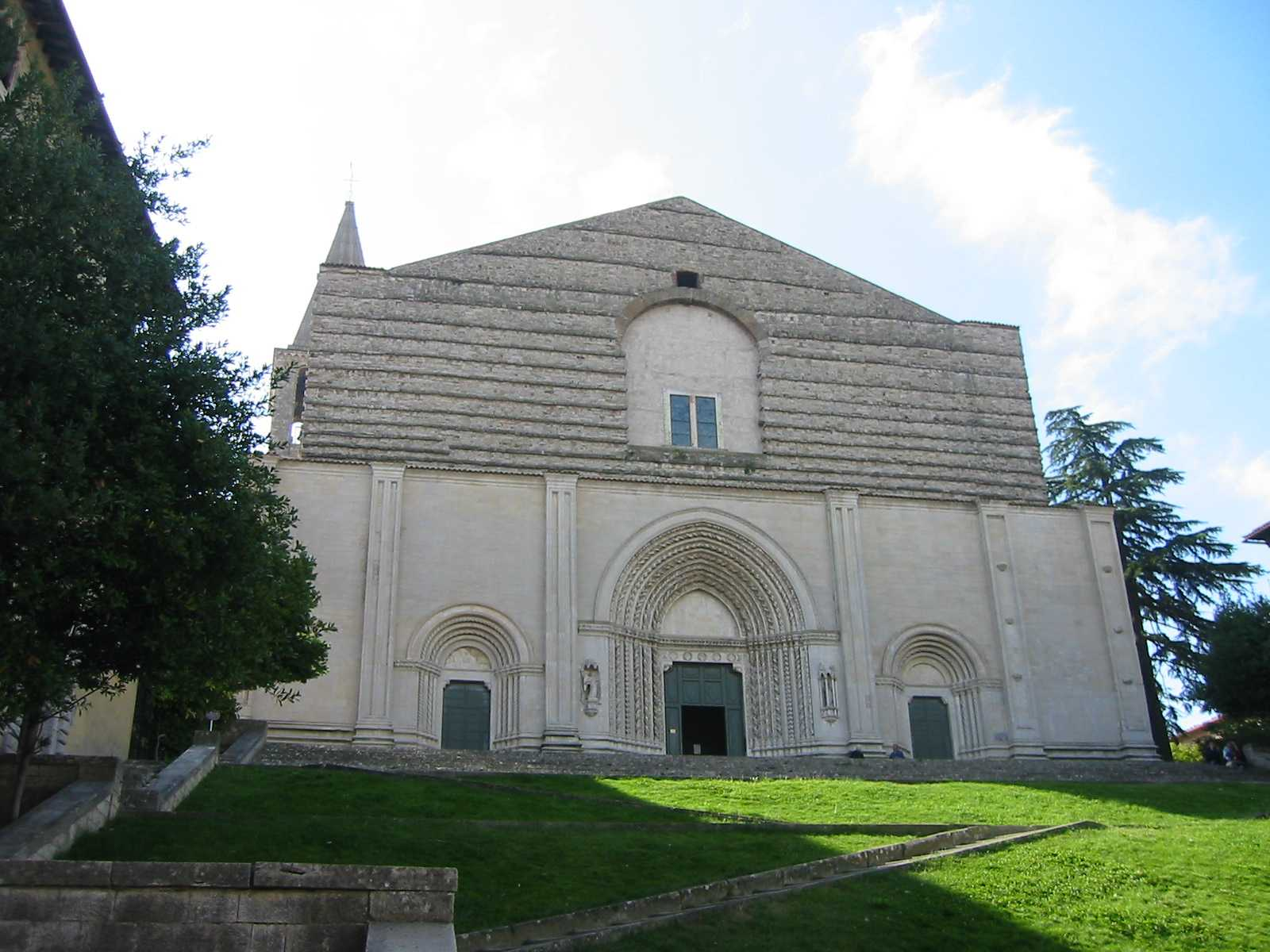
Church of San Fortunato, facade
