= Bartolomeo Barbiani =

Italian painter

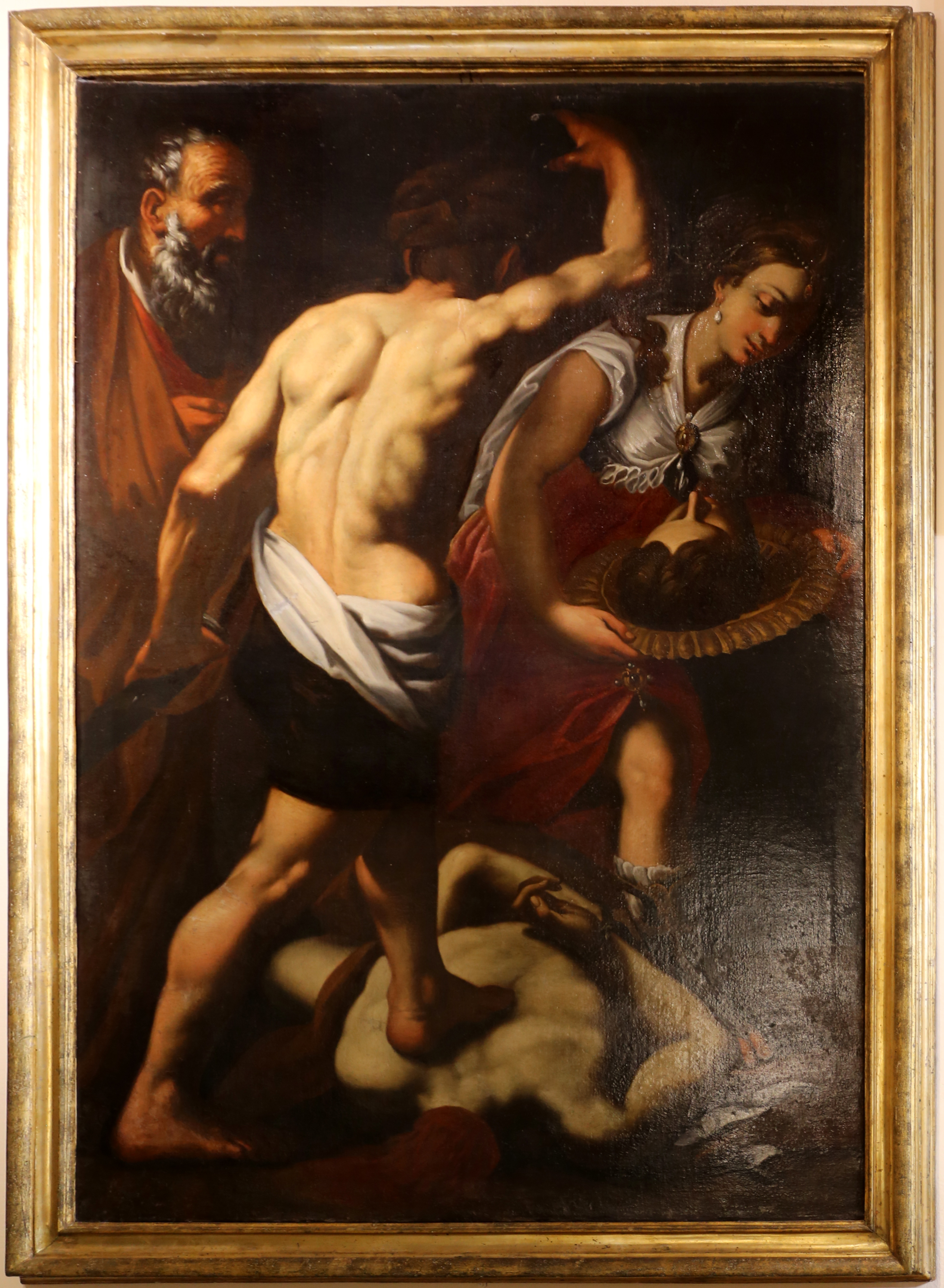
Beheading of St. John the Baptist, Montepulciano Civic Museum

Bartolomeo Barbiani (1596–1645) was an Italian painter of the Baroque period, active in Umbria.

He was born in Montepulciano, but appears to have painted mainly in Umbria. He was a pupil of Antonio Circignani (Pomarancio). He is documented as painting for the following churches:

- Santa Monica, Amelia (1642)
- San Nicolò, Montecastrilli (1639)
- San Michele, Stroncone (1628)
- Sant'Antonio, Todi (1642)
- Sant'Ilario, Todi (1640)
- San Silvestro, Todi
