= San Giuseppe dei Falegnami, Todi =

Church in Umbria, Italy

Coordinates: 42.779242°N 12.407201°E

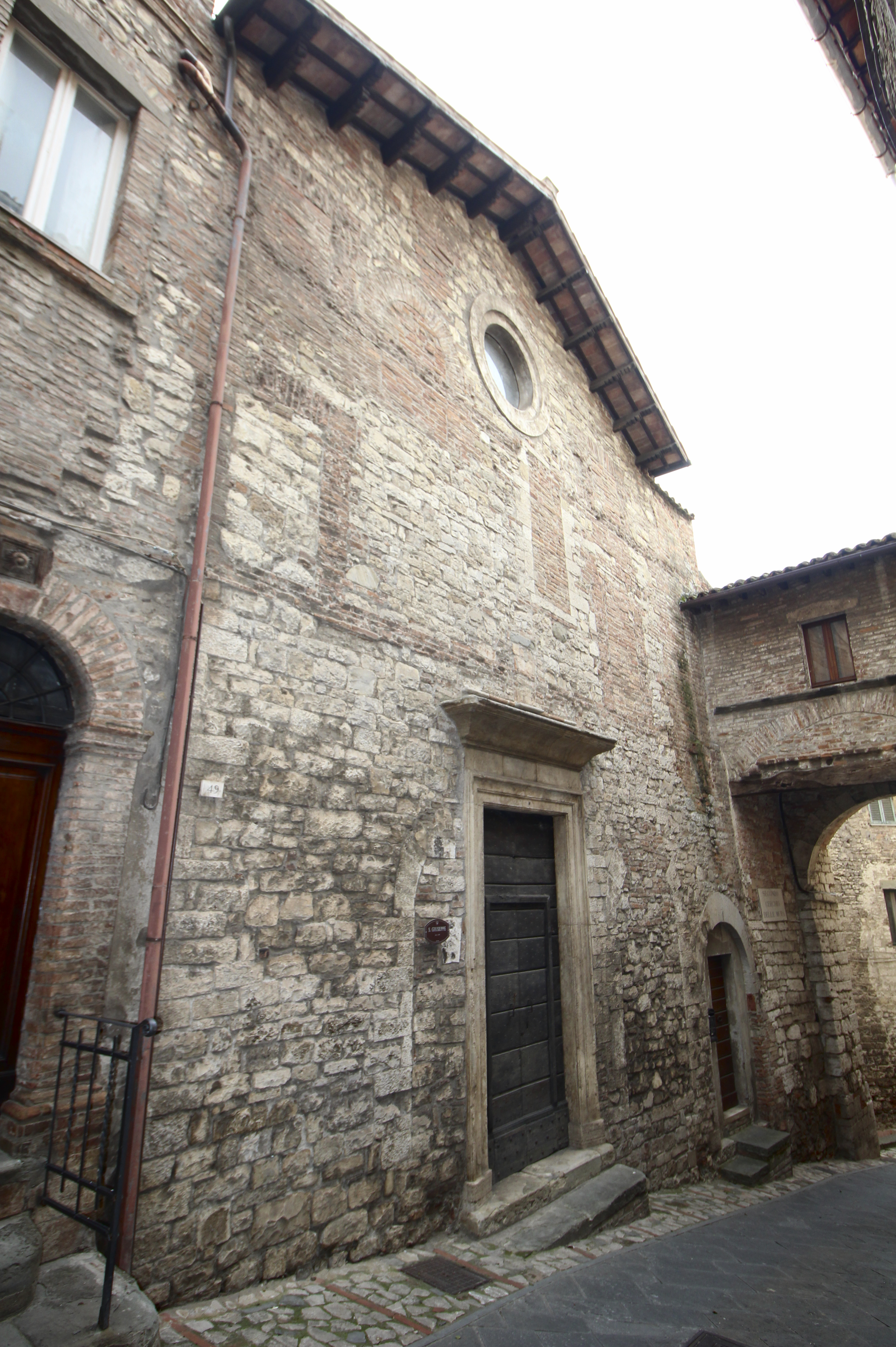
San Giuseppe dei Falegnami

San Giuseppe dei Falegnami is a small Baroque-style Roman Catholic church or oratory located at the corner of Via San Giuseppe and Via di Mezzo Muro in the historic center of Todi, within the province Perugia, in the Umbria region of Italy. The church was commissioned by the guild of carpenters and furniture-makers, who traditionally regarded Saint Joseph as their patron. Although the guild had been present in Todi since 1282, the church was not constructed until 1612. The main altar, which depicts the Holy Family with Joseph the carpenter (1623) was painted by Andrea Polinori.
