= San Fortunato, Todi =

Roman Catholic church in Umbria, Italy

Coordinates: 42°46′49.05″N 12°24′21.06″E

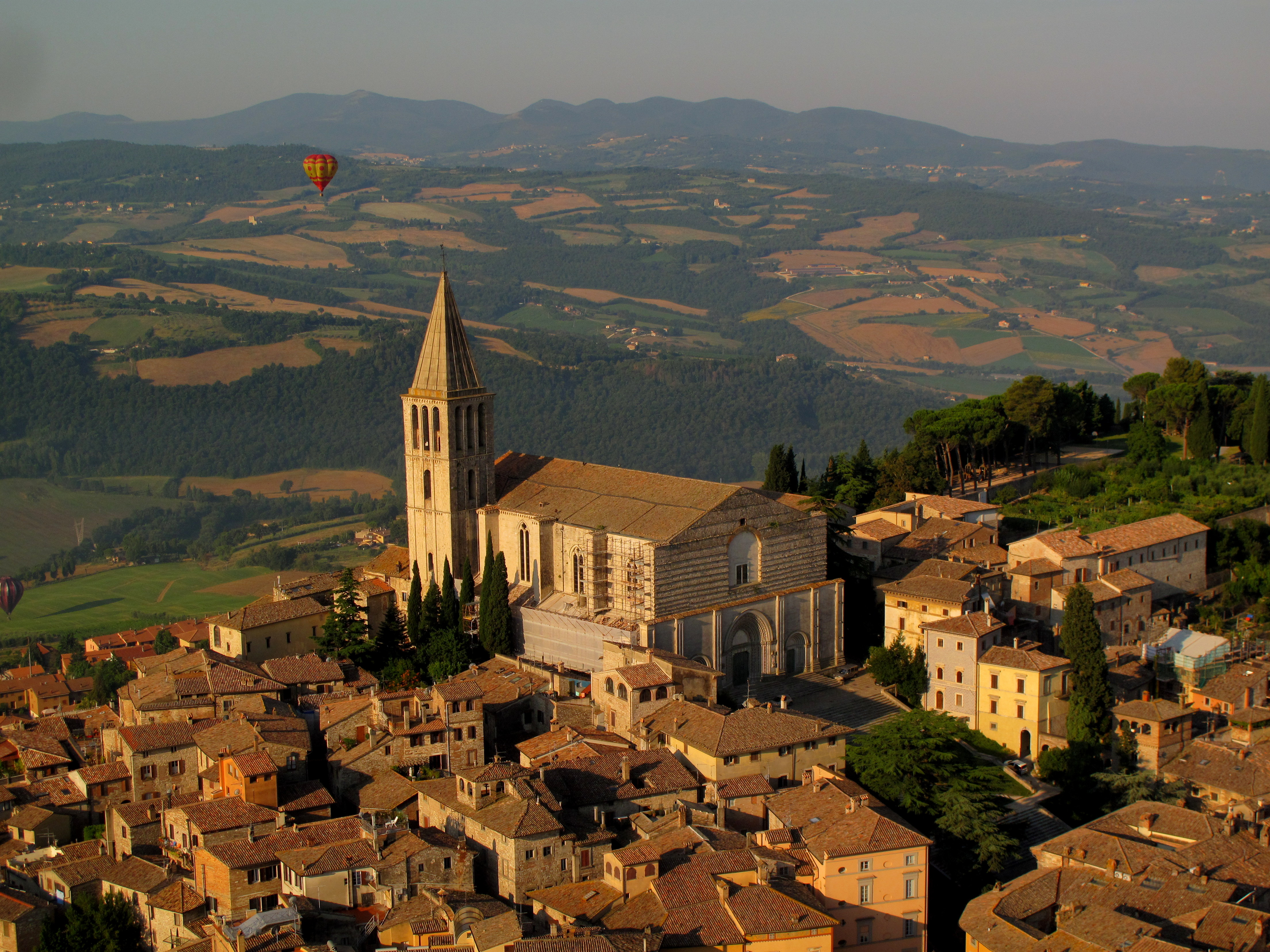
Church seen from above town.

San Fortunato is a Gothic- and Renaissance-style, Roman Catholic church located on Piazza Umberto I #6 in the historic center of Todi, province of Perugia, region of Umbria, Italy.

== History ==
The church was built likely at the site of an ancient Roman hill-top temple. It later hosted a shrine to the early Christian martyr San Cassiano; however, the possession of the relics of Saint Fortunatus of Todi (6th century bishop) provided the church with a saint of more later origin. A Benedictine monastery became attached to the church by the 1100s, and the church was expanded, creating altars dedicated to the Saints Fortunato, Cassiano, and John the Baptist, consecrated by Pope Innocent III in 1198.

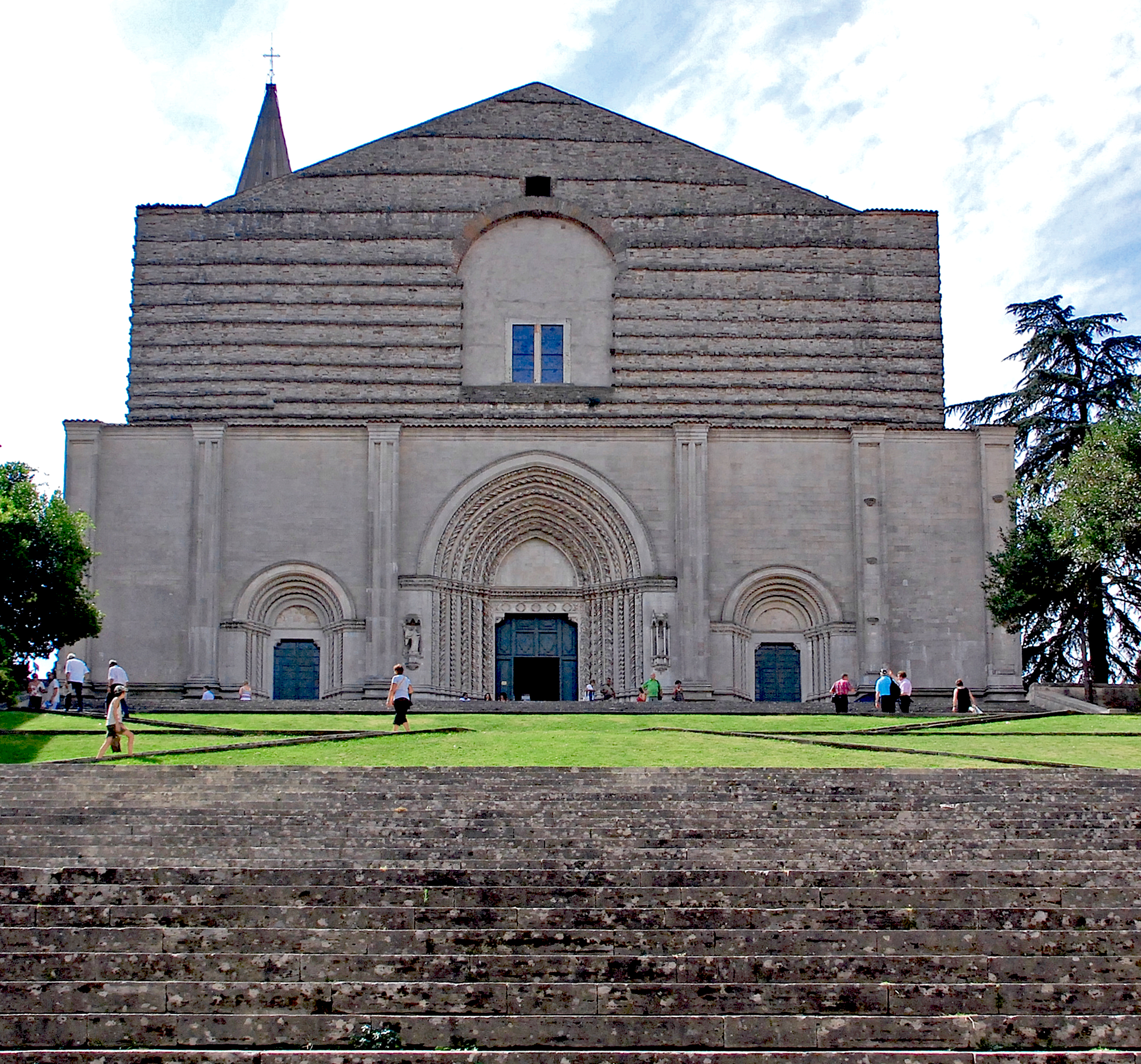
Facade with access staircases.

The church was acquired by the Franciscan order by 1292, and led to the construction of the present church building. Only the lower portion of the facade was faced in polished stone; the rest remains in bare brick. The facade was designed in the first half of the 15th century by Giovanni di Santuccio of Firenzuola. Built from 1295 to 1460, the church has a Gothic-style central portal (1415–1458) with a pointed arch, with richly decorated spiraling pilasters, sculpted with leafy and animal details, and depictions of saints and apostles. The sculptures flanking the portal, ensconced into small stone baldachini (tents), depict the Angel Gabriel and the Virgin of the Annunciation, and are attributed to followers of Jacopo della Quercia. Above the wooden doors, the presently blank stone tympanum once held a mosaic. The church stands on a raised platform and the facade is preceded by a broad series of stone steps.

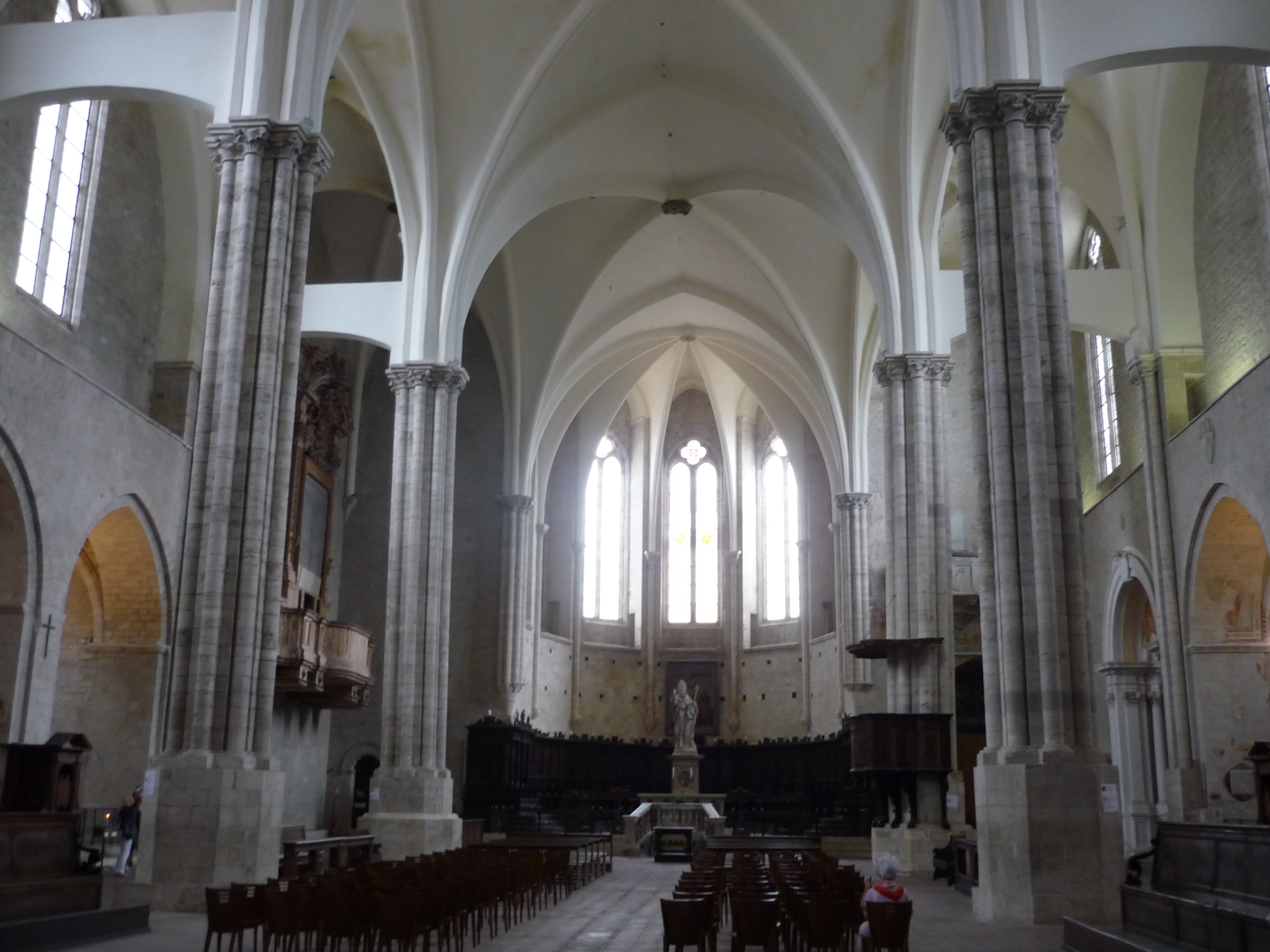
Interior towards apse with gothic tracery.

The interior has a nave divided from the aisles by compound piers. The vault displays gothic tracery, and the apse has tall lancet windows. The campanile, modelled on that of the Franciscans’ mother church in Assisi, was completed by 1460.

The main altar rises before a semicircular apse, well lit by windows. Along the walls are carved wooden choir stalls. On the back wall, in the center, is an altarpiece depicting a Crucifixion with St John and the Virgin (1590) by Pietro Paolo Sensini. In front of this is a large marble statue of San Fortunato on a high pedestal putatively added in 1643 as a votive offering when the city was spared sacking during the first War of Castro. The altar was made in the 16th-century deriving the present columns from an older altar. The bishop Angelo Cesi excavated a crypt below the altar to house the relics formerly in the prior altar. The saints depicted between the arches were painted (1861) by Luigi Sabatini.

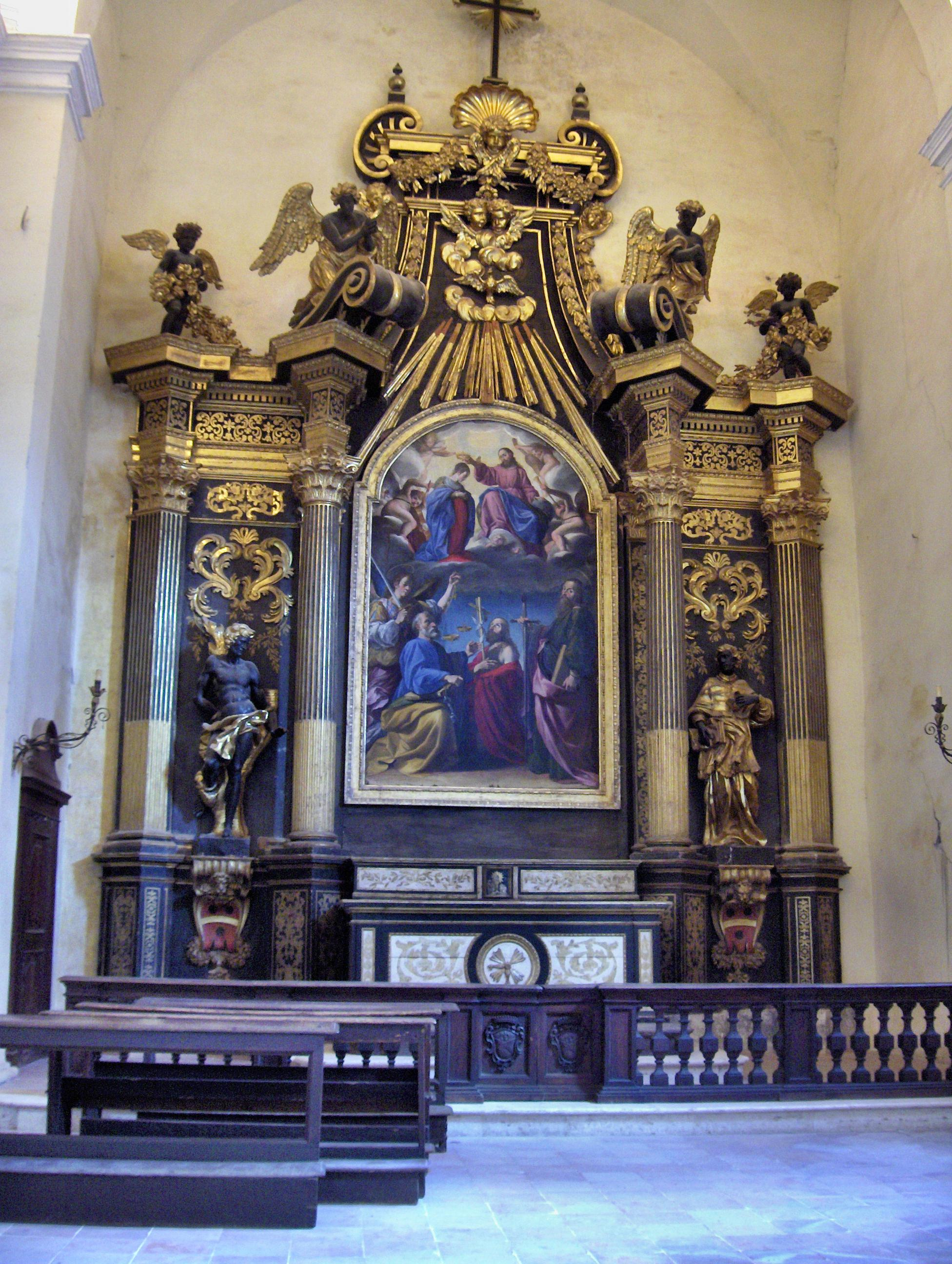
Coronation of the Virgin by Polinori

The third chapel on the right has a monument to the lawyer Vincenzo Caroccio (died 1623). The fifth chapel on the right has a tomb monument dedicated to Paolo Rolli (1687 – 1765), a writer and translator. The third chapel has a fresco fragment moved here from elsewhere in the church painted (1432) by the Florentine Masolino da Panicale. It depicts the Madonna and child between angels. In the 6th chapel to the right, dedicated to St Francis, the Astancolle family commissioned a series of frescoes (circa 1340) from a follower of Giotto. At the end of the nave, the Cappella Gregoriana has an altarpiece depicting the Coronation of the Virgin (1618) by Andrea Polinori. Some damaged frescoes depicting a Madonna (circa 1400) were painted by Niccolò di Vannuccio.

At the end of the left nave, the Cappella dell'Assunta (Chapel of the Assumption) has an altarpiece depicting the Miracle of the Assumption of Mary (1618) also by Polinori. Surrounding the painting is an altar rich in polychrome marbles. On the left nave, in a glass case is a silver reliquary once holding the arm of Fortunatus. Tradition holds that the original reliquary was stolen in 1328 during an Italian campaign by the emperor Louis of Bavaria.

There is also a San Fortunato church in Covignano, province of Rimini.

== Gallery ==
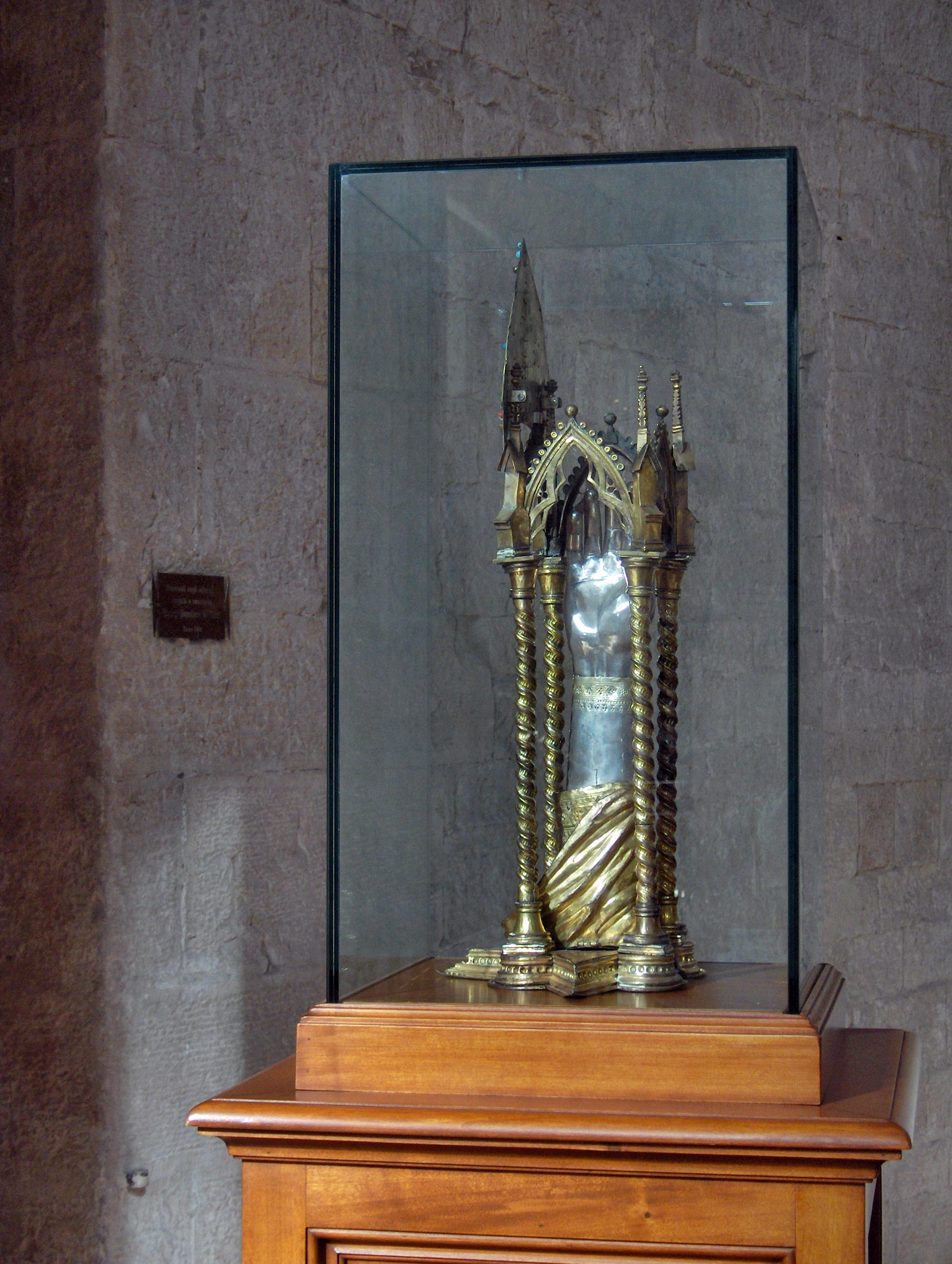
Reliquary of arm of San Fortunato

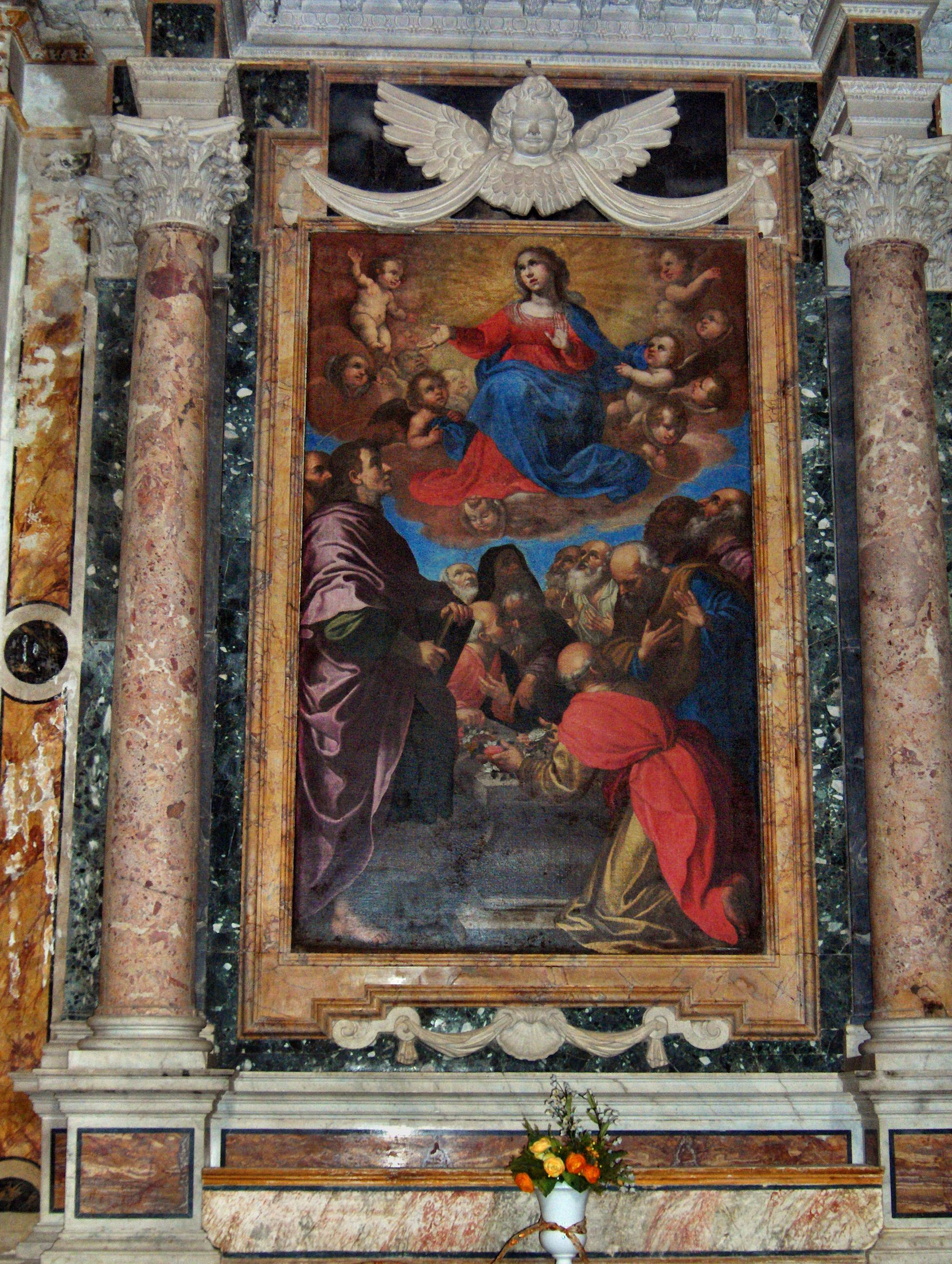
Assumption of the Virgin

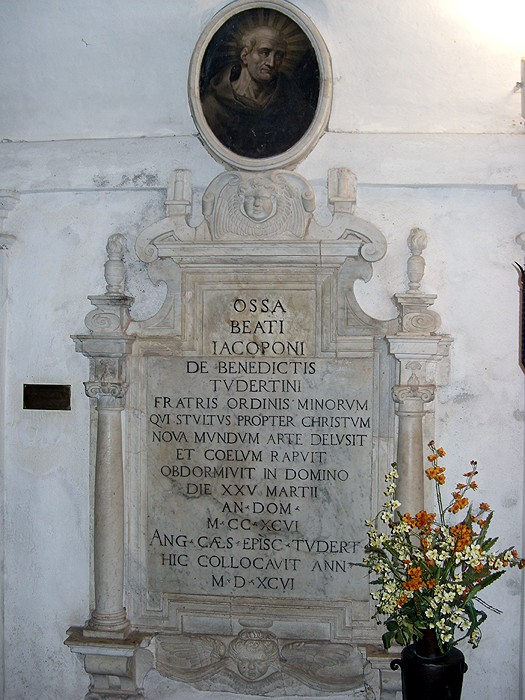
Tomb of the Blessed Jacopone

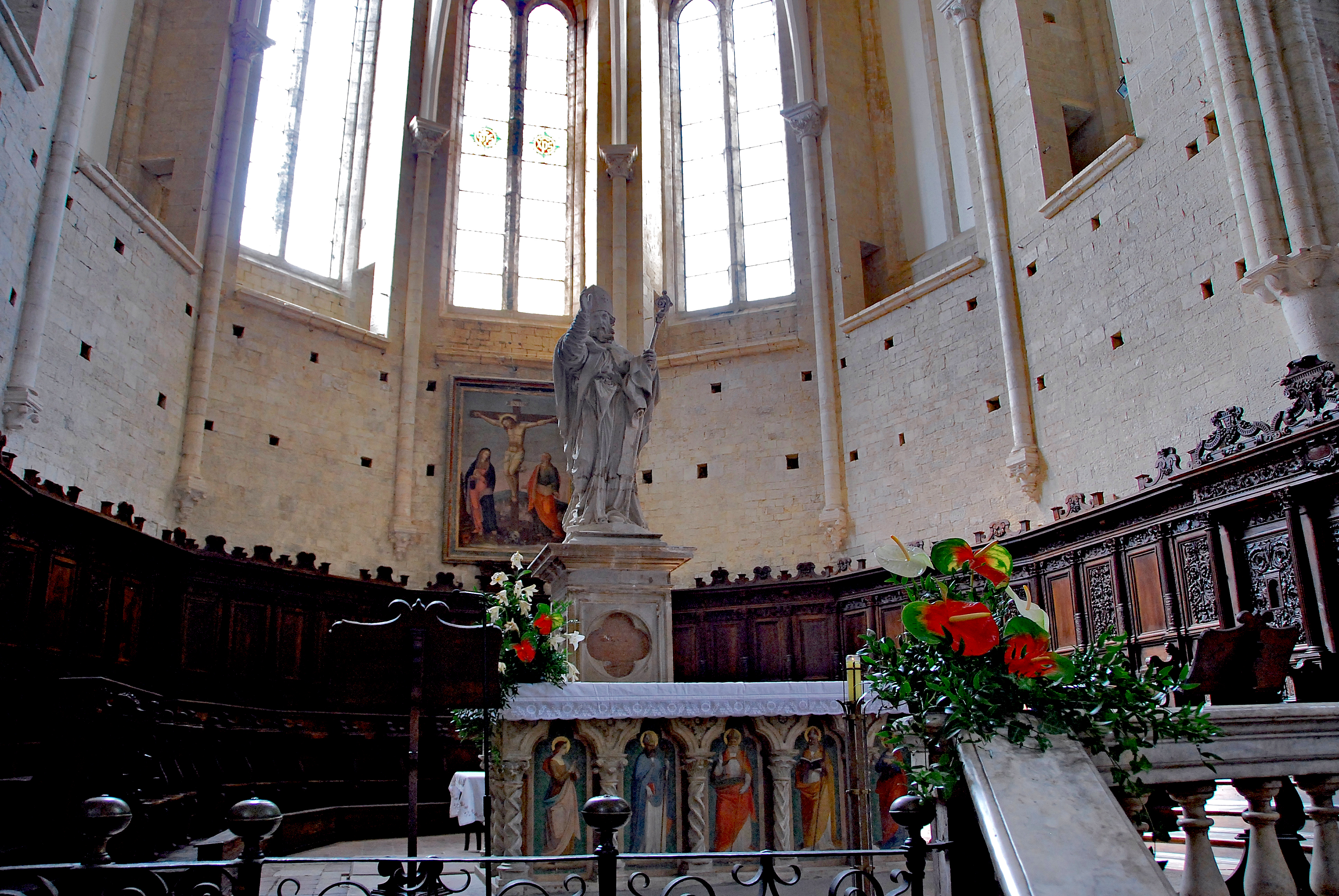
Apse and main altar
