= Sant'Ansano, Spoleto =

Church building in Spoleto, Italy

Coordinates: 42.435883°N 12.441331°E

Sant'Ansano is a neoclassical-style, Roman Catholic church located in the town of Spoleto, in the province of Perugia, region of Umbria, Italy.

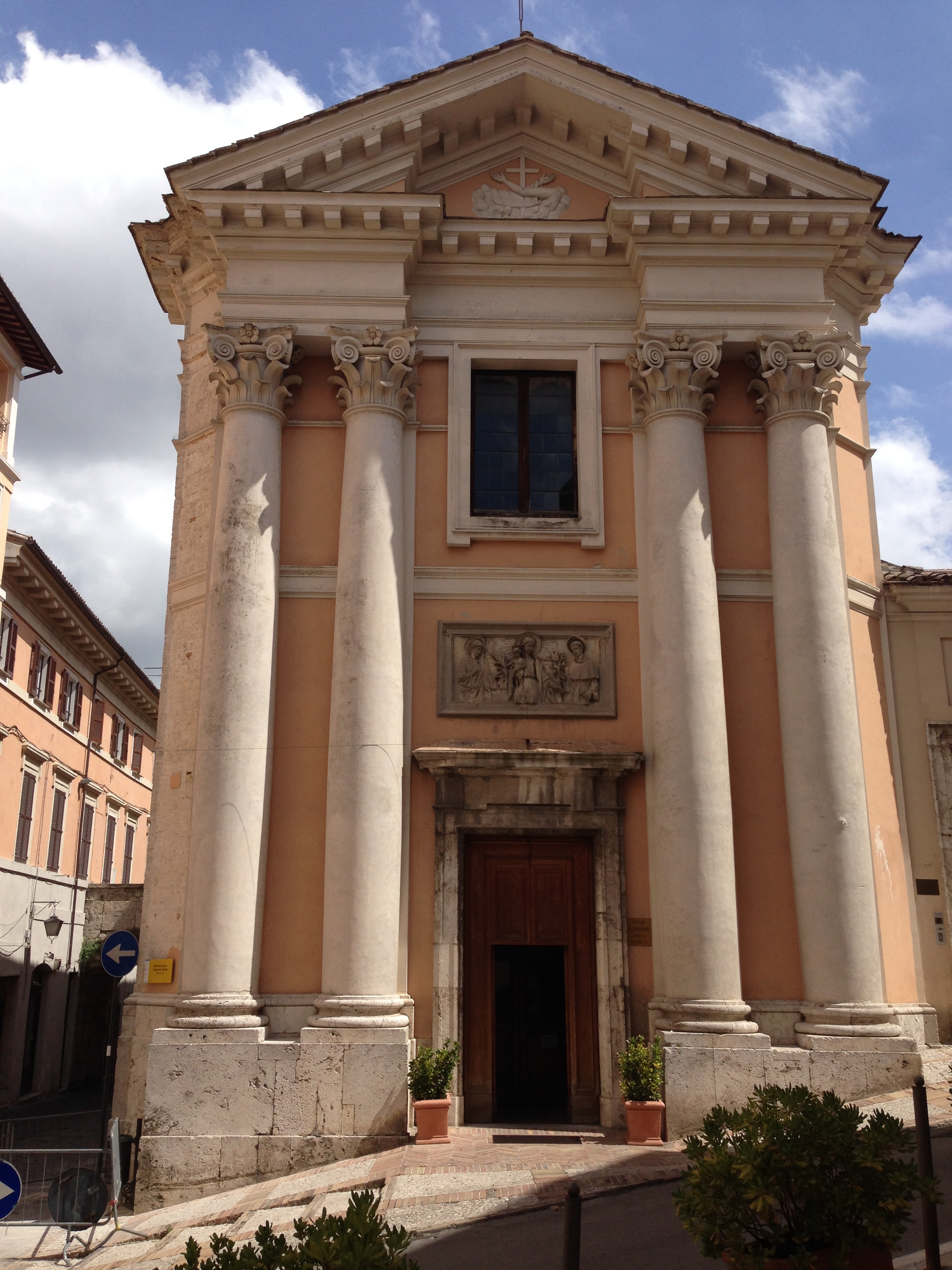
Facade of Sant'Ansano

== History ==
A church at the site had been built around the tomb of St Isaac, a Syrian eremitic monk who supposedly came to a mountain around Spoleto in the 6th century. The present church was built in the late 1700s by the Milanese architect Antonio Dotti.

Inside are housed a fresco depicting the Madonna and Child and two Saints by Giovanni di Pietro, also called Lo Spagna and a main altarpiece depicting the Martyrdom of St Ansano by Archita Ricci.

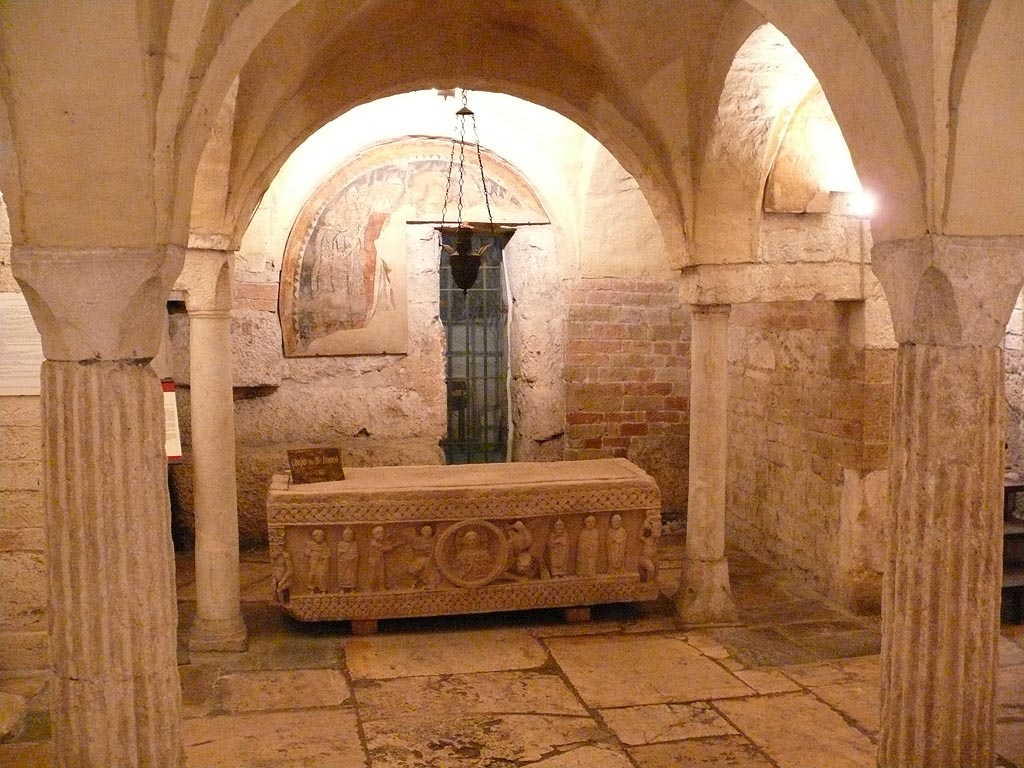
Crypt of Sant'Isacco with replica of Sarcophagus and columns derived from prior Roman temple

The Crypt of Sant'Isacco below the church was likely previously a ground-level, ancient Roman temple, upon which a church was built above. St Isaac of Monteluco was putatively a fifth century Syrian hermit, who established a community of hermit-monks in nearby Monteluco. The crypt has romanesque-style, sculpted capitals (8-9th century) atop ancient Roman columns. It may in fact have been an original ground level pagan Roman temple. It also has some 11th-12th-century restored frescoes.
