= Archita Ricci =

Italian painter

Archita Ricci (Urbino, 1560–1635) was an Italian painter active in Umbria, including Perugia, during 1599–1622.

== Biography ==
The church of Sant'Ansano of Spoleto has a main altarpiece depicting the Martyrdom of Saint Ansanus by Ricci. The portrait of the envoy Hasekura Tsunenaga of Japan near Pope Paul V, commissioned to Ricci in 1615 for the cardinal Scipione Borghese, was found at Rome's Palazzo Borghese. In the Church of San Nicolo in Montecastrilli in Umbria, Archita Ricci painted the Last Supper in 1602.
