= San Nicolò, Montecastrilli =

Church in Montecastrilli, Italy

Coordinates: 42°38′52″N 12°29′01″E

San Nicolò is a Roman Catholic church located in the town of Montecastrilli, in the province of Terni, region of Umbria, Italy.

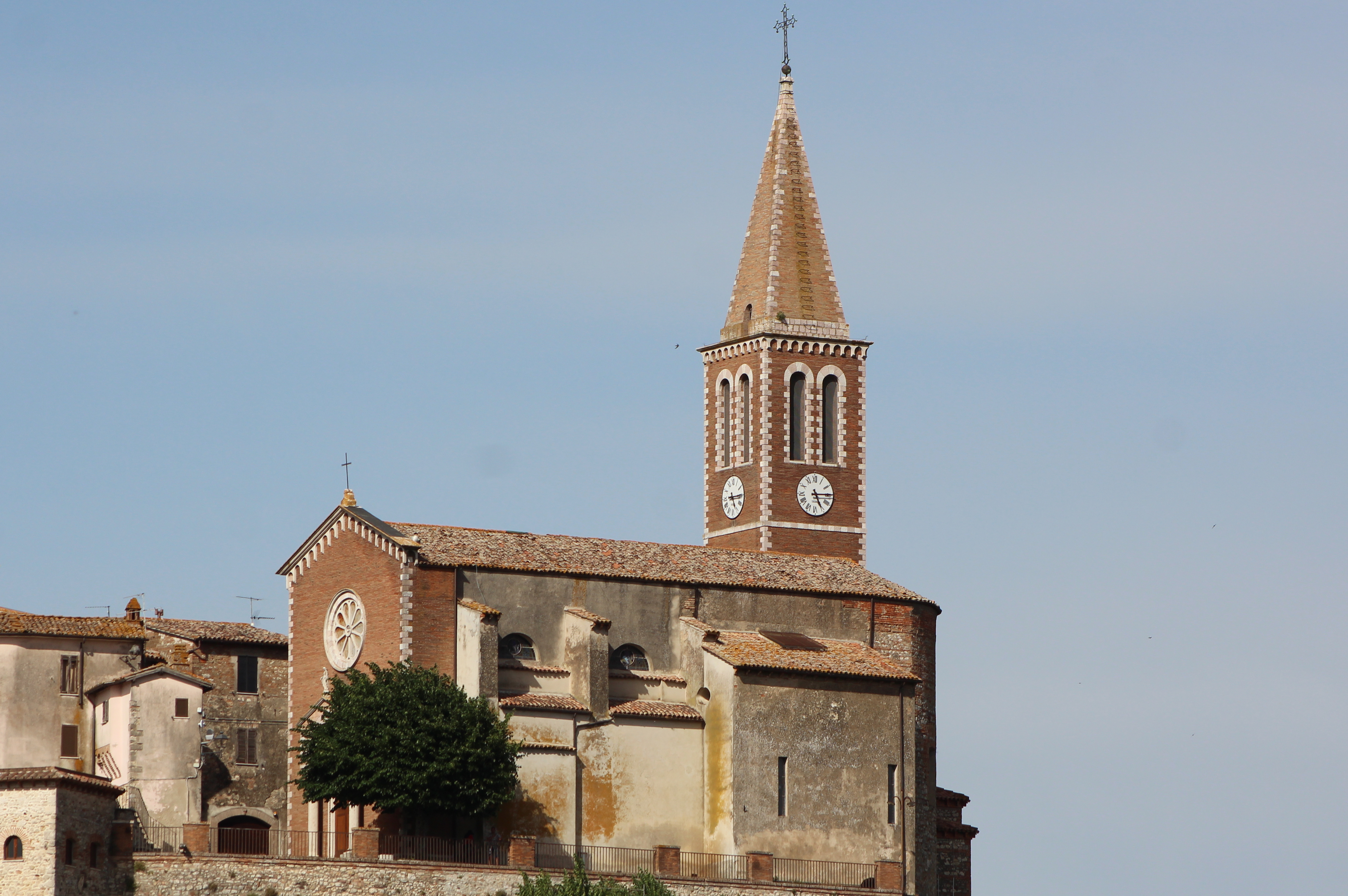
The church of San Nicolò in Montecastrilli

== History ==
A church was present at the site since the 10th or 11th century. The present church with a Latin cross layout houses a Last Supper (1602) by Archita Ricci da Urbino. Thirteen panels in the chapel of the Holiest Rosary are attributed to Andrea Polinori; two are nineteenth century works. The chapel houses a Madonna of the Rosary (1606) also by Ricci. An altarpiece depicting Saints Anthony and Lucy (1629) in the chapel dedicated to the saints, was painted by Bartolomeo Poliziano.

The left transept houses a painting of the Madonna of the "Refugium Peccatorum" (late 1500s) transferred here from the suppressed parish church of Castelfranco. The baptismal font is dated 1578.
