= Sant'Antonio Abate, Todi =

Church building in Todi, Italy

Coordinates: 42.779761°N 12.409156°E

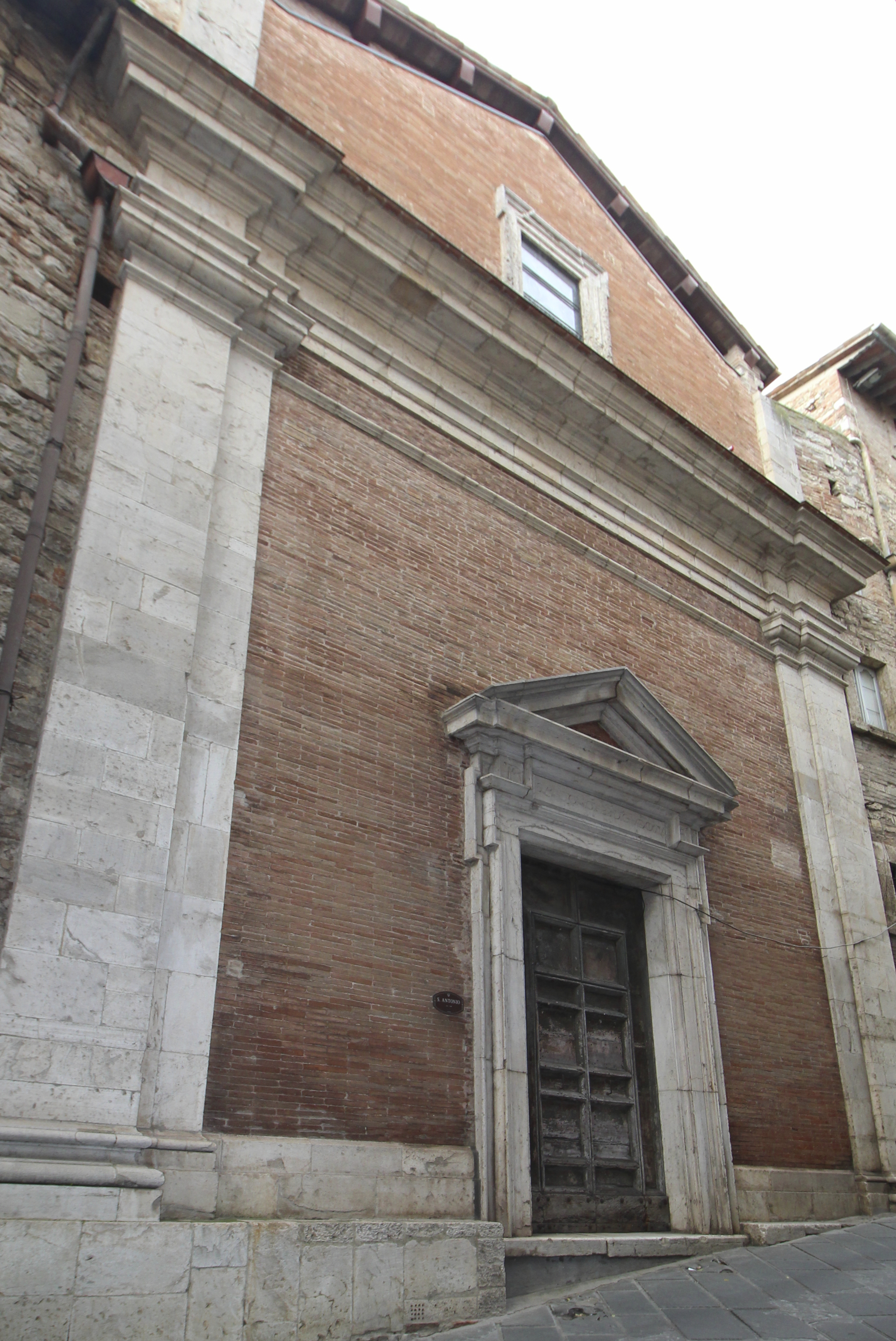
Sant'Antonio Abate in Todi

Sant'Antonio Abate is a small Baroque-style, Roman Catholic church or oratory located at the corner of Via Roma #46 in the center of Todi, province of Perugia, region of Umbria, Italy. The oratory was built in the early 17th century, in association with a hostel of pilgrims by the guild of the shoemakers. The main altarpiece (1619) depicts St Anthony Abbot, patron saint of animals, standing below a Madonna and child, was painted by Bartolomeo Barbiani. Most of the walls and ceilings are frescoed, and it includes works by a young Enrico Quattrini.
