= Nunziatina, Todi =

Chapel in Todi, Italy

Coordinates: 42.783764°N 12.406009°E

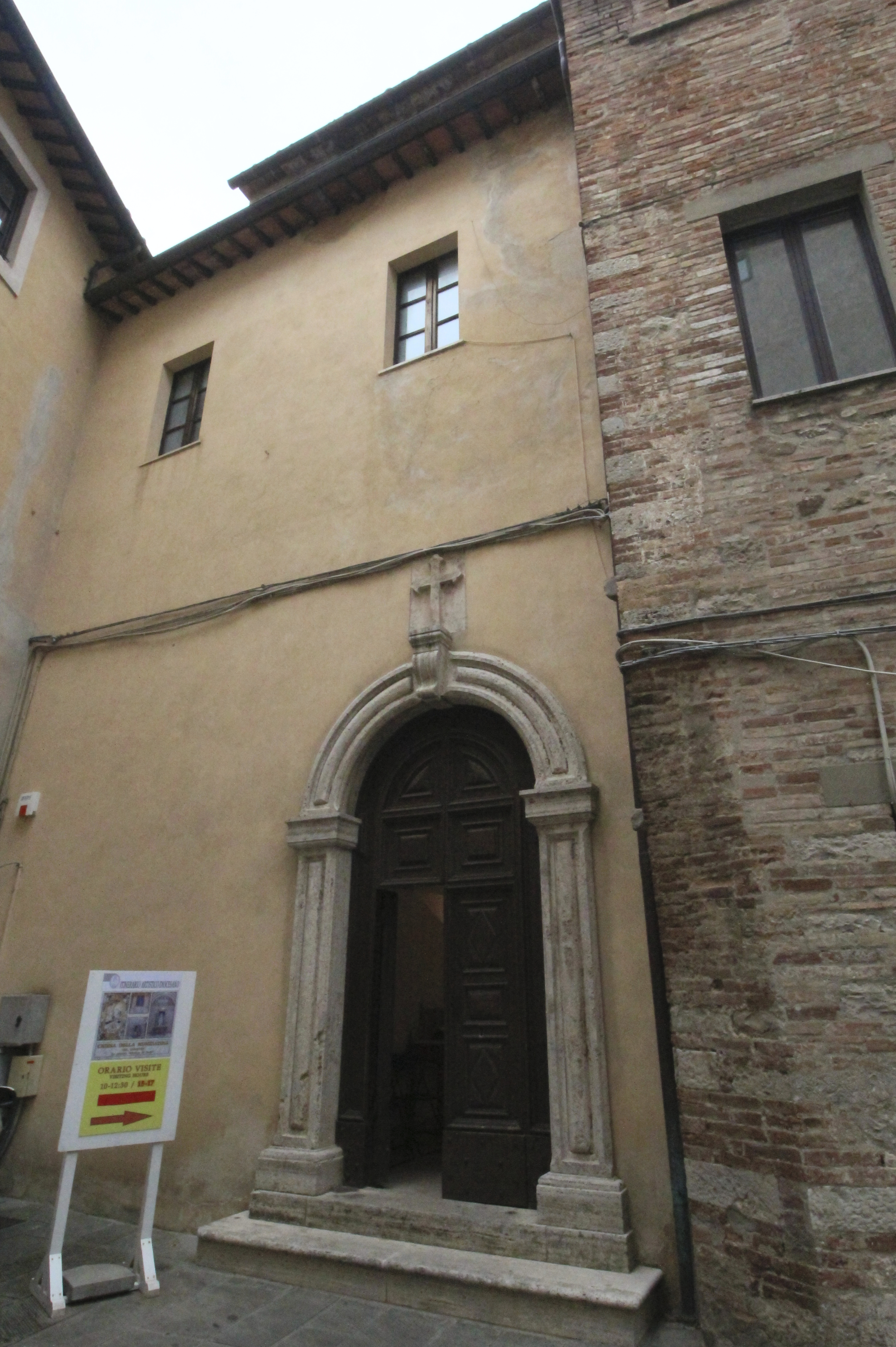
Entrance to Chiesa della Nunziatina

The Nunziatina is a Baroque-style, Roman Catholic oratory or small church at the north end of Via del Seminario, near the Todi Cathedral, in the center of Todi, province of Perugia, region of Umbria, Italy.

== History ==
The oratory was founded in the 17th century through a gift of land by the Bishop Angelo Cesi, to a local confraternity of the Santissima Annunziata, which had been active since the 13th-century. The confraternity was putatively involved in ministering to passing pilgrims. Over the years, the prayer hall was enriched with frescoes and paintings. Putatively a former paneled ceiling was destroyed in a fire in 1700. Among the paintings present now are works by Andrea Polinori, including a 1627 depiction of Jacopone da Todi.
