= San Carlo, Todi =

Church in Todi, Italy

Coordinates: 42.781486°N 12.408470°E

San Carlo, formerly Sant'Ilario is a small Romanesque and Gothic-style, Roman Catholic church on Viale San Carlo and intersection with Via Cesia and della Piana, below the Piazza del Mercato Vecchio, in the center of Todi, province of Perugia, region of Umbria, Italy.

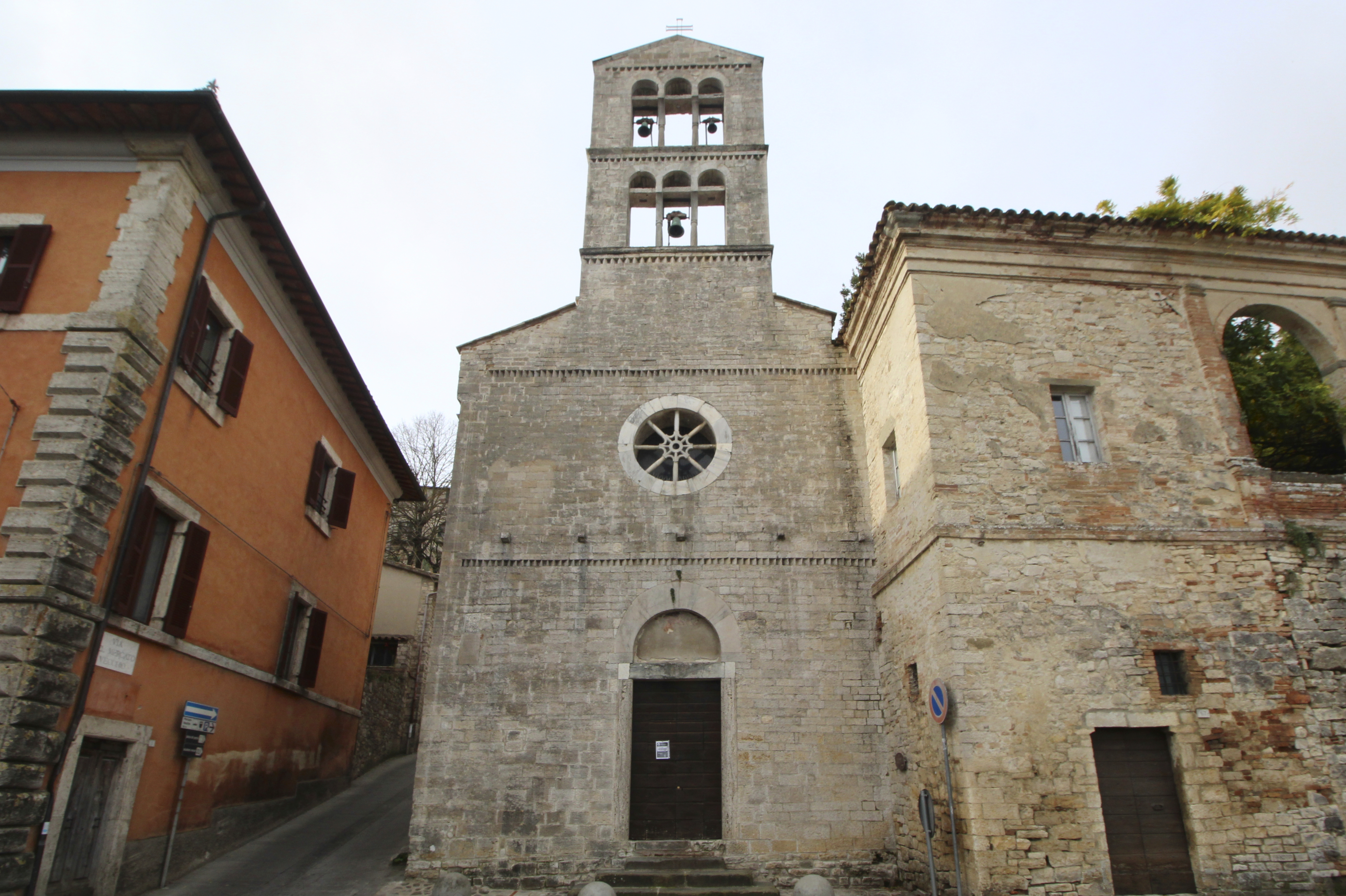
The church San Carlo in Todi

== History ==
The church is ancient, and was previously known as Sant'Ilario. By 1112 we have documentation of a church belonging to the Benedictine Abbey of Farfa. A stone at the left of the entrance recalls a consecration in 1249. In 1623, the church was granted by the bishop to a Confraternity of San Carlo, where it gained its present name. The austere stone rectangular layout of a single nave, with few windows is accounted for the early Romanesque construction. In the following century, the few added decorations, including the two-story sail-shape bell-casing with mullioned arches as well as the small rose window, exemplify gothic architectural details from the late 12th century. The interior is equally sparse, and best lit through the rose window by the rising sun in the morning. Inside there is a damaged fresco of the Madonna della Misericordia by Giovanni Spagna, and two canvases depicting San Carlo Borromeo and Sant'Ilario. The latter was painted (1640) by Bartolomeo Barbiani.

Proceeding further north along Via Cesia is the Fonte di Scannabecco, built in 1241 as a public urban drinking fountain by the podesta of Todi, Scarnabecco di Fagnani. Destroyed in the past by a landslide, it was reconstructed in the 19th century.
