= Andrea Polinori =

Italian painter

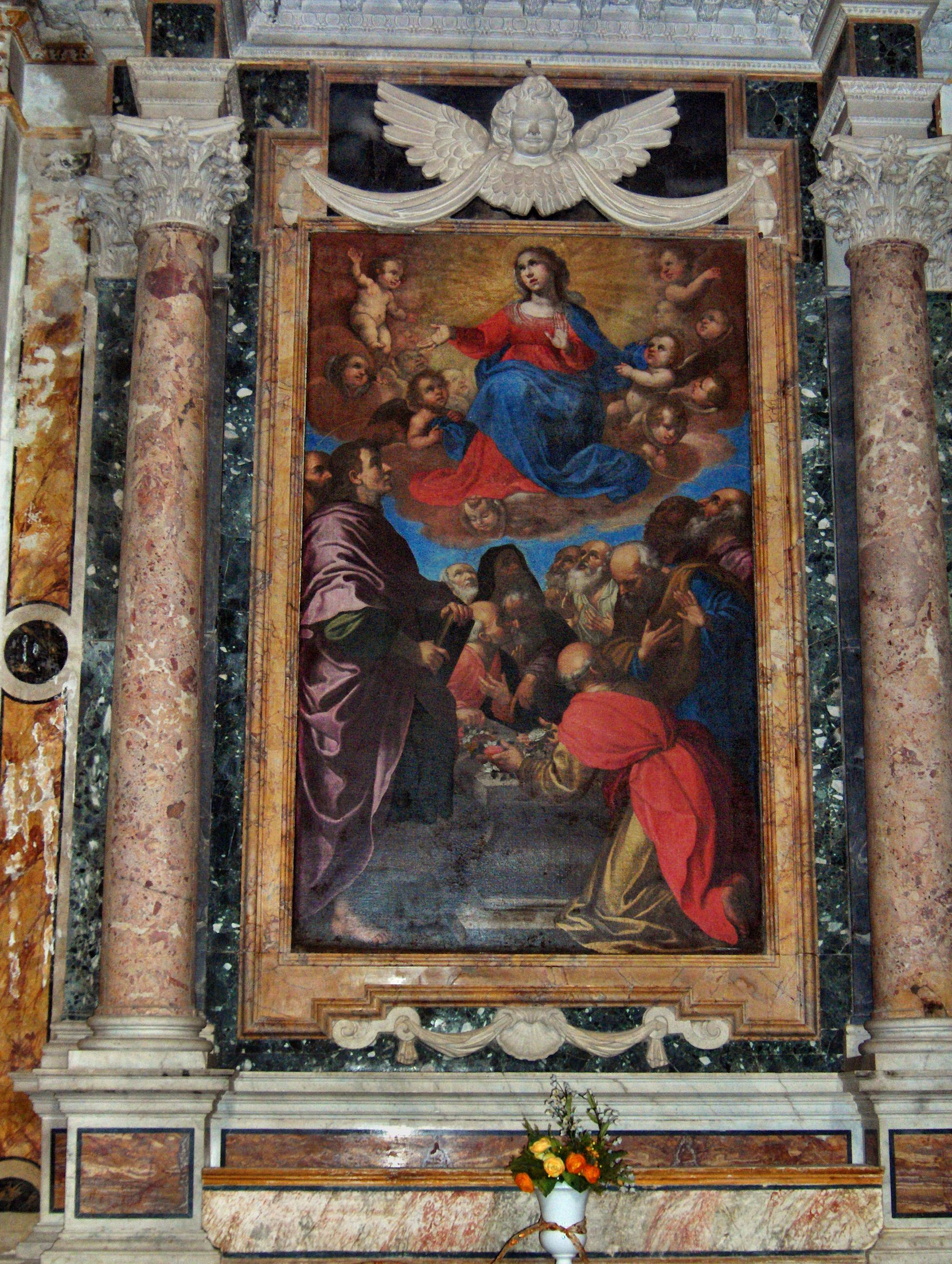
Assunta, San Fortunato, Todi

Andrea Polinori (1586 – 1648) was an Italian painter active in a Baroque-style mainly in his native city of Todi in Umbria.

== Biography ==
He was born in Todi. He spent a formative period circa 1615 in Rome. He is described as leading an intemperate life. His brother, Giovanni Antonio Polinori, was also a painter. In Todi, he painted for the churches of San Francesco (1535, 1642), San Fortunato, San Silvestro, San Giuseppe dei Falegnami, Nunziatina, and Santa Margherita (1642).
