= Lipari Cathedral =

Roman Catholic cathedral in Lipari, Italy

Lipari Cathedral Basilica concattedrale di San Bartolomeo
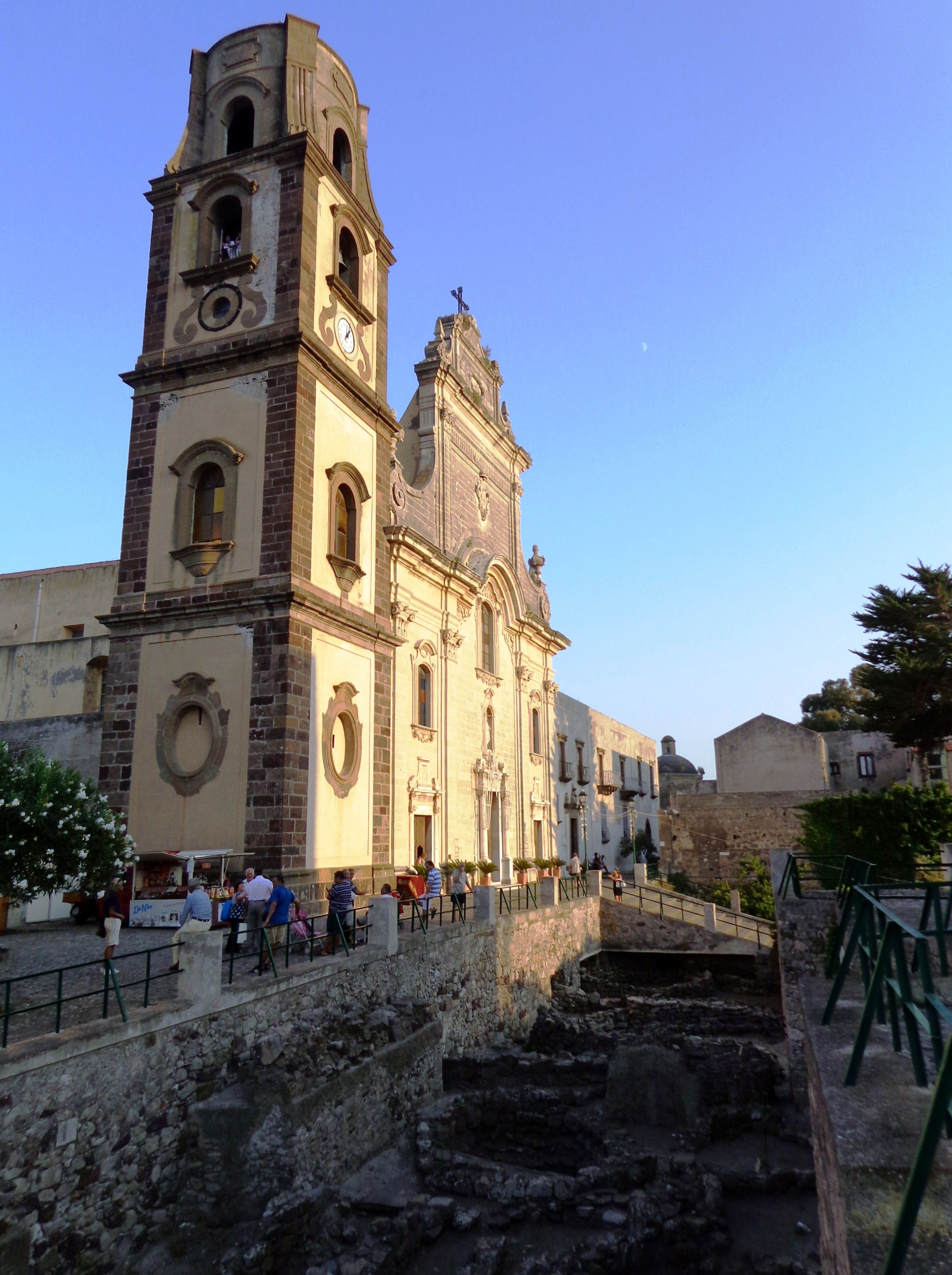
- Facade of San Bartolomeo

Religion
- Affiliation: Roman Catholic
- Province: Archdiocese of Messina-Lipari-Santa Lucia del Mela
- Region: Sicily
- Rite: Roman Rite
- Patron: Bartholomew the Apostle
- Year consecrated: 1131 (original church)

Location
- Location: Lipari
- State: Italy
- Interactive map of Lipari Cathedral; Basilica concattedrale di San Bartolomeo
- Coordinates: 38.46679°N 14.95736°E

Architecture
- Type: Church
- Style: Baroque
- Groundbreaking: c. 1130 (original church)
- Completed: 1515 (current church)

Lipari Cathedral (Italian: Basilica concattedrale di San Bartolomeo di Lipari; Duomo di Lipari) is a Roman Catholic cathedral in Lipari in the Province of Messina, Sicily, dedicated to Saint Bartholomew. Formerly the episcopal seat of the diocese of Lipari, it has been since 1986 a co-cathedral in the Archdiocese of Messina-Lipari-Santa Lucia del Mela.

The church is located in the heart of the citadel with its front facing northwest, at the top of steps leading to the lower city. It is the oldest and largest church in Lipari. It belongs to the Archdiocese of Messina-Lipari-Santa Lucia del Mela, the vicariate of Lipari under the patronage of Bartholomew, the archpriestship of Lipari and the parish of San Bartolomeo.

== History ==
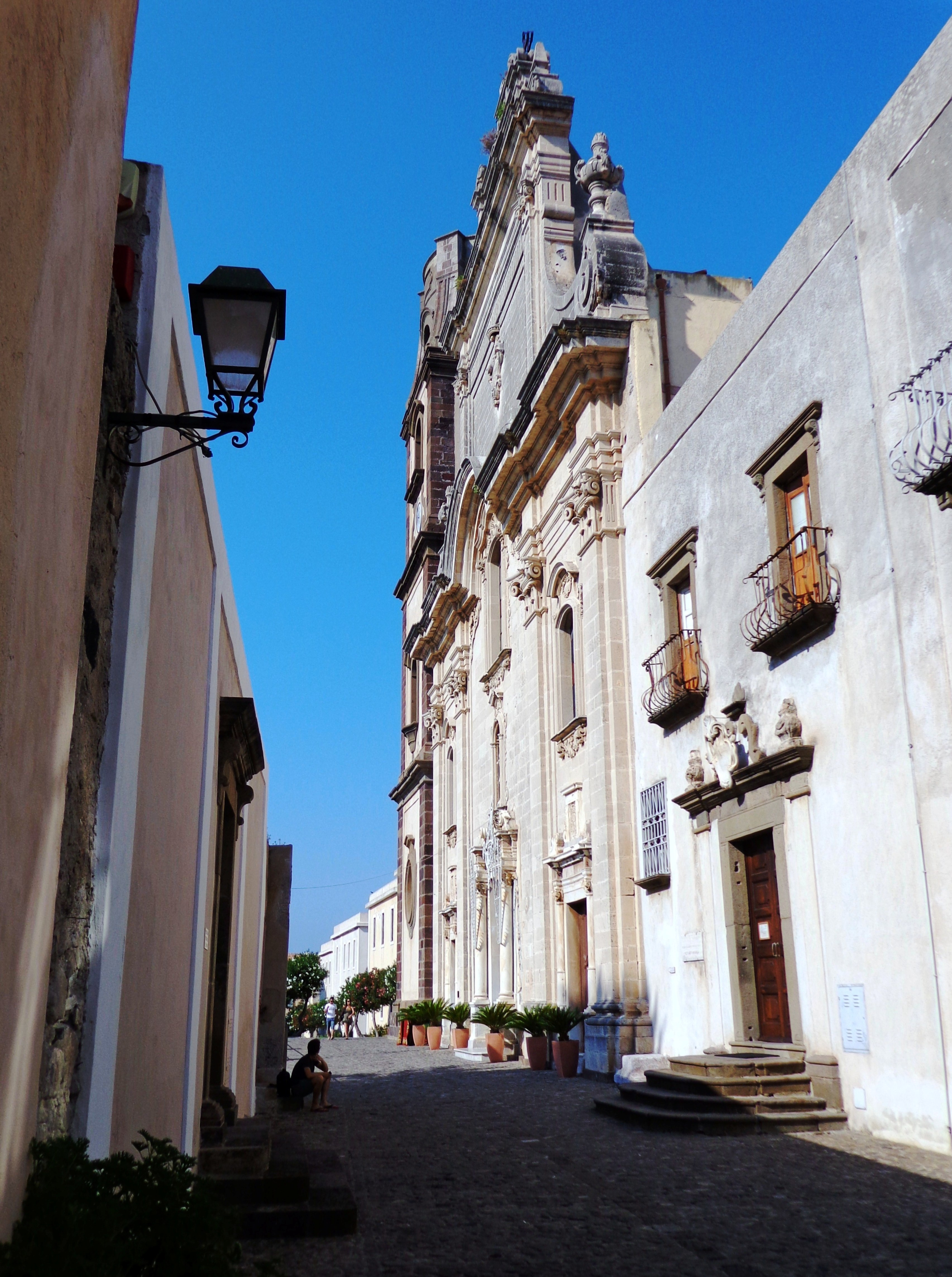
North side facade.

The conversion of the inhabitants of Lipari dates to the middle of the 3rd century AD, from which point a place of prayer has existed on the island. The first cathedral was built in the heart of the acropolis, where a Greek temple had probably existed in the classical period, but it was destroyed by the Arabs in 838.

The original centre of the city is marked by the city walls which run around the summit of the rocky spur which separates two natural harbours and which was very exposed to external attack. The economic, commercial and mercantile centre was located near the Small Harbour (Marina Piccola), where the bishop's seat was based for a brief time before it was transferred to the Citadel on account of frequent attacks. The fortuitous and undocumented recovery of a lead sarcophagus containing the remains of Bartholomew the Apostle allegedly dates to the time of Bishop Agathon Martyr, who interred the remains in a chapel which was initially called "San Bartolomeo extra moenia" and subsequently "Sant' Agatone extra moenia". In this church outside the walls, near the tomb of the Apostle was the sepulchre of Agathon and his successors. Repeated attacks on this area, which accompanied the decline of Roman power in the Mediterranean, led to the construction of a church in a more secure location. The new cathedral was built over the foundations of a pre-existing Greek temple within the fortified upper citadel. The cathedral was destroyed between 836 and 837, when the archipelago was attacked by the army of al-Fadl ibn Yaqub and then by Abu'l-Aghlab Ibrahim ibn Abdallah ibn al-Aghlab, cousin of the Emir Ziyadat Allah. These attacks induced the Lombard Sicard of Benevento to take the relics of Bartholomew away to Benevento for safekeeping.

Reconstruction came only under Roger I of Sicily. The pretext for the invasion and occupation of the island lay in a request for aid by the Emir of Syracuse who was at war with the Emir of Castrogiovanni, but it proved to be the first step in the Norman conquest of Sicily. The return of Catholic control spurred the construction of a series of splendid Norman cathedrals in Sicily, subsequently renovated and repaired as a result of later events (mostly earthquakes). When the Normans settled on the island they found only a few villages of Greek speaking inhabitants in the interior. In 1083, Count Roger I invited the Benedictine monks who were well-fitted for the serenity and security of the place, and built a monastery near the castle for them. The Abbot Ambrogio and his Benedictines built the church and its neighbouring monastery in Lipari, and another pair in Patti. Pope Urban II approved the erection of the monastery and allowed Abbot Ambrogio to finance it with the tithe from Patti. In 1094 the abbey received half the property of the fief of Naso.

On 24 September 1131, Ugone, Archbishop of Messina, promoted the two monasteries of Patti and Lipari to a bishopric, in accordance with a papal bull of Antipope Anacletus II, on account of the large amount of tribute assigned to them by Count Roger. In the same year he consecrated the abbot Giovanni Pergana as Bishop. The official recognition of the diocese by the Holy See followed in 1157. In 1399 Pope Boniface IX (Pietro Tomasello-Cybo), split Lipari and Patti into two separate dioceses, with the consent of Martin I of Sicily, on account of the distance and difficulty of the sea crossing between them. Next to the single naved church, the monastery developed around the cloisters, the first Latin-Norman style cloisters in Sicily. Three of the four original ambulatories were recently brought to light, the fourth has been incorporated into the cathedral and is now its right nave.

The building was expanded between 1450 and 1515 with an artistic trussed wooden ceiling, but was burnt in July 1544 after an attack by the Ottoman corsair Hayreddin Barbarossa. In 1516 Charles V inherited an array of Spanish titles including naples, Sardinia and Sicily and led a campaign against Barbarossa, who retreated to Africa in 1535. After that, reconstruction work began in Lipari: fortifications of the citadel were improved, the cathedral was rebuilt with barrel vaults as a living symbol of the Islanders' Christian faith.

In the course of the eighteenth century frescos with biblical scenes were painted on the vaults. In 1728, the silver statue of the patron Bartholomew was created, as well as the wooden altar to the left of the apse, in thanksgiving for his protection during the 1693 Sicily earthquake, in which Lipari was unscathed. Between 1755 and the end of the century, work was begun on the campanile. In 1772 the cathedral was expanded with two side naves. The right side nave incorporated the north ambulatory of the cloisters. Work also began on the facade of pale Vesuvian stone in 1772, intended to give a delicate contrast and sense of dynamic harmony with the interior of the duomo. In the last decades of the eighteenth century, marble altars decorated with paintings by Antonio Mercurio were added. In 1859 the cathedral was struck by lightning, destroying the gable of the facade and the causing some vaults to collapse. Repair work began immediately and was completed in 1861. The lost ceiling paintings have never been restored.

From its foundation, the cathedral had served as the sole parish church for the entire archipelago. Monsignor Angelo Paino streamlined the pastoral system of all the subordinate churches and secured a decree on 28 October 1910 which instituted the first sixteen autonomous parishes in the diocese, one of which was that of the cathedral.

== Facade ==
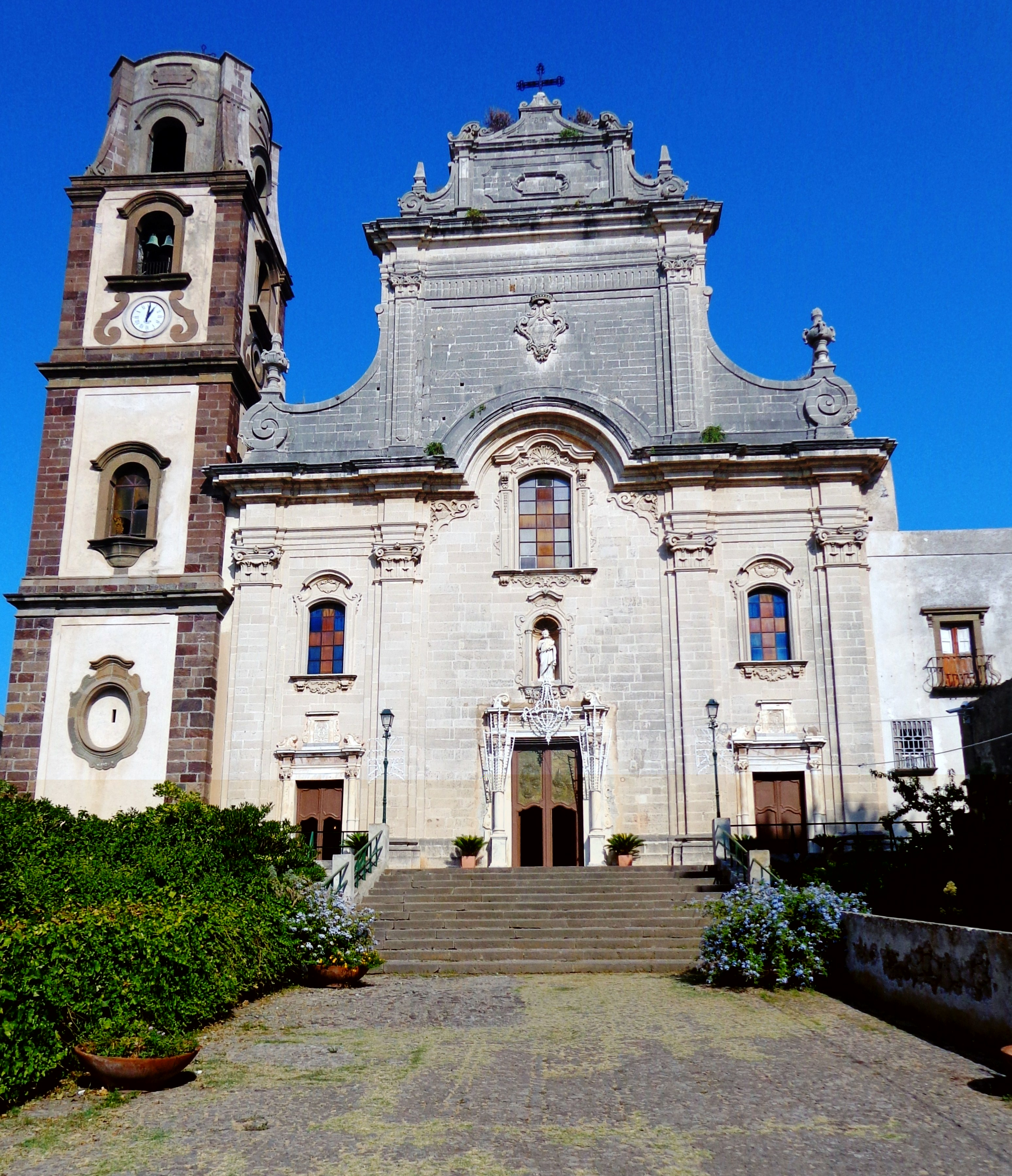
South side facade

The facade is approached by means of a staircase which reveals the proportions of the complex. The church can also be accessed from the Portra Carraia road. The facade has two small side entrances and a central marble portal with Ionic columns surmounted by Corinthian capitals which frame the entrance and support the architrave with a tympanum flanked by two curled volutes. The architrave above the main entrance bears the inscription DIVO BARTOLOMEO DICATUM ("consecrated to the divine Bartholomew). The two side tympana are richly carved and decorated. The side entrances are surmounted by stained glass windows with cornices and an arch above them. In the centre is a niche with a semi-circular conch design, symbolising pilgrimage, which contains a statue of the saint. Above it is another stained glass window with its own tympanum. Four columnar pilasters surmounted by capitals and moulding give a vertical dimension to the appearance and support the upper cornice with its grand central arch.

The upper part of the facade consists of a succession of levels of rectangular blocks of decreasing size, linked to curved volutes at the base of the first and second levels and with volutes in the remaining, upper levels separated by variegated moulding. On the contraforti of the first two levels there are, respectively, vases and truncated pyramidal obelisks. Inside the pediment of the first level (which is framed by pilasters) is the crowned coat of arms with the motto DIVO BARTOLOMEO DICATUM. Inside the second level there is a series of concentric cornices and in the top level there is an inscription reading 1861 - the date of the reconstruction of the upper facade after the lightning strike of 1859. The apex is capped with a wrought iron double cross.

On the left side from the viewer's point of view is the massive square four-levelled bell tower, built between 1755 and c.1800. The uppermost level is cylindrical and joined to the level below with massive curled volutes. Convex pilasters and cornices in volcanic stone frame the first three levels. The first level is marked by a blind oval window, the second by a single arched window, the third by another single arched window above a system of volutes containing a clock on the NW face (on the other faces the clock space is instead an empty window. The uppermost, cylindrical level has single arched openings and inscribed plates.

== Vaults ==
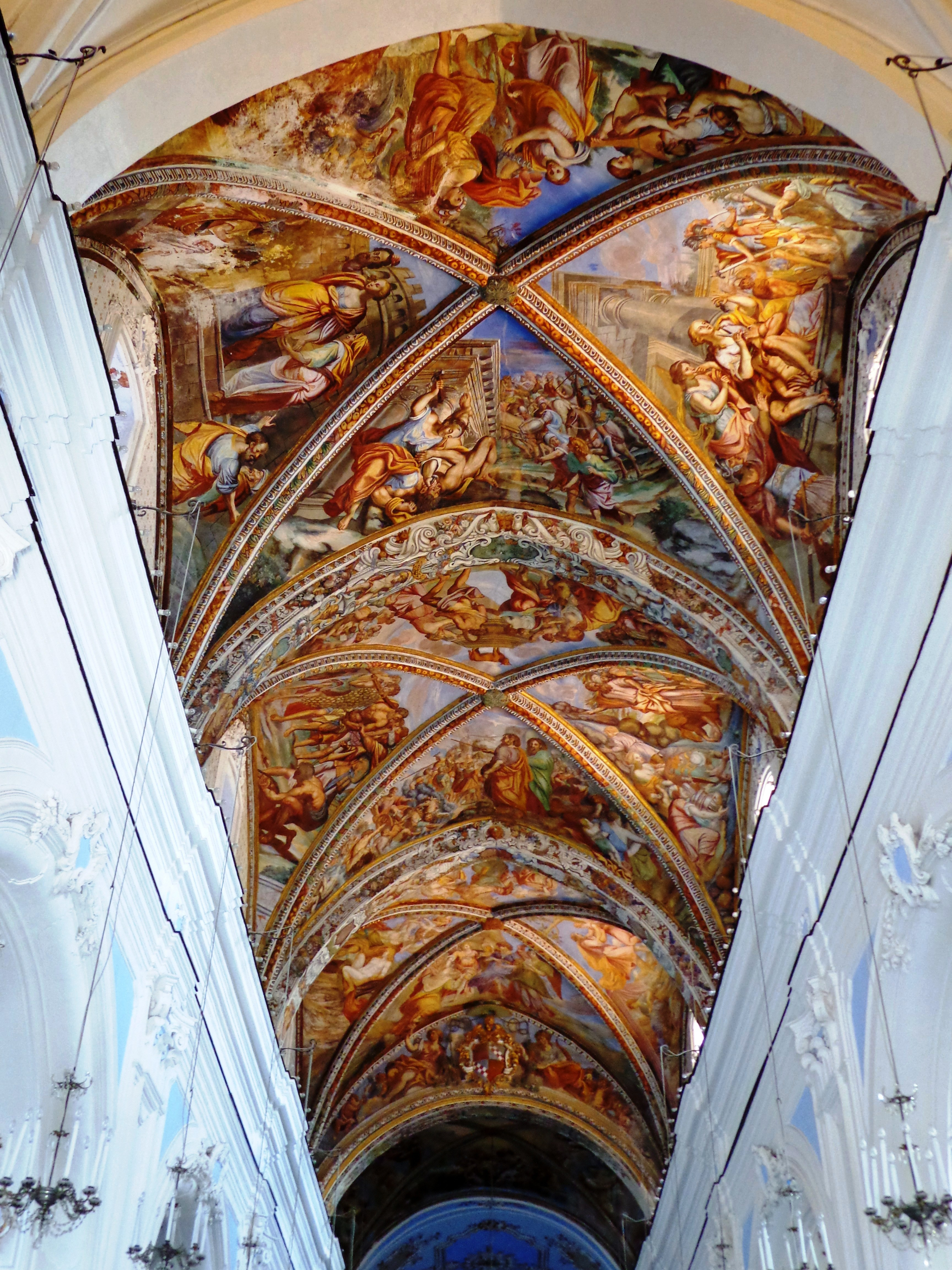
The frescos of the vaults of the central nave.

The central nave was initially covered by a trussed wooden ceiling, then with barrel vaults, and then with a series of groin vaults painted with high-quality frescos of biblical scenes.

- In the quarters of the first vault there are "Science and the Arts," "Samson and Delilah," "Yael and Sisera" and "Judith and Holofernes."
- In the second vault: "The worship of the Golden Calf", "Aaron and the water from the rock," "Moses and the Parting of the Red Sea," and "Manna in the desert."
- In the third vault: "The receipt of the Ten Commandments", "The Expulsion of Adam and Eve from Eden, "The Deluge," and "The Binding of Isaac".

On the triumphal arch at the centre, there is a coat of arms in stucco, between figures and angels, with cardinal decorations and gilt decorations.

== Relics ==
After Barbarossa sacked the church in 1544, the thumbs of St. Bartholomew, which were held in the cathedral, were taken away to Asia Minor. A Spanish merchant acquired them and returned them to Lipari. "Il Vascello" ("the vessel"), or in the local dialect ("U Vascidduzzu"), is a masterpiece of silverwork by Perricone-Marano of Palermo containing 30 kg of silver and 2 kg of gold. According to the oral tradition, this commemorates in occasion after a terrible famine in 1672, when Lipari was struck by a storm, and French vessel agreed to bring some grain and donate the load to the islanders for free. The archbishop Angelo Paino commissioned the reproduction of the providential vessel in honour of the event two centuries later. Inside it is a fragment of St Bartholomew's skin.

== Cloisters ==
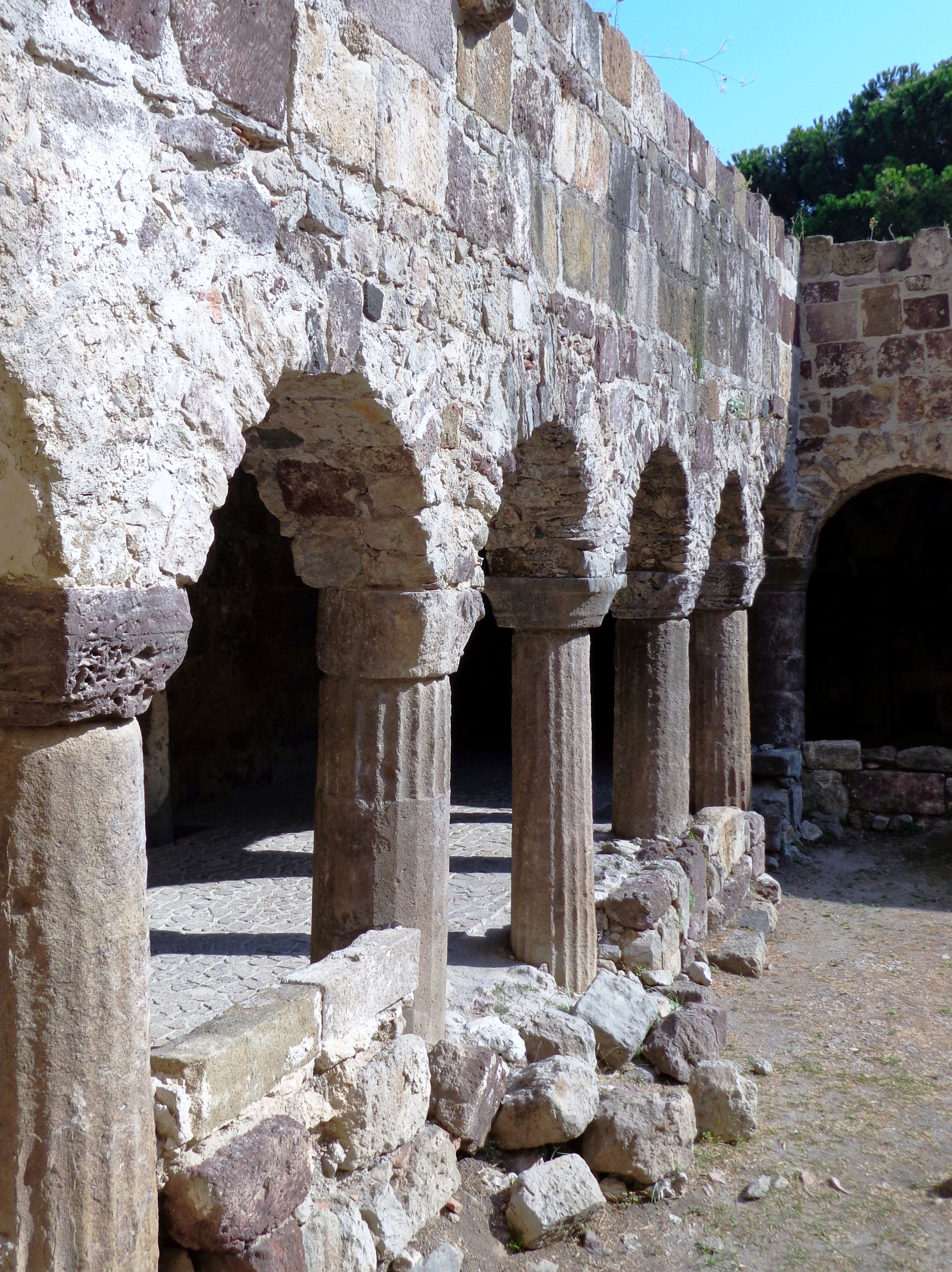
The cloisters

After the Arab Invasions, the island of Lipari remained uninhabited and when the Normans settled there they found only a few villages of Greek speaking inhabitants in the interior. In 1083, Count Roger I invited the Benedictine monks who were well-fitted for the serenity and security of the place, and built a monastery near the castle for them. The Abbot Ambrogio, head of the monks, directed the construction of the Norman cloisters which were completed around 1131 in the reign of Roger II and follow the Clunian Benedictine model. On the original plan, the church faced north and the cloisters south, near the monastery.

After the reconstruction of the church in 1516, the cloister no longer had an important role and was occupied by a cemetery. It was covered over by a landslide during an earthquake and remained hidden for centuries. It has only recently been uncovered, in 1978, by Luigi Pastore who noticed some capitals while investigating the area around the cathedral and immediately informed the Soprintendeze for archaeology and heritage. Today they have been restored and are an important tourist attraction.

Initially the cloisters were square, but the north side was shorted. In the centre, a garden was rimmed by a colonnaded gallery. The north side was incorporated into the church during the 1516 restorations, becoming the right nave. The columns are all fluted and are particularly valuable since they were spoliated from earlier Roman houses. Similar columns have been found submerged in the port. Some of the column capitals depict monstrous animals or doves eating dates. They were probably made by an artisan imitating the Clunian style. Fragments of the ancient pavement are stored in the local Museo archeologico regionale eoliano, along with other material recovered during excavations, and a photographic reproduction of the "Constitutum" of Abbot Ambrogio in the Norman period.

== The cult of Saint Bartolomew ==
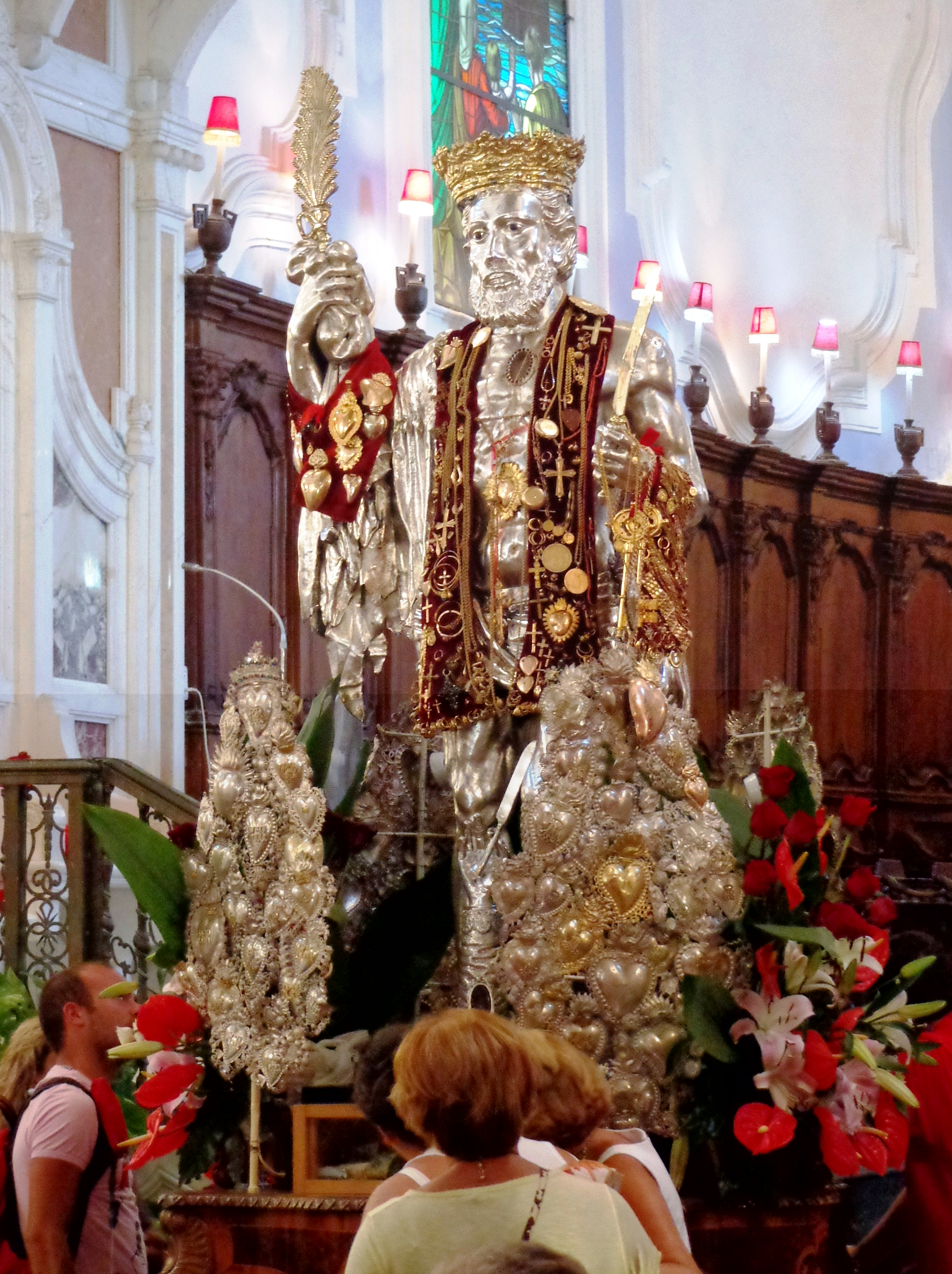
Silver statue of St Bartholomew.

Bartholomew the Apostle, also called Nathaniel Bartalmai, a name with means "Gift of God, son of the field, who moves the water," was martyred in Asia. Legend has it that the pagans were enraged by the pious veneration which the Christians offered to the holy martyr, seized the corpse, locked it in a lead casket and cast it in the sea. The sarcophagus was recovered and transported secretly or miraculously to Lipari, where the first Aeolian Christians built a great church to house his body.

St Bartholomew was one of the most venerated apostles, particularly because of his terrible flaying and martyrdom. On account of his name's meaning, he was especially fitting as a patron for the Liparians, skilled sailors whose livelihoods depended on the sea. After the Sack of Rome in 410, the spoils were taken to Maypherkat. In 507 Emperor Anastasius I transferred them to Darae in Mesopotamia. A Spanish merchant acquired brought them with him to Naples, whence they were voluntarily returned to Lipari. The body of St Bartholomew reappeared at Lipari in 546 and remained there until the siege and sack of the island by the Arabs. St Bartholomew had long been venerated on all the islands of the archipelago and when his body was recovered it was taken to Benevento for safekeeping. According to tradition, after the sack of the island, St Bartholomew appeared to a surviving monk in a dream and called on him to recover his bones, revealing their hiding place between the two altars: they were the brightest among a confused mass of bones. They were then secretly transferred by the Lombard prince Sicardo who sent the body of the saint to Sorrento and then to Benevento. The cult was never destroyed, however, but it became ever more established in all the Aeolian Islands and along with Saint Lucy, Saint Bartholomew is the protector and patron of the archdiocese of Messina. In Aeolian art, the saint is depicted half naked with his skin, the symbol of his martyrdom, on his right shoulder, a palm in his right hand, a knife in his left and a crown on his head. His motto is Per troppa Fedeltà porto Corona (For exceptional faith, I bear a crown).

== Festivals ==
There are four traditional festivals for the protector of the Aeolian Islands in the course of the year:

- 13 February. This festival is organised by the Guild of fishermen and commemorates the arrival of the body of the saint on Lipari.
- 5 March. The festival is organised by the guild of farmers and commemorates the years when Lipari suffered severe famine. A miracle of St Bartholomew brought grain to the island in a French vessel.
- 24 August. This is the principle festival and is organised by the local government.
- 16 November. This festival is celebrated to thank the holy protector for having spared the islanders from the terrible 1894 earthquake in south Calabria.

== Gallery ==
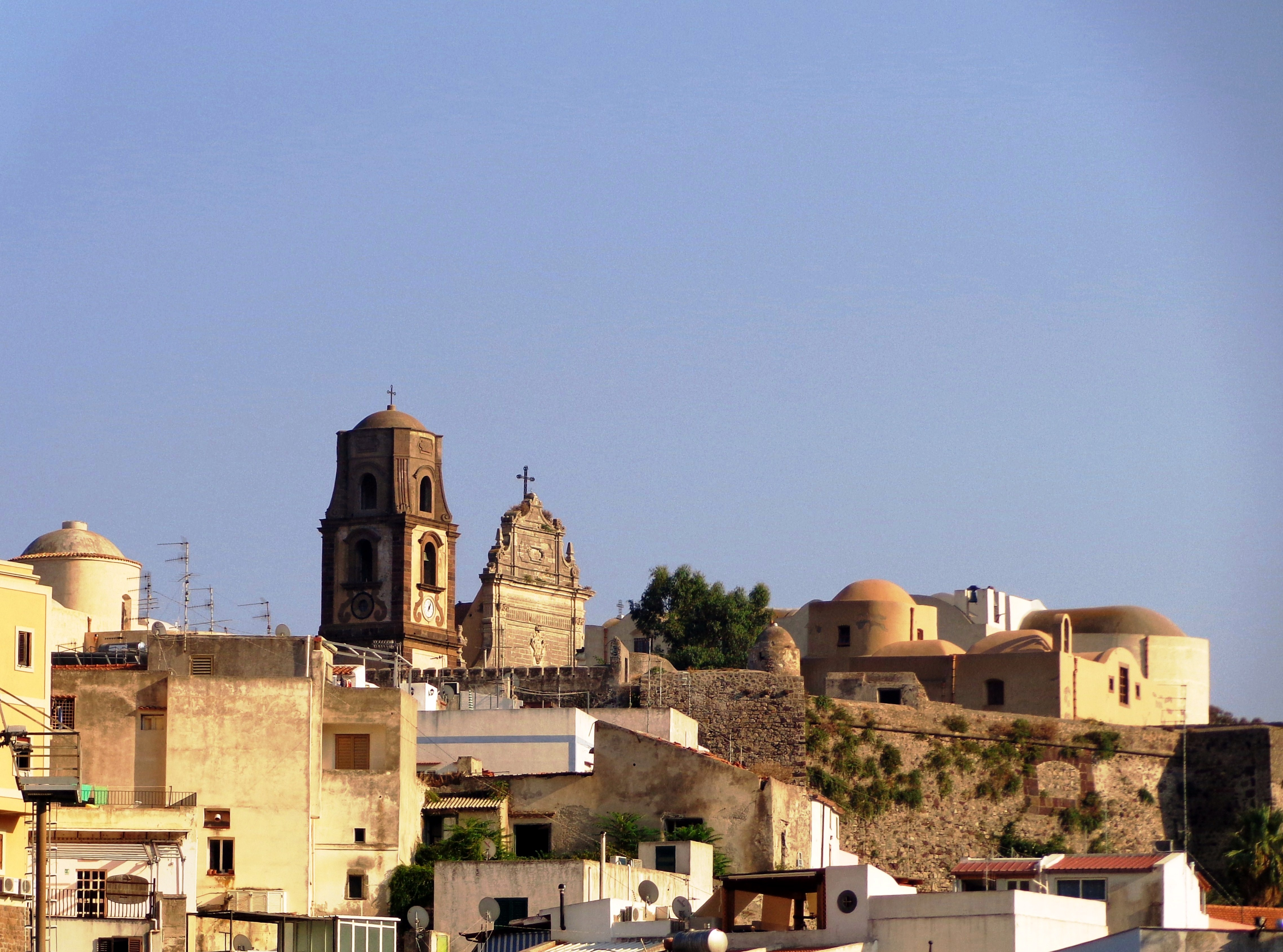
Fortified citadel

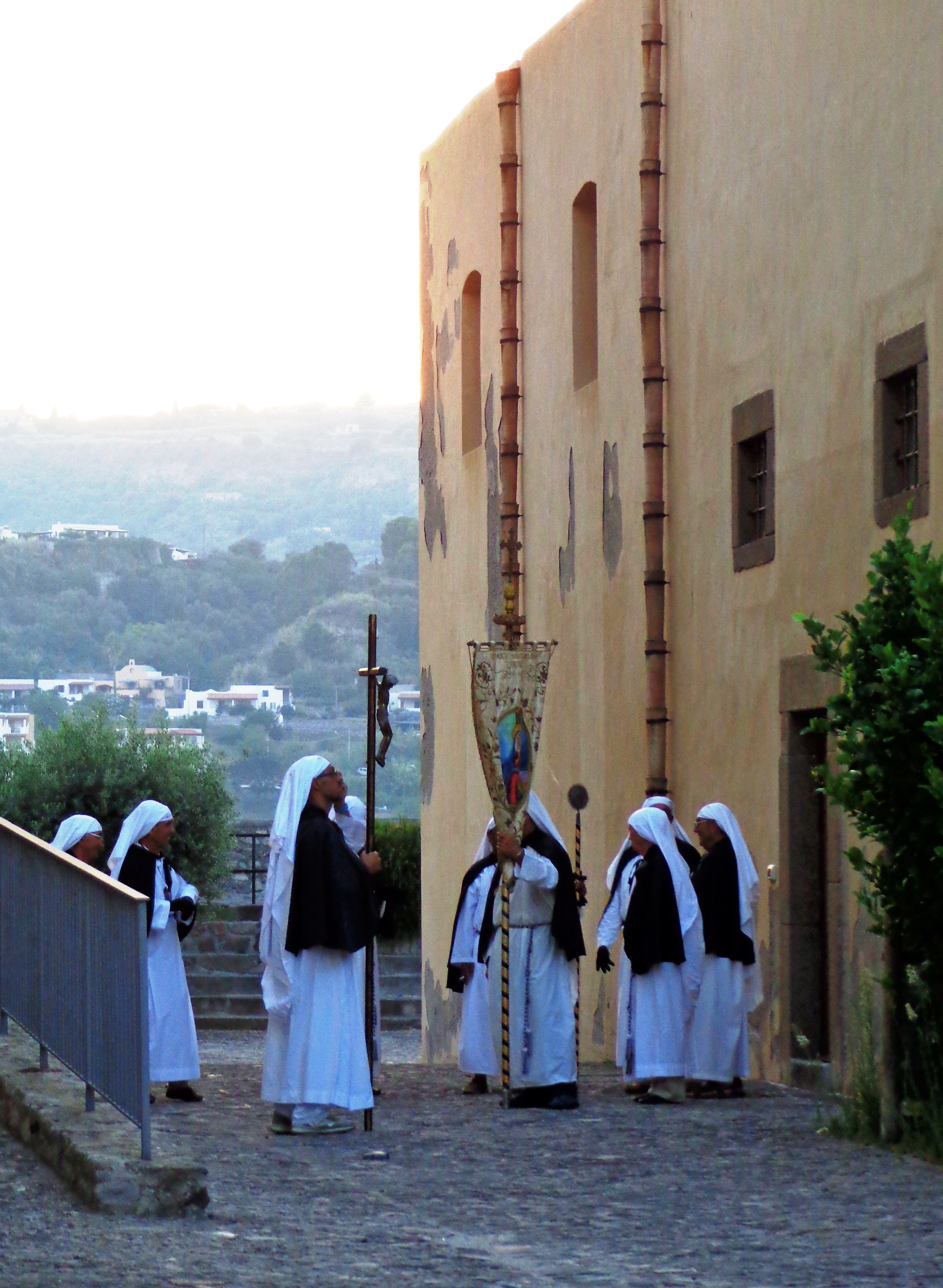
Cathedral chapter

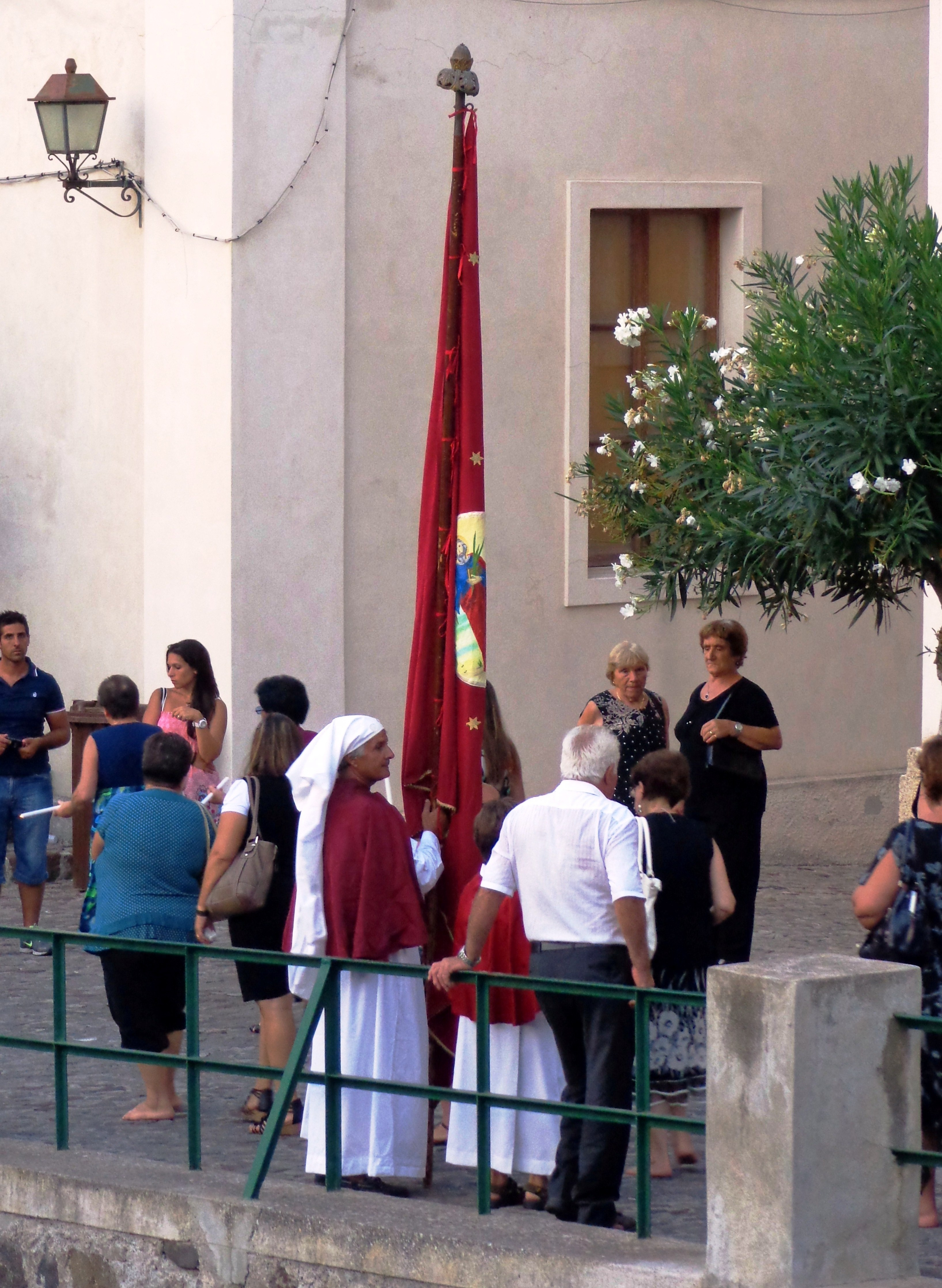
Cathedral chapter
