= San Pietro extra moenia, Spoleto =

Church in Spoleto, Italy

Coordinates: 42.7268°N 12.7378°E

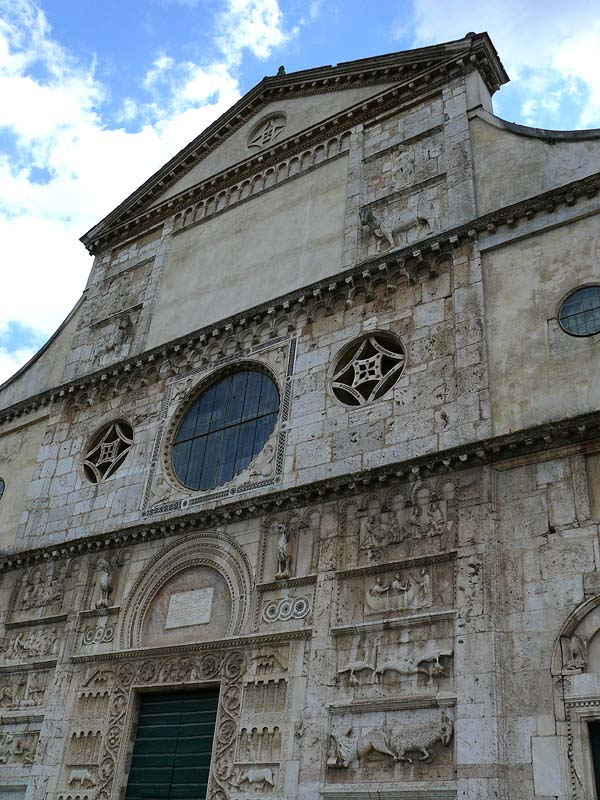
San Pietro church, façade

San Pietro extra moenia is an ancient Roman Catholic church in Spoleto, Umbria, Italy. Remarkable examples of Romanesque sculpture adorn its façade. The term extra moenia refers to its location outside the city walls.

The site was originally a necropolis, but a church dedicated to Saint Peter was founded here in the 5th century to house the chains that were believed to have once bound the saint. The present structure was constructed between the 12th and 13th centuries. Its richly decorated façade features ornamental figures, animals, and sculpted reliefs. Some scenes depict events from the life of Saint Peter, while others illustrate moral tales, such as a deer battling a snake.

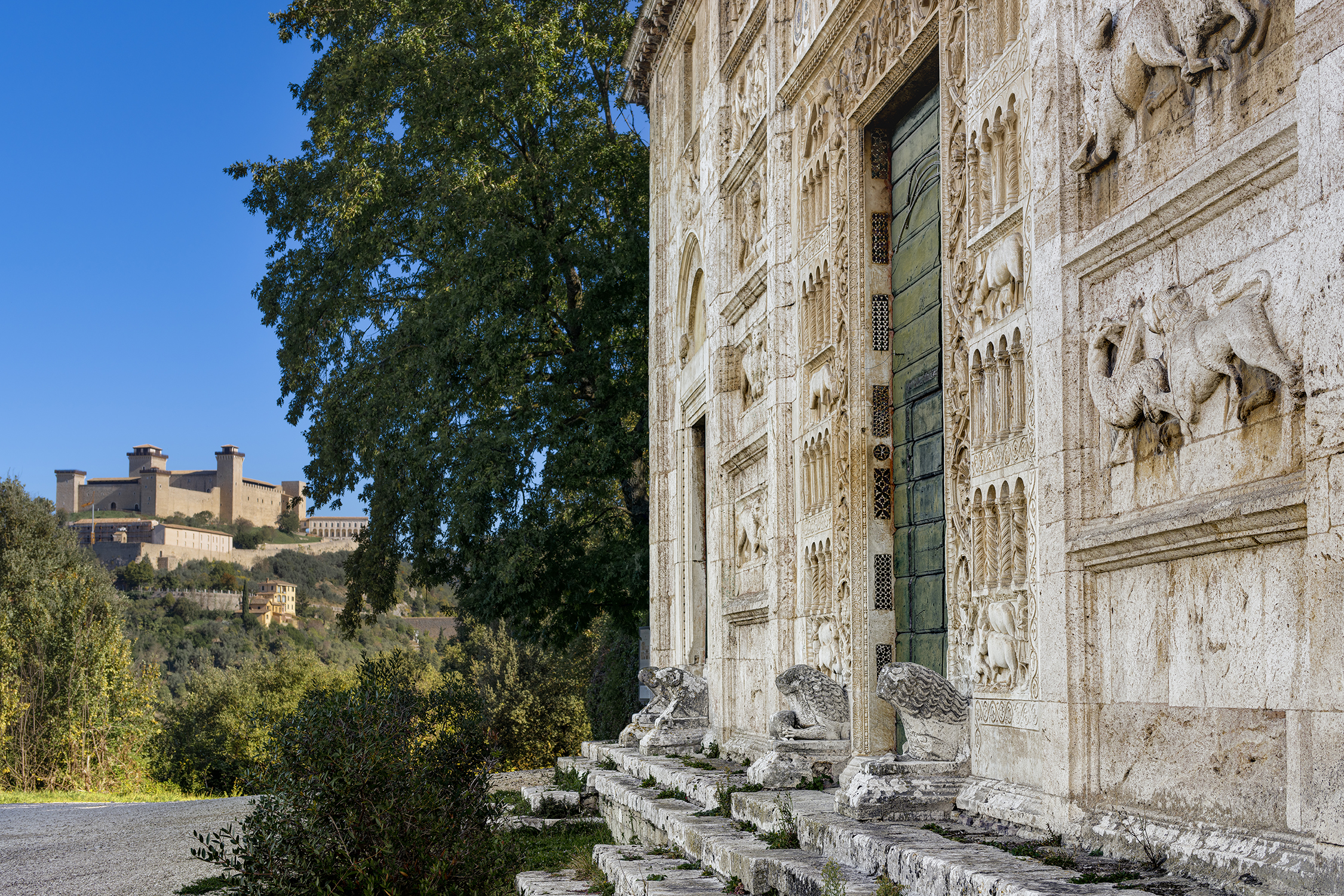
Main door to Church of San Pietro, Albornozian Fortress (Rocca Albornoziana) in the background

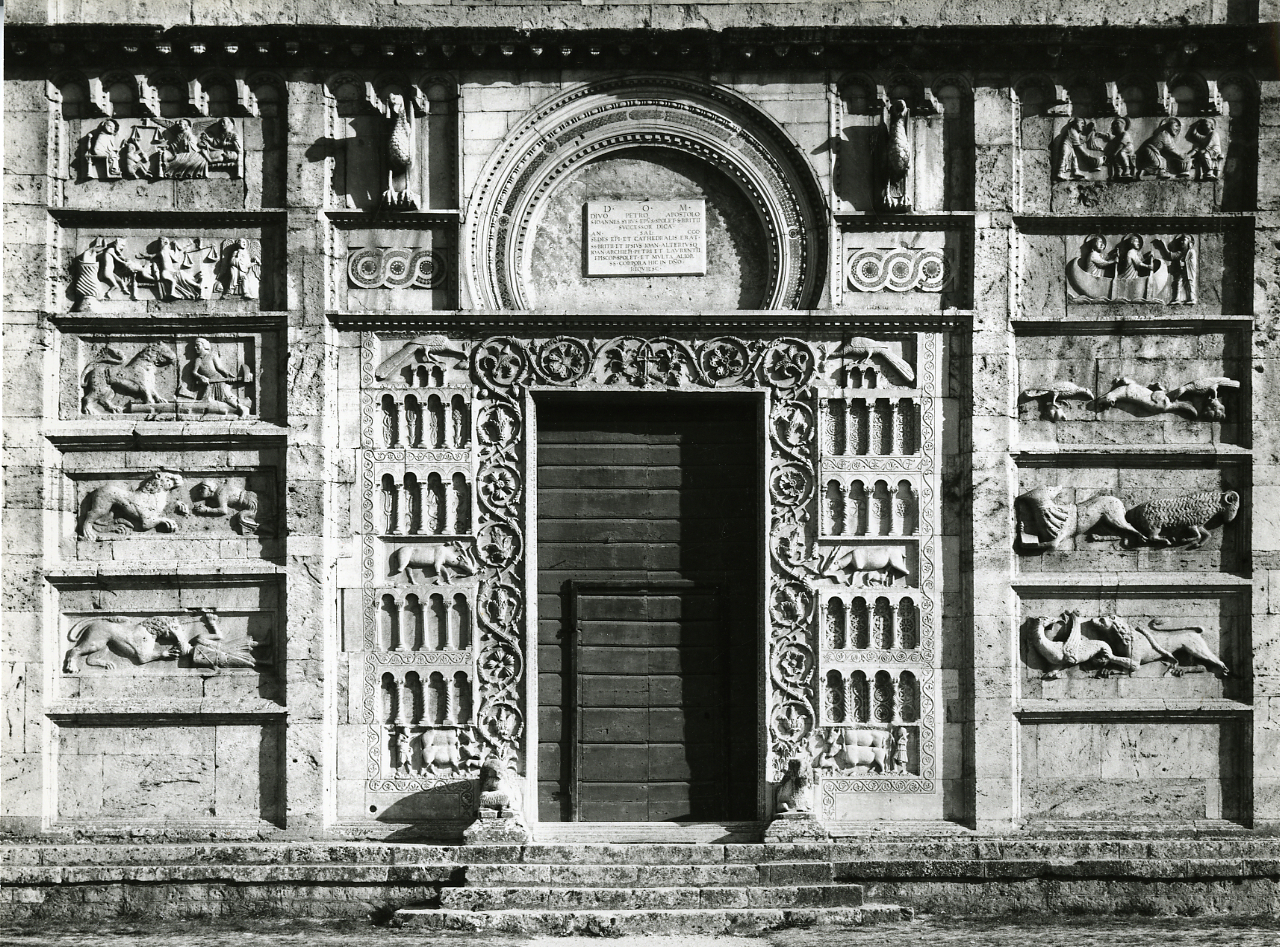
The main portal and the bas-reliefs. Photo by Paolo Monti, 1967

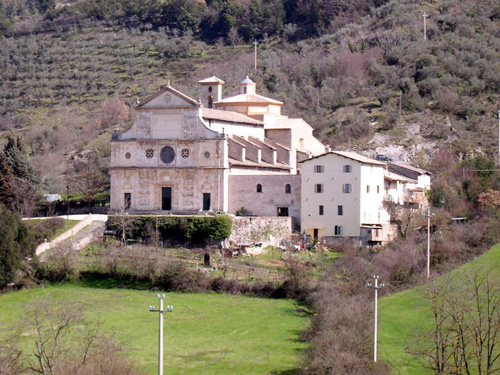
San Pietro extra moenia

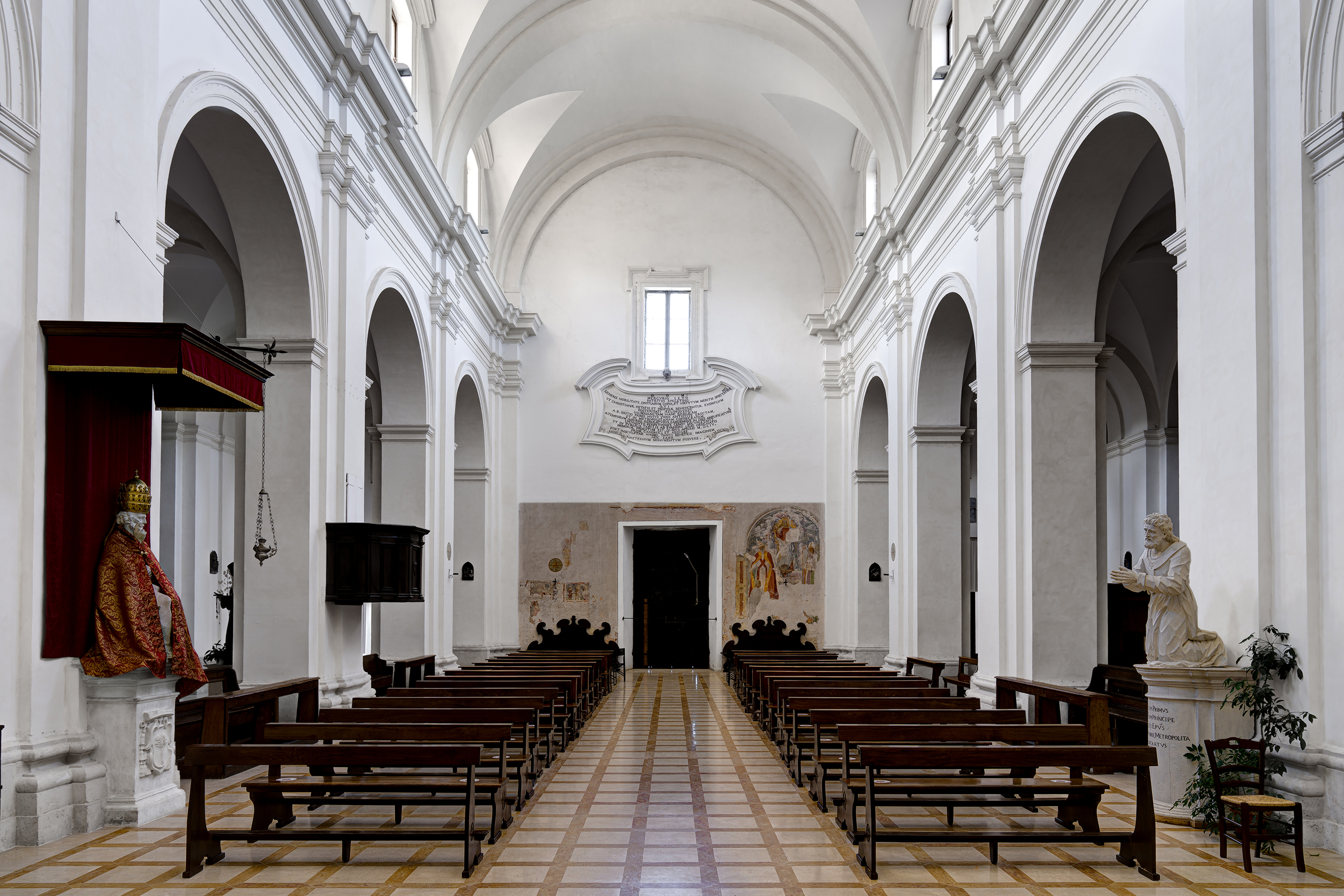
Interior of Church of San Pietro
