= Extra moenia =

Latin phrase related to pre-modern city planning

Extra moenia (also: extra muros) is a Latin phrase that means outside the walls or outside the walls of the city.

The phrase is commonly used in reference to the original attributes of a building, usually a church, which was built outside the original city walls. Hence, when a city expands over time, a church which was originally outside the walls might end up in the center of the larger city; subsequently, to retain the original architectural context, it would be referred to as extra moenia. The term is also used to indicate an occurrence or activity taking place outside the venue where it would normally be found or reside.

== Notable examples ==
- Basilica of Saint Paul Outside the Walls, Rome
- San Gennaro extra Moenia, Naples
- Santa Maria Extra Moenia, Antrodoco
- San Pietro extra moenia, Spoleto
