= Eleonora Cybo =

Italian noblewoman and writer

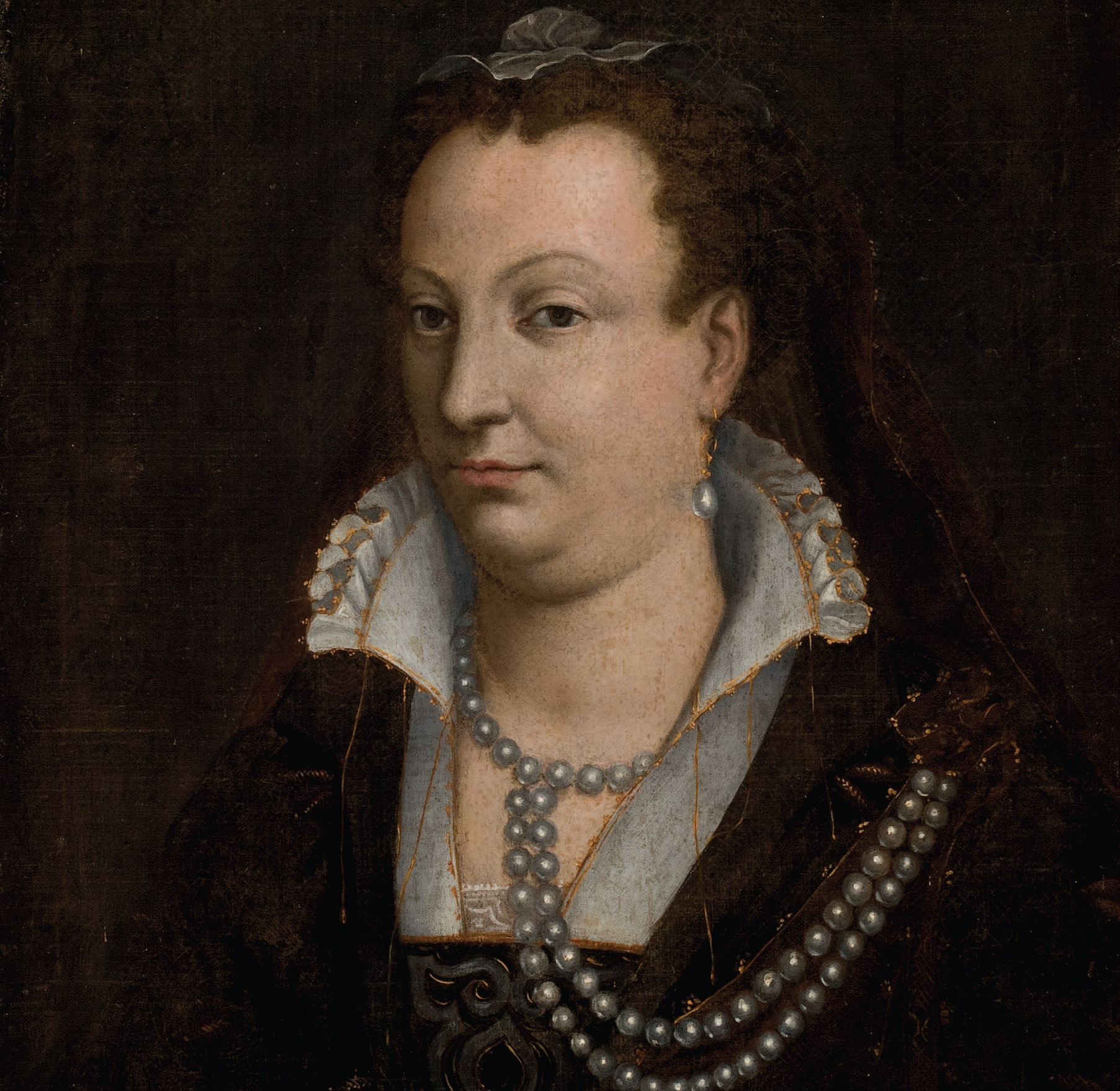

Eleonora Cybo-Malaspina (10 March 1523 – 22 February 1594) was an Italian noblewoman and writer. A princess from the House of Cybo-Malaspina, she was the daughter of Ricciarda Malaspina, Marquise of Massa and Lady of Carrara, and Lorenzo Cybo, Count of Ferentillo, who, from 1530 to 1541, also held, in a turbulent condominium, the sovereign titles of his wife.

== Family and early life ==
Eleonora was born in Massa on 10 March 1523. Through her paternal lineage, Eleonora was the granddaughter of Franceschetto Cybo, Duke of Spoleto—legitimized son of Pope Innocent VIII—and Maddalena de' Medici, daughter of Lorenzo de' Medici, ruler of Florence. On her maternal side, she was the granddaughter of Antonio Alberico II Malaspina, Marquess of Massa and Lord of Carrara, and Lucrezia d'Este, of the San Martino branch of the House of Este (she was a granddaughter of Duke Niccolò III through his son Sigismondo).

In 1535, while her mother and her aunt Taddea lived a loose and unconventional life in the Cybos' Florentine palace, Eleonora was placed in the Murate convent in Florence, under the supervision and affectionate care of her aunt, Caterina Cybo.

== First marriage ==
Eleonora's parents had differing views on her marriage. Her father chose Gian Luigi Fieschi, a Genoese noble, while her mother, who was Fieschi's aunt from her first marriage, preferred other matches. Despite Ricciarda's opposition, an engagement contract with the House of Fieschi was signed in 1539 and reaffirmed in 1541.

Unhappily residing in a convent, Eleonora urged her uncle, Cardinal Innocenzo Cybo, to hurry the marriage process. The marriage agreement was finalized in 1542, and Eleonora married Gian Luigi Fieschi on 30 January 1543, through a proxy ceremony.

In January 1547, Gian Luigi Fieschi was killed in a conspiracy. Eleonora, who was still childless, sought refuge in a convent and, having proved unable to recover her dowry, she eventually moved back to Tuscany settling with her father at Agnano, not far from Pisa.

== Second marriage and later years ==
Unhappy with the prospect of having to return to cloistered life, Eleonora sought the help of Grand Duke Cosimo I of Tuscany, a distant relative of her father's, who arranged her marriage to condottiero Chiappino Vitelli. Despite her family's objections, she married Vitelli on 10 October 1549, and received a substantial dowry.

Due to Chiappino's frequent military campaigns, Eleonora spent most of her time in the Murate convent. This marriage also remained childless. After Chiappino's death in 1575, Eleonora returned to the convent permanently, gaining some autonomy to manage her affairs.

== Literary contributions and legacy ==
Eleonora was recognized by contemporaries as a learned woman of high culture.

Eleonora's intellectual circle included notables such as poet Bernardo Cappello, humanist Ludovico Domenichi, and poetess Laura Battiferra, who dedicated sonnets to her. Eleonora died on February 22, 1594, in Florence and was buried in the Murate convent church.
