= Giulio Cybo =

Italian noble (1525–48)

Giulio Cibo (1525 – 18 May 1548) (later often spelled Cybo) was an Italian noble of Genoese ancestry, who was briefly marquis of Massa and lord of Carrara from 1546 to 1547, ousting his mother Ricciarda Malaspina. However, in a few months she managed to regain power and Giulio ended up beheaded the following year in Milan, exemplarily condemned to death for treason by the emperor Charles V.

Giulio sometimes also styled himself "Giulio Cibo Malaspina", thus taking his mother's family name as well, and with the double surname he has frequently been reported in subsequent historiography.

== Family and Massa-Carrara succession ==
Born in Rome, he was the elder son of Ricciarda Malaspina, sovereign marquise of Massa and Carrara, and Lorenzo Cybo, count of Ferentillo, a grandson of Pope Innocent VIII and Lorenzo de' Medici.

Upon the death of her father Antonio Alberico in 1519, Ricciarda had become the aspiring heir to his fiefs of Massa and Carrara. His will, drawn up shortly before his death, had established as his heir in the first instance Ricciarda's eldest surviving son (if any). In the meantime, she was named "lady and mistress and usufructuary and heiress of his [Antonio Alberico's] inheritance and assets, as long as she is of age to conceive and bear children". Given the dubious legitimacy of the will due to the possible violation of the inheritance rights of Antonio Alberico's grandnephews, who were already alive at the time, and her consequently insecure position, Ricciarda secretly appealed for Emperor Charles V's superior intervention in her favour. Thus, on 16 July 1529, she succeeded in getting invested with the two fiefdoms suo jure, with a truly unusual imperial decree: in derogation of the Salic law, it gave her the right to transmit her titles not only to her male descendants, but, in their absence, also to females, always respecting the newly established principle of primogeniture. With a second decree dated 7 April 1533, she even obtained the right to nominate her own successor.

The content of the imperial decrees was in clear conflict with the will and, on coming of age, Giulio would begin to undermine his mother's position by referring to the latter.

Meanwhile, starting in the very early 1530s, marital relations between his parents had completely broken down and Ricciarda had become the mistress of her brother-in-law, Cardinal Innocenzo Cybo.

== Rivalry with his mother ==
In 1543, when he was eighteen, Giulio was sent to Barcelona where, with the support of the Genoese admiral Andrea Doria, he entered the court of Emperor Charles V, becoming first a "gentleman of mouth", then an "imperial chamberlain". He was in Italy and Flanders following the imperial armies, and accompanied the emperor's right-hand man, Ferrante Gonzaga, on a mission to England.

The following year, however, embittered because the allegedly insufficient financial allowance provided to him by his mother had prevented him from pursuing his desired military career, Giulio returned to Italy. He first settled temporarily in the fortress of Carrara, with his uncle Cardinal Cybo, then at Agnano, near Pisa, with his father, then in Rome. Here, as the firstborn, he demanded the transfer of the marquisate of imperious Ricciarda, but she flatly refused, considering herself legitimately invested with it in a personal capacity, with also the right, granted to her by the 1533 imperial decree, to autonomously choose her successor. She even let it slip that her choice might fall on her beloved secondborn. A fierce conflict ensued between mother and son, which at first seemed to turn in Giulio's favour, but which in the end had a tragic outcome for him.

After a failed attempt to force his mother out in 1545, the following year Giulio challenged her again for control of the marquisate. With the backing of Cosimo I de' Medici and Andrea Doria, he seized power by force, occupying the lands of Massa and Carrara with troops led by his father Lorenzo. Ricciarda immediately appealed to the emperor, and Charles V decided to temporarily confiscate the marquisate placing it in the hands of his plenipotentiary in Italy, Ferrante Gonzaga, and then, at Giulio's request, in those of Cardinal Cybo.

Giulio's recalcitrance in complying with the imperial decisions and the suspicions aroused in Cosimo I by his increasingly close ties with the Doria family, induced the Duke of Florence to have him arrested in Pisa on 17 March 1547 and to keep him in prison until the 20th when he finally accepted to place the marquisate in the hands of his uncle.

In the meantime, in December 1546, Giulio had married Peretta Doria (1526–1591), daughter of Tommaso and sister of Giannettino, prominent members of the Genoese House of Doria. Giulio had been promised a large dowry, with which he imagined funding his conquest of power. In fact, he kept on exerting heavy pressure upon his mother, with promises, threats and new acts of force, and, mainly thanks to the intercession of his uncle the Cardinal, he finally obtained the stipulation of an onerous contract with her for the purchase of government rights over the marquisate, remaining the sovereignty in her possession. The burdens of the contract, however, were absolutely beyond his means and he planned to cover the large debt arising from it –amounting to 40,000 ducats– half from the funds he himself expected to raise, and half from his wife's entire dowry. Andrea Doria, the head of the family, refused to proceed with the payment of the dowry, initially blaming the family's financial difficulties in that period and then arguing that he had practically already paid what he owed for the dowry, by financing Giulio's attempts to seize the marquisate by force. At that time Andrea Doria was a very high magistrate ("perpetual censor") of the Republic of Genoa, an ally of Emperor and King of Spain Charles V, to whom the petty Massese state, as an imperial fief, was also linked by a bond of loyalty.

On 27 June 1547, pending Giulio's payment of the entire agreed amount, Ricciarda retook possession of the marquisate.

== Fieschi conspiracies and death ==
Giulio had previously loyally supported Andrea Doria. In January 1547, on the occasion of a revolt led by his brother-in-law Giovanni Luigi Fieschi, he had not hesitated to send a small military expedition to help Doria; which, however, had been stopped along the way by the news of the failure of the rebellion.

After Doria refused to pay him the dowry, however, Giulio's attitude changed radically and, in the second half of the year, he joined a plot against Doria set by Giovanni Luigi's brother, Ottobuono Fieschi and other Genoese refugees in Venice, and also backed by the Florentine Strozzi family, now in the service of France, and by the new Duke of Parma, Pier Luigi Farnese. More or less behind the scenes there were probably the latter's father Pope Paul III and the French. The aim was to enter the city and assassinate Doria, the Spanish ambassador and other members of the Doria party. These events were supposed to trigger a popular revolt and the plan was to be completed by the arrival of French troops from Piedmont.

The plot was discovered before action was taken and Cybo was arrested in Pontremoli on 22 January 1548. Despite attempts to save him by his mother and his distant cousin Cosimo I of Tuscany, he was found guilty of treason and beheaded in Milan in May 1548.

Upon his mother's death in 1553, the states of Massa and Carrara were ultimately inherited by his younger brother Alberico I, who, in compliance with Ricciarda's testamentary provisions, took the new surname Cybo Malaspina adding her family name to his father's (as his brother had done on his own initiative about ten years earlier).

Giulio Cybo was initially buried in the Milanese church of Sant'Angelo (belonging to the Order of Friars Minor, to whom Giulio wrote to his uncle to make a donation). By order of Alberico I, his body was finally transferred to Massa in 1573, and buried in the crypt of the cathedral beside the remains of his parents.

== See also ==
- History of Genoa
- Italian Wars

Preceded by Ricciarda	Marquis of Massa; Lord of Carrara; 1546–1548	Succeeded by Ricciarda
