= Ferentillo =

- Comune
- Comune di Ferentillo
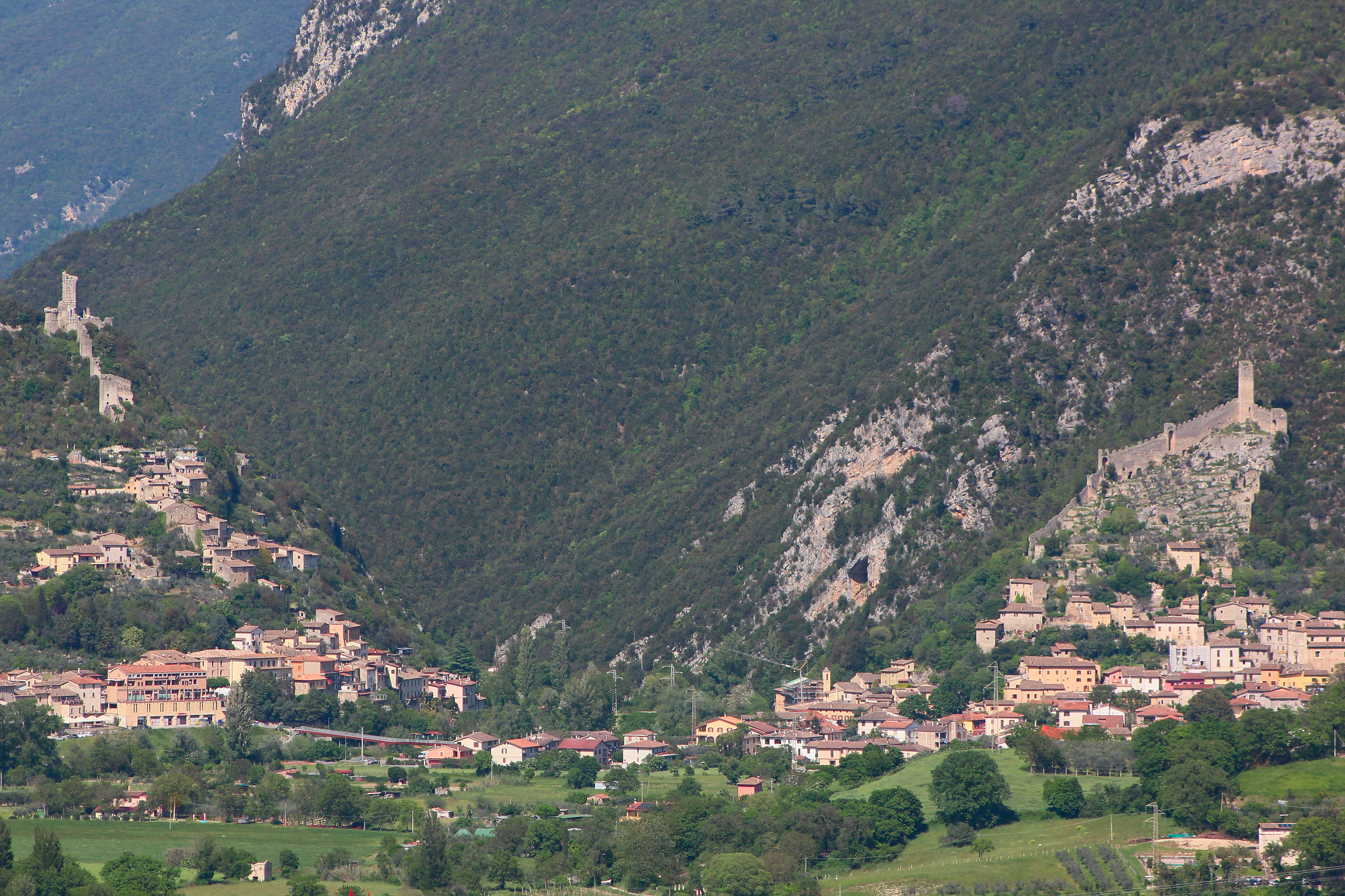
- View of Ferentillo

- Location within Italy Location within Umbria
- Coordinates: 42.620559°N 12.790071°E
- Country: Italy
- Region: Umbria
- Province: Terni (TR)

Government
  - Mayor: Elisabetta Cascelli

Area
  - Total: 69.5 km^{2} (26.8 sq mi)
- Elevation: 260 m (850 ft)

Population (1 January 2025)
  - Total: 1,788
  - Density: 25.7/km^{2} (66.6/sq mi)
- Demonym: Ferentillesi
- Time zone: UTC+1 (CET)
  - Summer (DST): UTC+2 (CEST)
- Postal code: 05034
- Dialing code: 0744
- Patron saint: St. Sebastian
- Saint day: January 20
- Website: Official website

Ferentillo is a comune (municipality) in the Province of Terni in the Italian region Umbria, located about 60 km southeast of Perugia and about 12 km northeast of Terni.

The comune, located in the valley of the Nera, is divided by the river into the burghs of Matterella and Precetto.

== Etymology ==
Adone Palmieri reported that some writers derived the name Ferentillo from the ancient city of Ferentium, while others attribute it to settlers originating from Ferentino.

== History ==
Ferentillo has origins dating back to the 8th century, closely linked to the Abbey of San Pietro in Valle. Its foundation is associated with the Lombard duke Faroald II. Faroald II built the church and monastery and, after being deposed by his son Transamund around 724, retired there, where he lived as a monk for eight years before dying and being buried on the site.

Although various Latin inscriptions from the Roman period were found in the area, they do not indicate a direct continuity of settlement. No remains of an ancient or Roman structure were identified at the site of the abbey.

In the centuries that followed, the abbey and its estate sought to assert independence from both the Duchy of Spoleto and the ecclesiastical authority in Rome. In 1302 the abbey was united to the Lateran Chapter by Pope Boniface VIII. By 1400 Spoleto had acquired civil jurisdiction over the abbey and the surrounding castles.

In 1484 Ferentillo became a small state under Pope Innocent VIII of the Cybo family. Its first lord was Franceschetto Cybo, who strengthened dynastic ties through his marriage to Maddalena de' Medici. In 1515 Lorenzo Cybo married Ricciarda Malaspina, linking the territory to the political sphere of the Principality of Massa Carrara and Piombino. Under the Cybo-Malaspina family, Ferentillo experienced increased cultural and political importance, reinforced by their patronage.

In 1563 Alberico I Cybo-Malaspina issued statutes that ensured the full independence of the state, which remained an independent principality until 1730. In that year Alderano Cybo sold the territory to Niccolò Benedetti and the Montecchio family of Fano.

A road connecting Ferentillo to Norcia was opened under Pope Urban VII.

In 1799 Ferentillo was occupied by insurgents before being retaken by troops from Spoleto. During the Napoleonic period it formed part of the Department of Trasimeno.

In 1803, Ferentillo was a feudal domain of the Count Montevecchio di Fano. By 1818, it had passed to the Duke of Montevecchio.

In 1847 Pope Pius IX granted the territory to the French Montholon family, conferring upon them the princely title. In 1860, following Italian unification, Ferentillo became a municipality.

In the mid-19th century Ferentillo had a population of 2,366 inhabitants, of whom 2,039 lived in the main settlements and 327 in the countryside.

== Geography ==
The town is located in the Valnerina at an elevation of 252 metres (827 ft) above sea level. It lies about 12 miles (19 km) from Spoleto and approximately 2.5 miles (4.0 km) from Arrone and Montefranco.

The river Nera divides it into two distinct nuclei: Precetto and Matterella. The settlement developed along the valley floor while preserving this dual structure. The municipal territory is included within the Parco Fluviale del Nera.

Nearby wooded areas include those known as Macchia Bandita, Monte Solenne, and Pago. The territory around Monte Solenne is noted for hunting and for the presence of mushrooms and truffles.

Ferentillo borders the following municipalities: Arrone, Leonessa, Montefranco, Monteleone di Spoleto, Polino, Scheggino, Spoleto.

=== Subdivisions ===
The municipality includes the localities of Ampognano, Castellonalto, Castellone Basso, Colle Olivo, Ferentillo, Le Mura, Leazzano, Loreno, Macchialunga, Macenano, Monterivoso, Nicciano, Sambucheto, San Mamiliano, Terria, Terria di Contra.

In 2021, 166 people lived in rural dispersed dwellings not assigned to any named locality. At the time, the most populous locality was Ferentillo proper (1,221).

== Economy ==
In the 19th century the local economy was based on agricultural production, particularly olives, wine, and mulberry cultivation, as well as products such as truffles and mushrooms.

== Religion and culture ==
=== Abbey of San Pietro ===
The abbey church of San Pietro, located about 6 kilometres (3.7 mi) from the village, is in the form of a Latin cross and measures 34 metres (112 ft) in length and 8 metres (26 ft) in width. By the late 19th century it was described as largely bare, apart from five Roman sarcophagi placed against the walls.

Above the entrance to the second cloister is a lunette fresco depicting Christ seated on a tomb with two saints. In the same cloister, on the south side, are remains of a double portico dating to the 13th century. Fragments of granite and marble columns and a Corinthian capital are also present.

The church entrance is framed by marble jambs in high relief depicting Saint Peter and Saint Paul, a work dating to before the 11th century. Inside, votive frescoes include a Madonna with Child and Saint Sebastian dated 1526, and other works dated 1513. The nave once featured cycles of Old Testament scenes, later partially covered by subsequent paintings; these works have been attributed to the 12th century and display Byzantine characteristics.

The presbytery contains remains of Roman decorative sculpture. The high altar is formed from two superimposed Roman sarcophagi. In the apse is a large fresco of God blessing, flanked by six angels. Other sarcophagi depict scenes such as Bacchic imagery, Cupid and Psyche, and a boar hunt. One of these is traditionally said to contain the remains of Faroaldo II.

=== Other religious buildings ===
The principal church, located in Matterella, is a collegiate church dedicated to Santa Maria della Pietà and Saint Magnus, the patron saint. It has three semi-Gothic naves with marble columns and a bell tower, and containing frescoes attributed to Pietro Perugino, Andrea Mantegna, and Lo Spagna.

In Precetto there is a nativity scene attributed to pupils of Perugino.

A Capuchin convent stood on a nearby hill, where Joseph of Leonessa is buried.

=== Old cemetery ===
The old cemetery, originally a church dating to the 11th or 12th century and later converted into a burial in the 17th century, is situated about 30 metres (98 ft) above the plain and partly excavated into the rock.

The site became known for its capacity to preserve bodies through natural mummification. About twenty naturally mummified bodies are preserved, discovered in 1805 following a Napoleonic edict that ordered the removal of burials from inside churches. The oldest dates to around the 16th century, while the most recent is from the 19th century.

This phenomenon attracted the attention of physicians and scientists, and was studied in the late 19th century. The process was attributed to the dry, ventilated environment and the composition of the soil. The site now functions as a museum.

=== Main sights ===
- At Matterella:
  - Collegiata di Santa Maria (13th century), with fresco of Raphael school.
  - Medieval castle
- At Precetto:
  - Church of Santo Stefano (16th century), with frescoes of Perugino school. The crypt is from the 14th century and has frescoes of the same age.
  - Museum of Mummies
  - Medieval castle
  - Palazzo Montholon

== Notable people ==
Ferentillo is described in 19th century sources as the birthplace of several notable individuals, including Tenderini, a military captain active in Spain; the jurist Zaccaria Alberti; Demetrio Silvani Loreni, a government official in Rome in 1844; and Antonio Erculei, a scholar associated with the Vatican Library and later a professor in the Roman seminary.

Among notable figures connected to the area is Prince Luigi Desiderato Montholon, listed among the prominent landowners.

== Twin towns ==
- Sérignan-du-Comtat, France
