= Cibo =

Cibo may refer to:

- Cibo (artist), Italian antifascist street artist
- Cibo (Blame!), fictional character
- Cardinal Cibo (disambiguation)
- Cibo Espresso, coffee franchise
- Cibo family
- CIBO, Channel Islands Brussels Office
