= Giovanni Luigi Fieschi =

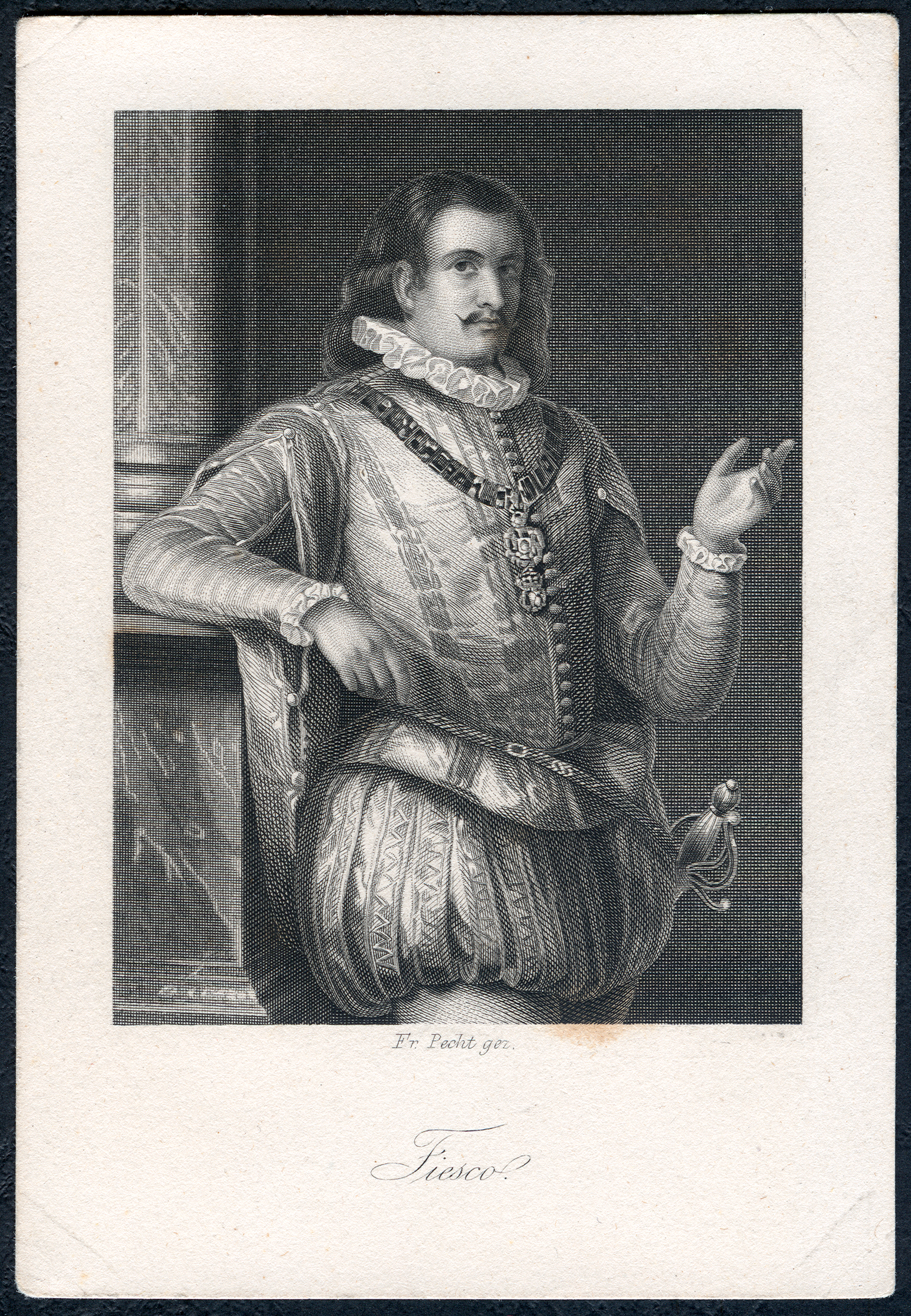
Fieschi in an engraving by Karl Moritz Lämmel after a drawing by Friedrich Pecht (c. 1859)

Giovanni Luigi Fieschi or Fiesco (Ligurian: Gian Loigi Fiesco; c. 1522 – 2 January 1547) was a Genoese nobleman, count of Lavagna. He is best known as the subject of the play Fiesco by Friedrich Schiller.

== Early life ==
The Fieschi were one of the prominent families of Liguria, first mentioned in the 10th century. Among his kin were popes (Innocent IV and Adrian V), many cardinals, a king of Sicily, three saints, and many generals and admirals of Genoa and other states.

Sinibaldo Fieschi, his father, had been a close friend of Andrea Doria, and had rendered many service to the Genoese Republic. On his death in 1532, Giovanni found himself at the age of nine the head of the family and possessor of immense estates. He was described as handsome, intelligent, of attractive manners and very ambitious. In 1540 he married Eleonora Cibo (1523–1594), a noblewoman of Ligurian-Tuscan origin, described as a woman of great beauty and influence: she was the daughter of the marquise of Massa and Carrara, Ricciarda Malaspina and, through her father Lorenzo Cybo, a great-granddaughter of Pope Innocent VIII and Lorenzo de' Medici.

== Doria family conspiracy ==
Giovanni Luigi Fieschi is best known for his part in a failed conspiracy against the Doria family. There were many reasons which inspired his hatred of the Doria family; the almost absolute power wielded by the aged admiral and the insolence of his nephew and heir Giannettino Doria, the commander of the galleys, were galling to him and many other Genoese. It is rumored that Giannettino had affairs with Fieschi's wife. Moreover, the Fieschi belonged to the French or popular party, while the Doria were aristocrats and pro-Spanish. Fieschi conspiracy against Doria found allies in Pope Paul III, in the Duke of Parma Pier Luigi Farnese and in Francis I of France. In Genoa, co-conspirators were his brothers Girolamo and Ottobuono, Verrina and R. Sacco.

A number of armed men from the Fieschi fiefs had been secretly brought to Genoa, and they agreed that on 2 January 1547, during the interregnum before the election of the new doge, they should seize the galleys in the port and the city gates.

The first part of the plan was easily carried out, and Giannettino Doria, aroused by the tumult, was killed as he rushed to the port. Andrea Doria, however, fled from the city unharmed. The conspirators attempted to gain possession of the government, but Giovanni Luigi, while crossing a plank from the quay to one of the galleys, fell into the water and drowned. The news of his death spread consternation among the Fieschi faction, and Girolamo Fieschi found few adherents. They came to terms with the senate and were granted a general amnesty. However, when Doria returned to Genoa on 4 January, he ignored the amnesty, and confiscated the Fieschi estates. Girolamo, Verrina, Sacco and other conspirators had secluded themselves in his castle of Montoggio, which the Genoese, at Doria's instigation, besieged and captured. Girolamo Fieschi and Verrina were tried, tortured and executed; all their estates were seized, including Torriglia, which Doria obtained for himself (though it and several other seized estates were eventually returned to the Fieschi). Ottobuono Fieschi, who escaped, was captured eight years later and put to death by Doria's orders. (Note: "There are many accounts of the conspiracy, of which perhaps the best is contained in E. Petit's André Doria (Paris, 1887), chs. xi. and xii., where all the chief authorities are quoted; see also Calligari, La Congiura del Fiesco (Venice, 1892), and Gavazzo, Nuovi documenti sulla congiura del conte Fiesco (Genoa, 1886); E. Bernabò-Brea, in his Sulla congiura di Giovanni Luigi Fieschi, publishes many important documents, while L. Capelloni's Congiura del Fiesco, edited by Olivieri, and A. Mascardi's Congiura del conte Giovanni Luigi de' Fieschi (Antwerp, 1629) may be commended among the earlier works." (Villari 1911).)

== Culture ==
The Fiesco conspiracy has been the subject of many poems and dramas, of which the most famous Fiesco by Friedrich Schiller.

== Notes ==
Footnotes

Citations
