= Giulia da Varano =

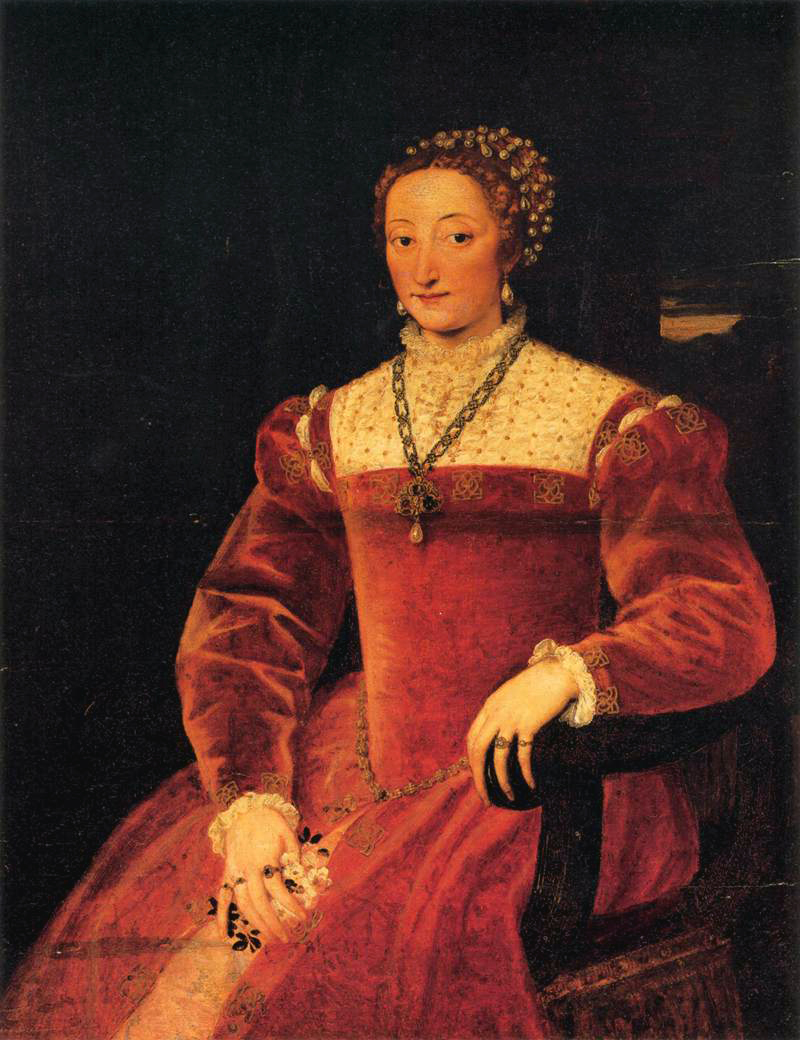
- Portrait by Titian, ca. 1545. Currently at Galleria Palatina e Appartamenti reali, Palazzo Pitti.

Duchess of Camerino
- Tenure: 14 August 1527 – 1539

Duchess consort of Urbino
- Tenure: 11 October 1534 – 18 February 1547
- Born: 24 March 1523; Camerino, Macerata, Marche, Italy
- Died: 18 February 1547 (aged 23); Fossombrone, Pesaro e Urbino, Marche, Italy
- Burial: Monastery of Santa Chiara, Urbino
- Spouse: Guidobaldo II della Rovere, Duke of Urbino (m. 1534)
- Issue: Virginia Feltria della Rovere, Countess of Arona and Duchess of Gravina
- House: Da Varano (by birth) della Rovere (by marriage)
- Father: Giovanni Maria da Varano
- Mother: Caterina Cybo

Giulia da Varano, also known after her marriage as Giulia da Varano della Rovere (24 March 1523 – 18 February 1547), was an Italian noblewoman and member of the Da Varano family. She was the ruling Duchess of Camerino during 1527–1539 (under the regency of her mother until 1535) and by marriage Duchess of Urbino from 1534 until her death.

== Life ==
=== Origins and early years ===
Born in Camerino on 24 March 1523, Giulia was the only child of Giovanni Maria da Varano, Lord and since 1515 Duke of Camerino and Caterina Cybo. Her paternal grandparents were Giulio Cesare da Varano, Lord of Camerino and Giovanna Malatesta (daughter of Sigismondo Pandolfo Malatesta, Lord of Rimini and Fano, known by the nickname "the Wolf of Romagna"). Her maternal grandparents were Franceschetto Cybo, Duke of Spoleto (in turn illegitimate son of Pope Innocent VIII) and Maddalena de' Medici (daughter of Lorenzo de' Medici, Lord of Florence, nicknamed "the Magnificent" by his contemporaries as one of the most powerful and enthusiastic patron of Renaissance culture in Italy). Soon after her birth, Giulia was baptized by Bishop Varino Favorino.

=== Duchess of Camerino ===
Giovanni Maria da Varano died on 14 August 1527. Giulia, as his only legitimate child, succeeded him as Sovereign Duchess of Camerino, after being received the formal investiture from Pope Clement VII. Her mother Caterina Cybo acted as regent for the underage Duchess. Before his death, Giulia's father arranged the betrothal between her and Mattia, the son of Ercole da Varano, a member of the Ferrarese branch of the Da Varano family and with close ties with the House of Este; in this way Giovanni Maria wanted to secure the rule of his daughter with the support of the Dukes of Ferrara and also kept Camerino in the hands of the Da Varano family. However, Giulia's mother refused to fulfill the will of her late husband. In order to protect the interests of her daughter against her relatives from Ferrara, Caterina Cybo promised his daughter in marriage to Guidobaldo della Rovere, heir of the Duchy of Urbino. On 14 December 1527, an agreement was signed in Todi according to which, upon reaching marriageable age, Giulia was to marry Guidobaldo and bring a dowry of 30,000 ducats. Under this agreement, her husband also became in co-ruler of the Duchy of Camerino with half of the income from the domain as his personal property.

This marriage was opposed by Pope Paul III, who planned to marry Giulia with his grandson Ottavio Farnese. Despite the opposition of the Holy See, on 11 October 1534 the Dowager Duchess and Regent of Camerino married her 11-year-old daughter to the 20-year-old Hereditary Prince of Urbino. Immediately after this, the pontiff demanded that the Duchy of Camerino be returned to the Papal States. In 1539, Giulia was forced to gave the ownership of the Duchy of Camerino to Pope Paul III for 78,000 scudi. After intense pressure from the Holy See in 1542, Guidobaldo (by then Duke of Urbino) also recognized the annexation of the Duchy of Camerino to the Papal States.

=== Issue and death ===
The marriage of Giulia da Varano and Guidobaldo II della Rovere produced two children: the first one died shortly after birth, and the second was a daughter, Virginia Feltria (born 17 September 1544 – died February 1571), who later married firstly in 1560 with Federico Borromeo (1535-1562), Prince of Oria and Count of Arona (nephew of Pope Pius IV), and secondly in 1569 with Ferdinando Orsini, Duke of Gravina. Virginia had no surviving children from any of her marriages, so Giulia's line became extinct with the death of her daughter.

Giulia da Varano died on 18 February 1547 aged 23 at Fossombrone and was buried in the church at the Monastery of Santa Chiara in Urbino. During the exhumation of the Duchess's remains in 1999, researchers found she was buried with a luxurious funeral dress.

== Portraits ==
The Portrait of Giulia da Varano della Rovere by Titian around 1545–1547 is currently kept at the Galleria Palatina e Appartamenti reali in the Palazzo Pitti, Florence. Some researchers believe that the painter also depicted the Duchess of Urbino in the painting Girl in a Fur from 1536–1538, now in the Kunsthistorisches Museum in Vienna and in the painting Venus of Urbino (completed in 1534, but not sold until 1538), now in the Galleria degli Uffizi in Florence. In the collections of the Gallery and Museum of the city of Camerino, there is a child portrait of Giulia da Varano by Dosso Dossi.
