= Duke of Camerino =

Papal and Italian title of nobility

Dukedom of Camerino
- Creation date: 1502
- Created by: Pope Alexander VI and Cardinal council
- Peerage: Vatican and Italy
- First holder: Cesare Borgia
- Present holder: House of Borgia

The title of Duke of Camerino is a noble title within the Papal peerage. It was created in 1503, under the apostolic authority of Pope Alexander VI and the council of cardinals, by elevating the ancient Marquisate of Camerino, which was part of the Duchy of Spoleto, to the rank of a duchy.

== History ==
Camerino was a Welf Marquissate, under the Varano family, its rulers participated in all conflicts between Ghibellines and Welfs. Meanwhile, Cesare Borgia was in Rome making his final plans for his intervention in Tuscany, in Camerino the Lord of Faenza, Astorre Manfredi, was found floating in the Tiber, he had been strangled on the orders of Borgia.

On 5 June Pope Alexander VI, excommunicated Giulio Cesare Varano, ruler of Camerino, accusing him of giving help to the enemies of the Church. On 23 June Cesare Borgia left Rome with an army of 8000 troops. On 20 July Cesare Borgia carrying the Apostolic authority, took Camerino and Giulio Cesare Varano prisoner. On 25 July and after Alexander VI and cardinal council received notice of Camerino's capture, Cesare Borgia is invested by Apostolic authority and by cardinal council as Duke of Camerino, being first time in history the denomination is used over the Camerino city and region of Camerino.

== Background ==
Cesare Borgia left the Duchy of Camerino to his brother Giovanni Borgia, who was later named Duke of Nepi and Duke of Pallestrina by Apostolic authority. The Duchy of Camerino remained in the hands of Giovanni Borgia until his death when it passed to another branch of the Borgia family by reason of patrimony.

In 1503 The pope returned Camerino to Juan Maria. In 1521 Juan was deposed by his brother Segismund, and he was brought back to power once again in 1522. In 1534 Camerino was integrated into the Duchy of Spoleto but the ruler and Lady of Camerino was deposed by the pope in 1535.

Camerino was used as a political ploy by popes who used it in pursuit of political alliances until 1555. Camerino was joined to the Papal States until 1860, year which Camerino passed to new Kingdom of Italy.

The title of Duke of Camerino remained in hands of Borgia family for a short period; nevertheless, it was used later by the Borgia family without permission of the popes (Giovanni Borgia and his descendants). Giovanni Borgia received rents of Camerino until his death, the dukedom right passed to a branch of the House of Borgia.

The title of Duke of Camerino was then held for another brief period by the Da Varano family (Giovanni Maria da Varano, Caterina Cybo, e Giulia da Varano) and Farnese family (Ottavio Farnese).

== Dukes of Camerino ==
- Cesare Borgia, Prince of Andria, Prince of Venafro, Duke of Valentinois, Duke of Romagna created by apostolic authority and cardinals council, Duke of Urbino, Count of Dyois, Duke of Camerino by apostolic authority and cardinal council and Lord of Imola, Forlì, Sassoferrato, Fermo, Fano, Cesena, Pesaro, Rimini, Faenza, Montefiore, Sant'Arcangelo, Verucchio, Catezza, Savignano, Meldola, Porto Cesenatico, Tossignano, Salaruolo, Monte Battaglia, Forlimpopoli, Bertinoro.
- Giovanni Borgia, Prince of Rome, Duke of Nepi, Duke of Camerino.
- House of Borgia. Title of Duke of Camerino is part of "Mayorazgo" instituted by Pope Alexander VI (Rodrigo Borgia).

Rulers under Papal domine

- Juan Maria Varano
- Segismund Varano
- Giovanni Maria da Varano
- Giulia da Varano
- Duke of Spoleto
- Ottavio Farnese, Duke of Parma
- Ercole Varano

Papal rulers

- From 1555 (Pope Paul III)
- Until 1860 (Pope Pius IX)

Kingdom of Italy

- Camerino was part of the Papal States until Pius IX formally handed the Kingdom of Italy, where it remained as a province until the creation of the Republic of Italy, which is part within the Province of Macerata, Marche region.

According to the laws of the Italian Republic, the titles of nobility of Italy ceased to exist with the fall of the monarchical regime.

== General sources ==
- John W. Barker and Christopher Kleinhenz. "Camerino, Duchy of", Medieval Italy: An Encyclopedia, ed. Christopher Kleinhenz (London and New York: Routledge, 2004), p. 173.
- John E. Law. "The Ending of the Duchy of Camerino", Italy and the European Powers: The Impact of War, 1500–1530, ed. Christine Shaw (Leiden and Boston: Brill, 2006), pp. 77–90.
- John E. Law. "The Da Varano Lords of Camerino as Condottiere Princes", Mercenaries and Paid Men, ed. John France (Leiden and Boston: Brill, 2008), pp. 89–104.
