= The Scarlet City =

1952 novel by Hella S. Haase

- First edition (Dutch)
- Author: Hella S. Haasse
- Original title: De scharlaken stad
- Translator: Anita Miller
- Language: Dutch
- Publisher: Academy Chicago Publishers (English)
- Publication date: 1952
- Publication place: Netherlands
- English publication date: 1990
- Pages: 367
- ISBN: 0-89733-349-7

The Scarlet City is a 1952 historical fiction novel written by Hella S. Haasse and originally published as De scharlaken stad. The novel was translated into English in 1990.

== Summary ==
The novel is set primarily in sixteenth century Italy, when Francis I attempted to establish the French in the country, just like his predecessors Charles VIII and Louis XII. Clement VII is Pope at the time that most of the events take place. It features Giovanni Borgia, the Infans Romanus of the House of Borgia. He has no clue who his true father is, and is determined to make a name of himself in order to overcome his unknown paternity.

Vittoria Colonna is also another prominent character featured in the story. In an unhappy marriage to the Marquis of Pescara, she finds solace in the teachings of Gian Matteo Giberti and Caterina Cibo, wife of Giovanni Maria Varano.

Other historical figures that appear throughout the story include Niccolò Machiavelli and Michelangelo Buonarotti.
