= San Pietro in Valle =

Abbey in Ferentillo, Umbria, Italy

Coordinates: 42.6454°N 12.8115°E

San Pietro in Valle is a medieval abbey in the comune (township) of Ferentillo in Umbria.

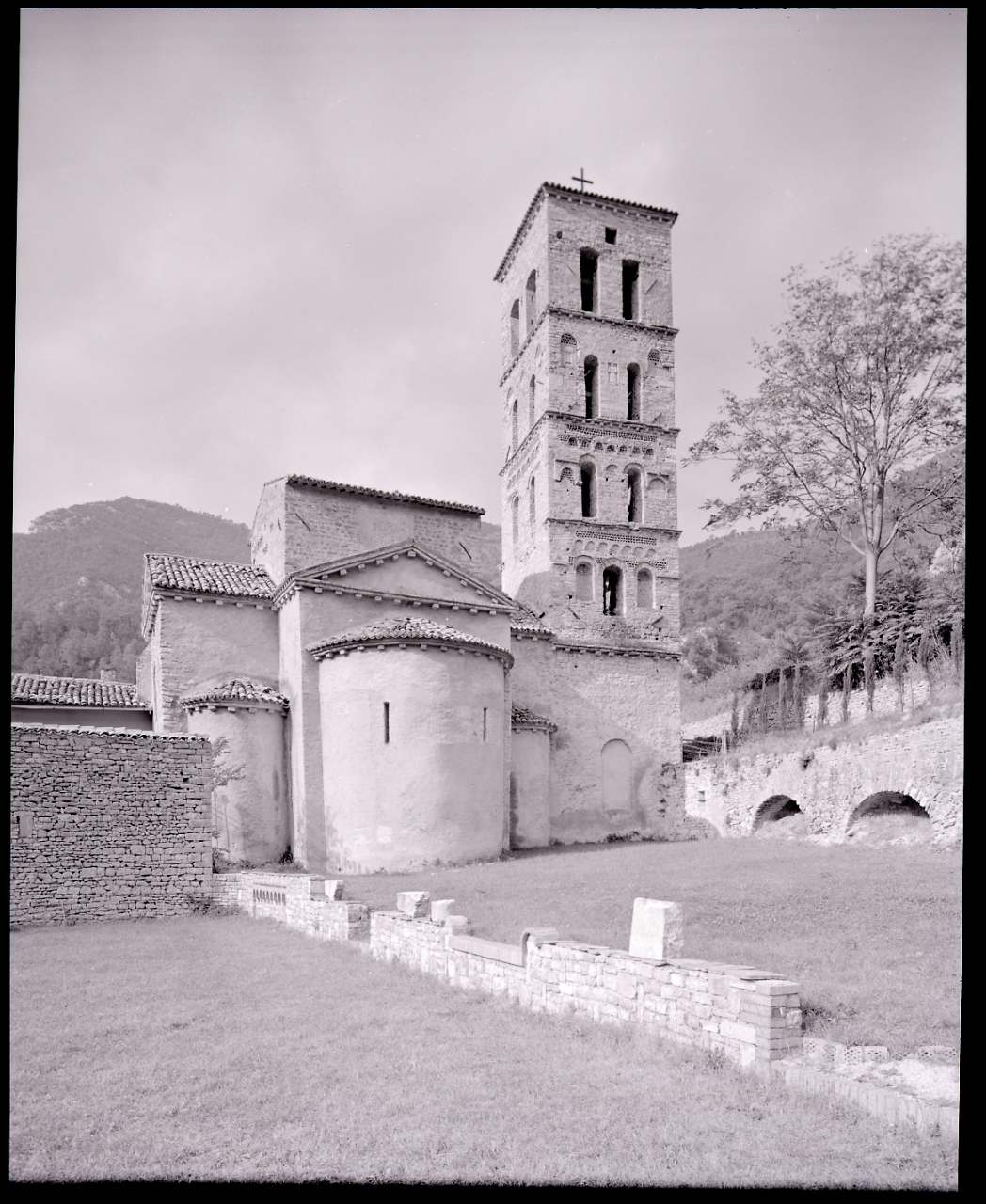
Apse and bell tower. 1967 photo by Paolo Monti.

The Romanesque church houses some particularly fine Roman sarcophagi; the walls of the nave are decorated with a large cycle of good Romanesque frescoes. The monastery buildings are private property and today house a luxury hotel.

== History ==
It was built in the 8th century by Faroaldo II, Duke of Spoleto, in the places where the hermits Lazzaro and Giovanni are said to have lived. According to a legend, the Duke of Spoleto saw in a dream the same Saint Peter who invited him to build a Benedictine monastery in the place of the present abbey. A few years later the duke gave up the title and became a monk in the abbey. Since then, the monastery was closely linked to the city of Spoleto, welcoming the remains of many of the dukes of the city.

At the end of the ninth century the monastery suffered, as it happened shortly after in Farfa, the sacking of the Saracens and was resurrected only in 996 at the behest of Otto III. In 1234 Pope Gregory IX assigns the abbey to the Cistercians in line with what happened in Lazio region under Pope Innocent III.

In 1484 Pope Innocent VIII gave the fief of the abbey to the Cybo family. Since 1917 the convent has passed into private hands and today, renovated, it is used as a hotel.

Pope Innocent VIII (Giovan Battista Cybo - i.e. Giobatta remembered as the Roman pontiff who began the merciless witch hunt), as mentioned, constituted a principality for his son Franceschetto Cybo, naming him, in addition to Duke of Spoleto, also Count of Ferentillo and therefore governor of the abbey. Franceschetto, who married Maddalena de 'Medici, was succeeded by his son Lorenzo Cybo, who married Ricciarda Malaspina, Marquess of Massa and Carrara. Alberico I Cybo was born from the marriage, who, after the death of his mother Ricciarda, also assumed (again at the behest of his mother) the surname of Malaspina. Alberico I Cybo-Malaspina thus became Marquis of Massa, Lord of Carrara, Count of Ferentillo governor of Monteleone di Spoleto and therefore also lord of the Abbey of San Pietro in Valle. The dominion fief of the Cybo Malaspina lasted until 1730 with Alderano Cybo. However, the abbey always had the command of the Spoleto noble Ancaiani until its final sale in 1907. The building is a national monument visited by many tourists for its works of art, such as the cycle of frescoes of the Roman school (1150) prior to Cavallini; the frescoes in the apse by the Eggi master of 1445.

== Art ==
The church, which has remained as a separate body from the abbey, has a single nave that dates back to the 7th century; the apse dates back to the 12th century. It preserves valuable medieval and Renaissance frescoes from the Umbrian school depicting scenes from the Old and New Testament.

Four sarcophagi preserved in the church date back to the 2nd century, which for the style and the representations suggest oriental artists:

- Sarcophagus with three boats (voyage to Hades).
- Sarcophagus of Faroaldo with Dionysus, Silenus, Pan and dancing Maenad.
- Sarcophagus of Cupid and Psyche
- Sarcophagus of the hunters.

=== The carved slab of Bear ===
The two slabs of the main altar, carved in bas-relief, are from the Lombard period. On the front of the altar runs an inscription in Latin, with curious mixed capital and lowercase characters: "Ilderico Dagileopa, in honor of St. Peter and for the love of St. Leo and St. Gregory, for the salvation of the soul (pro remedio animae) ". Ilderico was Duke of Spoleto between 739 and 742. The slab is also adorned with two bizarre figures, with their arms bent at 90 ° and raised upwards, with bare chest and wearing a short skirt. The figures are surrounded by stylized plant stems, which culminate in discs with inscribed crosses. One of the two figures wields a sort of stiletto, which some believe to be a chisel. This would suggest that the figure represents Ursus (Bear), the sculptor indicated as the author of the engraving by the inscription Ursus magester fecit ("The master Bear did it").

It is more difficult to understand who the other figure is: the kilt, a garment perhaps suited to the activity of a sculptor, does not suit the dignity of the duke. The raised arms have been interpreted as a ritual attitude and, in this case, the kilt would correspond to the cloth that is worn after baptism (which, in ancient times, was carried out by complete immersion). The pose would correspond to that of the contemporary bone altar of the Bishop Ludgero in Werden (hamlet of Essen) or to that of the sarcophagus of Bishop Agilbert in the crypt of Jouarre (France), slightly older. In a recent article published in the monthly "Medioevo" (Italian monthly magazine of medieval study) in February 2016, Elena Percivaldi also added other hypotheses, while confirming the interpretation of the scene as of a ritual nature.

This one of San Pietro in Valle is one of the very rare cases, in medieval art, in which the client can easily be distinguished from the artist, thanks to the fact that they are both mentioned.

== Bibliography ==
- Francesca Dell'Acqua, Ursus «magester»: uno scultore di età longobarda, in Enrico Castelnuovo, Artifex bonus - Il mondo dell'artista medievale, ed. Laterza, Roma-Bari, 2004.
- Ansano Fabbi, Abbazia di S. Pietro in Valle a Ferentillo, Abeto, 1972.
- Enzo Borsellino (1973). "Un'isola di cultura ottoniana nel cuore dell'Umbria". Spoletium. No. 18. Spoleto: Accademia spoletina. pp. 5–16.
- Anna Maria Orazi, L'Abbazia di Ferentillo: centro politico, religioso, culturale dell'alto Medio Evo, Bulzoni Editore, Roma, 1979.
- Elena Percivaldi, "Incanto in Valnerina", in "Medioevo" n. 229 (febbraio 2016), pp. 92-103.
- Giulia Tamanti (a cura di), Gli affreschi di San Pietro in Valle a Ferentillo. Le storie dell'Antico e del Nuovo Testamento, Electa, Napoli, 2003.
