= Portrait of Lorenzo Cybo =

Painting by Parmigianino

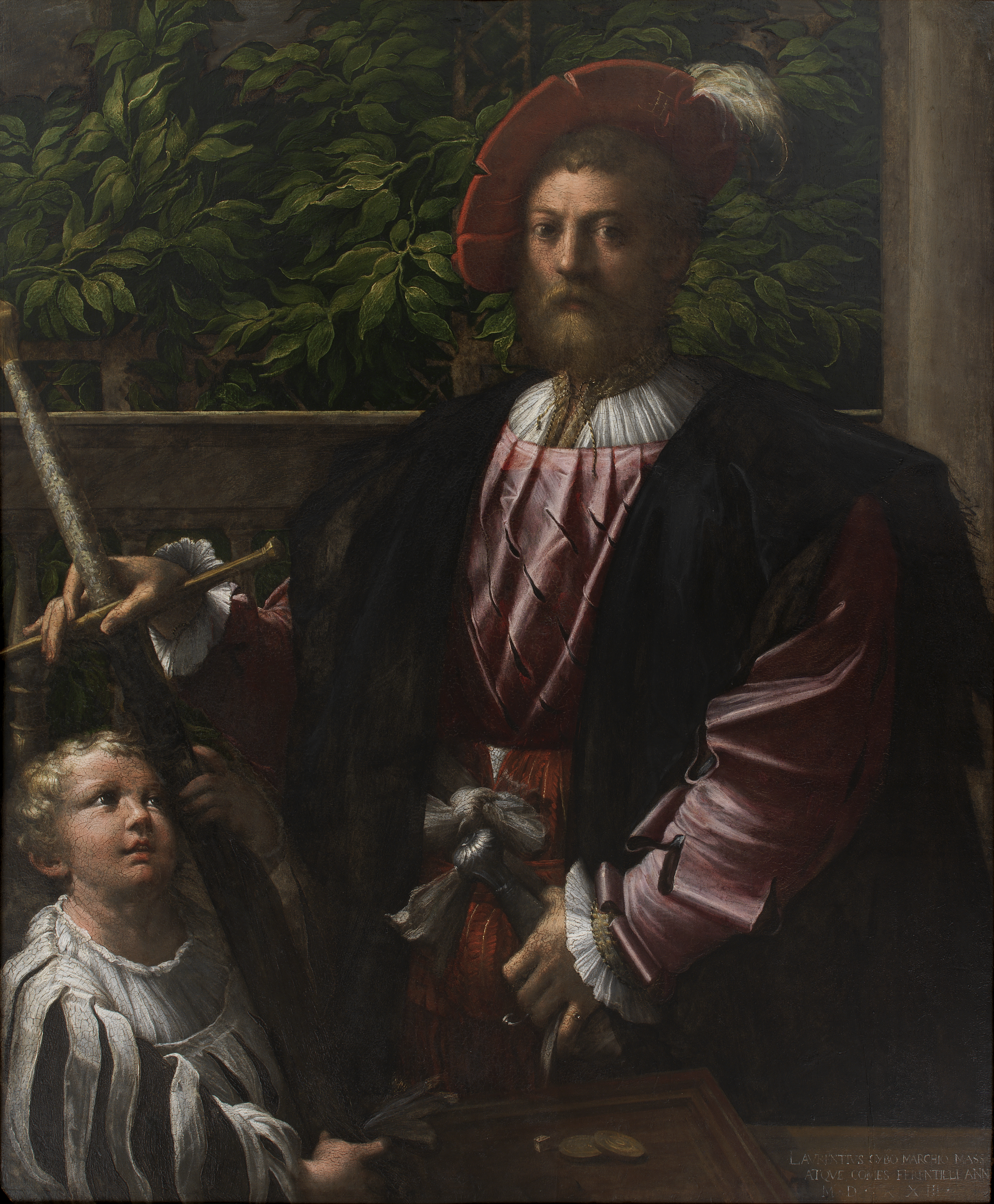
- Artist: Parmigianino
- Year: 1524
- Medium: Oil on panel
- Dimensions: 126 cm × 104 cm (50 in × 41 in)
- Location: National Gallery of Denmark, Copenhagen

Portrait of Lorenzo Cybo (1524) is a painting by the Italian late Renaissance artist Parmigianino. It is housed in the National Gallery of Denmark, in Copenhagen.

== History ==
The painting is mentioned by late Renaissance art biographer Giorgio Vasari as among those that Parmigianino executed during his sojourn in Rome. Lorenzo Cybo was a captain of the papal guards and a brother of cardinal Innocenzo Cybo, and at the time was 23/24, as specified in an inscription in the lower part of the painting: "Laurentius Cybo Marchio Massa atque Comes Ferentilli anno M.D.XXIII". The date 1523 is generally considered to be a mistake of the unknown man who added the inscription, since at the time Parmigianino was still in Emilia.

The portrait is known since 1749, when it was part of the collections of Cardinal Silvio Valenti Gonzaga, and is in fact included in a painting depicting his pictures by Giovanni Paolo Pannini. The whole collection was sold at Amsterdam in 1763 and in that occasion it was transferred to Denmark.

There are several known copies, including one at the Columbia Museum of Art in Columbia, South Carolina which once belonged to countess Frenfanelli Cybo.

== See also ==
- Portrait of Galeazzo Sanvitale

== Sources ==
- Viola, Luisa (2007). Parmigianino. Parma: Grafiche Step.
