= Cardinal Cybo =

Cardinal Cybo or Cibo may refer to:

- Lorenzo Cybo de Mari (died 1503), Italian cardinal
- Innocenzo Cybo or Cibo (1491–1550), Italian cardinal and archbishop of Genoa
- Camillo Cybo or Cibo (1681-1743), Italian cardinal, Protector of Santa Maria degli Angeli
- Alderano Cybo (1613–1700), Italian cardinal

== See also ==
- Cybo family, to which many of the cardinals belonged
