= Cybo =

Italian noble family

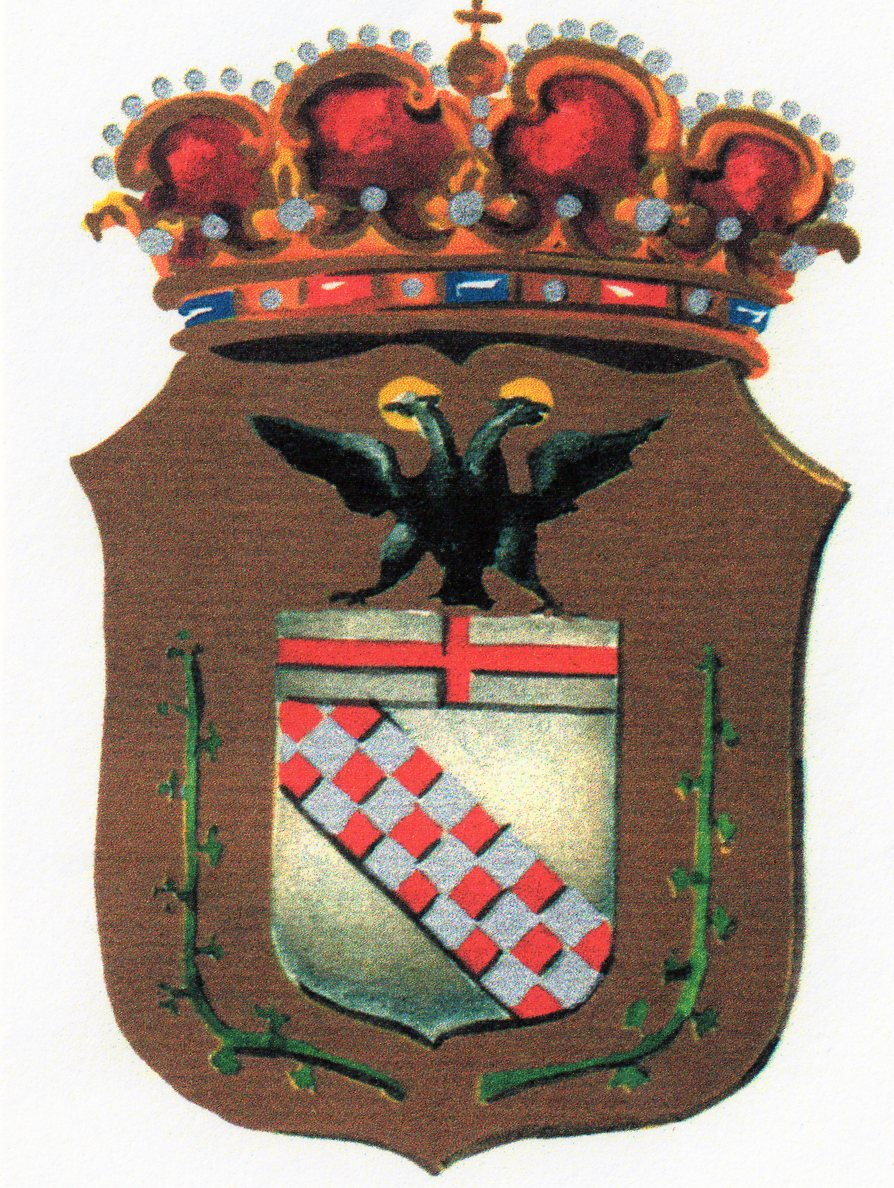
Coat of arms of the Cybo-Malaspina family

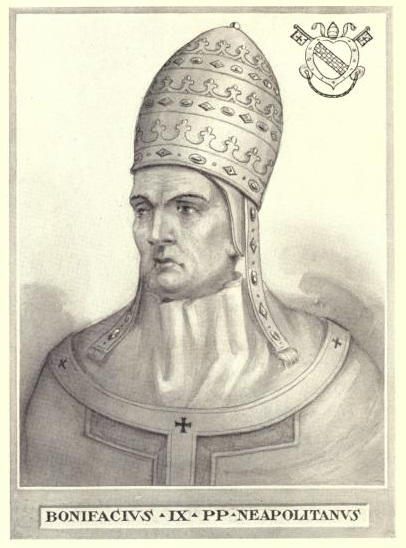
Pope Boniface IX

The House of Cybo, Cibo or Cibei of Italy was an old and influential aristocratic family from Genoa of Greek origin that ruled the Duchy of Massa and Carrara.

== History ==
They came to the city in the 12th century. In 1528 the Cybos formed the 17th "Albergo", a union of noble families of Genoa. The family divided into many branches, some living in Genoa, others in Naples by the name of Tomacelli. Its most famous members were Pope Boniface IX and Pope Innocent VIII.

The Cybo married with the most famous Italian families including Medici of Tuscany, Della Rovere of Urbino and Este of Modena and had a blood relationship with the banking family Altoviti. Innocent VIII was the uncle of La Papessa Dianora Cybo Altoviti. Her son Bindo Altoviti was one of the most influential bankers and patron of the arts of the Renaissance as well as a close ally of his cousin Cardinal Innocenzo Cybo.

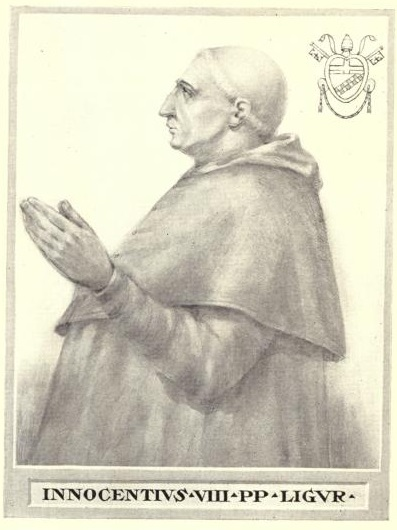
Pope Innocent VIII.

Innocent VIII's natural son, later legitimized, was Franceschetto Cybo, son in law to Lorenzo Il Magnifico de' Medici and brother-in-law to Pope Leo X. He was given by his father the title of Count of the Lateran Palace. Later Pope Julius II award him with the title Duke of Spoleto. His son Lorenzo Cybo, married Ricciarda Malaspina and became co-ruling marquis of Massa and Carrara, founding the Cybo-Malaspina branch, later elevated to the dukes of Massa and Carrara.

== Notable members ==
Notable members from the 15th century to the 19th century include:

- Lanfranco Cybo, consul of Genoa 1241; one of the first known members
- Guglielmo il Buono Cybo, palatine count of the Holy Roman Empire 1260, admiral of the Genoan fleet
- Pope Boniface IX. (Pietro Tomacelli Cybo) (1350–1404)
- Leonardo Cybo, Italian cardinal
- Angelo Cybo, Italian cardinal
- Arano Cybo (1377–1457) Viceroy of Naples and Count of Gragnano
- Pope Innocent VIII (Giovanni Battista Cybo) (1432–1492)
- Franceschetto Cybo (1450 – 1519) duke of Spoleto, illegitimate son of Pope Innocent VIII, brother-in-law to Pope Leo X
- Lorenzo Cybo Malaspina (1500–1549) was an Italian general, duke of Ferentillo.
- Lorenzo Cybo de Mari (died 1503), Italian cardinal
- Innocenzo Cybo (1491–1550), Italian cardinal
- Gherardo Cybo (1512–1600), colonel of the papal army, a famous naturalist.
- Giulio Cybo (1525–1548) Marquis of Massa, cousin of Cosimo I de' Medici, executed in 1548 for conspiring against Andrea Doria
- Alberico I Cybo-Malaspina (1554–1623)
- Alderano Cybo (1613–1700), Italian cardinal
- Carlo I Cybo-Malaspina (1623–1662)
- Alderano I Cybo-Malaspina, Duke of Massa, Prince of Carrara (1690–1731)
- Maria Teresa Cybo-Malaspina, (1725–1790), daughter of Alderano I, princess of Carrara, wife of Ercole III d'Este, Duke of Modena and mother of Maria Beatrice d'Este, Duchess of Massa-Carrara, who married Archduke Ferdinand of Austria. Massa was united with Modena upon Maria Beatrice's death in 1829
