= Claude de Seyssel =

Savoyard jurist and humanist

Most Reverend Claudio di Seyssel
- Archbishop of Turin
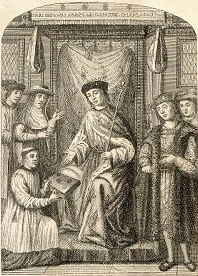
- Portrait of Claude de Seyssel presenting to King Louis XII of France the French translation of the book by Thucydides.
- Church: Catholic Church
- Archdiocese: Archdiocese of Turin
- In office: 1517–1520
- Predecessor: Innocenzo Cibo
- Successor: Innocenzo Cibo
- Previous post: Bishop of Marseille (1511–1517)

Personal details
- Born: 1458 Aix-les-Bains, France
- Died: 1 Jun 1520 (age 62) Turin, Italy

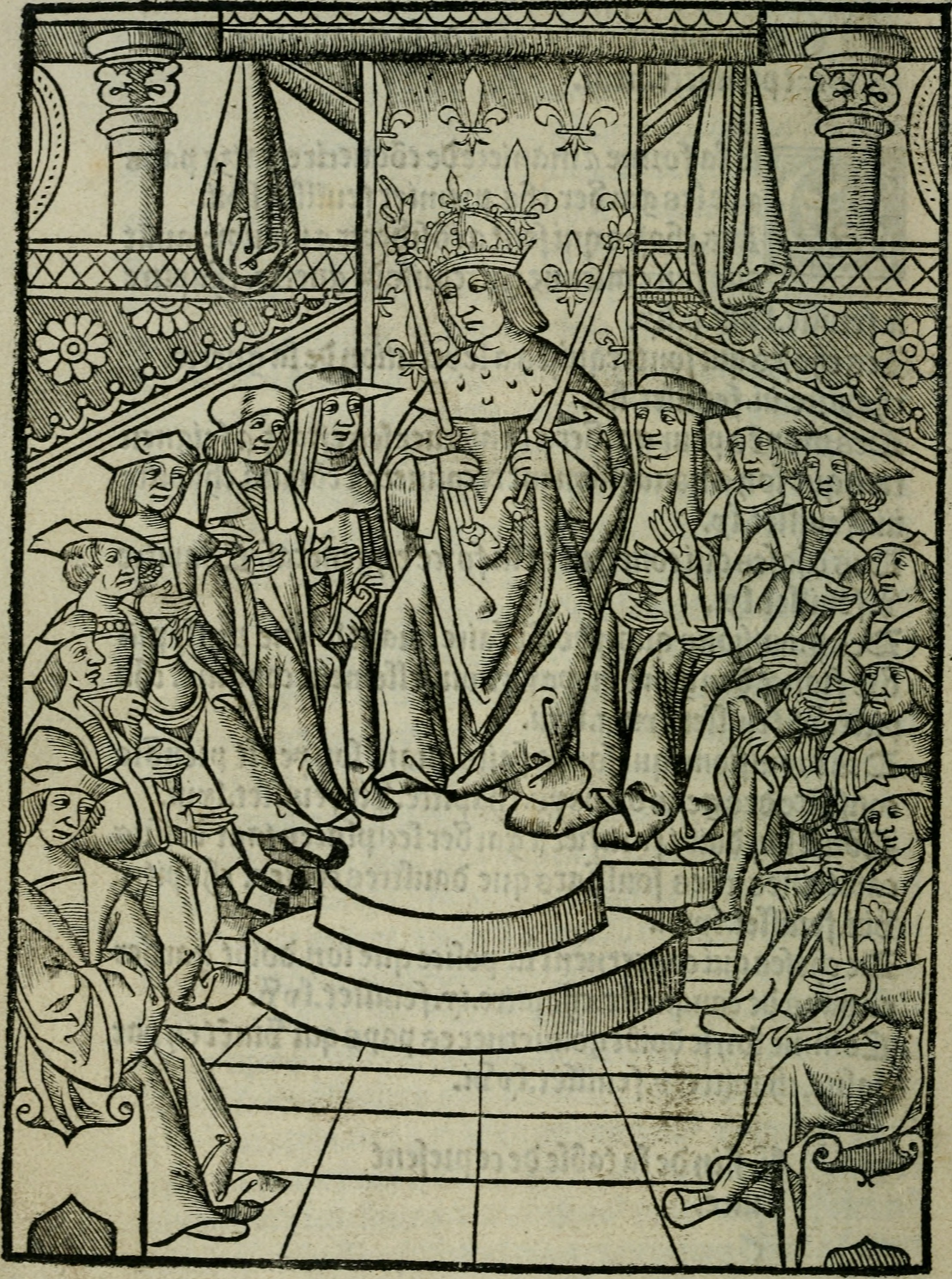
Image from La Grande Monarchie de France, Paris, 1519

Claude de Seyssel (Italian:Claudio di Seyssel) (died 1520) was a Savoyard jurist and humanist, now known for his political writings. He wrote La Grande Monarchie de France as a supporter of the French crown, in the person of Louis XII. Written around 1515, in French, it was published 1519; it supports hereditary monarchy. A Latin translation De Republica Galliae was printed in 1548 in Strasbourg.

== Biography ==
Seyssel was born in Aix-les-Bains as the bastard son of Claude de Seyssell, marshall of Savoy. He studied law and theology in Chambéry, Turin and Pavia. He graduated in 1485 and started teaching at the university of Turin. In 1499, he became a counsellor to King Louis XII of France, and was charged with various embassies to Italy and England. He praised the French king in Histoire singuliere de Louis XII (A Biography of Louis XII) (1508) and in Les louanges de Louis XII (In Praise of the King)(1509). To extricate himself from the dispute opposing Louis XII to Pope Julius II, he withdrew for a while from politics; in 1512, however, he went back to Rome to present his credentials to the new pope, Leo X. This was the apex of his diplomatic career. After the death of Louis XII in 1515, he gave up politics. The same year he was made bishop of Marseille.

His best-known work, written at the instigation of King Francis I of France, was La grant monarchie de France (1518). He is considered as one of the best examples of French political thinking in the early 16th century. Seyssel had a high regard toward the French monarchy and constitution. He thought the power wielded by the monarch was both controlled and balanced, being limited by religion, existing laws and justice. He discussed "estates", or social class as well, dividing society into the nobility, a composite class of merchants and bureaucrats, and a third class of producers and lower-ranking merchants. His ideas were very influential in the 16th century. Later French thinkers adopted a different stance and distanced themselves from his beliefs.

He was made Archbishop of Turin, in 1517, through the king's influence.

He also wrote on the Salic law, composed propaganda after the French victory over the Venetians, and worked as a translator of ancient historians, including Appianus of Alexandria.

== Bibliography ==
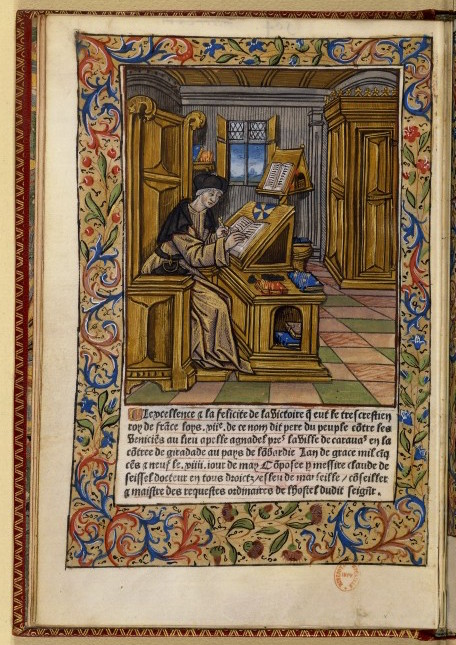
Portrait of Claude de Seyssel, while writing; 1st sheet of La Victoire du Roy contre les Véniciens.

- Speculum feudorum, Milano 1508.
  - Speculum feudorum (in Latin). Basel: Thomas Guarin. 1566.
- La Victoire du Roy contre les Véniciens, Paris, Antonie Vérard, 1510.
- La grant monarchie de France, A Paris, pour Regnault, 1519.
- Adversus errores et sectam Valdensium disputationes, Parisiis, in aedibus Reginaldi Chaudiere, 1520.
- Thucydide, L'Histoire de la guerre, qui fut entre les Peloponnesiens et Atheniens, translatee en langue Francoyse par feu messire Claude de Seyssel, A Paris, en l'hostel de maistre Iosse Badius, 1527.
- Eusebe Cesarien, L'Histoire ecclesiastique translatee de Latin en Francois par messire Claude de Seysse, A Paris, par maistre Geofroy Tory de Bourges, 1532.
- Appian Alexandrin, Des Guerres des Rommains livres XI, assavoir le Libyque, le Syrien, le Parthique, le Mithridatique, le Illyrien, le Celtique et cinq des Guerres civiles. Le tout traduict en Francoys par feu m. Claude de Seyssel, A Lyon, pour Antoine Constantin, 1544.
- Trogue Pompee, Les Histoires uniuerselles, abbregees par Iustin historien, traslatees de Latin en Francois par Messire Claude de Seyssel, A Paris, de l'Imprimerie de Michel de Vascosan, 1559.

Catholic Church titles
| Preceded by Jean Allardeau | Bishop of Marseille; 1511–1517 | Succeeded by Innocenzo Cibo |
| Preceded by Innocenzo Cibo | Archbishop of Turin; 1517–1520 | Succeeded by Innocenzo Cibo |
