= Giovanni Maria Sforza =

Most Reverend Giovanni Maria Sforza
- Archbishop of Genoa
- Church: Catholic Church
- Archdiocese: Archdiocese of Genoa
- In office: 1498–1513
- Predecessor: Paolo di Campofregoso
- Successor: Innocenzo Cybo

Personal details
- Died: 1513 Genoa, Italy

Giovanni Maria Sforza (died 1513) was a Roman Catholic prelate who served as Archbishop of Genoa (1498–1513).

== Biography ==
He was born in 1461 in Milan as the son of Francesco I Sforza and Brigida Caimi.

On 25 March 1498, he was appointed during the papacy of Pope Alexander VI as Archbishop of Genoa. He served as Archbishop of Genoa until his death in 1513.

== External links and additional sources ==
- Cheney, David M. "Archdiocese of Genova {Genoa}". Catholic-Hierarchy.org. (for Chronology of Bishops) ^{[self-published]}
- Chow, Gabriel. "Metropolitan Archdiocese of Genova (Italy)". GCatholic.org. (for Chronology of Bishops) ^{[self-published]}

Catholic Church titles
Preceded by Paolo di Campofregoso	Archbishop of Genoa; 1498–1513	Succeeded by Innocenzo Cybo
