= Caterina Cybo =

Italian ruler (1501–1557)

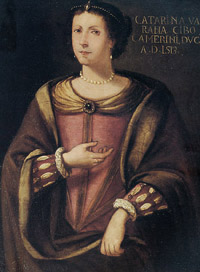
Luigi Valeri ritratto di Caterina Cybo, sec. XVIII

Caterina Cybo (13 September 1501 – 17 February 1557) was an Italian ruler. She was the daughter of Maddalena de Medici and Franceschetto Cybo and served as regent of the Duchy of Camerino from 1527 to 1535 during the minority of her daughter Giulia da Varano. She was also a follower of the Italian religious reformist movement of the 16th century.

She was born in Ponzano and was a granddaughter of Lorenzo de Medici.

In 1527, her husband, Duke Giovanni Maria of Camerino, died of the plague. Following his death, Caterina fought to retain control of the duchy and defend her daughter's right to inherit it.
