= Duchy of Massa and Carrara =

1473–1836 duchy in northwestern Tuscany, Italian Peninsula

Coordinates: 44°02′N 10°08′E

Duchy of Massa and Principality of Carrara Ducato di Massa e Principato di Carrara (Italian)
- 1664–1796; 1814–1836
- Flag Coat of arms
- Motto: Libertas (Latin) Freedom
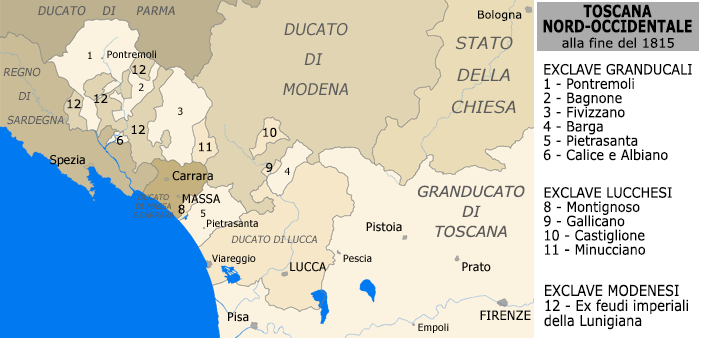
- Northern Tuscany in 1815.
- Capital: Massa; Carrara
- Common languages: Italian
- Religion: Roman Catholicism
- Government: Monarchy
- Monarch
  - 1473–1481: Giacomo I Malaspina (first)
  - 1790–1829: Maria Beatrice d'Este (last)
- Historical era: Modern era
  - Established: 22 February 1664
  - French rule: 10 May 1796–30 May 1814
  - Francis IV annexes the Massa and Carrara territories to the Duchy of Modena and Reggio: 14 November 1836
Preceded by
Principality of Massa
Marquisate of Carrara
Cispadane Republic
Succeeded by
Cispadane Republic
Principality of Lucca and Piombino
Duchy of Modena and Reggio
- Today part of: Italy

The Duchy of Massa and Principality of Carrara (Italian: Ducato di Massa e Principato di Carrara) was a small state that controlled the towns of Massa and Carrara from 1473 until 1836.

== History ==
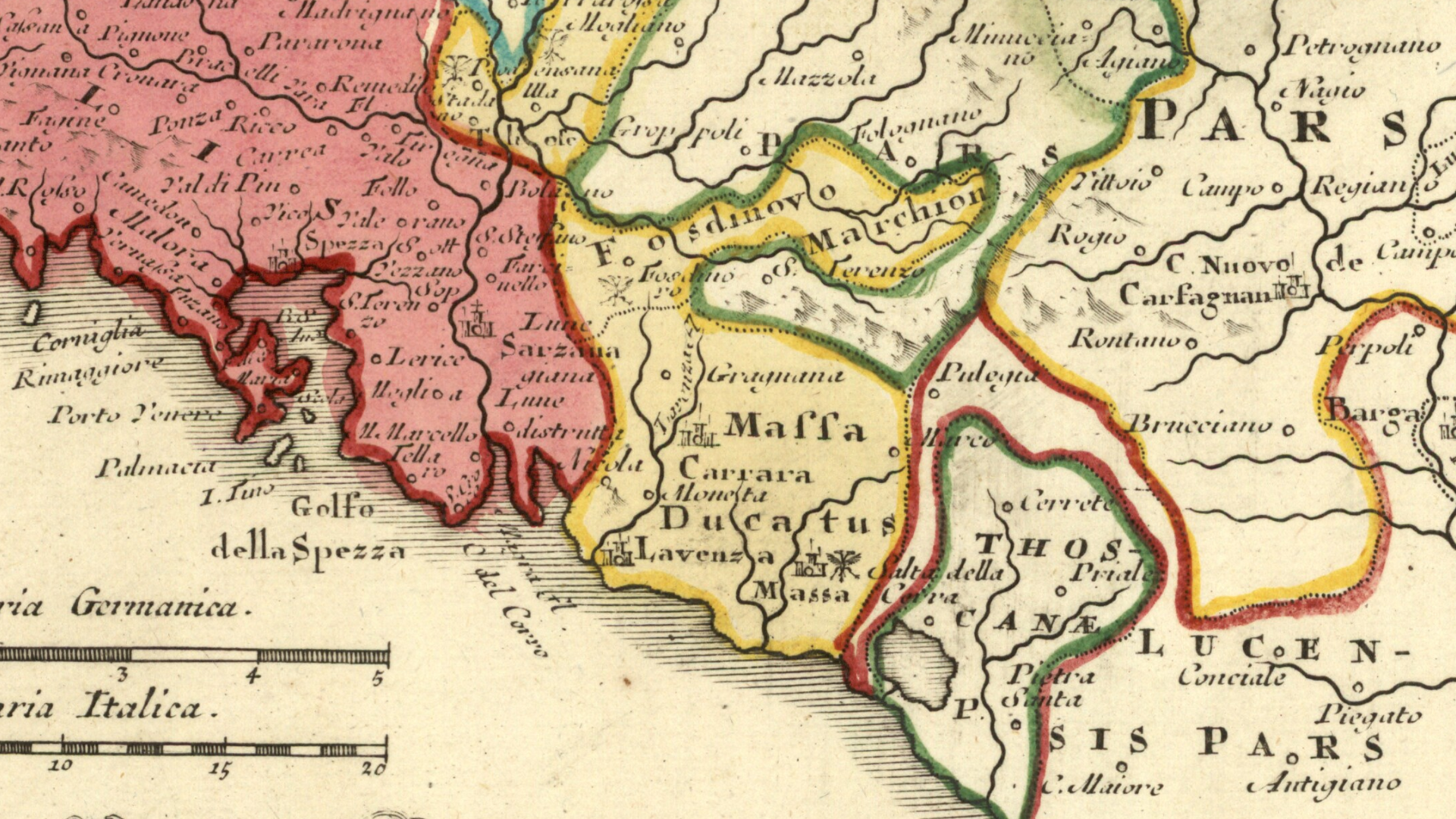
Early 18th century map showing the Duchy of Massa and Carrara

Although the city of Massa had already known its maximum medieval splendor in the 11th century with the Marquisate of Massa and Corsica ruled by the Obertenghi family, the original nucleus of the state was officially born on 22 February 1473 with the purchase of the Lordship of Carrara by the Lordship of Massa in the time headed by the Marquis Jacopo Malaspina, who obtained it from Count Antoniotto Fileremo of Genoa, progenitor of the Fregoso line. The noble title of this branch of the Malaspina family therefore became that of Marquises of Massa and lords of Carrara.

From the purchase of the Carrara territory onwards, the seat of Jacopo Malaspina, one of the sons of Antonio Alberico I Malaspina, formerly Marquis of Fosdinovo, was located in the city of Carrara, but due to the frequent clashes with the French invaders who occurred often, he and his successors moved to Massa.

Within two generations the Malaspina family died out in male descent and Ricciarda, Iacopo's eldest surviving granddaughter, married in 1520 with Lorenzo Cybo, member of the House of Cybo, an old and influential family of Genoese aristocrats. Pope Innocent VIII (Lorenzo's grandfather) belonged to it and they were related to the Medici (Maddalena de' Medici was Lorenzo's mother, and her brother, Pope Leo X, had himself arranged the Malaspina marriage, together with Lorenzo's elder brother, Cardinal Innocenzo Cybo) . From the marriage the new Cybo-Malaspina family originated, which was to rule the states of Massa and Carrara until 1829. The marriage, however, was rather stormy: the two spouses disputed for a long time the governance of the marquisate and in 1529 Ricciarda managed to obtain from emperor Charles V the investiture of the marquisate, in derogation of the Salic law, for herself, for her male descendants in order of primogeniture or, in their absence, also for females.

At the end of long struggles for control over the marquisate, Giulio, the eldest son of Lorenzo and Ricciarda, was beheaded in Milan, in 1548, by order of Charles V on charges of treason. Thus, it was up to his younger brother, Alberico I Cybo-Malaspina (in fact, likely fathered by Cardinal Cybo), to succeed their mother as Marquis of Massa and Carrara in 1553. Under his 70-year rule the fiefdom experienced a very favorable period of development, thanks also to the advantageous economic situation in the marble market, which was in great demand by the Renaissance courts of the time. Alberico I, aware that his statelet was surrounded by more powerful and influential neighbors, continued his mother's policy of alignment with the Holy Roman Empire of Charles V of Habsburg, who officially confirmed his investiture of the fiefdom in 1554. In 1568 Massa and Carrara were elevated respectively to marquisate and to principality by the Emperor Maximilian II. In 1664, during the rule of Alberico II, Leopold I of Habsburg raised the Principality of Massa to the rank of duchy and the Marquisate of Carrara to a principality.

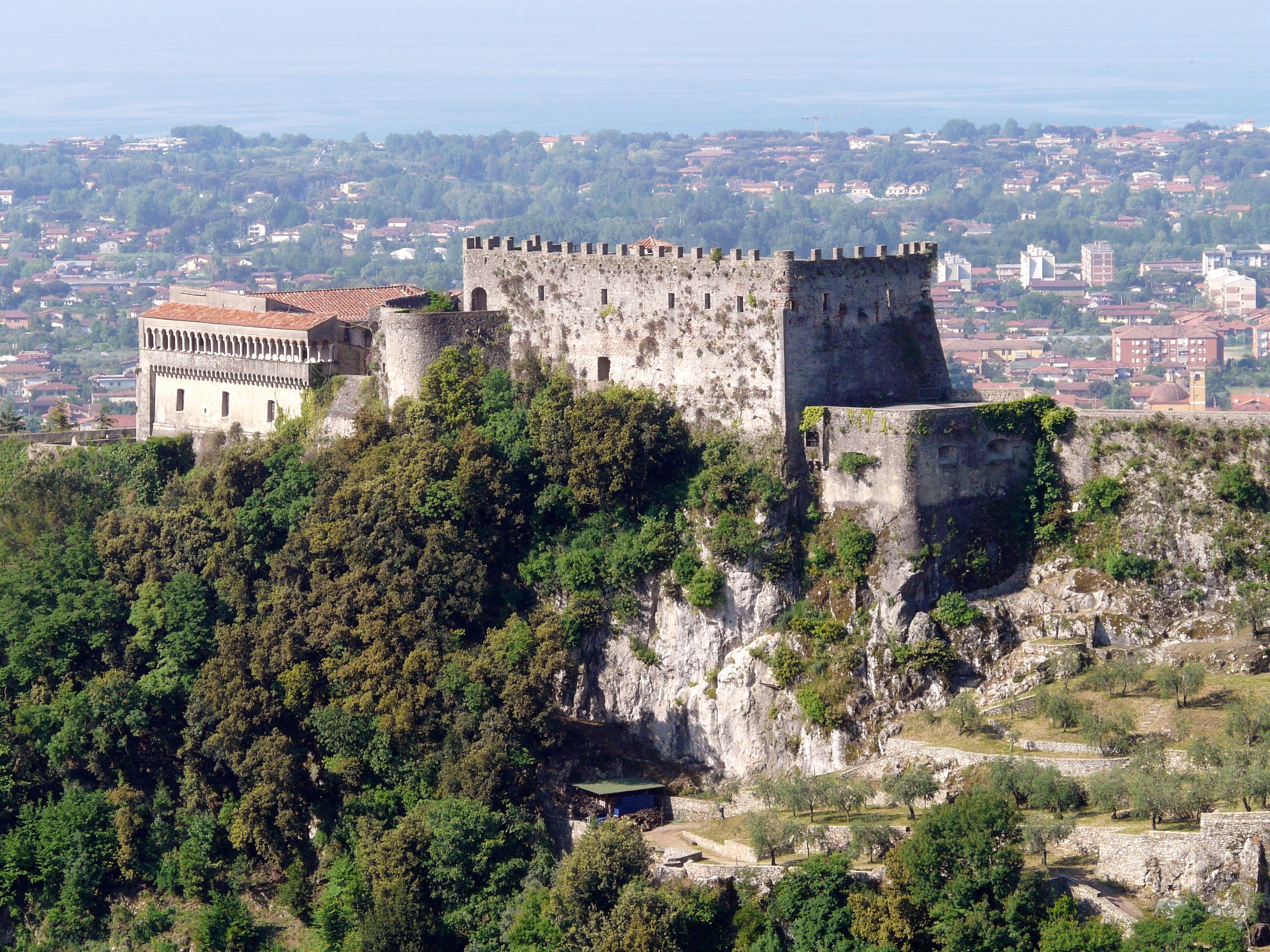
Malaspina Castle, the main seat of the House of Malaspina, rulers of the Massa and Carrara state before 1563

In 1741 Maria Teresa Cybo-Malaspina, the last scion of the family, married Ercole Rinaldo d'Este, the only male heir of the Duchy of Modena and Reggio. Their only surviving child, Maria Beatrice d'Este, was thus the last descendant of both families, but, as a woman, she was not entitled to succeed under Salic law and was only permitted to take over the Duchy of Massa and Carrara thanks to the exemption wrested almost three centuries earlier by her indomitable and often reviled ancestor, Ricciarda Malaspina.

In 1796 the Este were deprived of their possessions by the troops of Napoleon. The latter incorporated the territory into the Cispadane Republic, which later became the Cisalpine Republic. During this period the region was briefly disputed against Napoleon by the Austrians of the anti-French coalition (1799) and experienced a rapid succession of different administrative systems, more or less provisional. As a last administrative change, in 1806, the French emperor assigned the Duchy of Massa and Carrara to the Principality of Lucca and Piombino, governed by his older sister Elisa Bonaparte Baciocchi. In 1809 the honorary title of Duke of Massa di Carrara was granted by Napoleon to his former Minister of Police, Claude Ambroise Régnier.

During the Napoleonic domination Maria Beatrice d'Este (who had succeeded her mother in 1790) was forced to take refuge in Vienna with the family of her husband, Ferdinand Karl, Archduke of Austria-Este, uncle of Emperor Francis II, and pretender to the ducal throne of Modena and Reggio. With the fall of the Napoleonic regime, the Congress of Vienna again assigned to Maria Beatrice the ancestral duchy of which she had been dispossessed. The imperial fiefs in the Lunigiana (starting with the Marquisate of Fosdinovo), which were not re-established, were also bestowed upon her, but she handed them over almost immediately to her son and heir Francis IV of Austria Este, who had been appointed Duke of Modena and Reggio.

In 1829, on the death of Maria Beatrice, the Duchy of Massa and the Principality of Carrara were annexed by her son and heir to the Duchy of Modena and Reggio. In 1860, with the deposition, the previous year, of Francis V, the Duchy of Modena and Reggio (also including the territories of Massa and Carrara) was annexed to the Kingdom of Sardinia, of which it constituted the Province of Massa-Carrara.

== Rulers of Massa and Carrara ==
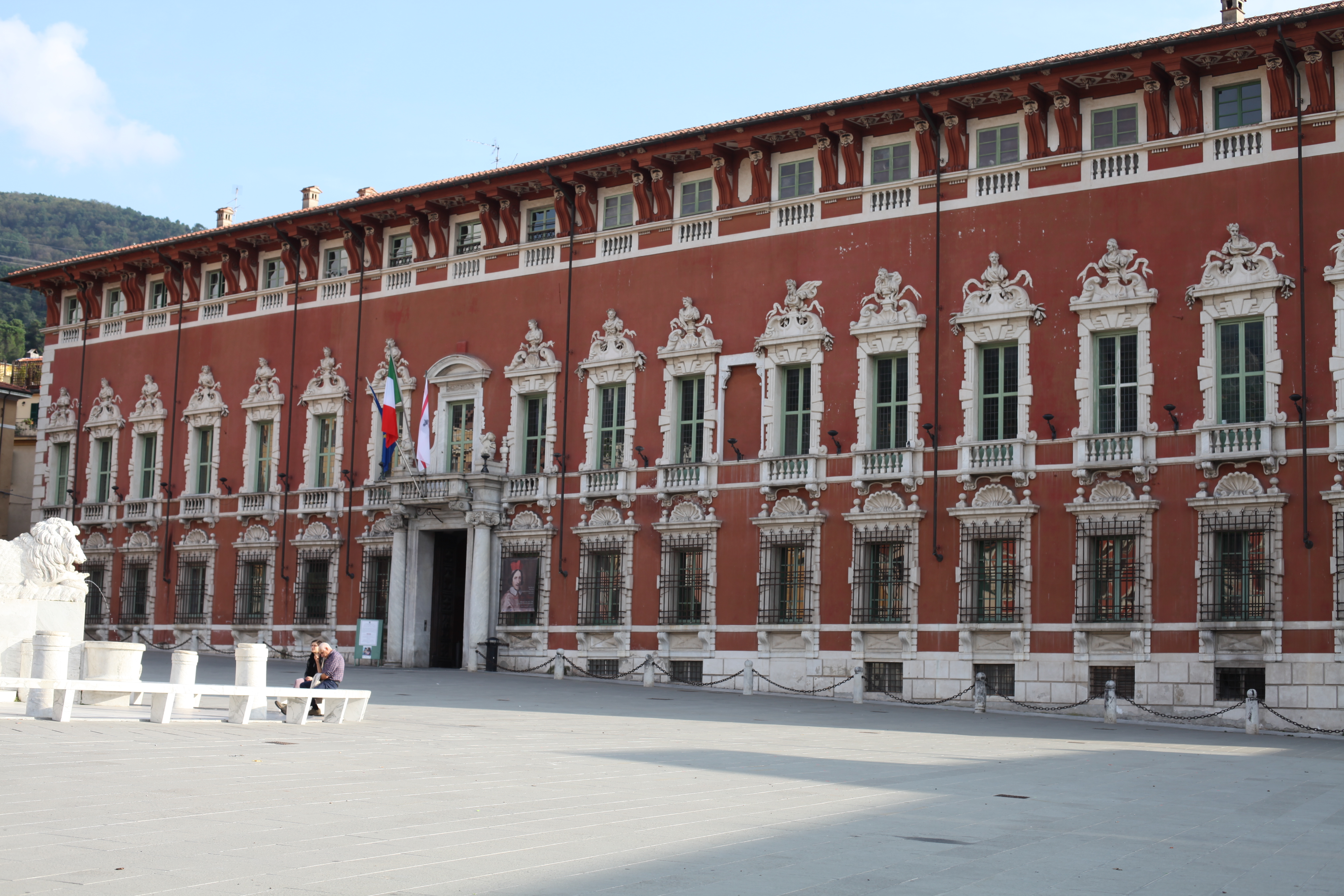
The Ducal Palace in Massa, the principal residence thereafter

- Giacomo I Malaspina (1445–1481) Marquis of Massa and Lord of Carrara since 1473
- Alberico II Malaspina (1481–1519)
- Ricciarda Malaspina (1519–1546 and 1547–1553)
- Giulio Cybo (1546–1547)
- Alberico I Cybo-Malaspina (1554–1623) Marquis of Massa and Lord of Carrara from 1558, then Prince of Massa and Marquis of Carrara from 1568
- Carlo I Cybo-Malaspina (1623–1662)
- Alberico II Cybo-Malaspina (1662–1690) Duke of Massa and Prince of Carrara from 1664
- Carlo II Cybo-Malaspina (1690–1710)
- Alberico III Cybo-Malaspina (1710–1715)
- Alderamo Cybo-Malaspina (1715–1731)
- Maria Teresa Cybo-Malaspina (1731–1790)
- Maria Beatrice (1790–1796) Duchess of Massa and Princess of Carrara
- Annexation by the Cispadane Republic, Cisalpine Republic, Italian Republic, Kingdom of Italy and Principality of Lucca and Piombino following the invasion of Napoleon (1796–1806)
- Maria Beatrice (1815–1829) Duchess of Massa and Princess of Carrara
- Francis IV, Duke of Modena (1829–1846): in 1836 the duchy became a simple province of the Este States
- Francis V, Duke of Modena (1846–1859)

== Policy and economy ==
The merge of the Malaspina family with the Cybo family brought the territory to a rather lavish court life. In the conduct of foreign policy the Cybo-Malaspina maintained a role as an intermediary between the Grand Duchy of Tuscany and the Republic of Genoa.

Alberico I brought large urban restructurations in the cities of Carrara and Massa, mainly for prestige reasons. Both cities were equipped with new city walls - with representative functions, rather than military, since the policy of the territory was not expansionist - and new ducal palaces. In Carrara was established the Office of Marble (1564), to regulate the marble mining industry.

The city of Massa, in particular, saw much of its plan redesigned (new roads, plazas, intersections, pavings) in order to make it worthy of an Italian country's capital.

The War of Spanish Succession (1701–1714) was the beginning of the period of deep economic crisis for the duchy. The Empire punished with heavy fines the Cybo-Malspina, who had given hospitality to French troops on its territory. Already Alberich III, but especially Alderamo, found themselves forced to sell many city goods. Alderamo arrived to force people to buy food at a premium, and also because of the luxurious and extravagant lifestyle of the nobleman, the economics of the Duchy was brought to its knees. The financial situation recovered only by dynastic union between the families of the Malaspina and the Este, achieved with the marriage of Maria Teresa and Ercole d'Este in 1741.

From that date, the Duchy of Massa and Carrara gradually lost its political autonomy, going to gravitate more and more closely into the city of Modena sphere of influence. Under the domination of the Este, the Duchy of Massa Carrara rose to occupy a strategic position, in that it provided a sea outlet to the hinterland domains and promised an easier trade route. Already under Maria Teresa road links between the Duchy of Modena and Reggio to Massa & Carrara were significantly improved. These road reform attempts include the construction of the Via Vandelli, starting as early as 1738.

In 1751, was made a first attempt for the excavation of a dock and the construction of a port in the city of Carrara. The port would have been functional to the trade and military activities of the Este, would have housed in a safe place the small fleet of the Duchy of Modena and, finally, would have been essential to free the marble exports from dependence of other nearby ports. The coast, however, had a tendency to silt up and after a few years the construction work had to be suspended.

In 1807 Napoleon's engineers built the important mail road to the Foce, to link the cities of Massa and Carrara through the inland hills. During the Napoleonic rule were also initiated other public works such as the bonification of the plains, the plantation of coastal pine trees to combat malaria and arrangement of river banks. These works were continued by Maria Beatrice and successors in subsequent decades. In 1821 the Este Land Registry was established, with the task of regulating and listing the properties of the inhabitants of the duchy.

The years following the annexation to the Duchy of Modena were particularly complex, both for the insurrectional riots that characterized the historical period, and for the economic crisis, which have long gripped the region. The rulers tried several times to exit the stagnation in promoting the construction of infrastructure to increase the volume of trade, but the lack of money often proves an insurmountable obstacle.

A second attempt to build the port of Carrara was entrusted by Duke Francis IV to the engineer Aschenden in 1830, but the project was never made for lack of funds. A dock loader, which came to be the first authentic port core of Carrara was built successfully only in 1851, thanks to the English engineer and tycoon William Walton. In 1846 the Count Francesco del Medico proposed to the Duke Francis V the construction of the Marble Railway of Carrara, to link the marble quarries to the sea and thereby facilitating the transport of blocks to the areas for sorting, loading, and shipping. This project was also suspended for lack of funds. The Marble Railway was finally built after the Italian unification (1871–1890).

In the last years of the duchy, an increasing number of clashes was seen between the liberals and the ducal government, especially in Carrara. The territory was chosen by Count Camillo Benso di Cavour and Napoleon III to organize popular anti-Austrian riots and give France an opportunity to intervene on the side of Piedmont in Italy, giving way to the Second Italian War of Independence.

== See also ==
- Claude Ambroise Régnier (1746–1814), made duc de Massa on 15 August 1809
