= Giovanni Borgia (Infans Romanus) =

Spanish priest

- Born: 1498
- Died: 1548 (aged 49–50)
- Noble family: House of Borgia

Giovanni Borgia (March 1498 – 1548), known as the Infans Romanus ("the Roman child"), was born into the House of Borgia. Speculations about the child's parentage involve either Lucrezia Borgia with her alleged lover, Perotto Calderon or Cesare Borgia, or Pope Alexander VI as his father. Cesare Borgia's biographer Rafael Sabatini says that the truth is fairly clear: Alexander fathered the child with an unknown Roman woman.

== Life ==
Though the actual parentage of Giovanni Borgia remains unclear, he was born in 1498

The purported lover of Lucrezia, Perotto Calderon and the child's alleged father was found dead floating in the Tiber alongside Lucrezia's maid in February of that same year. The implication being that the two knew too much. Likely this also spurred on the rumors of Lucrezia being his mother.

Pope Alexander VI issued two papal bulls, both dated to 1 September 1501, assigning different fathers to Giovanni Borgia. The second bull appears to supplement and correct the first. In the first, addressed to "Dilecto Filio Nobili Joanni de Borgia, Infanti Romano", the pope declared Giovanni Borgia to be a child of three years of age, the illegitimate son of Cesare Borgia and an unnamed woman. The second declared Giovanni Borgia instead to be the son of Pope Alexander VI himself and runs: "Since you bear this deficiency not from the said duke, but from us and the said woman, which we for good reasons did not desire to express in the preceding writing". The pope was forbidden by canon law to publicly recognize children and did not wish that Giovanni Borgia should suffer in his inheritance as a consequence.

Giovanni Borgia was supposed by many to be the child of Alexander and his mistress, Giulia Farnese. He appeared as a companion of Lucrezia Borgia, who named him as her younger half-brother. Pope Alexander VI, in two bulls excommunicating members of the Savelli and Colonna families and confiscating their properties, was able to name Giovanni Borgia as heir to the duchy of Nepi, a property important to the Borgia family. Giovanni Borgia was also named duke of Palestrina on 17 September 1501. Alessandro Farnese governed Camerino in the name of Giovanni.

Giovanni Borgia was passed from guardian to guardian. In 1508 he was with Isabella of Aragon at Bari. Eventually he ended up with Lucrezia Borgia in Ferrara. Giovanni Borgia held several other titles, including the signory of Vetralla.

He served as a minor functionary in the Papal Curia and at the court of France.

He had three daughters.

== Popular culture ==
Hella Haasse constructed a historical novel around the figure of Giovanni Borgia, The Scarlet City (1952).

In the fictionalized historical setting of Assassin's Creed, Giovanni Borgia is depicted as the love child of the star-crossed union between Lucrezia Borgia and Perotto Calderon, a courier who was secretly a member of the Assassins that were working to bring down the Borgias. Giovanni is born malformed and deemed likely to die in a few days, but is healed by a powerful artifact. He is raised in the Borgia household, with Cesare Borgia posing as his father and Lucrezia as his aunt. To flee the life Cesare is grooming him for, Giovanni runs away to join Francesco Vecellio, Calderon's understudy, in the Assassin Order. Thereafter Giovanni serves as an operative for the Assassins, having an affinity for artifacts of power. For example, in 1520, he poses as a chronicler on Hernán Cortés's first voyage to Mexico (witnessing the Night of Sorrow), where he obtains a crystal skull. In 1527, he encounters Paracelsus and assists in the creation of a philosopher's stone.

In the 2011 television series The Borgias, Giovanni is portrayed as the son of Lucrezia (portrayed by Holliday Grainger) and a young groom named Paolo, who is then murdered by her brother Juan, Duke of Gandia.
