= Cibo (artist) =

Italian antifascist street artist

- Born: Pier Paolo Spinazzé; 1982 (age 43–44)
- Occupation: Street artist
- Years active: 2008–present
- Known for: Murals covering neo-fascist graffiti

Pier Paolo Spinazzé (born 1982), also known by the pseudonym Cibo ([ˈtʃiːbo], Italian for "food"; sometimes styled CIBO), is an Italian antifascist and street artist who uses murals to cover neo-fascist graffiti in Verona. He began using his murals in this way after one of his classmates was killed by a group of neo-fascists; his art typically depicts Italian cuisine.

== Activity ==
Prior to 2008, Spinazzé painted murals of food items on empty walls in northern Italy. In 2008, a group of ultranationalists or neo-fascists killed one of Spinazzé's university classmates, leading him to decide to take action. Shortly afterward, he encountered fascist graffiti on a wall, and covered the wall with a mural depicting a Vienna sausage. Within a few days, new graffiti had been drawn over the mural, and he began adding various sauces to the sausage to cover each piece of new graffiti that appeared. He subsequently began painting murals over similar graffiti in and around Verona.

In June 2018, there was an uptick in neo-fascism and far-right ideology in Italy, and Spinazzé told Vice News that he had reached "a tipping point" and intended to eliminate all the neo-fascist and far-right graffiti he saw. This included swastikas and ethnic slurs as well as Celtic crosses.

In a November 2021 profile of Spinazzé by Reuters, one of his followers on Instagram (363,000 as of November 2021) alerted him to graffiti of racial slurs and swastikas in a tunnel on the edge of Verona. In roughly 15 minutes, he painted a Pizza Margherita and a Caprese salad over the slurs, covering a swastika with a large tomato. His social media followers frequently inform him about new graffiti so that he can cover it.

== Motivation ==
The important thing is to rediscover values that we may have forgotten, especially anti-fascism and the fight against totalitarian regimes that stem from the Second World War.

— Pier Paolo Spinazzé, Reuters

Spinazzé describes himself as an antifascist. He has stated that his motivation is not to challenge fascists directly, but rather to "overthrow the rampant and systematic acceptance of hate" in Verona. He is frequently threatened by far-right figures, and has received death threats, but has expressed an intent to remain active and invited other artists to join him.

== Characteristics ==
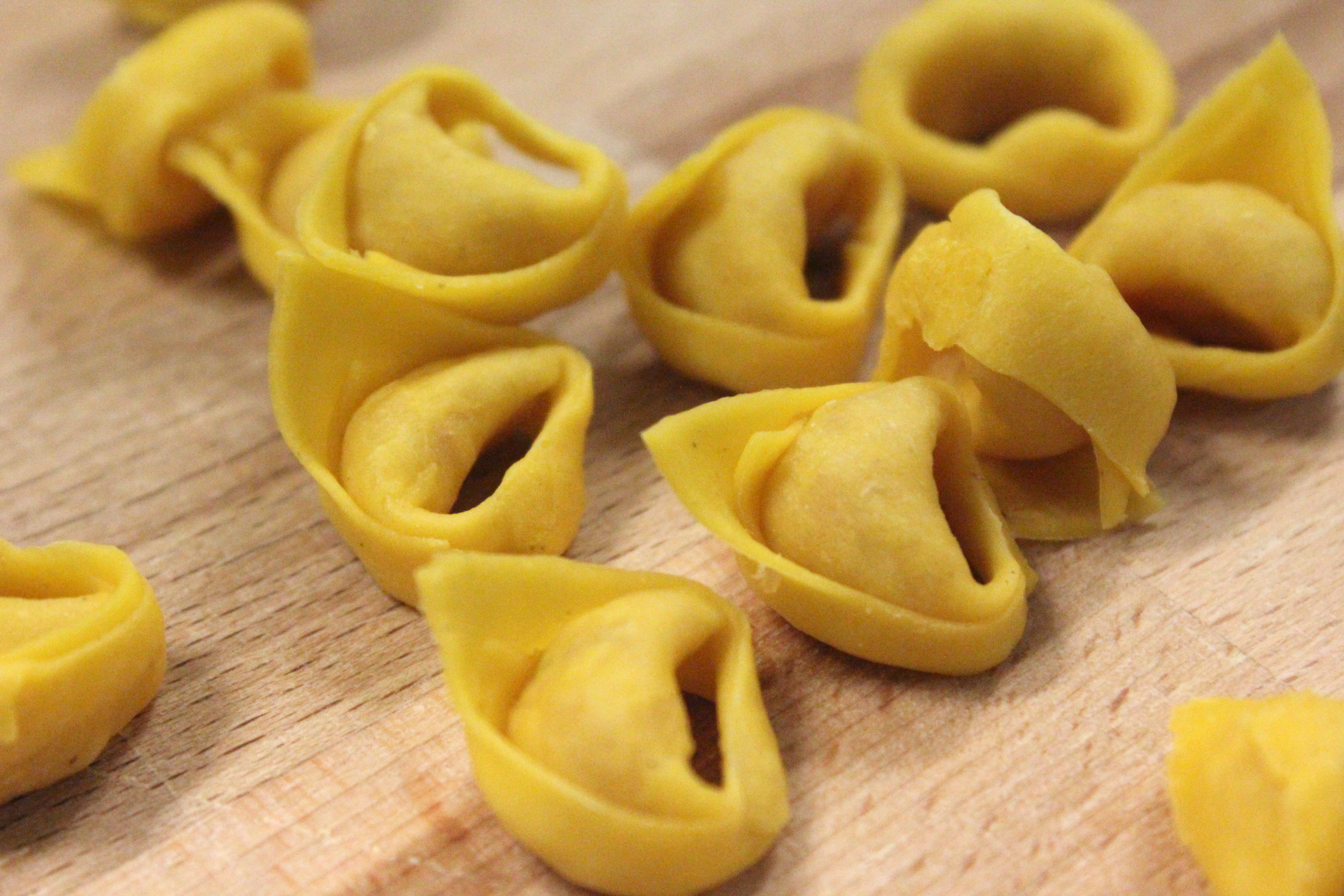
Tortellini (pictured) are a reoccurring visual motif in Cibo's art

Murals by Cibo typically depict Italian food. When painting, the artist generally wears a straw hat and a necklace made of cloth sausages. He often uses symbols across multiple murals, such as pumpkin tortellini, causing viewers to become aware that his art is covering up hate symbols when they see it.

== Personal life ==
As of October 2018, Spinazzé worked in the restaurant industry.
