= Alberico I Cybo-Malaspina =

Politician in Massa and Carrara (1534–1623)

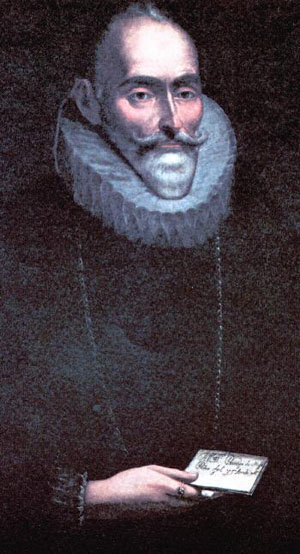
- Portrait of Alberico I Cybo-Malaspina

Marquis/Prince of Massa and Carrara
- Reign: 15 June 1553–18 January 1623
- Coronation: 15 June 1553
- Predecessor: Ricciarda Malaspina
- Successor: Carlo I Cybo-Malaspina
- Regent: None
- Born: 28 February 1534; Massa and Carrara
- Died: January 1623 (aged 88); Massa and Carrara
- Spouse: Elisabetta della Rovere; Isabella Do Capua
- Issue: 5
- House: Massa and Carrara
- Father: General Lorenzo Cybo
- Mother: Ricciarda Malaspina
- Religion: Catholic Christianity

Alberico I Cybo-Malaspina (28 February 1534 – 18 January 1623) was the first Prince of Massa and Marquis of Carrara. He was also the last Count (1553–1619) and the first Duke of Ferentillo (1619–1623).

Born in Genoa, Italy, he was the son of Lorenzo Cybo and Ricciarda Malaspina (although probably born of his mother's adultery with her brother-in-law, Cardinal Innocenzo Cybo), and was a descendant of Pope Innocent VIII and Lorenzo de' Medici.

In 1553 Alberico succeeded his mother as Marquis of Massa and Lord of Carrara, being later promoted, in 1568, to Prince and Marquis respectively He was married twice, first to Elisabetta della Rovere, daughter of Francesco Maria I della Rovere, Duke of Urbino by whom he had one son, Alderano Cybo-Malaspina; and second to Isabella di Capua, by whom he had three daughters and a son. He also fathered five natural children. Cybo-Malaspina died in Massa after having reigned, beloved and respected, for nearly 70 years. Since his son Alderano had predeceased him, it was his grandson Carlo who succeeded him in the principality.

== Sources ==
- Cozzetto, Fausto (2001). Lo stato di Aiello : feudo, istituzioni e società nel Mezzogiorno moderno. Napoli: Editoriale scientifica. ISBN 88-88321-16-0.
- Giumelli, Claudio; Raffo Maggini, Olga (1991). Il tempo di Alberico: 1553-1623 : Alberico I Cybo-Malaspina: signore, politico e mecenate a Massa e Carrara (in Italian). Pacini. OCLC 34815533.
- Tettoni, L. (28 June 2021). La famiglia Cibo e Cybo Malaspina / Tettoni L., Saladini F (in Italian).
- Pelù, Paolo; Raffo, Olga (2009). Il feudo di Ferentillo nel tempo di Alberico 1. Cybo Malaspina (1553-1623): istituzioni, economia, arte, confini: atti del Convegno di studi, Ferentillo, 30-31 maggio 2008 (in Italian). Aedes Muratoriana; Palazzo di S. Elisabetta. OCLC 930372681.
- Petrucci, Franca (1981). "CIBO MALASPINA, Alberico". Dizionario Biografico degli Italiani (in Italian). Vol. 25. Rome: Istituto dell'Enciclopedia Italiana.
