= Lorenzo Cybo =

Italian general

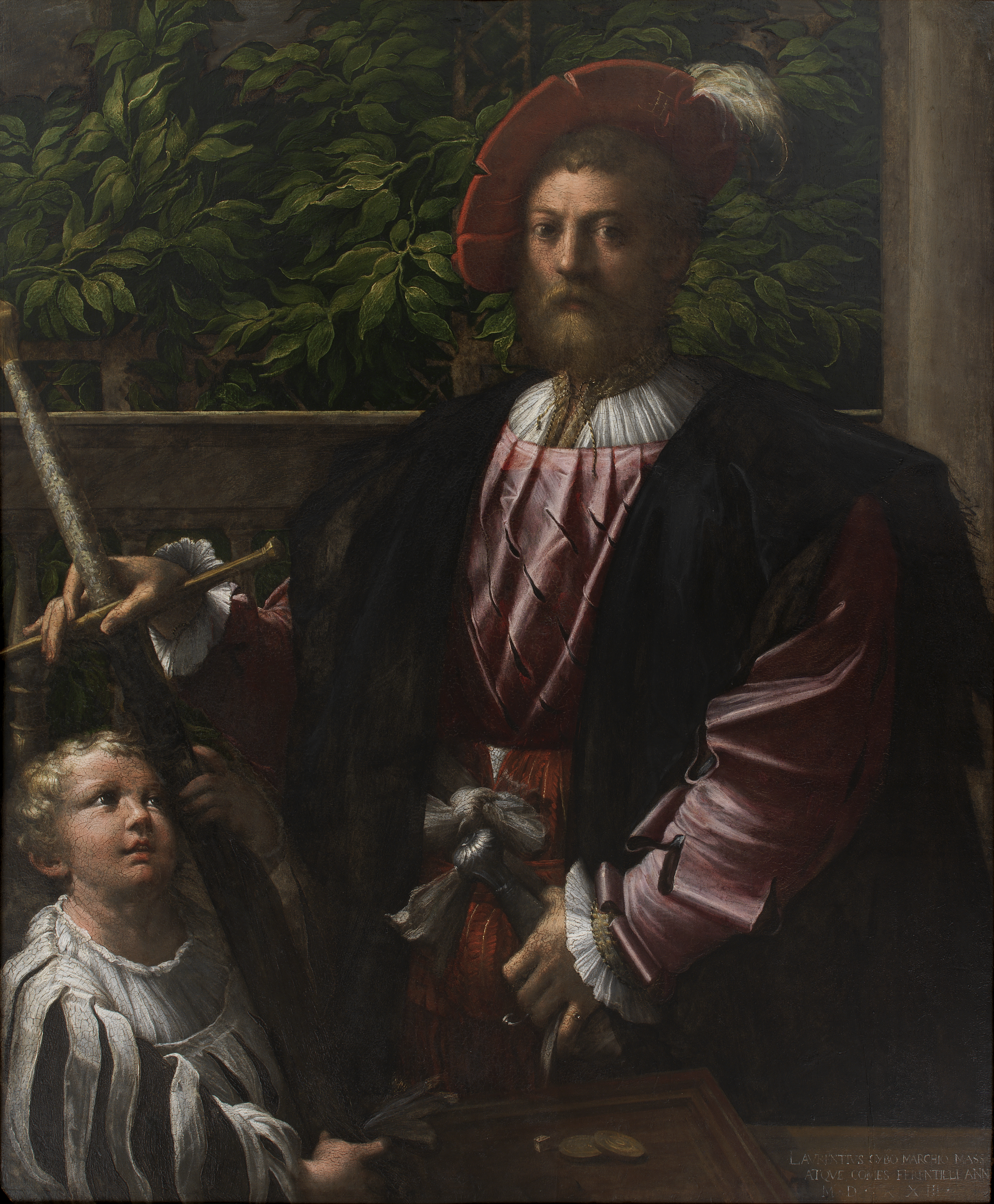
Portrait of Lorenzo Cybo by Parmigianino, 1524.

Lorenzo Cybo, also spelt Cibo, (20 July 1500 – 14 March 1549) was an Italian general, who was duke of Ferentillo, and co-owner marquis of Massa and lord of Carrara.

== Family ==
Born at Sampierdarena (in what is modern Genoa), he was the son of Franceschetto Cybo and Maddalena de' Medici, daughter of Lorenzo de' Medici. His paternal grandfather was Pope Innocent VIII. His uncle was Pope Leo X. His cousin was Pope Clement VII.

In 1520 Leo X, in agreement with Lorenzo's elder brother, Cardinal Innocenzo Cybo, arranged his marriage to Ricciarda Malaspina, the aspiring heiress of the Massa branch of the Malaspina family. From this marriage the new house of Cybo-Malaspina would originate: it was to hold the Marquisate (then Duchy) of Massa and Carrara until 1829, when it was annexed to the Duchy of Modena and Reggio, ruled by a successor of theirs in the female line.

Despite producing offspring, the marriage turned out to be decidedly stormy. Lorenzo aspired to take control of his late father-in-law's Marquisate in his own name or in the name of his first-born son who came into the world in 1525, but Ricciarda was determined to keep it in her hands. In 1529 she succeeded in having herself invested suo jure by the Emperor Charles V, but the following year Lorenzo in turn managed to have himself named co-owner ("co-padrone") of the fief. In 1538 he even made an attempt to force his wife out, but in vain, and in 1541 she finally obtained a new imperial decree revoking her husband's investiture for good.

Their first-born son Giulio, after having ousted Ricciarda by force from 1546 to 1547 with his father's help, ended up beheaded for treason in Milan in 1548.

Lorenzo Cybo died the following year, in 1549, and was succeeded as Duke of Ferentillo by his younger son Alberico, although perhaps born from his mother's adulterous relationship with Lorenzo's brother, Cardinal Innocenzo Cybo.

In 1553, upon his mother's death, Alberico succeeded her too, adding, by her testamentary disposition, the style Malaspina to his paternal surname.

== Military service ==
He held the position of commander-in-chief of the Papal Army.

== See also ==
- Portrait of Lorenzo Cybo

== Bibliography ==
- Calonaci, Stefano (2006). "MALASPINA, Ricciarda". Dizionario Biografico degli Italiani (in Italian). Vol. 67. Rome: Istituto dell'Enciclopedia Italiana.
- Petrucci, Franca (1981). "CIBO, Lorenzo". Dizionario Biografico degli Italiani (in Italian). Vol. 25. Rome: Istituto dell'Enciclopedia Italiana.
