= Giovanni Maria da Varano =

Italian statesman

Giovanni Maria da Varano (1481–1527) was an Italian statesman, and the duke of Camerino starting in 1515.

He was the son of Giulio Cesare da Varano. He was married in 1520 to Caterina Cybo (1501-1557), granddaughter of Lorenzo de Medici. Together, Caterina and Giovanni Maria, had only a daughter Giulia, who in 1535 married Guidobaldo II della Rovere. Giovanni died from the plague in 1527.

== Biography ==
He was the son of Giulio Cesare da Varano, who was killed in 1502 along with his sons by Cesare Borgia at the hands of the assassin Micheletto Corella. The Duke of Romagna had taken possession of Camerino after these killings. Before he was murdered, his father managed to save Giovanni Maria by sending him to Venice, together with his mother Giovanna Malatesta, his older Camilla Battista da Varano, and the family jewels. Upon the death of Pope Alexander VI in 1503, the Da Varano family regained possession of their fiefdoms and Giovanni Maria entered Camerino acclaimed as lord, with the consent of Pope Julius II.

Giovanni Maria's maternal grandparents were Sigismondo Pandolfo Malatesta, lord of Rimini, and Polissena Sforza.

On May 30, 1515, Giovanni Maria was solemnly crowned in the Temple of the Annunciation (built by Julius Caesar for the burials of the dynasty) as the first Duke of Camerino, after being invested by Pope Leo X. He had strengthened the Rocca di Borgia built by Valentino and enlarged the ducal palace. Here, together with his wife, he organized a princely court, increasing the prestige of the family. He also often stayed in the summer residence of the castle of Ajello and in the Varano fortress.

In 1520, Giovanni Maria married Caterina Cybo (1501-1557), daughter of Franceschetto Cybo (illegitimate son of Pope Innocent VIII) and Maddalena de' Medici (1473–1528) (daughter of Lorenzo de' Medici, sister of Pope Leo X, and cousin of Pope Clement VII). The couple had only one daughter, Giulia da Varano, who married Guidobaldo II della Rovere, Duke of Urbino, in 1534.The marriage was arranged by the Duchess Mother, acting as regent of Camerino following the death of her husband from the plague in 1527, and was linked to the possession of Camerino and Urbino: control of the duchy was disputed between Giulia, her cousin from the Ferrara branch of the family, Ercole da Varano, and her half-brother Rodolfo. Giulia died in 1547 at the age of twenty, while her lands had been ceded in 1539 to Ottavio Farnese, Duke of Parma, and were then incorporated into the Papal States. Giulia's only daughter and possible heir, Virginia della Rovere, attempted to regain the Duchy of Camerino through her marriage to Pope Pius IV's nephew, Prince Federico Borromeo (who used the title of Duke of Camerino), but to no avail.

== Sources ==
- Robin, Diana (2007). "Cibo, Caterina (Cybo; 1501-1577)". In Robin, Diana Maury; Larsen, Anne R.; Levin, Carole (eds.). Encyclopedia of Women in the Renaissance: Italy, France, and England. ABC-CLIO.
