= Maddalena de' Medici (1473–1528) =

Italian noble

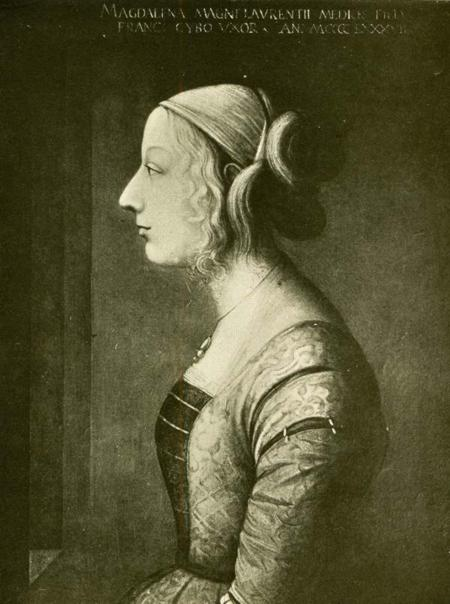
The favourite daughter of Clarice Orsini, she was “the eye of her heart”

Maddalena de' Medici (25 July 1473–2 December 1519) was a daughter of Lorenzo de' Medici and Clarice Orsini. Born in Florence, she and her siblings were educated to the humanistic cultures by figures such as Angelo Poliziano. In February 1487, she was engaged to be married to Franceschetto Cybo, son of Pope Innocent VIII. They were married in January 1488, and she brought a dowry of 4000 ducats. The marriage though an unhappy one, strengthened her family’s ties with the Vatican, helping her brother Giovanni get appointed as a cardinal. She used her influence with her father, her brother Piero, and the pope to help friends and poorer people get aid and positions within the Church and governments.

In 1488, she bought a thermal bath resort in Stigliano. She had the property renovated, turning it into a profitable resort.

Maddalena lived in Rome after the election of her brother Giovanni as Pope Leo X in 1513. Shortly after his election, Pope Leo made her son Innocenzo a Cardinal. Maddalena received Roman citizenship and a pension from her brother in 1515. She worked to arrange marriages between her children and members of noble families. She continued in her role of patron, negotiating with Pope Leo and her nephew Lorenzo to secure clients protection, funds, and release from imprisonment and exile. She died in Rome, and was buried in St. Peter's Basilica by order of her cousin, Pope Clement VII.

== Issue ==
Franceschetto and Maddalena had:

- Innocenzo Cybo (1491–1550), Cardinal
- Eleonora Cybo (1499–1557), Benedictine nun
- Lorenzo Cybo (1500–1549) Duke of Ferentillo, married Ricciarda Malaspina
- Caterina Cybo (1501–1557), married Giovanni Maria da Varano, Duke of Camerino
- Ippolita Cybo (1503–1562), married Roberto Ambrogio Sanseverino, Margrave of Colorno, Count of Caiazzo and Lord of Bobbio
- Giovanni Battista Cybo (1505–1550), bishop of Marseilles
