= Lordship of Carrara =

Medieval Italian feudal lordship

The Lordship of Carrara (Italian: Signoria di Carrara) was a feudal state in medieval Italy, centered in the town of Carrara in present-day northern Tuscany. It was historically associated with the lordships of Avenza and the Castle of Moneta, and included the surrounding areas of Marina di Carrara and the basin of the Carrione river.

In 1313, Emperor Henry VII suppressed the Bishopric of Luni, which had previously held authority over the region, and granted the territory of the former free commune of Carrara to his ally, the Republic of Pisa. Over the following century, control of Carrara passed through several ruling powers and noble families, including the city of Lucca and the Visconti of Milan.

In 1473, the territory was sold to the marquis of Massa, leading to a lasting union between the two lordships. From that point onward, Massa and Carrara were governed together in a personal union. Over time, both territories were elevated in status—first to a principality and a marquisate, and later to a duchy and a principality respectively—before their eventual merger into the Duchy of Modena and Reggio in 1836.

== See also ==
- Carrara
- Massa, Tuscany
- Duchy of Massa and Carrara
- History of Tuscany
