= Ricciarda Malaspina =

Italian noblewoman

Ricciarda Malaspina (3 or 6 March 1497 – 13 or 16 June 1553) was an Italian noblewoman, who was marquise of Massa and lady of Carrara from 1519 to 1546, and again from May 1547 until her death in 1553. She was ultimately succeeded by her younger son Alberico I Cybo-Malaspina.

== Biography ==
=== Family and first marriage ===
Born in Massa, she was the daughter of Antonio Alberico II Malaspina and Lucrezia d'Este. Her father in 1481 had become marquis of Massa and lord of Carrara, in condominium with his brother Francesco, whom however he soon ousted from power. Having no sons, Antonio Alberico, in violation of Salic law, named his first daughter, Eleonora, as heiress to his titles. Elenora was married to Scipione Fieschi, count of Lavagna, but she died in 1515. The following year Fieschi got married again, this time to his sister-in-law, Ricciarda. The marriage lasted for four years, until he too died, without male issue.

In his renewed will Antonio Alberico established as his universal heir the future first-born son of Ricciarda, or, in the event of his predecease, Ricciarda's other sons in order of birth, or, in their absence, those of his fourth-born daughter Taddea, or in further absence and always respecting the order of birth, the male children of the daughters of the two princesses. Finally, should these leave no male issue either, the succession would pass to Antonio Alberico's grandnephews, Francesco and Ottaviano Malaspina, descendants of his brother Francesco. The Salic law in force in the territories of the Empire seemed thus in some way safeguarded, and Ricciarda was in the meantime named "lady and mistress and usufructuary and heiress of his [Antonio Alberico's] inheritance and assets, as long as she is of age to conceive and bear children".

=== Second marriage and power struggle with her husband ===
After Antonio Alberico also died in 1519 (few months before her husband), notwithstanding her being a woman and in spite of the Salic law, Ricciarda succeeded in maintaining control over his states. The following year she married Lorenzo Cybo, a Genoese nobleman who was a grandson of Pope Innocent VIII and Lorenzo de' Medici, and a nephew of the incumbent Pope Leo X.

In a period in which Italy was overrun by the wars between France, Spain, the Holy Roman Empire, and the Italian states, she proved adroit in wangling her way amid conflicting interests and, despite being a relative of Pope Clement VII by marriage and often living in Rome, she managed to win the Emperor Charles V's favour. Thus, in 1529, also to counter her husband's ambitions to get his hands on her father's fiefdoms, she succeeded in getting invested with them suo jure with a truly unusual imperial decree: in derogation of the Salic law, it gave her the right to transmit her titles not only to her male descendants, but, in their absence, also to females, always respecting the newly established principle of primogeniture.

The following year her husband went on the counterattack and in turn managed to get himself appointed "co-owner" of the two fiefdoms by Charles V, but the two spouses could no longer find terms of mutual understanding and peaceful coexistence. After a failed attempt by Lorenzo to oust her from the throne by force in 1538, Ricciarda turned again to the emperor: in 1541 she succeeded in having the 1530 imperial decree revoked and thus got rid of her husband's claims for good.

The two spouses had already been living apart for over a decade.

=== Conflict with her son Giulio, death and legacy ===
When the couple's eldest son Giulio came of age, it was he that extorted the lordship from Ricciarda in 1546, by force of arms, threats and entreaties and, finally, with a purchase contract whose terms were far beyond his means, but she took back the reins on 27 June 1547 when he proved unable to fully honour the debt arising from the contract. He was soon implicated in a pro-France conspiracy, was arrested in Pontremoli on 22 January 1548, and was beheaded for treason in Milan on 18 May, by imperial decision. Ricciarda made attempts to save her son from death, although it is difficult to establish whether she really did her utmost. In a letter written from Rome on 2 February 1548, in particular, she directly entreated pardon of Charles V, but in vain.

The beheading of her son was soon followed by the death of her husband, on 14 March 1549. Writing to her sister Taddea, Ricciarda expressed herself with words that are, according to Calonaci, 'emblematic of her character':

"My dear sister, you ought to have learned about Sir Lorenzo's death from other letters of mine. Know that, had anybody told me I would be saddened by it, I'd have spat in their face. Yet, let me assure you that it grieved me."

Ricciarda Malaspina continued to reign over Massa until her death in 1553. She was succeeded by her younger son Alberico, officially held to be legitimate but most probably the son of Cardinal Innocenzo Cybo, Ricciarda's brother-in-law and her long-time lover en titre and mentor. In her will she imposed on her successors the obligatory clause that they should bear her family surname Malaspina alongside their paternal one Cybo, thus giving rise to the new House of Cybo-Malaspina, who would hold Massa and Carrara until 1790 (or 1829 if the Este daughter of the last Cybo-Malaspina duchess is also taken into account).

== Children ==
From her first marriage Ricciarda had only one daughter, Isabella Fieschi (1519–1597).

From her second marriage Ricciarda had three children who survived to adulthood:

1. Eleonora Cybo (1523–1594);
2. Giulio I Cybo, Marquis of Massa (1525–1548) dethroned his mother in 1546–1547 and was later beheaded in 1548 by decision of Emperor Charles V;
3. Alberico I Cybo-Malaspina, Prince of Massa (1534–1623) succeeded his mother following her death. albeit in reality the likely illegitimate son of his uncle, the cardinal.

Ricciarda also had several illegitimate children:

- Alessandro, Clemente, Elena and Ricciarda, later legitimized by her brother-in-law Cardinal Innocenzo Cybo, their father;
- Scipione, by her lover, the imperial ambassador to Rome, Giovan Ferdinando Manrique d'Aguilar;
- Giulia Cybo (ca. 1535–1591), of uncertain paternity (possibly another member of the Cybo family).

== Bibliography ==
- Calonaci, Stefano (2006). "Malaspina, Ricciarda". In Dizionario Biografico degli Italiani, volume 67, Enciclopedia Italiana

Preceded by Antonio Alberico Malaspina	Marquise of Massa; Lady of Carrara; 1519–1546	Succeeded by Giulio I
Preceded by Giulio I	Marquise of Massa; Lady of Carrara; 1547–1553	Succeeded by Alberico I

uf
