= Agnano, San Giuliano Terme =

Agnano
- Frazione
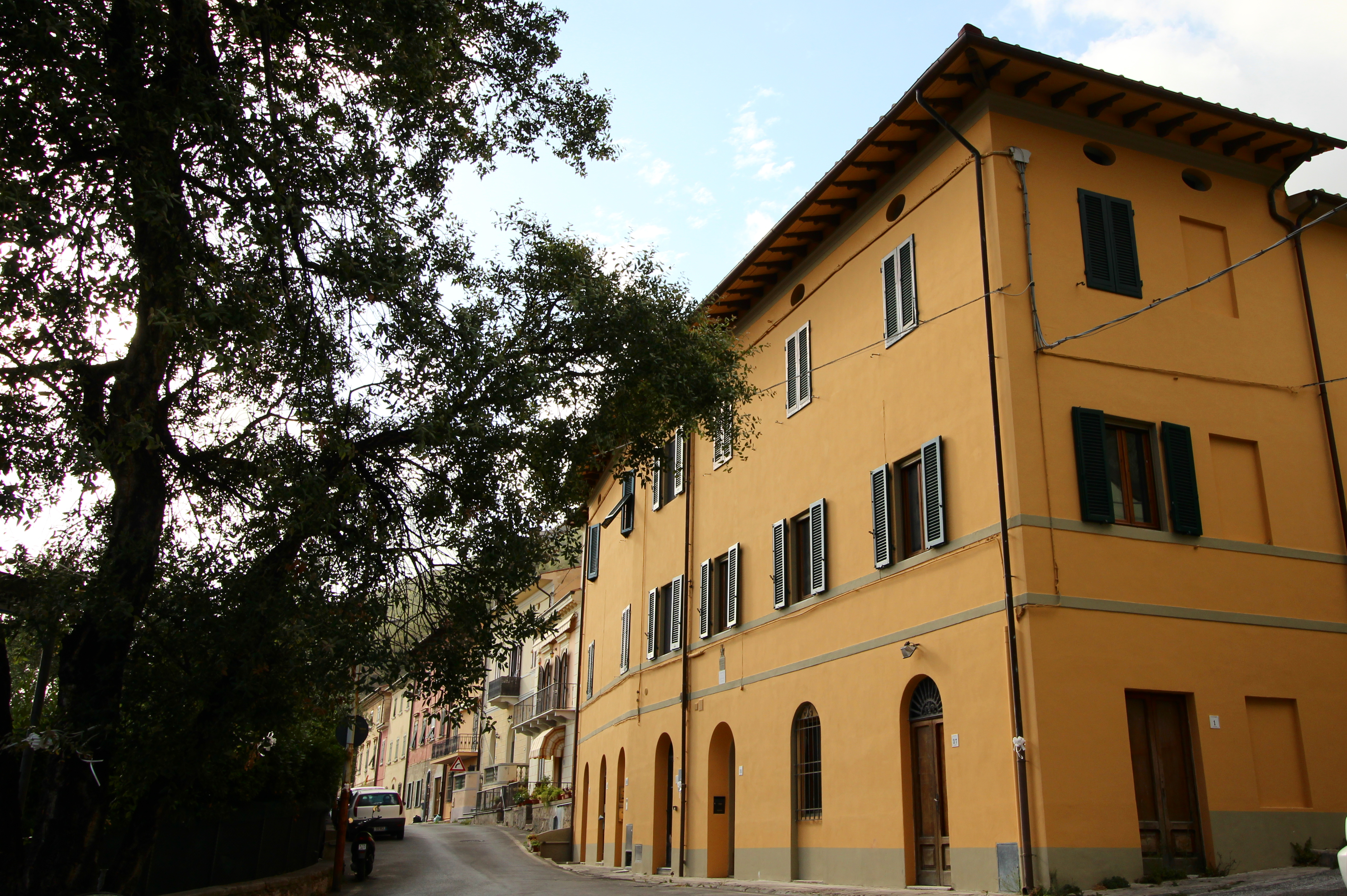

- Location of Agnano in Italy
- Coordinates: 43°44′13″N 10°29′14″E
- Country: Italy
- Region: Tuscany
- Province: Pisa (PI)
- Comune: San Giuliano Terme
- Elevation: 93 m (305 ft)

Population (2011)
  - Total: 479
- Time zone: UTC+1 (CET)
  - Summer (DST): UTC+2 (CEST)
- Postal code: 56017
- Dialing code: (+39) 050

Agnano is a village in Tuscany, central Italy, administratively a frazione of the comune of San Giuliano Terme, province of Pisa. At the time of the 2001 census its population was 518.

Agnano is about 10 km (6.2 mi) from Pisa and 6 km (3.7 mi) from San Giuliano Terme.
