= Franceschetto Cybo =

Italian nobleman

- Coat of Arms for the House of Cybo
- Born: c. 1450
- Died: 25 July 1519 (aged 68–69)
- Spouse: Maddalena de' Medici
- Children: Lucrezia Cybo; Clarice Cybo; Innocenzo Cybo; Eleonora Cybo; Lorenzo Cybo; Caterina Cybo; Ippolita Cybo; Giovanni Battista Cybo; Innocenza (ill.)
- Father: Pope Innocent VIII
- Relatives: Pope Leo X (brother-in-law); Lorenzo de' Medici (father-in-law)

Franceschetto Cybo (baptized Francesco) (c. 1450 – 25 July 1519) was an Italian nobleman, noteworthy for being the illegitimate son of Pope Innocent VIII (Giovanni Battista Cybo). Later naturalized by his father into becoming his legitimate heir, Franceschetto was infamous for his gambling addiction and wanton spending of the Papal treasury for various pleasures and scandals. He is otherwise noteworthy for his political marriage to Maddalena de Medici, and their offspring formed a dynastic lineage that persists in the nobility of Europe until today.

== Early life ==
Franceschetto was born in Naples in 1450, to an unknown Neapolitan woman and Giovanni Battista Cybo. His father would later be elected Pope and take the name Innocent VIII. Although born with the name Francesco, he was nicknamed "Franceschetto" due to his small stature.

Upon his father's ascension to the Papacy as Pope Innocent VIII, Franceschetto infamously engaged in rampant gambling and womanizing throughout Rome. After failed attempts at marriage with one of the bastard daughters of the King of Naples, Franceschetto was eventually married to Lorenzo de' Medici's daughter, Maddalena de' Medici. This was part of a deal between Pope Innocent VIII and Lorenzo, where the Pope would make Giovanni de Medici, Lorenzo's son, into a cardinal in exchange for this marriage to Maddalena. Through this marriage and deal, therefore, Franceschetto was brother-in-law to Pope Leo X (Giovanni de' Medici).

== Noble career ==
Despite his infamy and the numerous scandals surrounding him, Franceschetto received from his father important positions in the Papal States: governor and Captain General of Rome (1488), the fiefs of Cerveteri and Anguillara (1490) and the title of Count of the Lateran Palace, among others.

In September 1490, amidst false rumors of the death of Innocent VIII, Franceschetto attempted to seize the Papal treasury and also kidnapped son of Sultan Mehmed II, Cem, in an attempt to extract ransom money. This failed when the Pope turned out to be alive, but a significant portion of the treasury remained missing even afterwards.

Two years later, after Innocent VIII's death, Franceschetto was forced into hiding with the election of Pope Alexander VI, who looked poorly upon Franceschetto's Medici and Orsini allies. Franceschetto was forced to sell many of his father's possessions, including the title of count of Anguillara, while moving between various cities in Italy. He eventually could return to Rome thanks to the election of the more favourable Pope Julius II (1503), who gave him the title of Duke of Spoleto.

Franceschetto's lot continued to improve with the election of his brother-in-law Giovanni de Medici to the papacy as Pope Leo X, who also gave him several titles, and eventually made Franceschetto's son Innocenzo into a cardinal.

== Death ==
He died in 1519 after a trip to Tunis. He is buried in Innocent VIII's sepulchre in St. Peter's Basilica.

== Issue ==
Franceschetto and Maddalenna had eight children:

- Lucrezia Cybo (1489–1492)
- Clarice Cybo (1490–1492), born deformed
- Innocenzo Cybo (1491–1550), Archbishop of Genoa and cardinal
- Eleonora Cybo (1499–1557), a Benedictine nun.
- Lorenzo Cybo (1500–1549), founder of the Cybo Malaspina line
- Caterina Cybo (1501–1557), Duchess of Camerino
- Ippolita Cybo (1503–1562), married Roberto di Sanserverino, Count of Caiazzo
- Giovanni Battista Cybo (1505–1550), Bishop of Marseille

He had also an illegitimate daughter:

- Innocenza (died before 1530). She married Antonio d'Ibletto.

== Sources ==
- Williams, George L. (1998). Papal Genealogy: The Families and Descendants of the Popes. McFarland & Company, Inc.
