= Innocenzo Cybo =

Italian Catholic cardinal and archbishop

His Eminence Innocenzo Cybo
- Archbishop of Genoa
- Church: Roman Catholic Church
- Archdiocese: Genoa
- Appointed: 11 May 1520
- Term ended: 14 April 1550
- Predecessor: Giovanni Maria Sforza
- Successor: Gerolamo Sauli
- Other post: Cardinal-Deacon of Santa Maria in Via Lata
- Previous posts: Cardinal-Deacon of Santi Cosma e Damiano (1513–1517); Cardinal-Deacon of Santa Maria in Domnica (1517–1550)

Orders
- Created cardinal: 23 September 1513 by Pope Leo X
- Rank: Cardinal-Deacon

Personal details
- Born: 25 August 1491 Genoa, Republic of Genoa
- Died: 14 April 1550 (aged 58) Rome, Papal States
- Buried: Santa Maria Sopra Minerva
- Parents: Franceschetto Cybo and Maddalena di Lorenzo de' Medici
- Children: 4

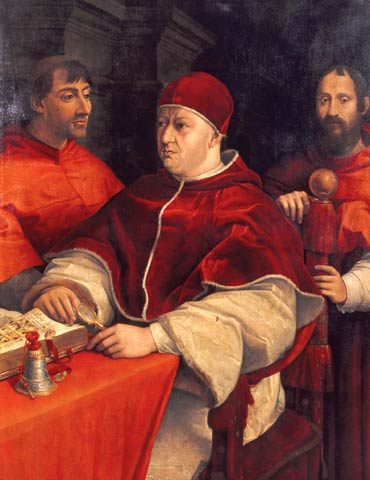
Innocenzo Cybo (right), together with Giulio de' Medici (left), and Pope Leo X (center).

Innocenzo Cybo (25 August 1491 – 13 April 1550) was an Italian cardinal and archbishop.

== Family and education ==
From the Genoese family Cibo, in 1488 the Cybo family purchased Florentine citizenship for a considerable sum of money Innocenzo was born in Florence on 25 August 1491 to Franceschetto Cybo and Maddalena di Lorenzo de' Medici. His father was the illegitimate son of Giovanni Battista Cibo, who became Pope Innocent VIII (1484–1492), and had five additional children: Lorenzo, Caterina, Ippolita, Giovanni Battista and Pietro. Francesco's sister, Theodorina, married Gerardo Usumari, a rich Genoese. Innocenzo's mother was the daughter of Lorenzo the Magnificent and sister of Piero de' Medici, Giovanni de' Medici, who became Pope Leo X (1513–1520), Giulio de' Medici, and three other sisters. Her first cousin, Giulio de' Medici, became Pope Clement VII (1523–1534).

He was presumably educated at the Medici court. When his uncle Giovanni de' Medici was elected pope in March 1513, benefits flowed even more abundantly to the Cybo.

== Cardinal and archbishop ==
On 17 March 1513, the day on which Leo X was consecrated a bishop, he made Innocenzo a Protonotary Apostolic In Pope Leo's first consistory, 23 September 1513, he was made cardinal deacon of SS. Cosma e Damiano. He exchanged this deaconry for Santa Maria in Domnica on 26 June 1517. On 11 May 1520, he was made archbishop of Genoa by the favour of his uncle Pope Leo X. For a brief three months in 1521 he was Cardinal Camerlengo of the Holy Roman Church but was 'allowed' to sell the office for the sum of 35,000 ducats to another of Leo's favourites, Cardinal Francesco Armellino de' Medici

He accumulated the rights of administration over episcopal sees, e.g. St Andrews (13 October 1513—13 November 1514), Marseille, Aleria in Corsica (19 June 1518 – 19 December 1520), Ventimiglia (27 July 1519 – 8 August 1519) and numerous others, most for brief periods of time.

He participated in the 1521–1522 papal conclave, and, even though (or perhaps because) he was ill and had to cast his vote from his sickbed, he came close to being elected pope. Once his name was suggested he managed about twenty votes, apparently from the younger cardinals, those desirous of continuing the habits of the court of Leo X.

King Francis I of France appointed him Abbot of Saint-Victor of Lerins in 1522, hoping, no doubt, to strengthen the French interest in the College of Cardinals after the election of the minister of Emperor Charles V to the papal throne as Adrian VI. He was also granted the Abbey of St Ouen in Rouen.

In 1524 he was made Legate of Bologna and the Romagna. In 1529 and 1530, he was the host of both Emperor Charles V and Pope Clement VII in Bologna, and he participated in the coronation of the Emperor on 24 February as Archdeacon. At the conclusion of the ceremonies, he and Cardinal Ippolito de' Medici accompanied the Emperor on his homeward journey as far as Mantua.

Just before the Sack of Rome of 1527, he took refuge in Massa Carrara, host of his sister-in-law and mistress Ricciarda Malaspina, by whom he had four children, who were later naturalized.

A report to the Venetian Senate, written by Antonio Sorano, its ambassador at Rome, on 18 July 1531, provides an analysis of Cardinal Cibo, as his assignment required. He stated that Cibo was not a person of grand affairs nor of deep thought, but too immediately given over to worldly pleasures and to some lasciviousness. Pope Clement did not seek his counsel on matters of state.

In 1532 and 1533 Cardinal Cybo was sent by his first cousin once removed, Clement VII, to govern Florence during the absence of Duke Alessandro de' Medici. He was one of the four Cardinals appointed executors of Pope Clement's Will At the conclave following Clement's death, he had hopes of the papacy, but was eclipsed by Paul III, and subsequently he decided to return to Florence. But here his relationships with the Grand Duke Cosimo I de' Medici deteriorated, and he moved again to Massa Carrara in 1540. Two years later his loyalty to the Imperial cause was rewarded with the title of Cardinal Protector of Germany.

In Rome, the Cardinal had his residence in Palazzo Altemps. He returned to that city in 1549 to take part in the Conclave following the death of Pope Paul III (Farnese). The favoured candidate was Reginald Pole, but Giovanni Maria Ciocchi del Monte, Julius III, was elected. As senior Cardinal Deacon Innocenzo Cibo crowned Pope Julius III on 22 February 1550. On 28 February 1550, he exchanged the Deaconry of Santa Maria in Domnica for that of Santa Maria in Via Lata. He died on 13 April 1550, according to his tombstone, at the age of 59 and having been a cardinal for 37 years. He was buried in the Basilica of Santa Maria sopra Minerva, in the centre of the Choir, behind the High Altar, between the monuments of his uncle Leo X and his cousin Clement VII.

== Notes ==
Catholic Church titles
Preceded by Alessandro Farnese	Cardinal-Deacon of Santi Cosma e Damiano; 1513–1517	Succeeded by Giovanni Salviati
Preceded by Alexander Stewart	Administrator of the Diocese of St Andrews; Opposed by John Hepburn; 1513–1514	Succeeded by Andrew Forman
Preceded by Giovanni Francesco della Rovere	Administrator of Turin (1st time); 1516–1517	Succeeded by Claudio di Seyssel
Preceded by Claudio di Seyssel	Administrator of Marseille; 1517–1530	Succeeded by Giovanni Battista Cibo (bishop)
Preceded by Giulio de' Medici	Cardinal-Deacon of Santa Maria in Domnica; 1517–1550	Succeeded by Niccolò Gaddi
Preceded by Girolamo Pallavicini	Administrator of Aleria; 1518–1520	Succeeded by Francesco Pallavicini
Preceded by Marco Vigerio della Rovere	Administrator of Ventimiglia; 1519	Succeeded by Jean Baptiste de Mari
Preceded by Giovanni Maria Sforza	Archbishop of Genoa; 1520–1550	Succeeded by Girolamo Sauli
Preceded by Claudio di Seyssel	Archbishop of Turin (2nd time); 1520–1548	Succeeded by Cesare Cibo
Preceded by Vincenzo Sabbatini	Administrator of Vulturara e Montecorvino; 1526	Succeeded by Giulio Mastrogiudice
Preceded by Ottaviano Fornari	Administrator of Mariana; 1531	Succeeded by Octaviano Cibo
Preceded by Antoine Dubois (bishop)	Administrator of Béziers; 1536–1550	Succeeded by Jean de Lettes
Preceded by Giovanni Antonio Pappacoda	Administrator of Tropea; 1538	Succeeded by Girolamo Ghinucci
Preceded by Antonio La Legname	Administrator of Messina; 1538–1550	Succeeded by Giovanni Andrea Mercurio
Preceded by Niccolò Ridolfi	Cardinal-Deacon of Santa Maria in Via Lata; 1550	Succeeded by Niccolò Gaddi
