= Guy of Spoleto =

Guy of Spoleto may refer to:

- Guy I of Spoleto (d. 860)
- Guy II of Spoleto (d. 882/83)
- Guy III of Spoleto (d. 894), also King of Italy and Holy Roman Emperor
- Guy IV of Spoleto (d. 897)
