= Medieval European sculpture =

Artistic manifestation of the Middle Ages in Europe

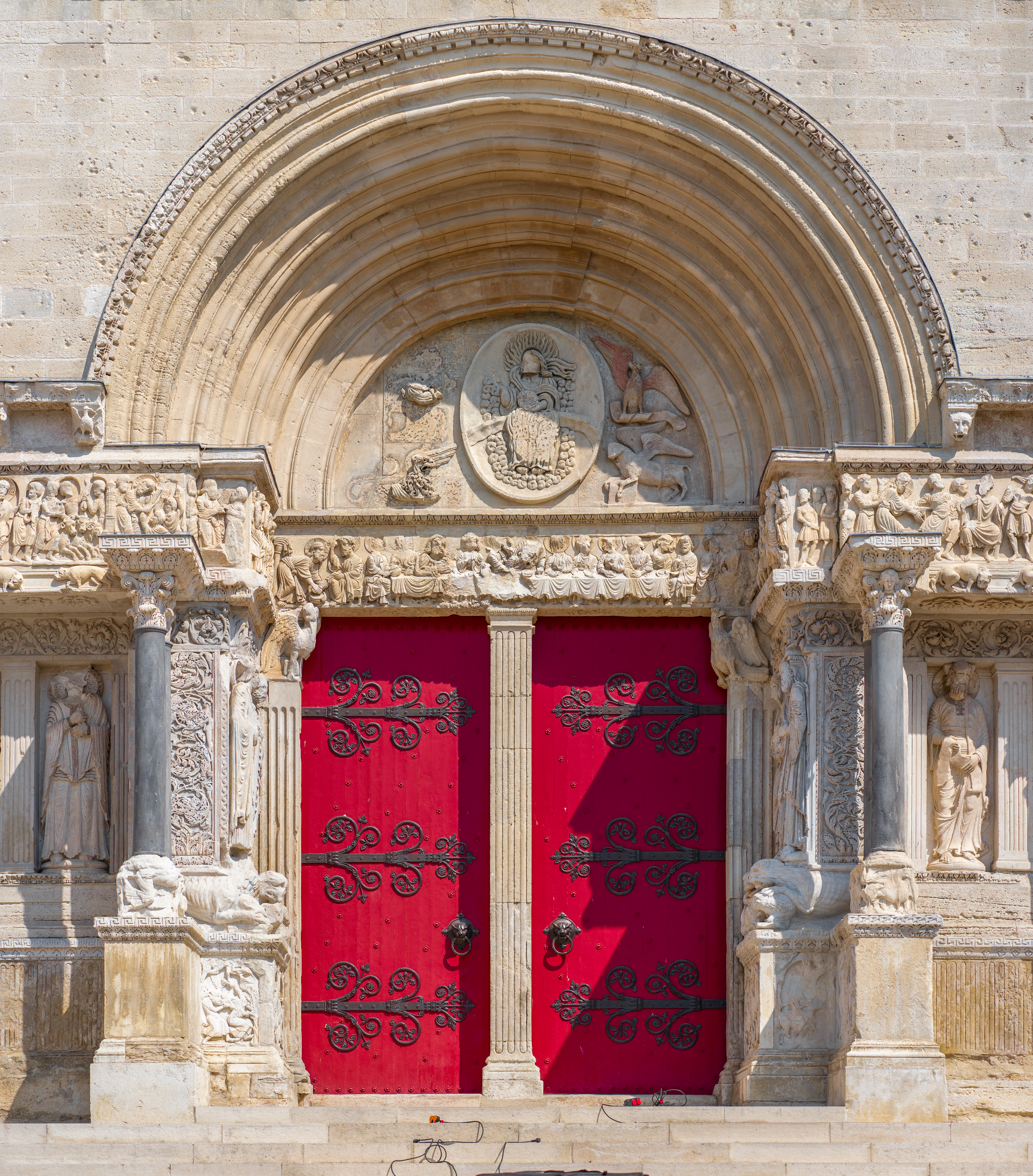
Central portal of Saint-Gilles-du-Gard Abbey in southern Françe. Sculpted during the XIIth century

Medieval European sculpture encompasses a broad chronological span extending from the disintegration of classical monumentality in Late Antiquity to the flourishing of proto-Renaissance languages in the fifteenth century. During the Early Middle Ages, following the collapse of the figurative traditions of the Roman Empire in the fifth century, large-scale sculptural production underwent a marked contraction in public space, becoming largely confined to the so-called minor or luxury arts, such as ivory carving, goldsmithing, and manuscript illumination. It was not until the late tenth and early eleventh centuries that a revival of monumental stone sculpture occurred, closely linked to the architectural renewal of the Romanesque in regions such as Burgundy and Languedoc. This process of «monumentalization» entailed a transition from flat relief and absolute subordination to the architectural framework —the celebrated «law of the frame» (a term coined by Henri Focillon)— toward a progressive autonomy of the figure that would culminate in Gothic naturalism, where the column-statue and sculpture in the round recovered a physical presence and gestural mobility not seen since Classical Antiquity.

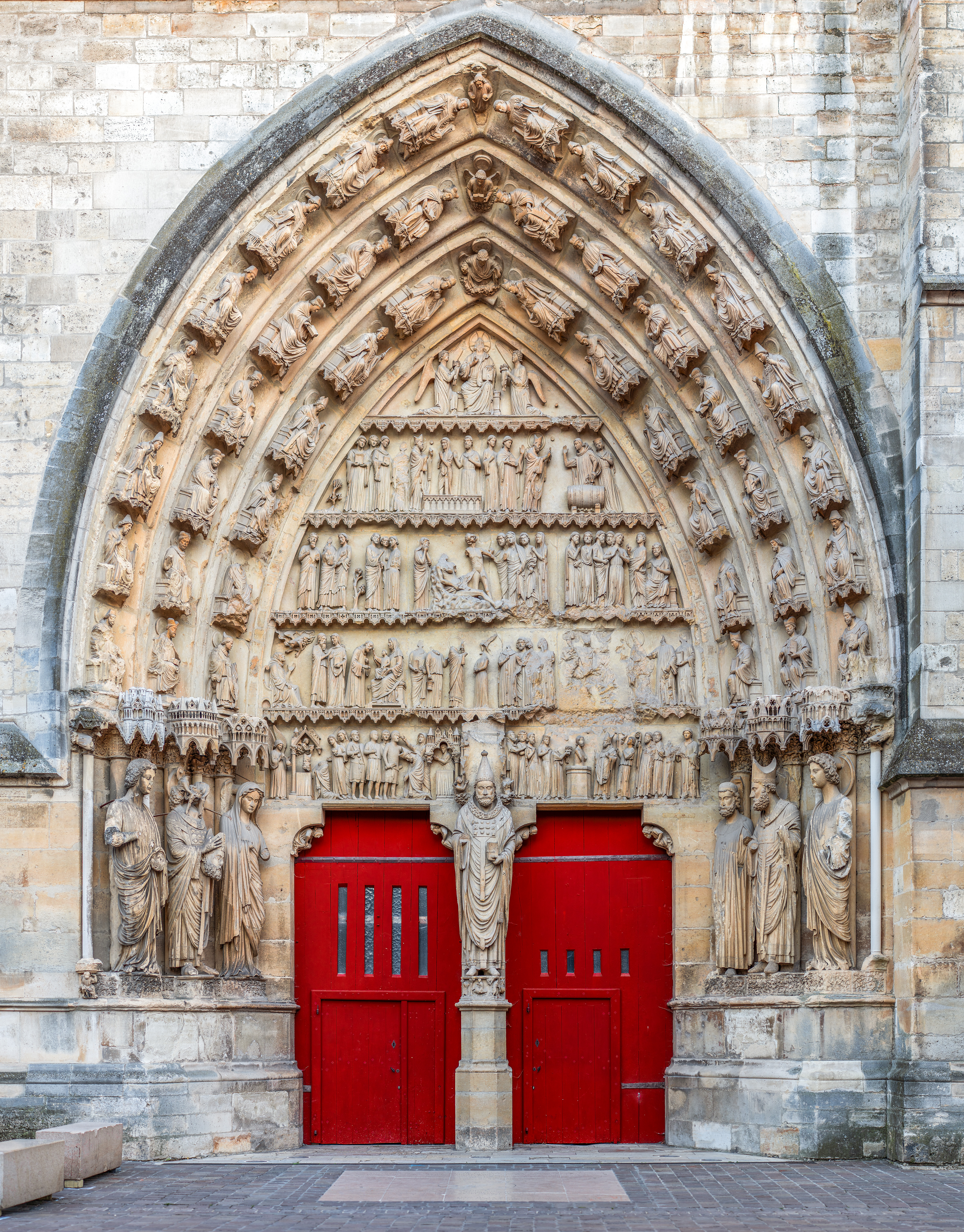
Reims, Notre-Dame Cathedral, north transept. Portal of Saint-Calixte, circa 1225–1230

The thematic program and social function of sculpture in the Middle Ages were defined by a profound liturgical, didactic, and symbolic vocation, operating as a veritable «Bible for the illiterate» that translated theological dogma into an accessible visual narrative. Church portals and capitals were populated with apocalyptic visions, with Christ in Majesty and the Last Judgment as central axes, accompanied by the dialectical representation of the psychomachy, or struggle between virtues and vices. Alongside these sacred themes, medieval imagination developed a vast repertoire of monstrous beings, hybrids, and chimeras which, although criticized by figures such as Bernard of Clairvaux for their distracting character, fulfilled functions of moral admonition and the purification of the imagination. With the advent of the Gothic, subject matter became more humanized, privileging Marian devotion through forms such as the Vierge ouvrante and the exaltation of secular power through the funerary effigies of sovereigns and nobles, who sought in the idealized portrait a guarantee of perpetual presence and memory.

In terms of materiality and technique, medieval sculpture reveals a complex relationship of appropriation and transcendence of the ancient past, frequently employing spolia or reused marbles from Roman ruins to endow new works with ancestral prestige. While stone —limestone, marble, and granite— was the predominant material in the architectural sphere, polychromed wood became the preferred medium for interior devotional imagery, such as large monumental crucifixes, whereas precious metals and bronze cast using the lost-wax technique defined the technical excellence of workshops in regions such as the Meuse and the Rhine. Goldsmithing, with masters such as Nicholas of Verdun, reached a level of technical sophistication that often preceded and informed stylistic innovations in large-scale stone sculpture. It is essential to note that the present appearance of many of these works is misleading, as originally the vast majority of medieval sculptures, both in stone and wood, were covered with rich polychromy and gilding intended to confer a «real presence» and a chromatic vitality that has since been lost.

== Late Antique and Early Medieval Sculpture (3th - 5th centuries A.D.) ==
Between the third and sixth centuries, the transformations observed in sculpture cannot be understood without reference to a broader context of profound political, social, and religious change. The Late Roman Empire was marked by recurrent crises —military instability, economic contraction, and administrative reorganisation— which altered systems of patronage and artistic production. Investment in traditional workshops declined, and with it the transmission of classical naturalistic techniques, while new priorities emerged that favoured clarity, symbolism, and communicative effectiveness over illusionistic representation. At the same time, urban life itself was undergoing significant change: the long-standing “statue habit”, whereby cities were filled with honorific and civic sculptures, gradually diminished from the late third century onwards, reflecting a shift in social practices and the reduced role of public monumental display. Sculpture, rather than disappearing, was reoriented towards new contexts—particularly architectural decoration and smaller-scale or relief formats.

Equally decisive was the transformation of the religious landscape. The progressive rise of Christianity —from its legalisation under Constantine in the early fourth century to its establishment as state religion under Theodosius I— redefined the meaning and function of images. Traditional pagan statuary, often associated with cult practices, came to be viewed with suspicion or rejected, while new forms of visual expression developed to convey theological ideas and spiritual values. This shift encouraged a move away from the representation of physical likeness towards more abstract, symbolic, and hieratic forms, capable of expressing moral qualities or transcendent truths rather than material reality. In this context, the stylistic evolution from Late Roman to Early Byzantine sculpture appears less as a decline than as a reconfiguration of artistic aims, shaped by a world in which political authority, religious belief, and cultural identity were being fundamentally redefined.

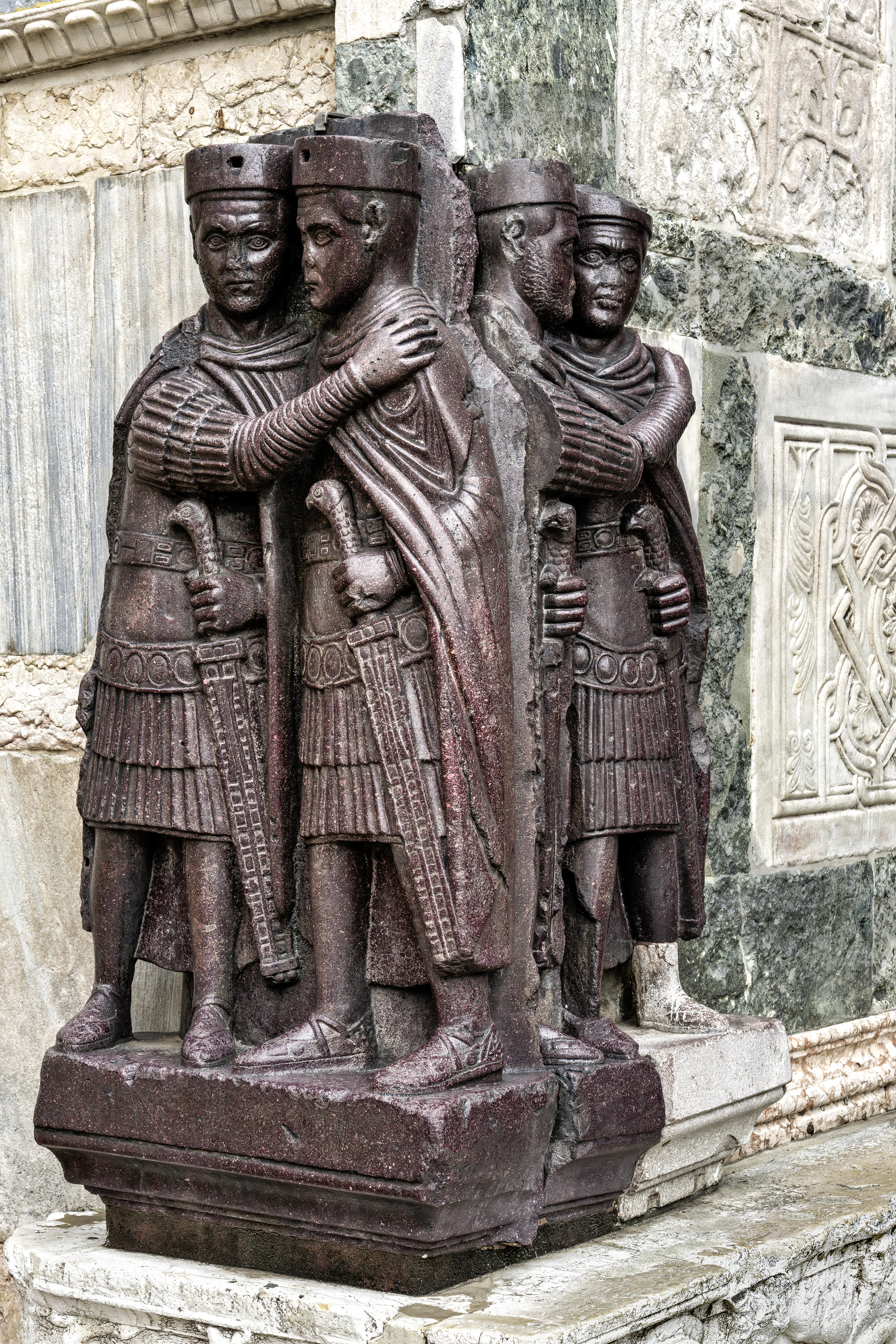
Portrait of the Four Tetrarchs, c. 305 A.D., Venice, St. Mark's Basilica

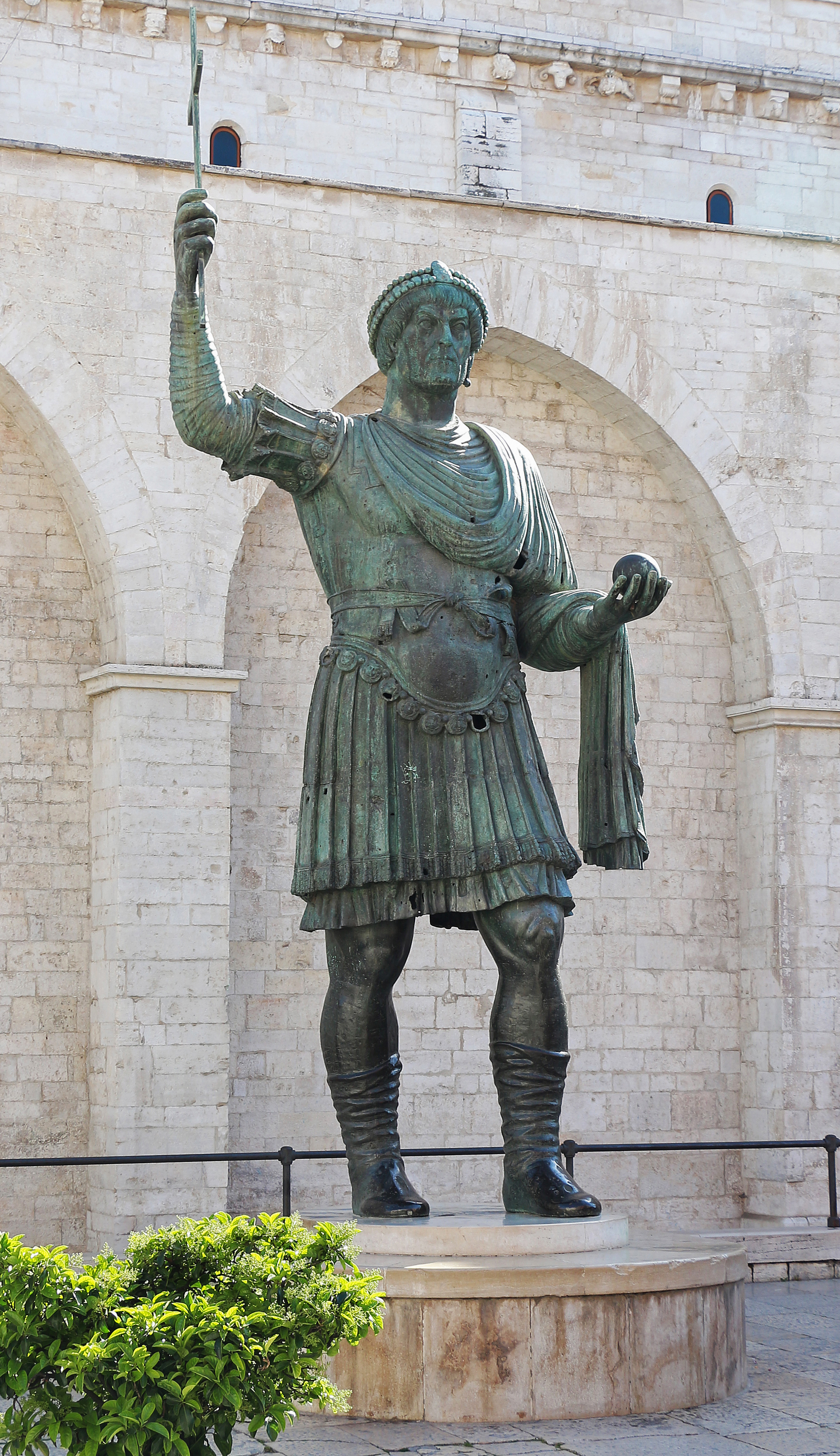
Colossus of Barletta, 5th or early 6th centuries. Barletta, Italy

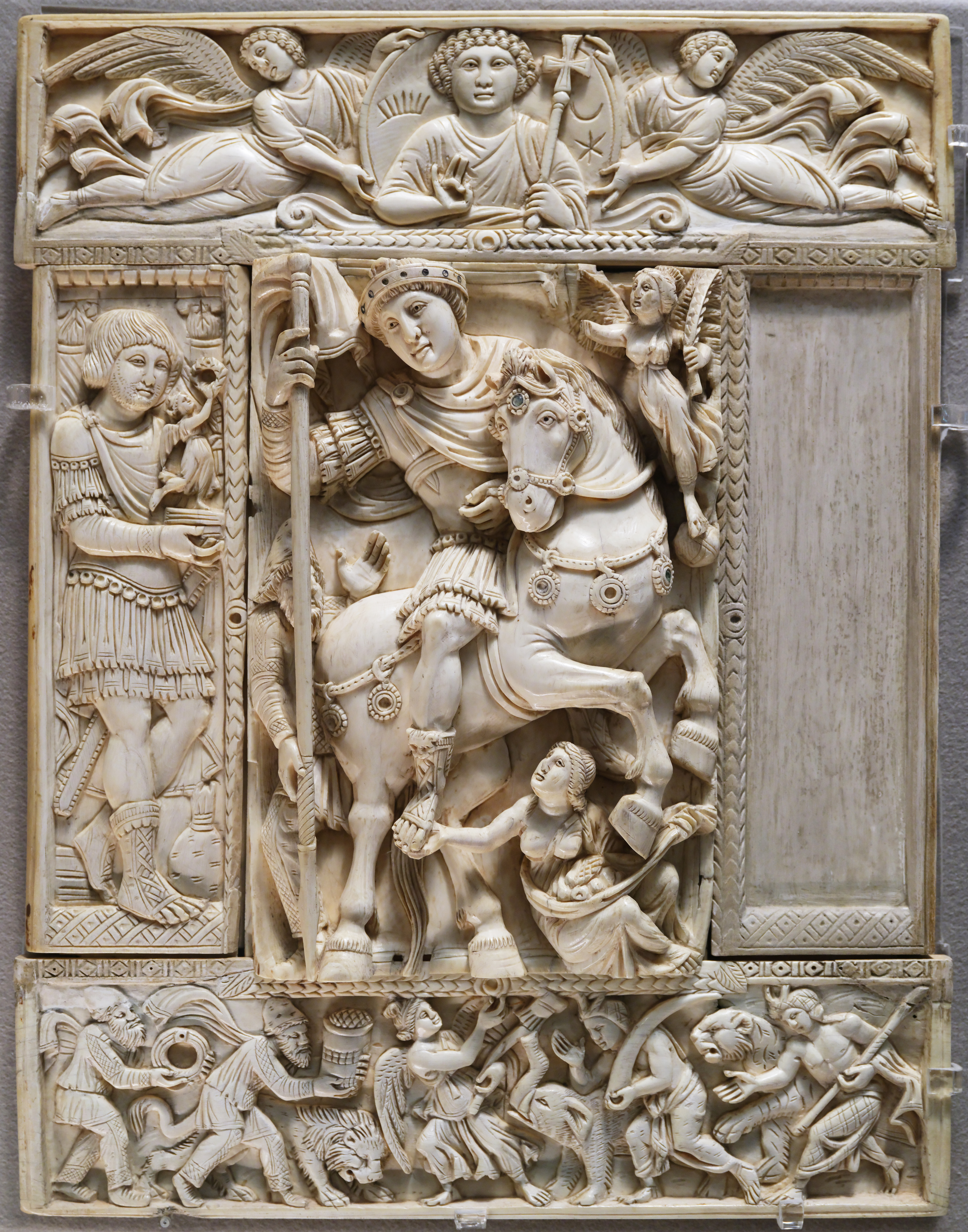
Barberini ivory, mid-6th century A.D., Musée du Louvre, Paris

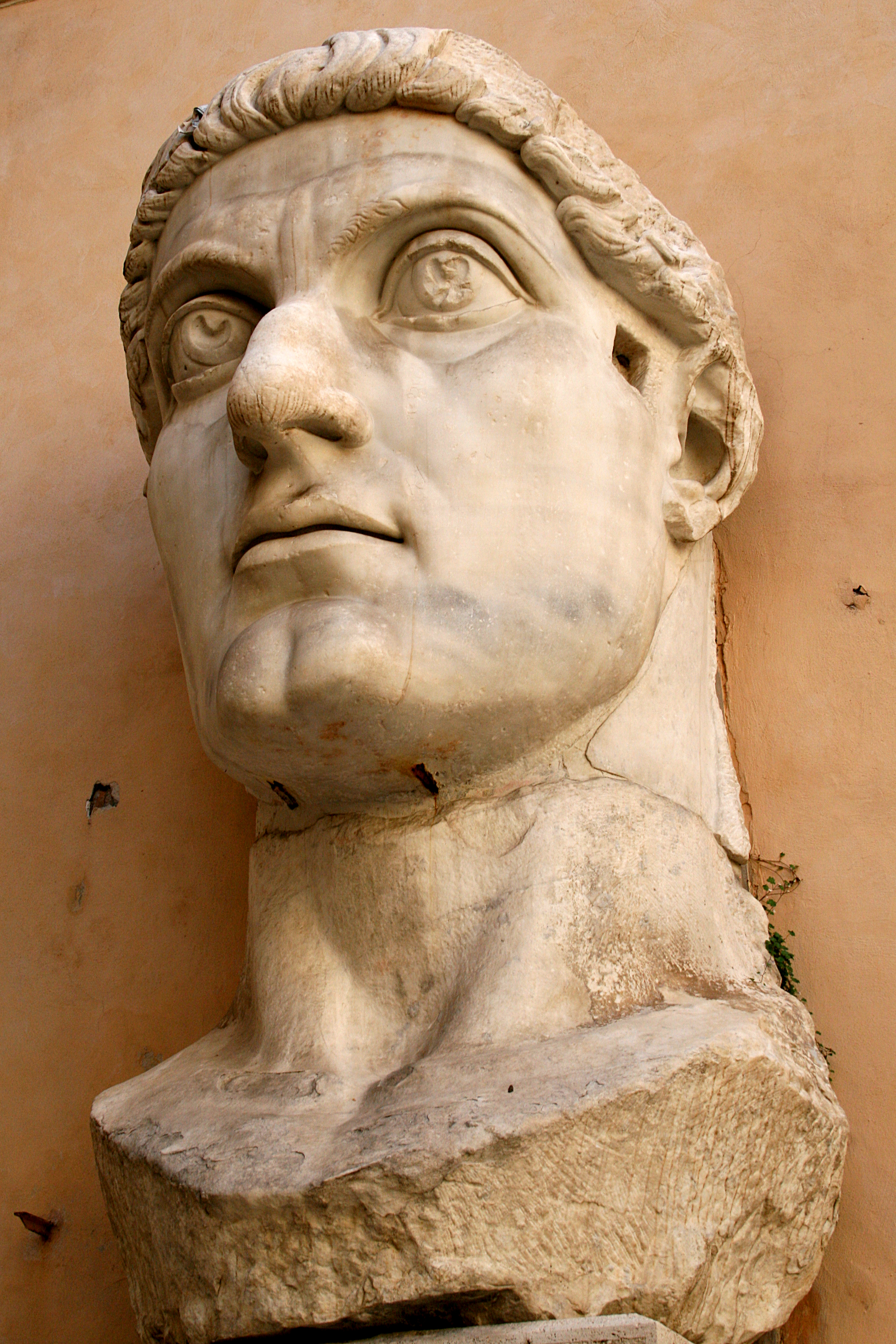
Colossus of Constantine, ca. 312–315 A.D., Capitoline Museums, Rome

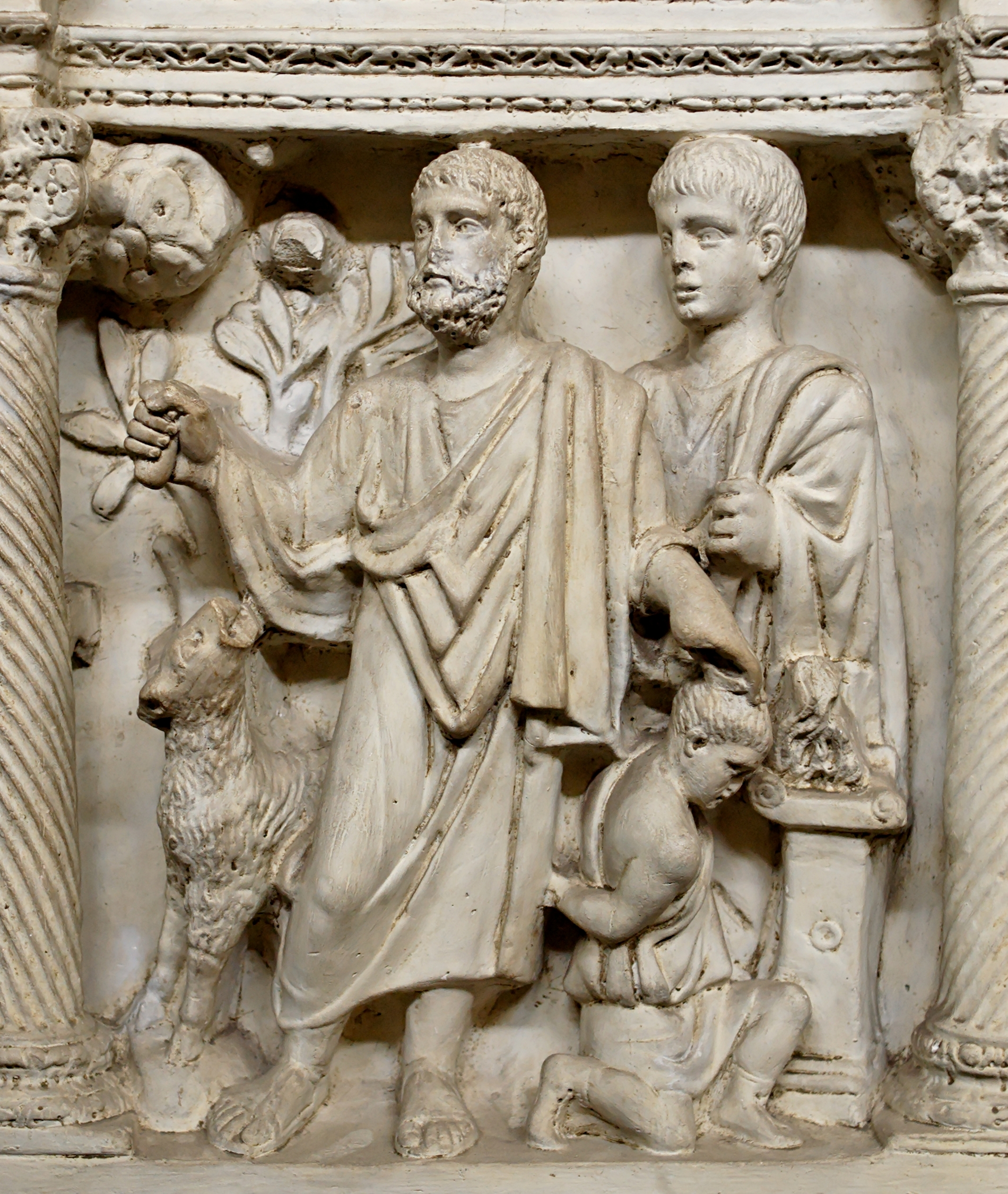
Detail of Junius Bassus sarcophagus, c. 395 A.D., Museum of the Treasury of the Basilica of Saint Peter, Vatican City

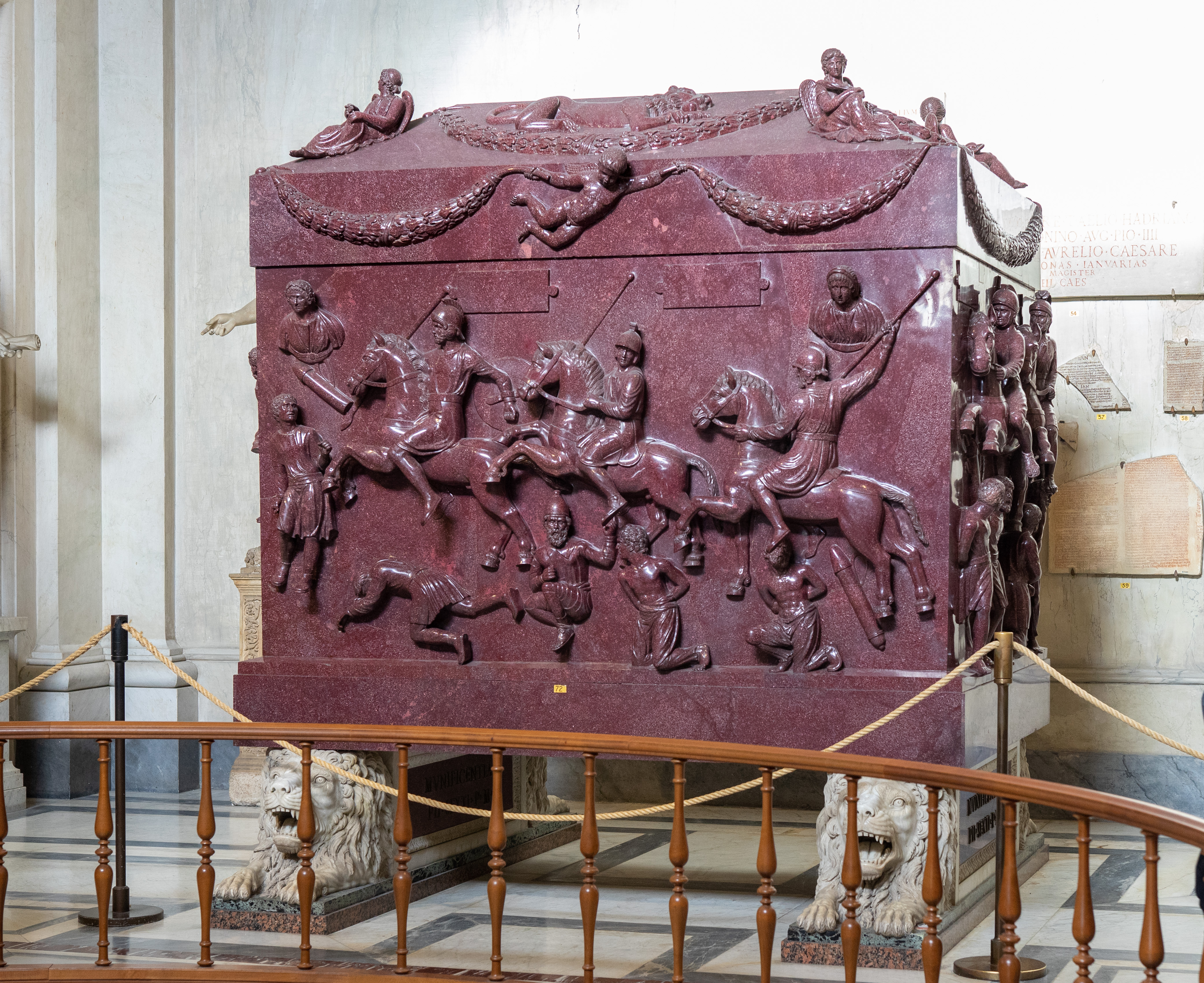
Sarcophagus of Helena, c. 320 A.D., Vatican Museums, Vatican City

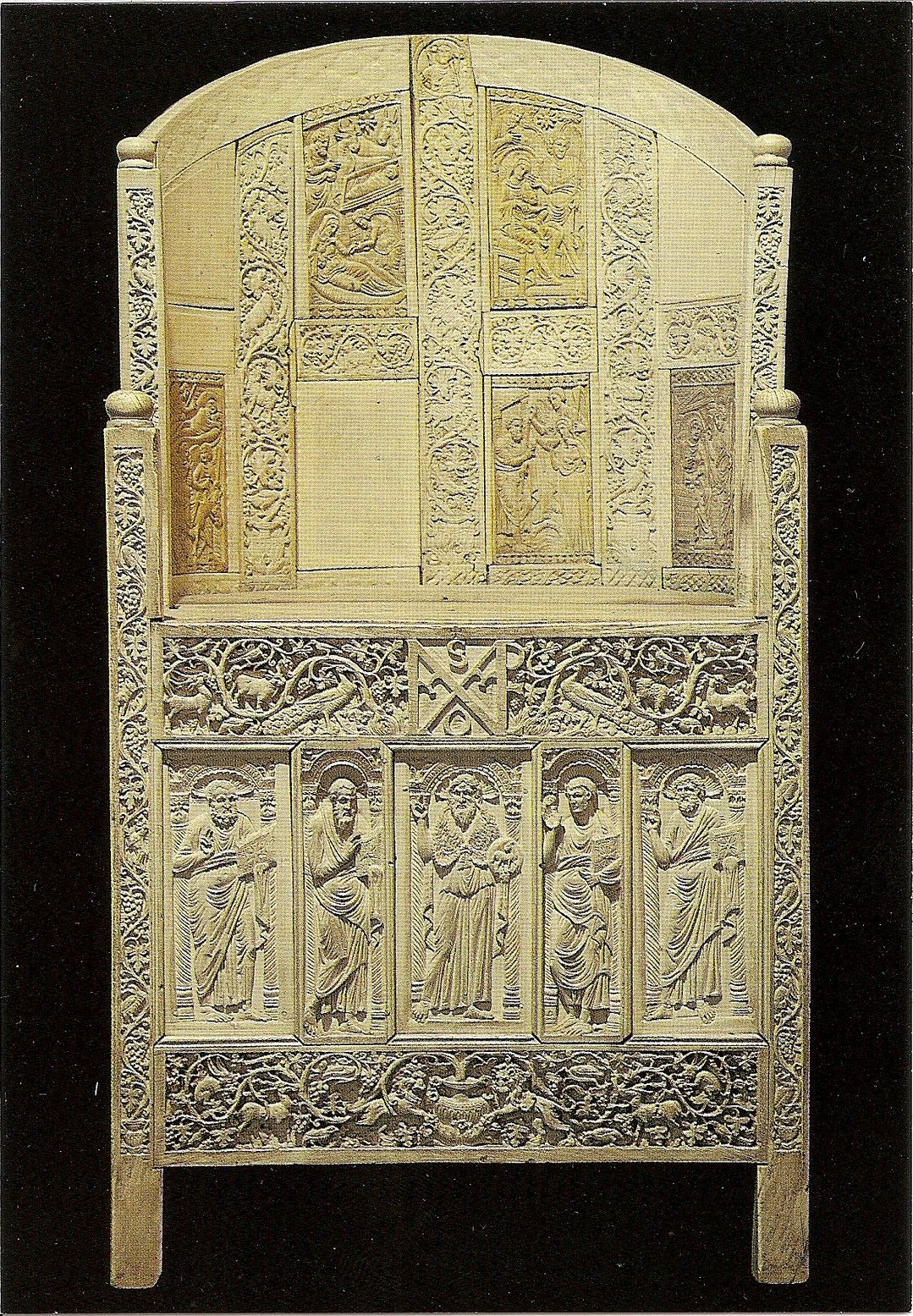
Throne of Maximian, c. 500-550 A.D., Archiepiscopal Museum, Ravenna

=== Sculpture of the Constantinian period (306 AD to 337 AD ca.) ===
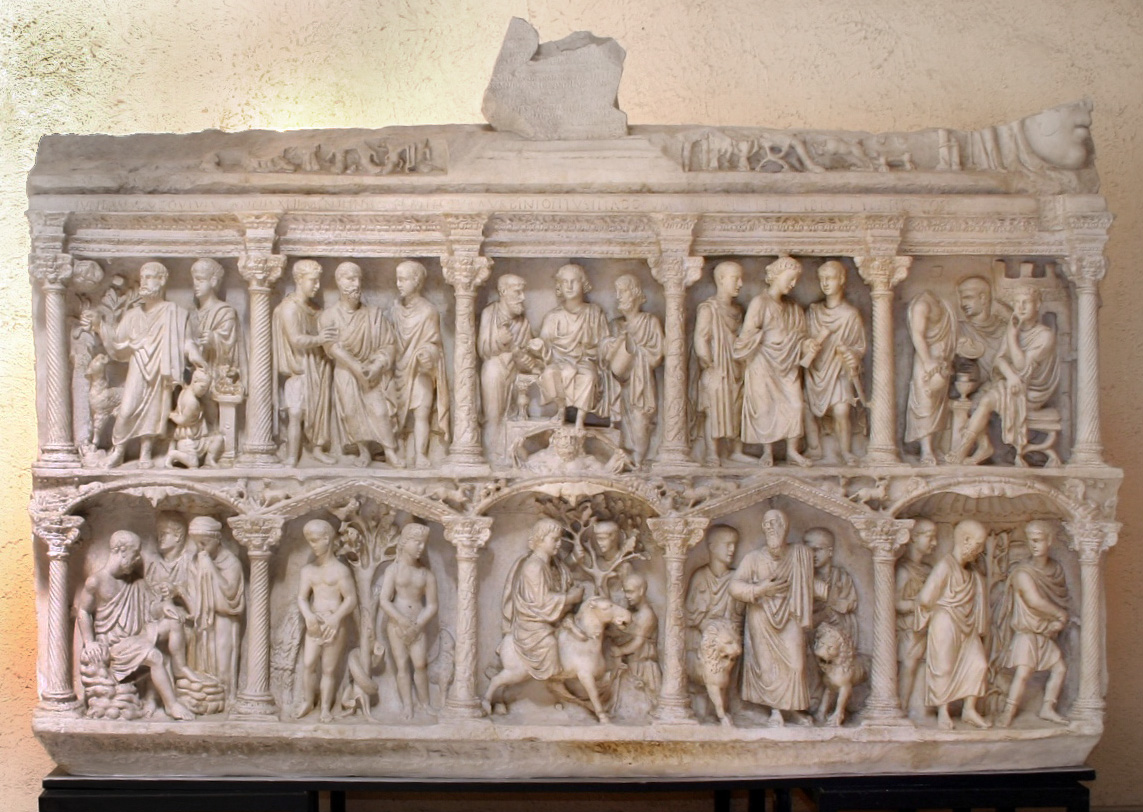
Sarcophagus of Junius Bassus, c. 359 A.D., Museo Vaticano

Constantinian sculpture represents a decisive turning point in the history of Western art, marking the transition from classical naturalism to the more symbolic aesthetic that would define subsequent centuries. This period should not be interpreted as a technical decline, but rather as the consolidation of a «new style» that prioritised the clarity of hierarchical and spiritual messages over anatomical mimesis. Under Constantine’s rule, official and Early Christian sculpture began to converge, employing similar visual languages to express both the new legitimacy of the Church and the absolute authority of the emperor.

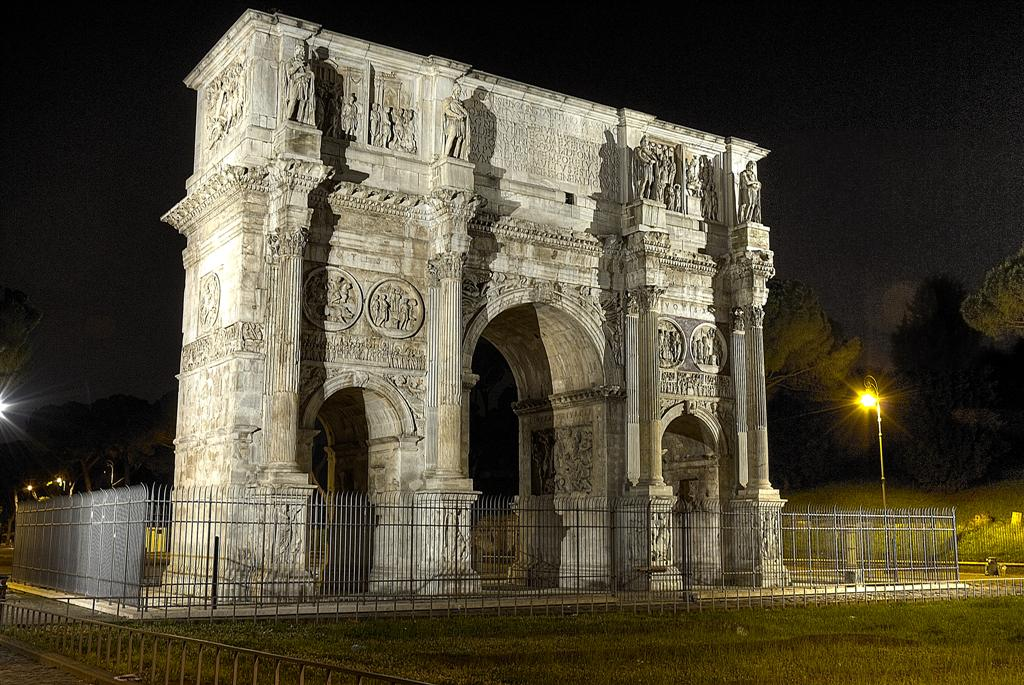
Arch of Constantine, ca. 312-316 A.D., Rome

In imperial portraiture, two divergent aesthetic tendencies can be observed. On the one hand, a classical current rooted in Augustan tradition persists, seeking formal idealisation, as seen in statues from the Baths of Constantine. On the other, an anti-classical and more expressive approach emerges, in which facial structure is reduced to a geometric, almost architectural schematism. The most notable example of this latter tendency is the colossal head of Constantine, dated between 324 and 337, where enlarged eyes and deeply incised pupils convey a sense of transcendent spirituality and hieratic stillness that anticipates Byzantine art.

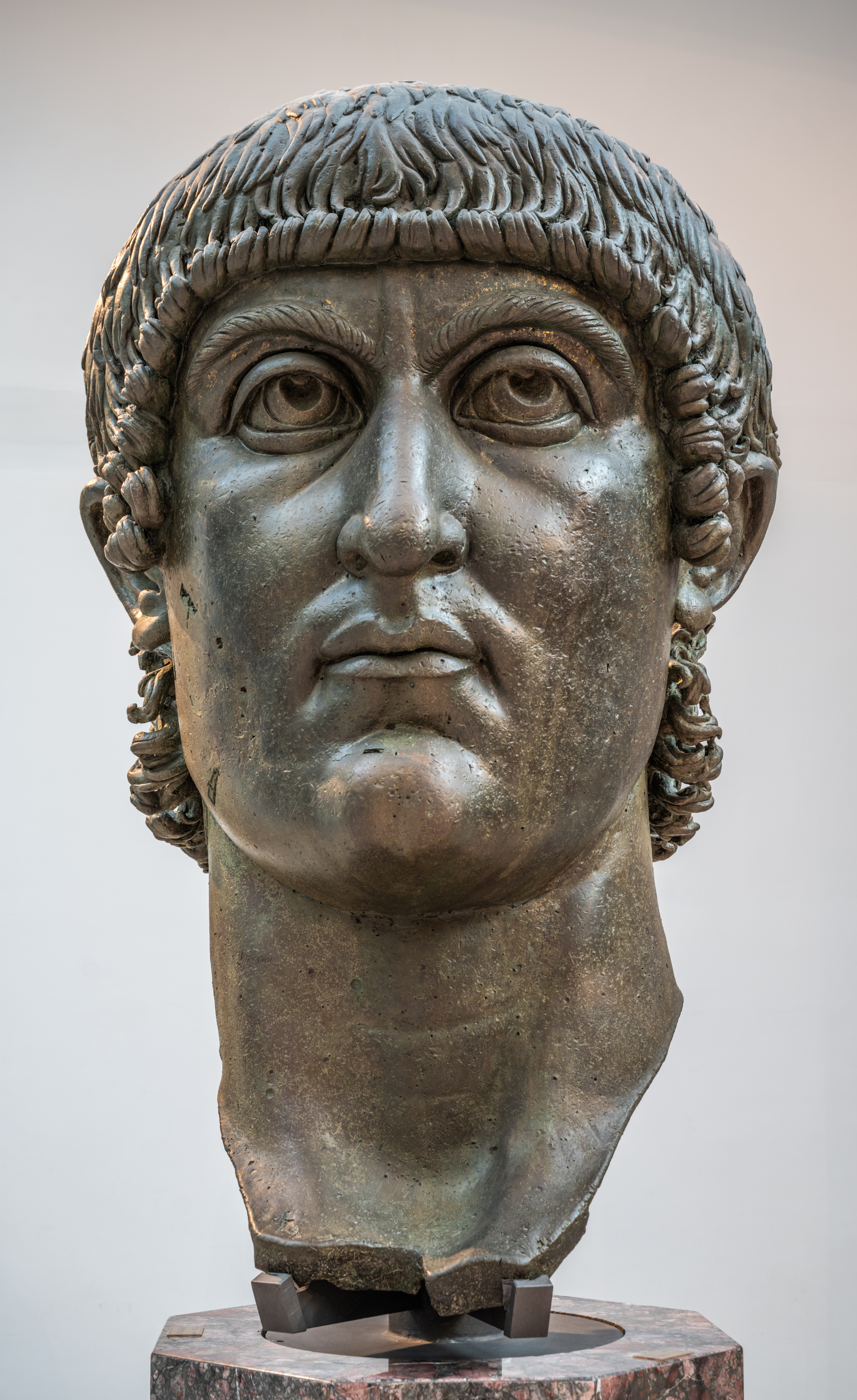
Head of Emperor Constantine I, 4th century A.D., Musei Capitolini, Rome

The Arch of Constantine in Rome, erected between 312 and 316, stands as the most complex monument of the period, combining reused earlier reliefs (spolia) with contemporary Constantinian friezes. While the reliefs of Trajan, Hadrian, and Antoninus follow the Hellenistic tradition, the Constantinian additions introduce a new sensibility defined by the rhythmic and paratactic arrangement of figures. In scenes such as the Oratio or the Congiarium, spatial depth is sacrificed in favour of a flattened surface, where the emperor’s figure is elevated above the crowd to emphasise his status as imperator invictus. Technically, there is a marked reduction in the use of the drill, replaced by more summary carving and fused volumes, possibly influenced by Alexandrian workshops accustomed to working with hard materials such as porphyry. The use of red porphyry became a powerful symbol of imperial prestige during this period. Quarried in Egypt, this material was reserved for representations of the Tetrarchy and Constantine’s dynasty, as seen in the group of the Tetrarchs in Venice or in the monumental sarcophagi of Helena and Constantina. The sarcophagus of Helena, decorated with battle scenes and barbarian captives, displays a vigorous relief that departs from classical spatial conventions, reflecting a preference for monumentality and the symbolic value of the imperial purple.

At the same time, Early Christian sarcophagus sculpture evolved from predominantly symbolic themes to more complex narrative cycles. During the first half of the fourth century, the repertoire expanded to include scenes from the New Testament and the Passio Christi, gradually replacing earlier pastoral imagery. The Dogmatic Sarcophagus and the Sarcophagus of Junius Bassus (d. 359) represent the culmination of this funerary tradition, with scenes organised into architectural registers that enhance the clarity and didactic purpose of the message of salvation. In these works, Christ often appears as a youthful, enthroned teacher, merging the classical image of the philosopher with that of a celestial ruler.

Finally, it is notable that sculpture in the round underwent a marked decline, becoming largely restricted to imperial or court portraiture. Early Christianity, wary of associations with pagan idolatry, favoured low relief integrated into the architectural fabric of new basilicas such as San Giovanni in Laterano or Old St Peter’s. This tendency towards flattening and the increasing use of symbols such as the Chi-Rho or the labarum in both public and funerary contexts marked the emergence of a visual language that prioritised the spiritual over the material.

== Early medieval sculpture (8th–late 10th century) ==
=== Carolingian art (8th–10th centuries) ===
==== The renovatio programme: a revival of classical and early Christian models on architecture ====
The concept of renovatio in the medieval world should not be understood as a simple aesthetic imitation of antiquity, but as a deliberate political and religious program aimed at restoring an idealized past, centered on the greatness of the Roman Empire and the purity of the Early Christian Church. Unlike later humanist movements, it did not seek to break with tradition, but to legitimize it by recovering the auctoritas and prestige associated with figures such as Constantine and the Roman emperors. This approach deeply influenced monumental architecture, the visual arts, and political ideology, establishing a continuous dialogue between inherited traditions and the conscious emulation of Late Antique models.

The first major manifestation of this program occurred in the Carolingian period, especially after the coronation of Charlemagne in 800 as restorer of the Western Empire. Artistically, this involved a return to monumentality and to the representation of the human figure, drawing on manuscripts, ivories, and minor arts of the 4th and 5th centuries. In architecture, renovatio led to the revival of the Early Christian basilica, with buildings such as Old St. Peter’s, San Giovanni in Laterano, and San Paolo fuori le mura serving as direct models to assert continuity with Christian Rome. The abbey of Fulda stands as a paradigmatic example, conceived as a replica of St. Peter’s. Likewise, the palace complex at Aachen was designed as a “New Rome,” where the Palatine Chapel —partly inspired by San Vitale in Ravenna— functioned as a ceremonial center incorporating Late Antique elements, such as the equestrian statue of Theoderic intended to evoke that of Marcus Aurelius. This cultural renewal was supported by extensive manuscript production and the adoption of Caroline minuscule, symbolizing order and unity.

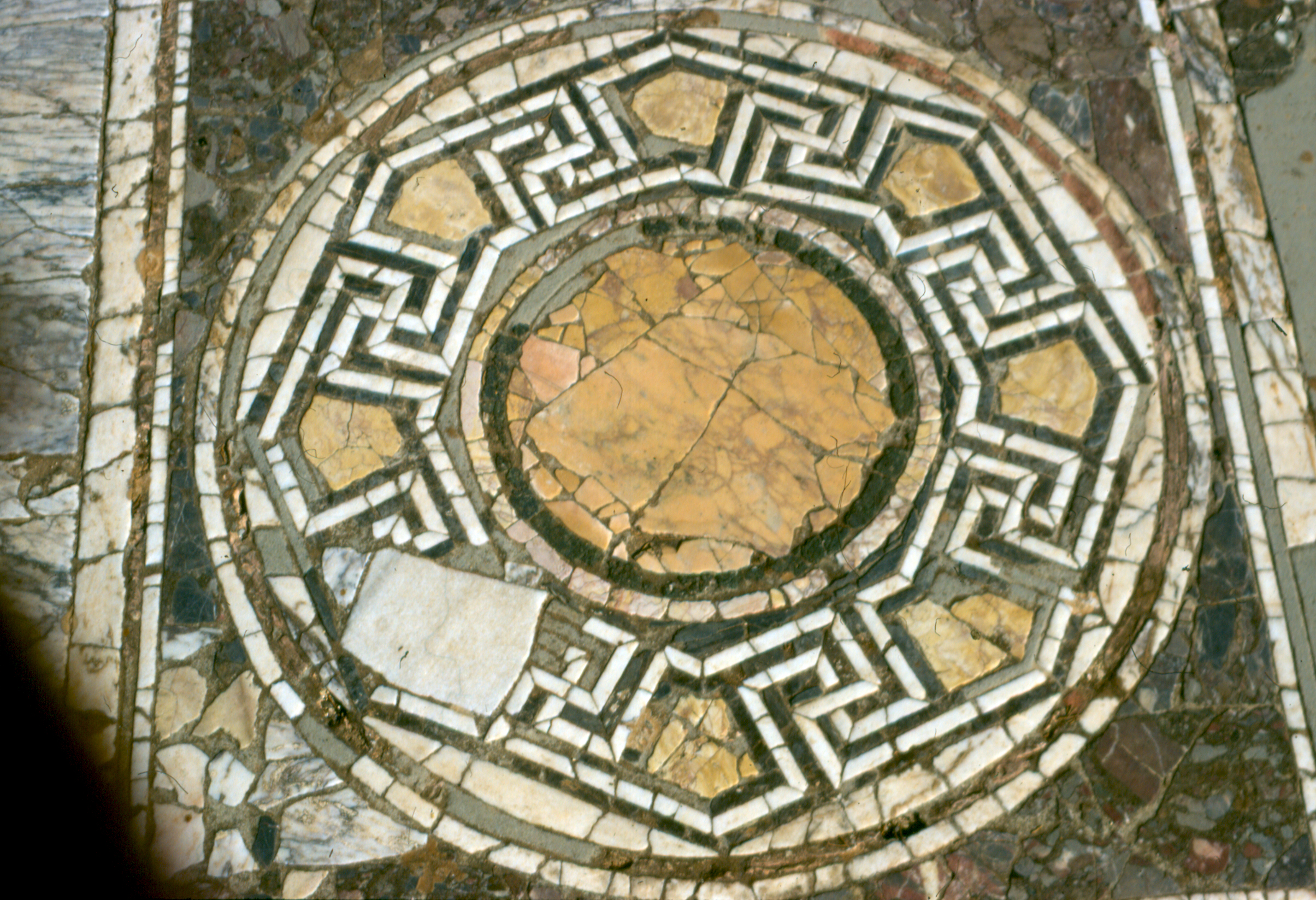
Opus sectile in the Insula di Giasone Magno a Cirene

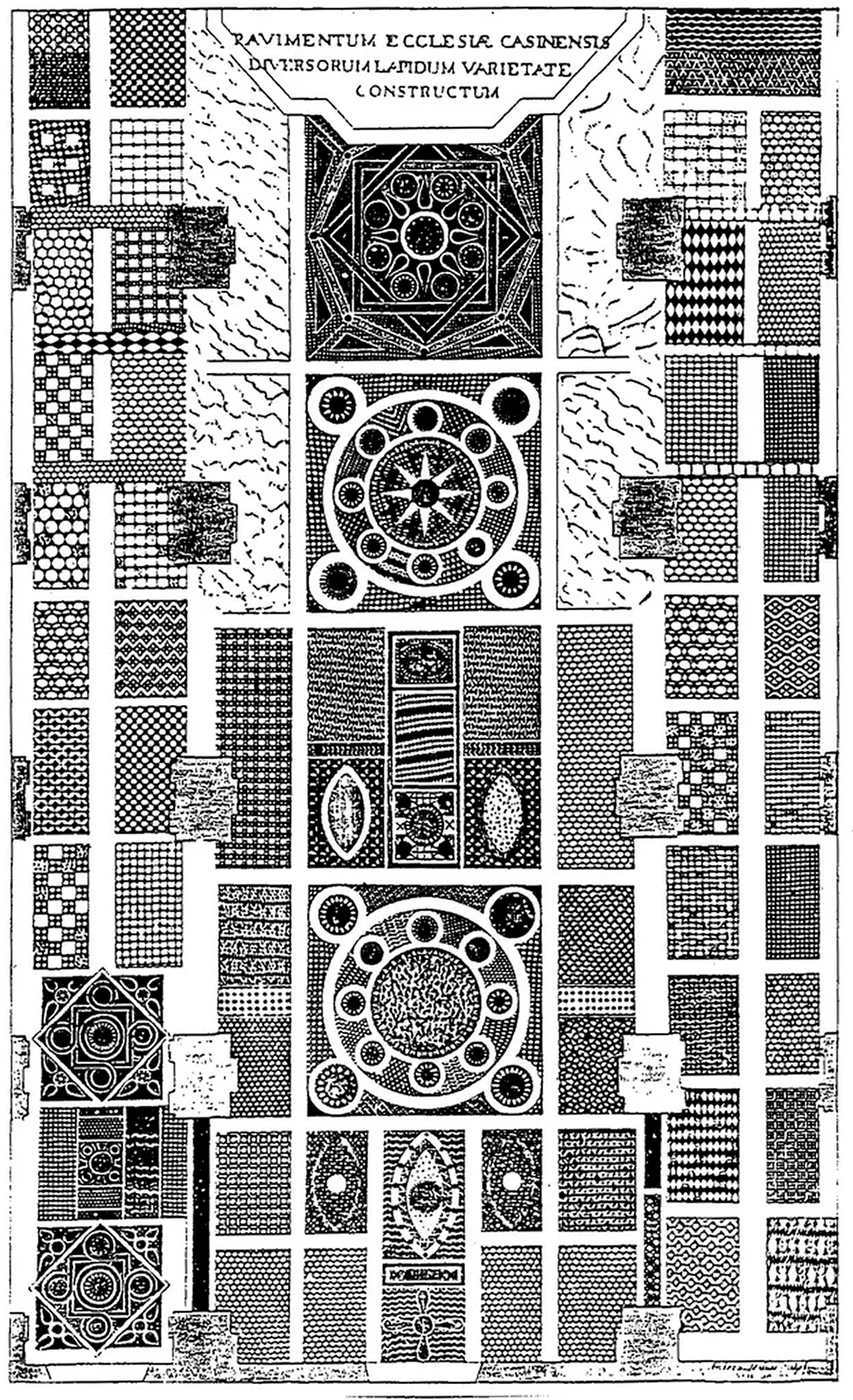
Reconstruction of the pavement of the ancient basilica

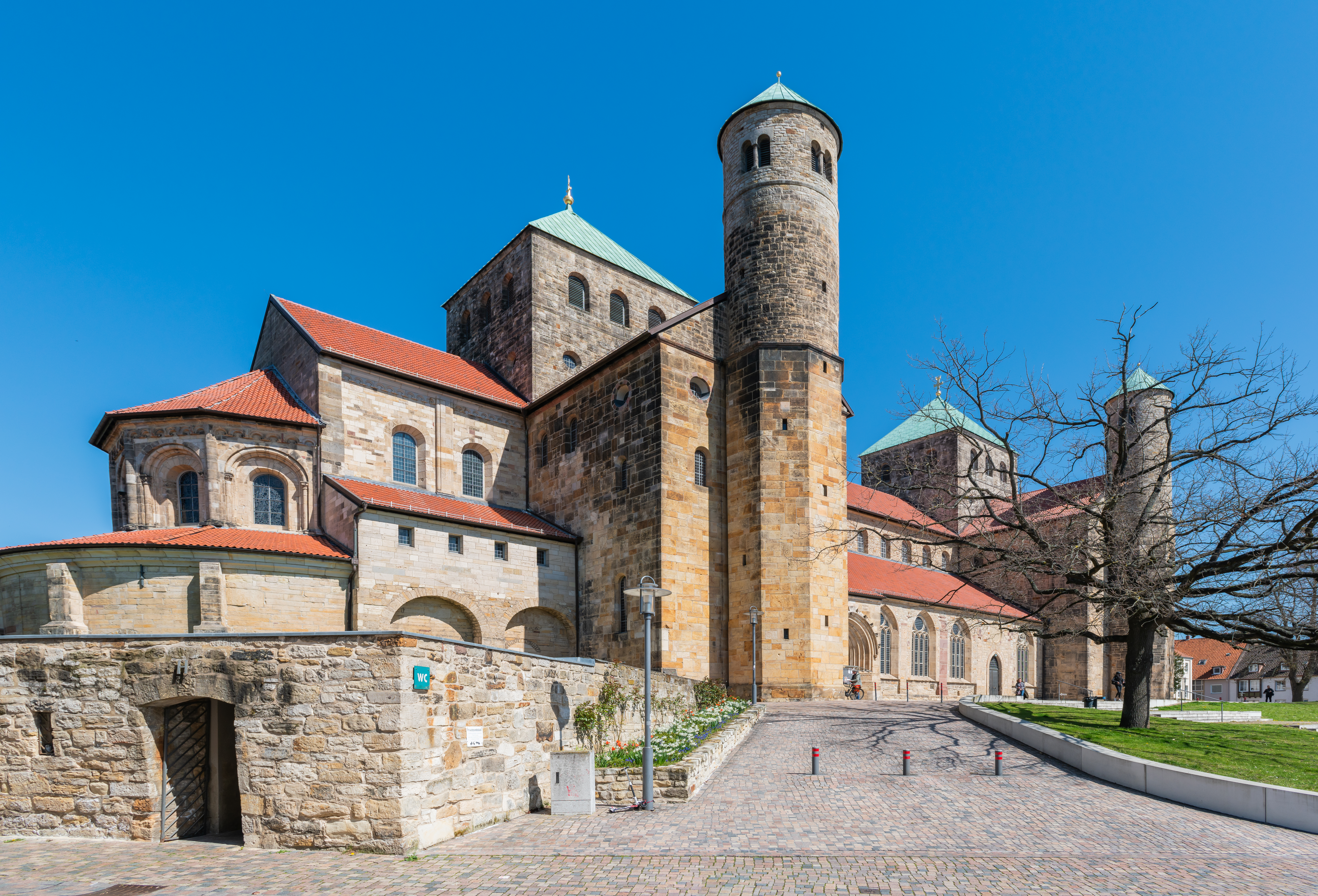
Church of Saint Michael at Hildesheim

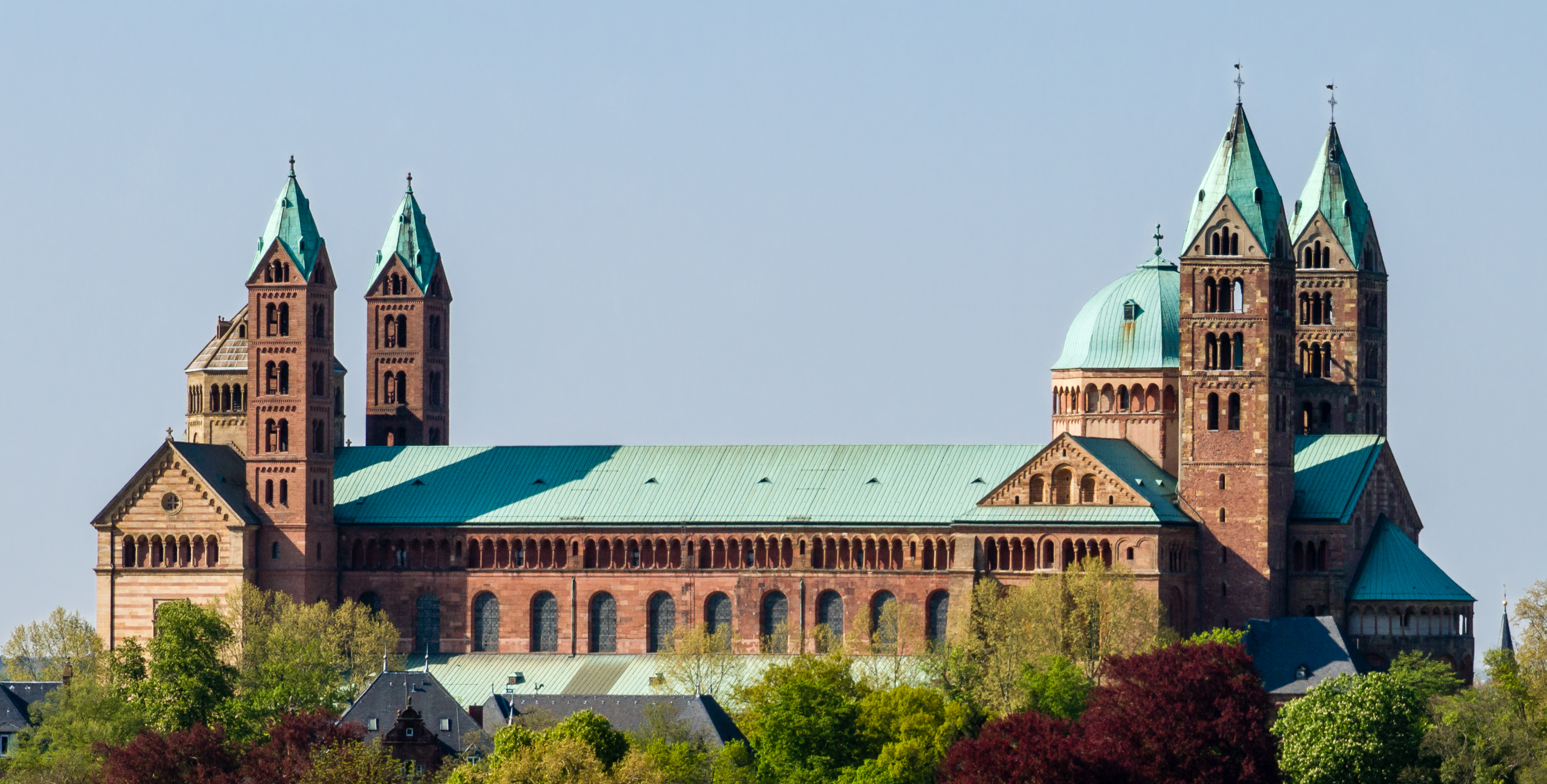
Cathedral of Speyer

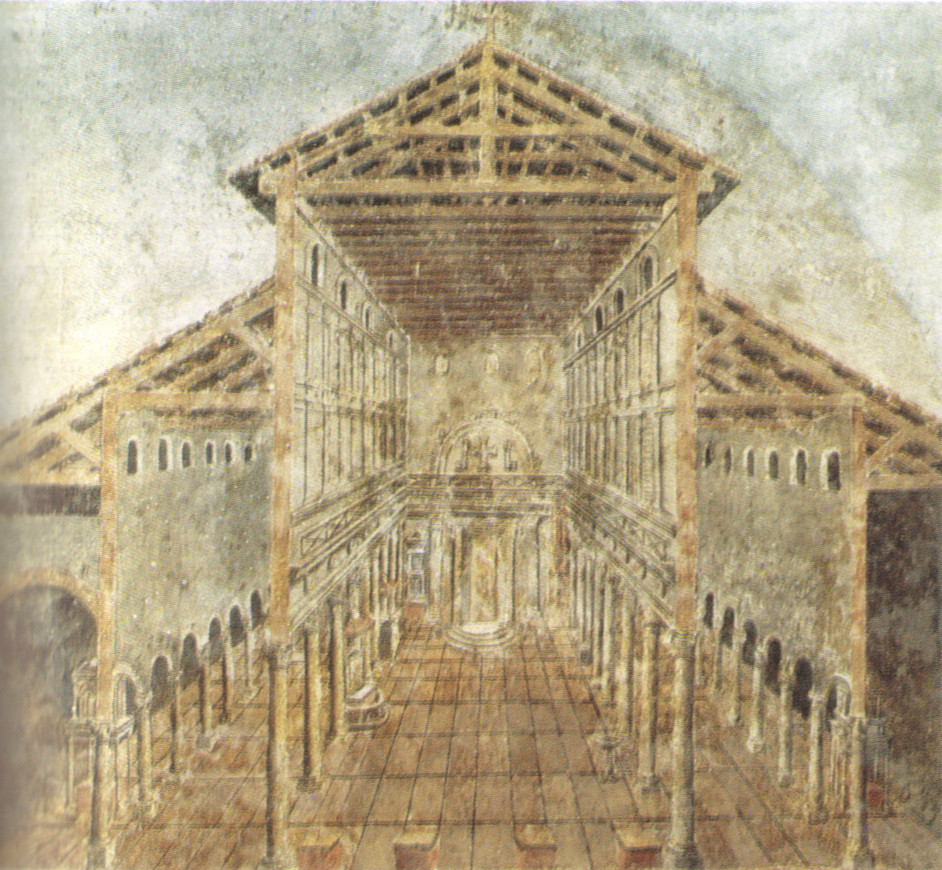
Fresco of the look of the old Saint Peter's Basilica

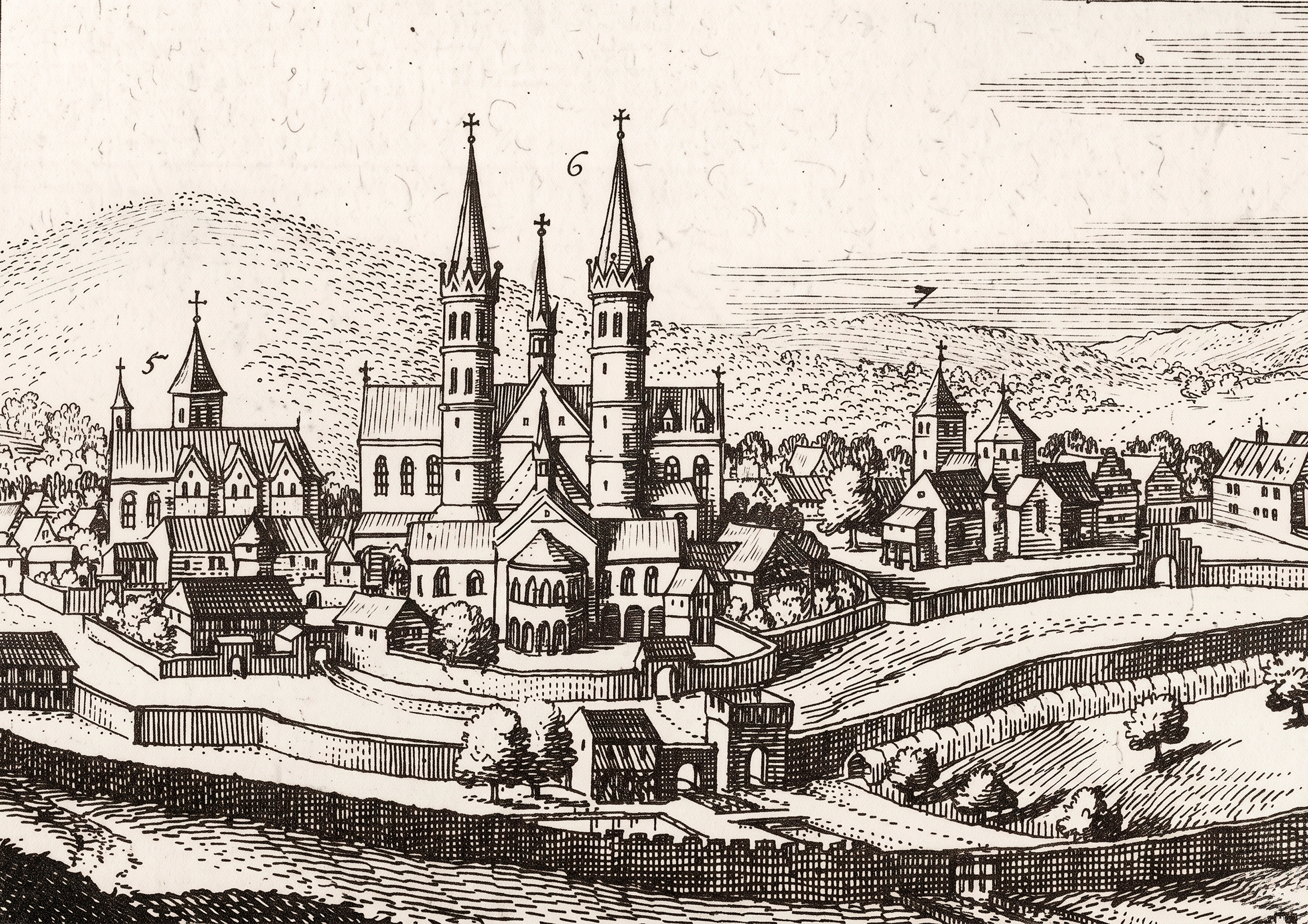
View of the ancient abbey of Fulda

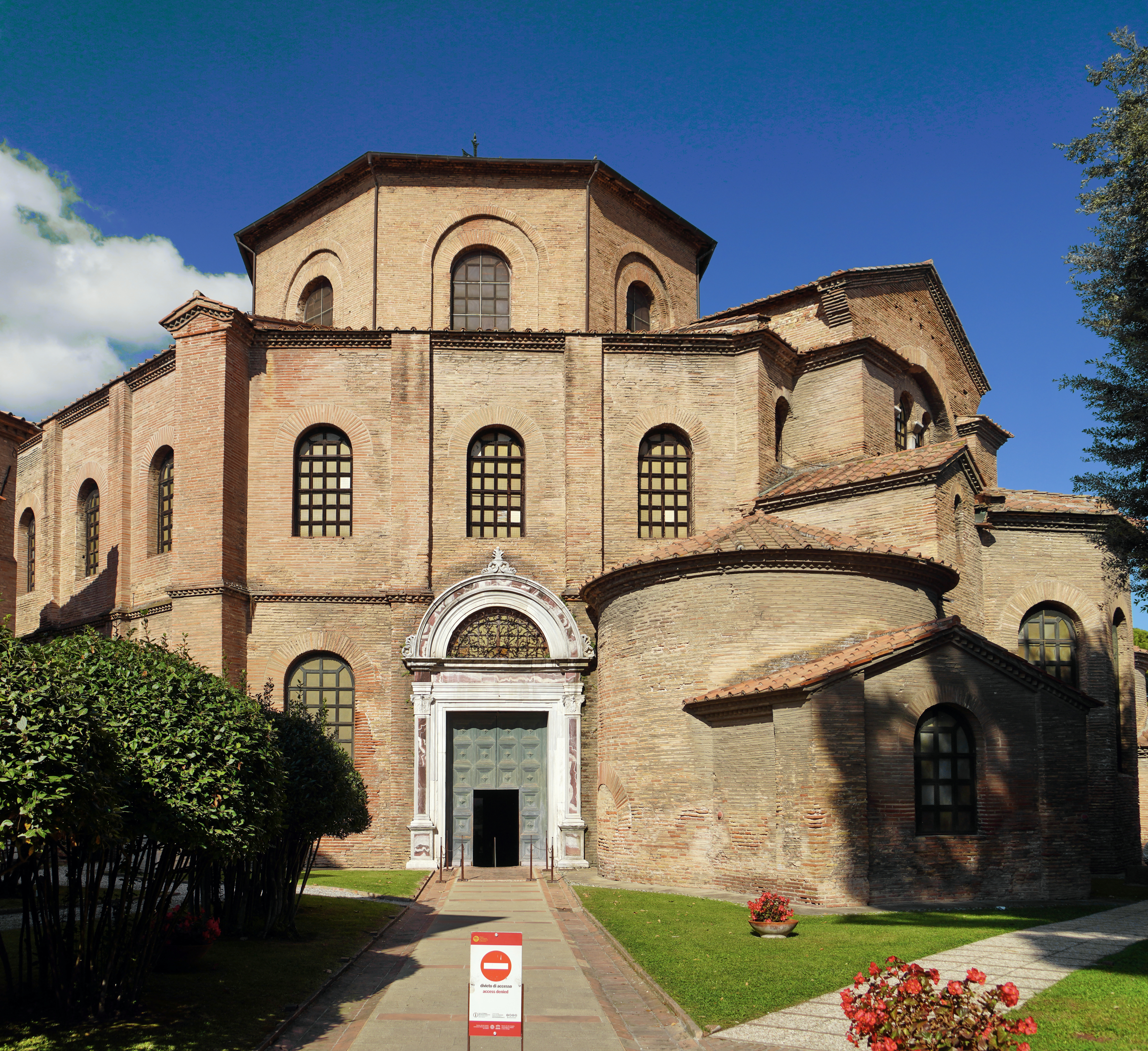
Basilica of San Vitale at Ravenna

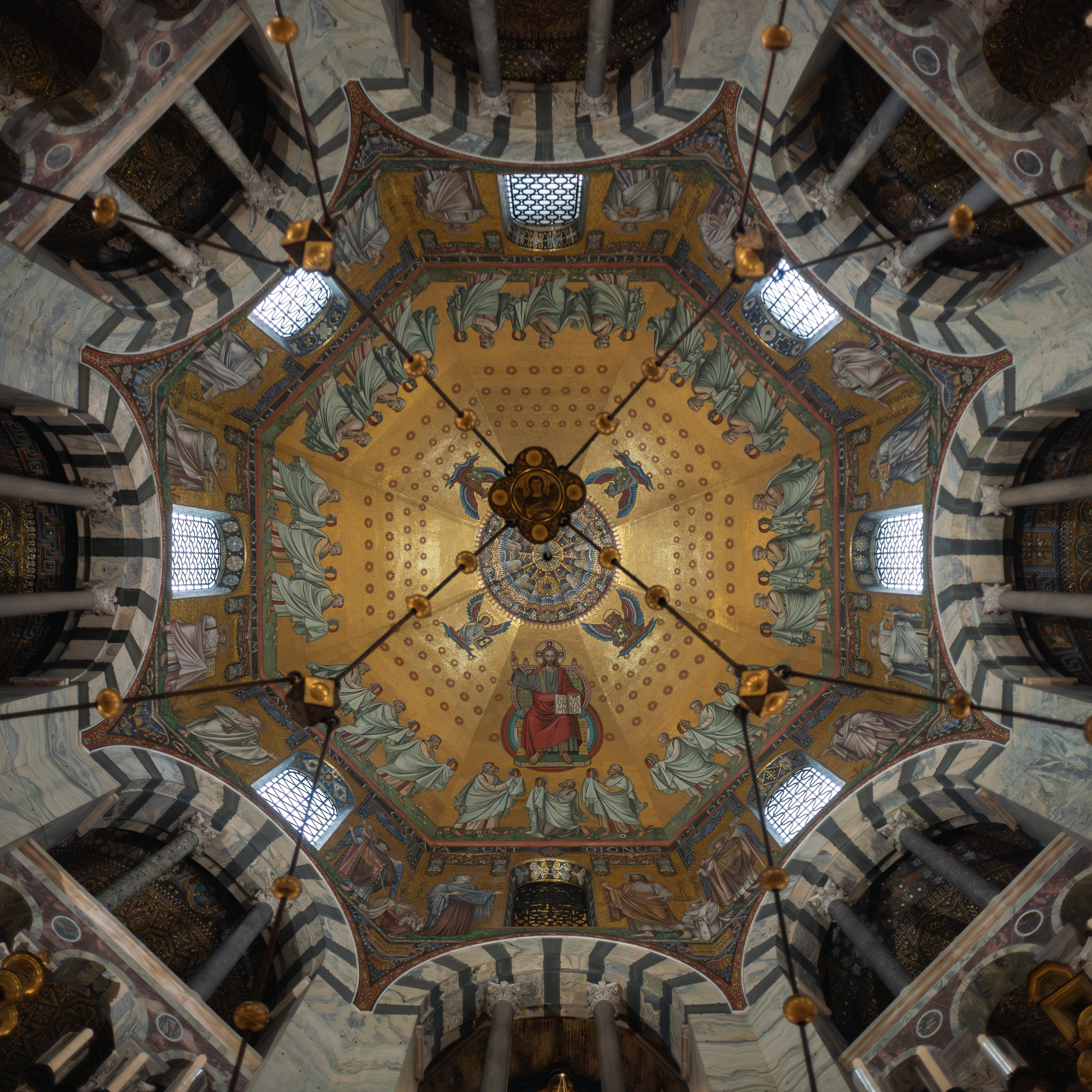
Palatine Chapel (Aachen Dom) at Aachen

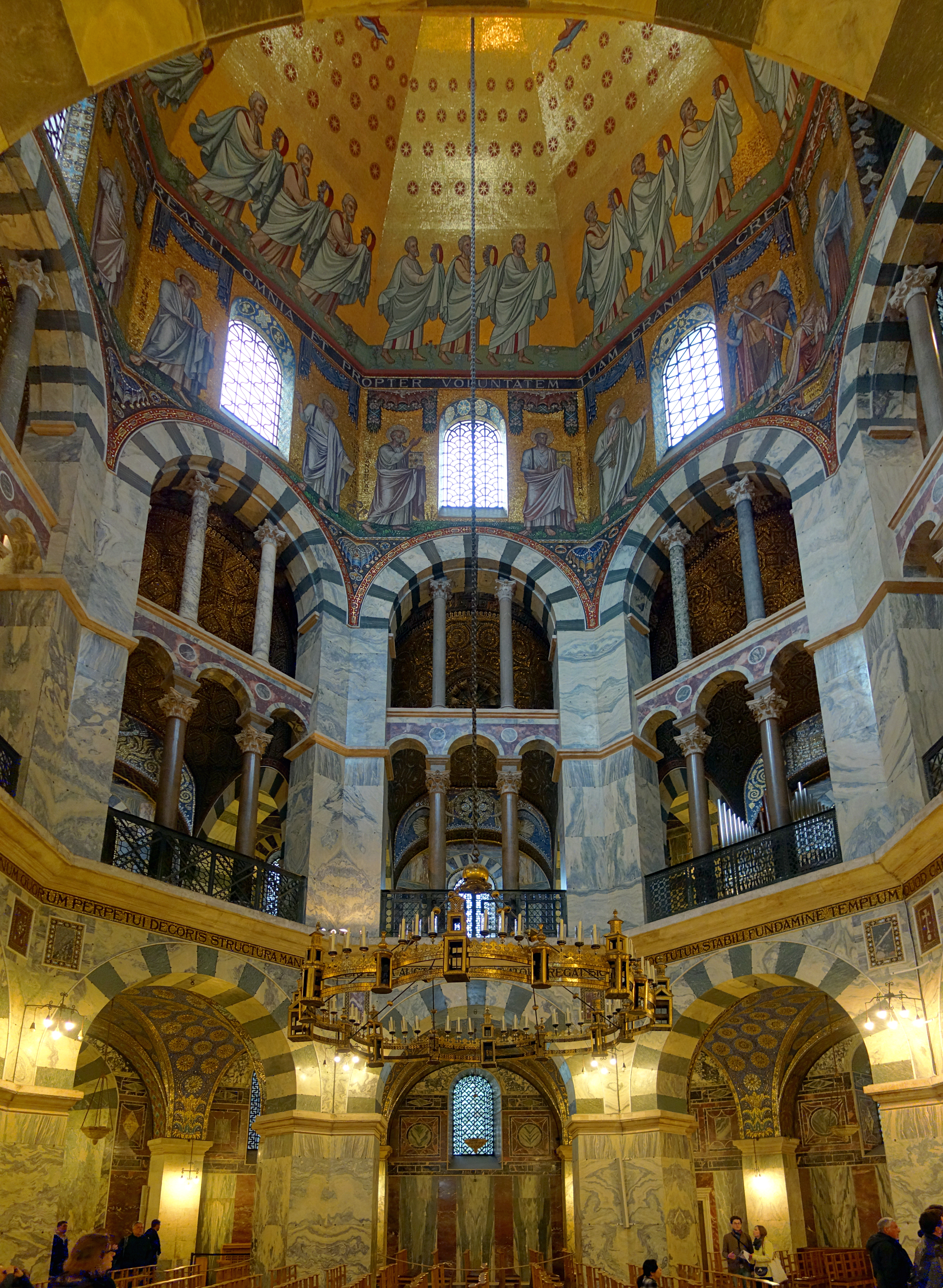

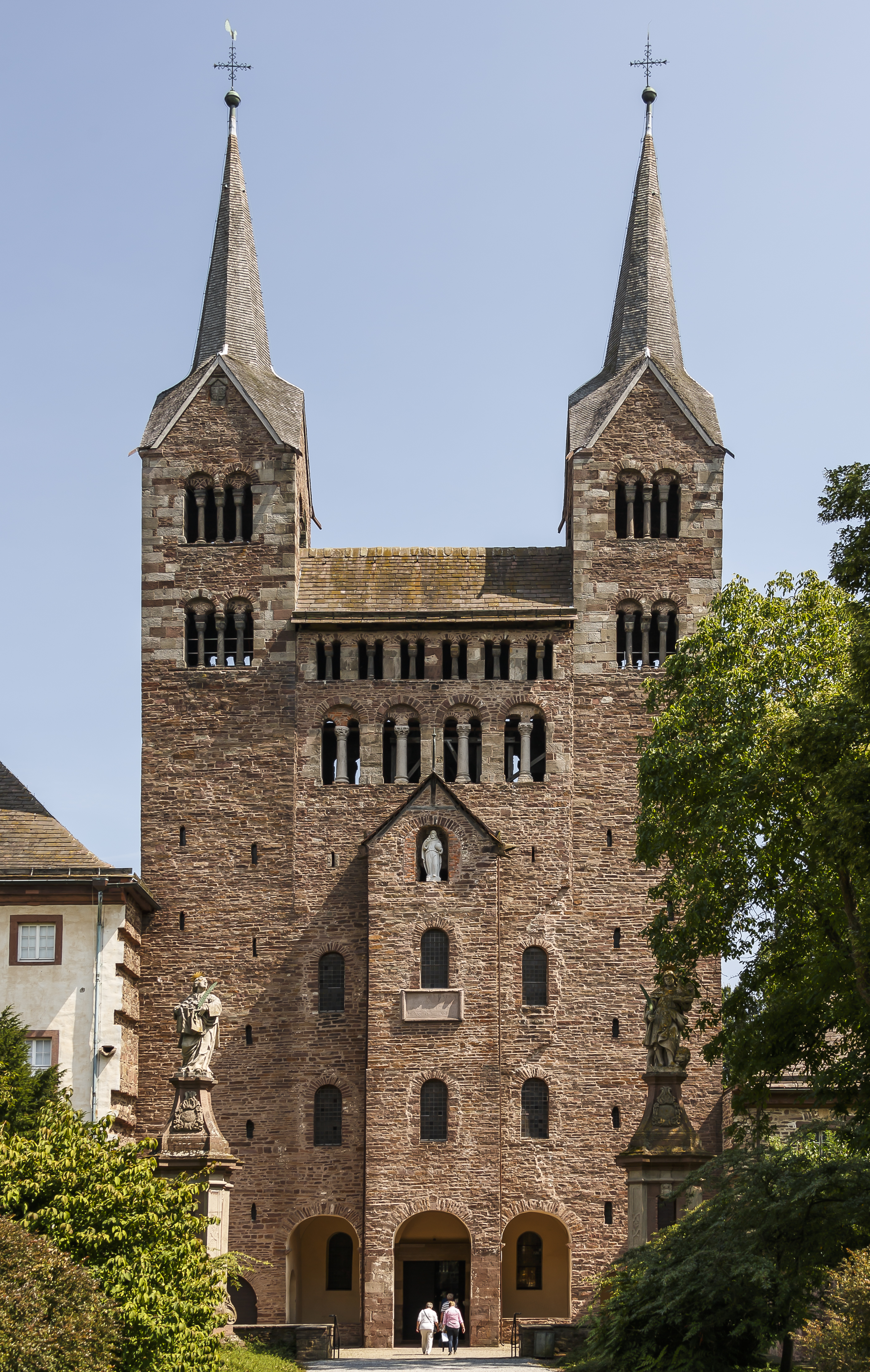
Corvey Abbey Westwerk

Under the Ottonian dynasty, particularly during the reign of Otto III at the end of the 10th century, renovatio acquired a more mystical and ecumenical dimension, seeking to unite Roman imperial authority with Byzantine spirituality. Otto established his residence in Rome, adopted titles such as Servus apostolorum, and issued documents bearing the formula Renovatio Imperii Romanorum. Ottonian art reflected this vision through a renewed emphasis on material splendor and ceremonial hierarchy, combining Carolingian spatial concepts with more expansive architectural forms, as seen in St. Michael’s at Hildesheim and Speyer Cathedral. In manuscript illumination, the personification of Rome often occupies a central place, symbolizing the shift of political focus toward the Mediterranean. The collaboration between Otto III and Gerbert of Aurillac (later Pope Sylvester II) further illustrates the ambition to restore a universal order uniting Empire and Papacy.

In the 11th century, the idea of renovatio was reshaped within the context of the Gregorian Reform, where it became associated with the libertas Ecclesiae and the recovery of the form of the primitive Church (Robinson 2004; Eco 2018). This led to a renewed interest in Early Christian architectural models, as seen in the reconstruction of Montecassino under Abbot Desiderius, who employed Byzantine artists to revive techniques such as mosaic and opus sectile.
