= Guy Brousseau =

French mathematics educationalist (1933–2024

- Born: 4 February 1933; Taza, French Morocco
- Died: 15 February 2024 (aged 91)
- Occupation: Mathematician
- Honours: Felix Klein Medal (2003)

Guy Brousseau (4 February 1933 – 15 February 2024) was a French mathematics educationalist.

== Early life and education ==
Guy Brousseau was born on 4 February 1933, in Taza, Morocco. From an early age, he wanted to become a primary school teacher, which he did for several years until he was recruited as an assistant at Bordeaux University. From 1967 to 1969, he was Director of the Centre de recherches pour l'enseignement des mathématiques at the CRDP de Bordeaux, and in 1969 became Assistant of Mathematics at the Faculté des Sciences de Bordeaux. In 1968, he obtained a bachelor's degree in mathematics and a bachelor's degree in educational science.

== Career and research ==
Brousseau began his career as a teacher in 1953. He began publishing in 1961, followed by a textbook for the first year of elementary school (1965), and continued to publish in the scientific field. In the late 1960s, after obtaining a degree in mathematics, he joined the University of Bordeaux.

Brousseau founded COREM (Centre pour l'Observation et la Recherche sur l'Enseignement des Mathématiques), which he ran from 1973 to 1998 at the Jules Michelet elementary school in Talence (Gironde). The school went on to achieve international renown. He subsequently founded the LADIST (Laboratoire Aquitain de Didactique des Sciences et Techniques), which supported COREM.

In 1986, he obtained a doctorate in science and, in 1991, became a university professor at the newly created IUFM d'Aquitaine, where he worked until 1998. He decided to create the CREM (Centre de Recherche pour l'Enseignement des Mathématiques) in Bordeaux following his meeting with André Lichnerowicz. He was professor emeritus at the IUFM d'Aquitaine. He also held honorary doctorates from the University of Montreal (1997) and the University of Geneva (2004).

His main theoretical contribution is the theory of didactic situations, a theory initiated in the early 1970s. Together with Gérard Vergnaud's conceptual field theory and Yves Chevallard's anthropological theory of didactics, it forms one of the three main theoretical frameworks of the French school of mathematics didactics.

Brousseau published numerous works on mathematics from 1965 to 2001, with the help of numerous collaborators.

Brousseau carried out a large number of research and training missions in Europe, Latin America and North America, as well as in North Africa and Southeast Asia. His research focuses on the teaching of natural and decimal numbers, probability, statistics, geometry, elementary algebra, logic and reasoning.

Brousseau died on 15 February 2024, at the age of 91.

== Awards and honours ==
In 2003, Brousseau was awarded the first Felix Klein Medal by the International Commission on Mathematical Instruction.

== Publications ==
- Brousseau, Guy (1965). Les mathématiques du cours préparatoire collaboration de G. Ratier.
- Brousseau, Guy (1990). "Le contrat didactique : le milieu" (PDF). Recherches en Didactique des Mathématiques, la Pensée Sauvage (in French). 9 (3): 309–336.
- Brousseau, Guy (January 2009). "L'erreur en mathématiques du point de vue didactique". Tangente Education (in French) (7): 4–7.
- Brousseau, Guy; Felix, Lucienne (1972). Mathématique et thèmes d'activité à l'école maternelle (in French).
- Brousseau, Guy (1986). Théorisation des phénomènes d'enseignement des Mathématiques (in French).
- Brousseau, Guy; Warfield, Virginia (1998) "The case of GAEL". in Journal of Mathematical Behavior, No. 18 (1), 1–46,
- Brousseau, Guy (2000) Que peut-on enseigner en mathématiques à l'école primaire et pourquoi ? (in French) Repères-IREM. (38): pp. 7–10.
- Brousseau, Guy (2001). Les erreurs des élèves en mathématiques : Étude dans le cadre de la théorie des situations didactiques (in French). Petit x 57, 5–30 (IREM et CRDP de Grenoble)
- Brousseau, Guy (2004). L'émergence d'une science de la didactique des mathématiques : motifs et enjeux (in French). Repères-IREM. (55): pp. 19–34.
- Brousseau, Guy (1998). La théorie des situations didactiques. Recueil de textes de Didactique des mathématiques 1970-1990" présentés par M. Cooper et N. Balacheff, Rosamund Sutherland et Virginia Warfield (in French). (La pensée sauvage, Grenoble).
- He will then publish on local media (18 Cahiers de l’IREM de Bordeaux de 1969 à 1978).
- Most of these texts have been published in magazines such as R.D.M. or in a collection published in English by Kluwer in 1997 under the title: Theory of Didactical Situations in Mathematics.
- N. and G. BROUSSEAU (1987). Rationnels et décimaux dans la scolarité obligatoire (in French).

== See also ==
- Didactic method
