= Didáctica Tecnológica =

Influence of technology on didactics

Technological didactics is an English translation of Didáctica Tecnológica, a common term in Spanish educational discourse. It refers to the study of the influence of technology upon didactics. This field seeks to elucidate the role of technology within the various educational settings, and its direct and indirect influence upon the process of teaching and learning.

It starts with a specific analysis of each of the didactic components: objectives, content, method, medium, evaluation, and organizational forms; and finally a high-level analysis of the relationships among each of those components, always incorporating the technological component.

As a distinct body of knowledge relating to teaching methods, technological didactics developed during the 1990s, with the introduction of new technology into teaching. Linguistic, cultural, and cognitive perspectives have all contributed.
