= Widonids =

Noble Italian family (fl. 9th century)

Widonids Guideschi
- Country: Carolingian Empire; Holy Roman Empire; Kingdom of Italy
- Founded: 8th century
- Founder: Guy of Nantes
- Final ruler: Lambert of Italy
- Titles: Holy Roman Emperor; King of Italy; Duke of Spoleto; Duke of Benevento; Prefect (Margrave) of the March of Brittany; Prefect (Margrave) of the Eastern March; Count of Nantes
- Traditions: Roman Catholicism
- Dissolution: 9th century
- Cadet branches: Salian dynasty (?)

The Widonids (Italian: Guideschi) (Note: Italian: Guideschi or Guidoni; German: Guidonen or Widonen;) were an Italian family of Frankish origin prominent in the 9th century.

Frankish kingdoms (West-Francia, East-Francia, Italy, Upper Burgundy and Lower Burgundy) at the end of the 9th century. The Kingdom of Italy, with the Duchy of Spoleto is highlighted in pink.

They were an aggressive dynasty that expanded their power base, the Duchy of Spoleto, at the expense of the neighboring Papal States and in alliance with the Carolingian dynasty, to whom they were related through the female line. Through this relation, the Widonids were able to aspire to the imperial throne. The Widonids and the Rorgonids competed for control of the Breton March through much of the ninth century.

The first member of the family to attain prominence was Lambert's son Guy I, who was made duke of Spoleto by the Emperor Lothair I in 842. He was active in Lotharingia and Italy, even marrying a local Lombard woman, Itta (or Itana), the daughter of Sico of Benevento. His descendants continued to rule Spoleto until 897.

The most famous Guidoni were Guy III and his son Lambert II. Both became kings of Italy and emperors. Guy IV of Spoleto also became Duke of Benevento.

== Genealogy ==
Widonids and their relatives, with the names of kings and emperors bolded.

**Charlemagne** emperor	Lambert	Teutberga
**Pepin of Italy** king of Italy	Guy of Nantes warden of the Breton March	Frodoals count of Vannes
Adelaide of Italy	Lambert I of Nantes count of Nantes, duke of Spoleto	Itta	**Lothair I** emperor, king of Middle Francia
Guy I of Spoleto duke of Spoleto	Ida of Benevento daughter of Sico of Benevento	Lambert II of Nantes count of Nantes	Rotrude of Middle Francia	**Lothair II** king of Lotharingia
Lambert I of Spoleto duke of Spoleto	Judith of Friuli	**Guy III of Spoleto** emperor, king of Italy	Ageltrude of Benevento	Rothilde of Spoleto	Adalbert I, Margrave of Tuscany
Guy II of Spoleto duke of Spoleto	**Lambert of Italy** emperor, king of Italy	Adalbert II, Margrave of Tuscany	Bertha of Lotharingia
Guy IV of Spoleto duke of Spoleto	Itta of Spoleto	Guaimar I of Salerno; Prince of Salerno	Adalbert I of Ivrea margrave of Ivrea	Ermengarde of Tuscany	Guy, Margrave of Tuscany	Lambert, Margrave of Tuscany
Dauferid Dynasty princes of Salerno	Anscar of Spoleto duke of Spoleto
