= Guy III of Spoleto =

Emperor in Italy from 891 to 894

- Emperor of the Romans
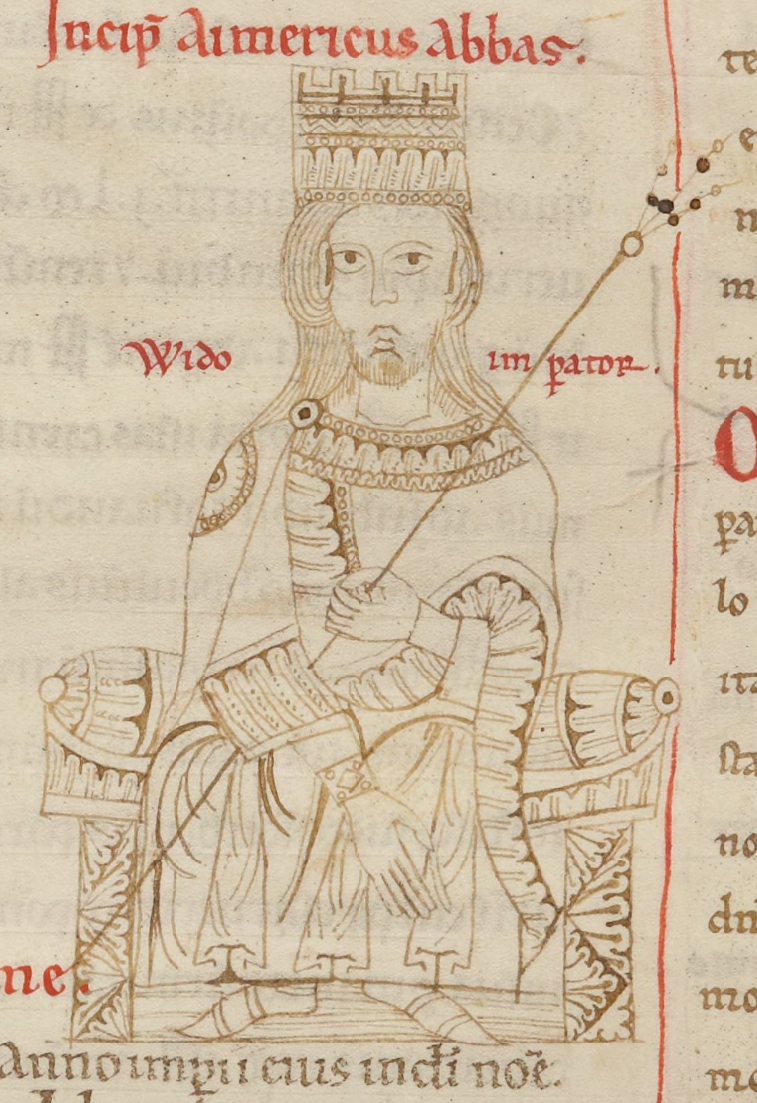
- Guy depicted as emperor in the 12th-century cartulary of San Clemente

Emperor in Italy
- Reign: 891–894
- Coronation: 21 February 891, Rome
- Predecessor: Charles III (as Emperor of the Carolingian Empire)
- Successor: Lambert

King of Italy
- Reign: February 889 – 894
- Predecessor: Berengar I
- Successor: Lambert

King of West Francia (in opposition to Odo)
- Reign: January 888 – November 888
- Coronation: February 888, Langres
- Predecessor: Charles the Fat
- Successor: Odo of France as sole ruler
- Died: 12 December 894; Taro River, Italy
- Burial: Parma Cathedral
- Spouse: Ageltrude
- Issue: Lambert
- House: Guideschi
- Father: Guy I
- Mother: Itta of Benevento
- Signum manus

Guy III of Spoleto (Italian: Guido, German: Wido, died 12 December 894) was King of Italy since 889, and Emperor since 891. Initially, he was Margrave of Camerino from 880, and became Duke of Spoleto and Camerino in 883. After the deposition of emperor Charles in late 887, Guy attempted to gain the throne of West Francia but failed, and then tried to capture Lotharingia. In March 888, he was crowned as king in the southern Lotharingian city of Langres, but soon returned to Italy in order to claim that realm. His main opponent in Lombardy was king Berengar I, who claimed the rule over Italy since late 887. During the second half of 888, Guy gained control over much of northern and central Italy. In 889, he was crowned King of Italy in Pavia, by the Pope Stephen V. In 891, the same pope crowned him Emperor in Rome, and also crowned Guy's son and co-ruler Lambert as King of Italy. In 892, Guy also secured the imperial title for Lambert, who was crowned co-emperor by the Pope Formosus in Ravenna. Guy died in 894, and was succeeded by Lambert.

== Early life ==
Guy was the second son of Guy I of Spoleto and Itta, daughter of Sico of Benevento. Guy I was the son of Lambert I of Nantes and his second wife, Adelaide of Lombardy, who was a daughter of Charlemagne's second eldest son, Pepin of Italy. In 842, the former Duchy of Spoleto, which had been donated to the Papacy by Charlemagne, was resurrected by the Franks to be held against Byzantine catapans to the south, as a Frankish border territory by a dependent margrave.

Consequently, Guy's family had been important players in Italian politics since the early ninth century. Although in 876 Guy and his elder brother, Lambert, Duke of Spoleto, had been commissioned by Charles the Bald to accompany Pope John VIII on a trip to Naples in order to break up the alliances that many of the southern Lombard states had made with the Saracens, the family's interests were generally hostile to the papacy, a policy that Guy initially followed.

With Lambert's death in 880, he bequeathed to Guy the march of Camerino, and in 882 Guy supported his nephew Guy II of Spoleto's invasion of the Papal States. This brought him into conflict with the Emperor Charles the Fat, and in 882, at an assembly at Verona, the emperor dispossessed him of his fiefs, together with a significant number of other important, but minor, Italian nobles. Rising up in rebellion, Guy allied himself with the neighbouring Saracens and began acquiring further territory. At this point, at a diet at Ravenna, the emperor declared him guilty of high treason, and Berengar of Friuli was commanded to strip him of his fief by force.

In 883, Guy inherited his nephew's title of Spoleto and reunited the dukedom, henceforth as the "Duchy of Spoleto and Camerino" bearing the title of dux et marchio (and gaining his regnal number III), and by the end of 884, Emperor Charles III was forced to make peace with Guy, where he formally recovered his titles. Then in 885, he fought his occasional allies, the Saracens of the Garigliano.

== King and emperor ==
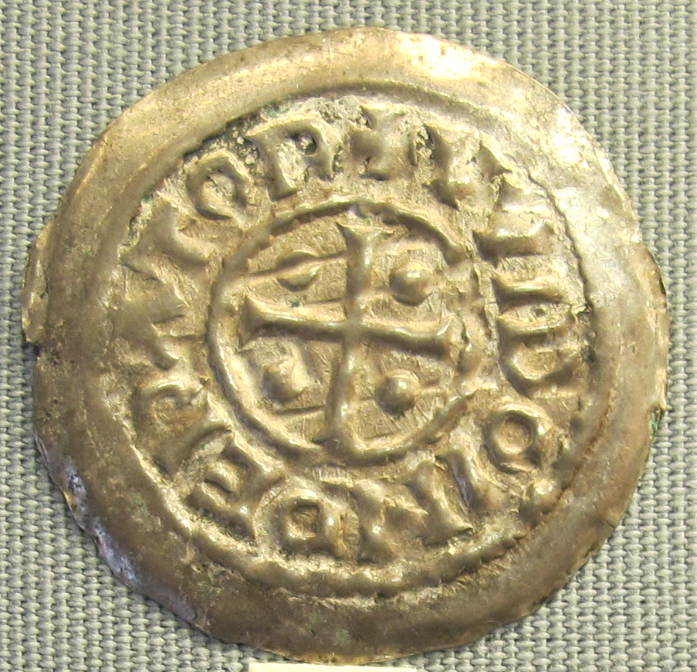
A Spoletan denarius from the reign of Guy III

After the deposition of emperor Charles in late 887, by virtue of being a relative of Archbishop Fulk of Rheims, Guy tried to gain the West Frankish Realm, but already in February 888 his main rival, count Odo, was crowned king of the West Franks in Compiègne. Thus in March 889, Guy tried to establish rule over Lotharingia, and was crowned king in Langres, hoping to gain support in southern Lotharingian and northern Burgundian regions. Having won the support of some Burgundian nobles such as Anscar of Oscheret, he soon left for Italy in order to claim the Italian royal crown.

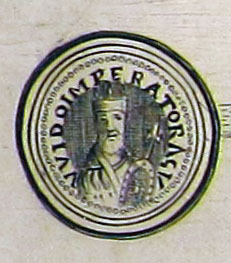
Seal of king Guy on a paper from his coronation, Pavia, 889 AD

Guy of Spoleto was opposed by Berengar of Friuli for the Iron Crown of Lombardy. Although Berengar had the advantage of being allied with the Carolingian family, and of having been crowned as king of Italy in 887, from 888 Guy was closer to Rome, and had already allied himself with Pope Stephen V, who had described Guy “as his only son”. Fighting between the rival contenders began, and it was Guy who had himself proclaimed king of Italy in a diet held at Pavia at the end of the year 888. He was formally crowned King of Italy by Pope Stephen V in 889 in Pavia, in the Basilica of San Michele Maggiore, and this was followed by his coronation as Roman Emperor on 21 February 891, together with the crowning of his son Lambert II as King of Italy.

The situation in Italy began to deteriorate with the election of a new pope, Formosus, in 891. Distrustful of Guy, he began to look elsewhere for support against the emperor, as Guy found it increasingly difficult to end the threat of Berengar who still held out in his Duchy of Friuli. To bolster his overall position, at Ravenna on 30 April 892, Guy forced Pope Formosus to crown Lambert as co-emperor.

The pope therefore took the next opportunity to oppose Guy by supporting Arnulf of Carinthia for the Italian and imperial titles. In 893, Formosus invited Arnulf to come to Trento to overthrow Guy and be crowned himself. Arnulf instead sent his son Zwentibold with an army to join Berengar, the deposed king, and march on Trento. Their joint army surrounded Trento, but Guy probably bribed them to leave him unmolested. The following year, they defeated Guy at Bergamo and took Trento and Milan. Berengar was recognised as king and a vassal of Arnulf. Zwentibold returned to Germany, as fever had wreaked havoc on the German armies. Guy retreated in order to regroup at a fortified place on the Taro and died there suddenly in late autumn, leaving his son under the tutelage of his wife. Both would contest the throne with Berengar and Arnulf.

== Attempt to seize the throne of Western Francia ==
Following the death of Emperor Charles III the Fat in January 888, he was elected King of West Francia in February 888 at Langres, in opposition to Odo, Count of Paris. He was supported at the time by the counts of Vermandois and Flanders, as well as the bishops of Reims, Langres, and Senlis. However, Odo's victory over the Normans on June 24, 888, at Montfaucon-en-Argonne which led to his recognition by the Carolingian King of East Francia, Arnulf of Carinthia, and a second coronation at Reims in November 888 cemented the legitimacy of the Robertian ruler and dashed Guy's hopes for the French throne; consequently, he turned his attention to Italy.

== Legacy ==
At the time of his return to Italy, Guy had introduced himself as an adventurer, accompanied by fortune-seekers. His actions in regards to the nobility and clergy sought to legitimise his brisk rise to power, to the point that his motto, Renovatio Regni Francorum, inspired even higher ambitions than the ones he had already achieved.

Guy's power never extended over much beyond his hereditary lands, which offered a stark illustration of the fact that the imperial title, with its pretensions of universal rule, had by the end of the ninth century become merely a token of the pope's favour, to be fought over by various Italian nobles. He did not even firmly control the north of Italy, battling other claimants over the throne for much of his reign. He did try to maintain the Carolingian tradition and issue capitularies as former emperors had. In 891, he demanded the traditional service in the army of all arimanni, whether they owned land or not.

== See also ==
- History of Italy
- Medieval Italy
- Carolingian Italy

== Sources ==
- MacLean, Simon (2013). "Shadow Kingdom: Lotharingia and the Frankish World, c. 850–c. 1050". History Compass. 11 (6): 443–457.
- McKitterick, Rosamond (1983). The Frankish Kingdoms Under the Carolingians, 751-987. Harlow: Longman.
- Reuter, Timothy (2013) [1991]. Germany in the Early Middle Ages c. 800–1056. London and New York: Routledge.
- Reuter, Timothy, ed. (1992). The Annals of Fulda. Manchester: Manchester University Press.
- Riché, Pierre (1993). The Carolingians: A Family Who Forged Europe. Philadelphia: University of Pennsylvania Press. ISBN 0-8122-1342-4.
- Schneider, Jens (2010). Auf der Suche nach dem verlorenen Reich: Lotharingien im 9. und 10. Jahrhundert. Köln: Böhlau Verlag.
- Wickham, Chris (1981). Early Medieval Italy: Central Power and Local Society, 400-1000. Totowa, NJ: Barnes & Noble.
- De Manteyer, Georges. Les origines de la maison de Savoie en Bourgogne (910-1060). Mélanges d'archéologie et d'histoire: 1899.
- di Carpegna Falconieri, Tommaso. "Guido, conte marchese di Camerino, duca marchese di Spoleto, re d'Italia, imperatore". Dizionario Biografico degli Italiani, LXI. Rome: 2004, pp. 354–361.
- Mann, Horace, K. The Lives of the Popes in the Early Middle Ages, Vol III: The Popes During the Carolingian Empire, 858–891. 1925
- Mann, Horace, K. The Lives of the Popes in the Early Middle Ages, Vol IV: The Popes in the Days of Feudal Anarchy, 891–999. 1925
- Comyn, Robert. History of the Western Empire, from its Restoration by Charlemagne to the Accession of Charles V, Vol. I. 1851

Emperor Guy House of Guideschi Died: 12 December 894
Regnal titles
Preceded by Berengar I as unopposed king	— DISPUTED — King of Italy; 889–894; Disputed by Berengar I	Succeeded by Lambert (II)
Vacant Title last held by Charles III	Holy Roman Emperor; 891–894	Succeeded by Lambert (II)
Preceded by Guy II	Duke of Spoleto; 883–894	Succeeded by Lambert (II)
Preceded by Lambert I	Margrave of Camerino; 880–894 with Guy II (880–894)	Succeeded by Lambert (II)
