= Renovatio regni Francorum =

The Latin motto Renovatio regni Francorum ("renewal of the kingdom of the Franks") was used by several monarchs of the Carolingian, Widonid and Ottonian dynasties in the 9th through 11th centuries. It served to emphasise the importance of the ethnic Franks and the Frankish tradition in the multinational empires of the Carolingians and Ottonians.

A golden bull of Charles the Bald bearing the renovatio regni Francorum motto

It may have been used as early as 813 by Charlemagne, but it was definitely used by his successor as emperor, Louis the Pious, on a metal seal during his religious reforms. It originally referred to the internal religious renewal of the Frankish empire. The motto was used only sporadically by the later Carolingians. Louis's younger son, Charles the Bald, put it on his coins early in his reign probably to appeal to the ethnically Frankish nobility of his kingdom.

After he became emperor in 875, Charles the Bald combined on his new seal his father's formula with that of his grandfather, renovatio Romanorum imperii ("renewal of the empire of the Romans"), to create a new motto: renovatio imperii Romani et Francorum. The motto renovatio regni Francorum was used again by the emperors Charles the Fat (881–888), Guy (891–894), Lambert (892–898) and Arnulf (896–899).

Between 1003 and 1007, King Henry II of Germany resurrected the motto for his own program of religious reform. He was also asserting his connection with the Carolingian past and the parity of the German kingdom with the Byzantine Empire. Henry used it from his election as king of Germany and before he had been crowned emperor in Rome. He was the first non-emperor to use the motto and by doing so clearly expressed the "imperial" nature of the German kingship. Traditionally, Henry II's adoption of this motto has been seen as a conscious break with his predecessor, Otto III, who had favoured Charlemagne's motto renovatio Romanorum imperii. The idea that this change of motto indicated an abrupt change of governing program has been questioned in recent years.

== Bibliography ==
- Althoff, Gerd (2003). Otto III. Translated by Phyllis G. Jestice. University Park, PA: Pennsylvania State University Press.
- Bernhardt, John W. (2001). "Renovatio Regni Francorum". In John M. Jeep (ed.). Medieval Germany: An Encyclopedia. New York and London: Garland. p. 470.
- Garipzanov, Ildar H. (2008). The Symbolic Language of Royal Authority in the Carolingian World (c.751–877). Leiden: Brill.
- Müller-Mertens, Eckhard (2000). "The Ottonians as Kings and Emperors". In Reuter, Timothy (ed.). The New Cambridge Medieval History, Volume 3, c.900–c.1024. Cambridge: Cambridge University Press. pp. 233–66. ISBN 978-1-13905572-7.
- Semmler, Josef (1990). "Renovatio Regni Francorum: Die Herrschaft Ludwigs des Frommen in Frankenreich 814–829/830". In Peter Godman; Roger Collins (eds.). Charlemagne's Heir: New Perspectives on the Reign of Louis the Pious (814–840). Oxford: Clarendon. pp. 125–159.
- Sot, M. Michel (2009). "Renovatio, renaissance et réforme à l'époque carolingienne: recherche sur les mots". Bulletin de la Société nationale des Antiquaires de France. 2007 (2007): 62–72. doi:10.3406/bsnaf.2009.10725.
- West-Harling, Veronica (2018). "The Roman Past in the Consciousness of the Roman Elites in the Ninth and Tenth Centuries". In Walter Pohl; Clemens Gantner; Cinzia Grifoni; Marianne Pollheimer-Mohaupt (eds.). Transformations of Romanness: Early Medieval Regions and Identities. De Gruyter. pp. 173–194. doi:10.1515/9783110598384-013. hdl:10278/3702393. ISBN 9783110598384.
- Zimmermann, Harald (1974). "Imperatores Italiae" (PDF). In Helmut Beumann (ed.). Historische Forschungen für Walter Schlesinger. Cologne: Böhlau. pp. 379–399.
