= Yves Chevallard =

French academic and mathematician (1946–2026)

- Born: 1 May 1946; Tunis, French protectorate of Tunisia
- Died: 16 March 2026 (aged 79); Marseille, France
- Education: École normale supérieure
- Occupations: Academic, mathematician

Yves Chevallard (French: [ˈiv ʃəvalˈaʁ]; 1 May 1946 – 16 March 2026) was a French academic and mathematician.

== Life and career ==
Born in Tunis on 1 May 1946, Chevallard studied at the Lycée Thiers and the École normale supérieure, where he earned an agrégation de mathématiques. He became a professor of mathematics at Aix-Marseille University, where he developed a specialization in the didactic method. He received inspiration from sociologist Michel Verret and wrote several texts on the didactic method.

Chevallard died in Marseille on 16 March 2026, at the age of 79.

== Distinctions ==
- Hans Freudenthal Award (2009)
- Honorary doctorate from the University of Liège (2010)
- Honorary doctorate from the National University of Córdoba (2013)
- Honorary doctorare from the University of Santiago, Chile (2020)

== Publications ==
- "Le passage de l'arithmétique à l'algébrique dans l'enseignement des mathématiques au collège : Première partie : l'évolution de la transposition didactique" (1985)
- La Transposition didactique : Du savoir savant au savoir enseigné (1991)
- "Autour de l'enseignement de la géométrie" (1991)
- "Ostensifs et non-ostensifs dans l’activité mathématique (3 février 1994)" (1994)
- Estudiar matemáticas. El eslabón perdido entre la enseñanza y el aprendizaje (1998)
- "Organiser l’étude. 1. Structures & fonctions" (2002)
- "Organiser l’étude : 3. Écologie & régulation" (2002)
- "Organisation et techniques de formation des enseignants de mathématiques" (2006)
