= Guy of Nantes =

Guy, also called Guido, (died before 819) was appointed to replace the late Roland as Warden of the Breton March after his death at the Battle of Roncesvalles in 778. Guy no more effectively exercised control over Brittany than his predecessor, but was the chief contact by which the Bretons knew French policy. His actual territory of control was the County of Nantes. Carolingian infighting distracted Guy and prevented him from exhibiting any real authority. It was to be Norman pressure on the Bretons which would open a portal to a French dynasty in Brittany under Berengar of Rennes.

Guy was the son of Lambert and Teutberga of the Austrasian family of the Widonids. Guy received his charge in Neustria and Nantes about 799, at the same time that his brother Frodoald received the county of Vannes. Royal annals note in the year 799 that "Guy, prefect of the marches of Brittany, who in the same year traversed the whole province with the counts his colleagues, came to present [to Charlemagne] at Aachen, the arms of the Breton chiefs who had been rendered to him, and on each trophy was inscribed the name of the chief to whom the weapon belonged." It was specified at the same time that "Brittany appeared then to be entirely subject."

Guy's name subsequently appears, notably in 814, in the many acts recorded in the cartulary of the abbey of Saint-Sauveur de Redon, where it is found beside that of Jarnhitin, machtiern or princeps plebis (prince of the people). The cartulary says "Jarnhitin rules, Guy is count."

Guy died before 819, leaving his son Lambert as count of Nantes and prefect of the march.
