= Lambert I of Nantes =

French noble

Lambert I
- Count of Nantes
- Reign: 818–831
- Predecessor: Guy
- Successor: Ricwin
- Died: 836
- Noble family: Widonids
- Spouses: Itta; Adelaide of Lombardy
- Issue: Lambert II; Guy I

Lambert I (died 836) was the Count of Nantes and Prefect of the Breton March between 818 and 831 and Duke of Spoleto between 834 and 836. Lambert succeeded his father Guy.

Lambert participated in an expedition undertaken by Louis the Pious in 818 against the Bretons, who had proclaimed Morvan Lez-Breizh their king. In 822, a new Breton chief Wiomarc'h rebelled, but submitted in May 825 at Aachen. On his return to Brittany, Lambert had him assassinated.

In 831, Lambert joined the rebellion of Lothair I against Louis and was exiled across the Alps, where he was given the Duchy of Spoleto in 834. He was one of many among Lothair's entourage to die in an epidemic of 836.

Lambert married firstly Itta, who bore his eventual successor in Nantes, Lambert II. Subsequently, he married Adelaide of Lombardy, the eldest daughter of Pepin of Italy, who was in turn the eldest son of Charlemagne that had children. Adelaide bore him another son, Guy, who would succeed him in the duchy of Spoleto. Guy's son Guy III of Spoleto was crowned emperor.

Titles of nobility
Preceded by Guy	Count of Nantes; 818–831	Succeeded by Ricwin
Preceded by Adelchis I	Duke of Spoleto; 834–836	Succeeded by Berengar
