= Berengar of Spoleto =

Berengar (Latin: Berengarius) was duke of Spoleto by 836. His rule is recorded in the catalogues of Farfa Abbey and in texts dated during the reign of Emperor Lothar I.

== Beginning of the dukedom ==
The catalogues of Farfa record Berengar with the title of duke in the year 836, indiction 14.

An act recording the offering made by a man named Maximus to Sicard, abbot of Farfa, concerns the offering of Maximus's son Gualeperto in the church of Saint Martin and dates the event to July 837 in the second year of Duke Berengar and in indiction 15. The dating confirms that the first year of Berengar's dukedom corresponded to 836 and that the second year of his dukedom corresponded to 837.

== Chronology ==
Ludovico Antonio Muratori reported, from materials transmitted by Valesius from the archive of Casauria, another text dated by Valesius to the year 844 and by Muratori to the year 843. Its dating places the event in the 22nd year of the rule of Emperor Lothar, in the sixth year of Berengar's dukedom, in September, and in indiction 7. Indiction 7 began on 1 September 843.

If the first year of Berengar's dukedom was 836 and the second year 837, the sixth year of his dukedom corresponds to 841. The combination of the sixth year of Berengar's dukedom with indiction 7 therefore conflicts chronologically, because indiction 7 corresponds to September 843.

Muratori recognized this chronological difficulty and noted that in the year 843 the duke of Spoleto was Guy I. He therefore proposed that Berengar might instead have been duke of Camerino, but evidence connected with land in the Sabina identifies Berengar as duke of Spoleto and not as duke of Camerino.

Berengar ruled for approximately seven years in total. By September 843 the duchy had already passed to other hands, as attested by Erchempert.

== Figure preceding Berengar ==
A Farfa catalogue records a man named Crescentius with the title of count before the entry for Duke Berengar, without specifying the place where Crescentius held that office.

No count named Crescentius appears in the surviving Farfa materials, but the catalogue lists earlier figures such as Eserotone and Gerardo simply with the title of count even though other materials identify them as dukes of Camerino, and the same possibility has been considered for Crescentius.

Italian nobility
Preceded by Lambert I	Duke of Spoleto; 836–843	Succeeded by Guy I
