= Mathetics =

Science of learning

Mathetics is the science of learning. The term was coined by John Amos Comenius (1592–1670) in his work Spicilegium didacticum, published in 1680. He understood Mathetics as the opposite of Didactics, the science of teaching. Mathetics considers and uses findings of current interest from pedagogical psychology, neurophysiology and information technology.

== The Journal of Mathetics ==
In 1962, The University of Alabama's Mathetics Foundation began publication of The Journal of Mathetics. However, only two issues were ever printed, the first in January and the second in April.

The contents of the first issue included:

- p. 7 THE TECHNOLOGY OF EDUCATION – domain theory, operant span, long division
- p. 75 EFFECTING THE USE OF EFFICIENT STUDY HABITS – SQ3R, stimulus control, graph paper
- p. 87 THE CONTROL OF EATING – obese, disposition to eat, weight loss
- p. 111 THE PROGRESS PLOTTER As A REINFORCEMENT DEVICE – reading rate, mathetical, delayed auditory feedback

== Mathetics in literature ==
Seymour Papert, MIT mathematician, educator, and author, explains the rationale behind the term mathetics in Chapter 5 (A Word for Learning) of his book, The Children's Machine. The origin of the word, according to Papert, is not from "mathematics," but from the Greek, mathēmatikos, which means "disposed to learn." He feels this word (or one like it) should become as much part of the vocabulary about education as is the word pedagogy or instructional design.

In Chapter 6 of The Children's Machine, Papert mentions six case studies, and all six have their own accompanying learning moral and they all continue his discussion of his views of mathetics. Case study 2 looks at people who use mathematics to change and alter their recipes while cooking. His emphasis here is the use of mathematical knowledge without formal instruction, which he considers to be the central mathetic moral of the study. Papert states "The central epistemological moral is that we all used concrete forms of reasoning. The central mathetic moral is that in doing this we demonstrated we had learned to do something mathematical without instruction – and even despite having been taught to proceed differently" (p. 115).

Papert's 1980 book, Mindstorms: Children, Computers, and Powerful Ideas, discusses the mathetic approach to learning. By using a mathetic approach, Papert feels that independent learning and creative thinking are being encouraged. The mathetic approach can be summarized as "learning by doing." Many proponents of the mathetic approach feel that the best, and maybe the only, way to learn is by self-discovery.

An alternative definition of the term "mathetic" is 'to refer to' or 'as done with reference' and would suggest that mathematics is a notational language that refers to other objects or subjects in the world or universe and as such provides an accurate ontology.
