= Lambert I of Spoleto =

Duke of Spoleto from 859 to 871 and 876 to 880

Lambert I

Duke of Spoleto
- Reign: 859 - 871 (First); Successor: Suppo II; 876 - 880 (Second); Successor: Guy II
- Predecessor: Guy I
- Died: c. 880
- Spouses: Judith, daughter of Eberhard of Friuli
- Issue: Guy II of Spoleto
- Father: Guy I of Spoleto
- Mother: Itta

Lambert I (died 880) was the duke and margrave (dux et marchio) of Spoleto on two occasions, first from 859 to 871 and then from 876 to his death. Lambert was the eldest son of Guy I of Spoleto and Itta, daughter of Sico of Benevento. He married Judith, daughter of Eberhard of Friuli.

== Rule ==
In his first year of rule, he joined Gerard, count of the Marsi; Maielpoto, gastald of Telese; and Wandelbert, gastald of Boiano, to prevent Sawdan, the Saracen emir of Bari, from reentering his city after a campaign against Capua and the Lavorno. Despite a bloody battle, he successfully entered Bari.

In April 860, Lambert joined with Hildebert, count of Camerino, in rebelling against the Emperor Louis II. Chased by an imperial army into the Marsi, from there they fled to Benevento and took refuge under Prince Adelchis. Louis surrounded the city and pardoned both Lambert and his protector in return for their loyalty. Hildebert, however, fled further to Bari.

In 866, Louis unsuccessfully besieged Landulf II, the count-bishop of Capua. He even granted Lambert the county of Capua to continue the siege. At that moment, the duchy of Spoleto had reached its greatest extent.

Lambert left the siege of Capua and went to Rome after the election of Adrian II on 13 November 867. On 13 December, Lambert plundered Rome during the papal coronation ceremony. He was promptly excommunicated and, as the emperor supported Adrian's pontificate, lost the patronage of Louis. It was three years before he rebelled a second time, though. In 871, after the emperor greatly increased his power and prestige by capturing Bari, Lambert allied with Guaifer of Salerno, Sergius II of Naples, and Adelchis of Benevento and entered into open revolt against the emperor. The Saracens, however, landed new forces and attacked Salerno. Adelchis, who had imprisoned the emperor while Lambert was staying in Benevento, released his captive to lead the forces against the infidels. The newly freed emperor immediately deposed Lambert from his imperial position and replaced him with Suppo III, a cousin of his wife Engelberga.

Louis returned to the Mezzogiorno in 873, the pope having absolved him from the oaths he had sworn to Adelchis in return for liberty. He besieged Benevento, but failed to take Lambert. After his death, he was succeeded as emperor by his uncle Charles the Bald, who reappointed Lambert to his old post in Spoleto (February or June 876). He also appointed Lambert's younger brother Guy as margrave of Camerino with the job of protecting the pope. On 16 July, at Ponthion, Charles confirmed the donation of a large part of Spoletan territory to the papacy, but Lambert was still the most powerful lord in the central peninsula and a practically independent prince.

In 877, Charles died and Lambert supported Carloman of Bavaria over Charles' heir, Louis the Stammerer, for the kingship of Italy and the emperorship. Lambert himself entered Rome with the intent of making himself king, but was dissuaded by Pope John VIII. In March 878, Lambert and Adalbert I of Tuscany forced the populace to acknowledge Carloman as king. The two then besieged the pope in the Leonine City for thirty days and John fled Rome for Troyes. At Troyes, he held a synod in which he offered to crown Louis the Stammerer emperor, adopted Boso of Arles as his son, and excommunicated his Italian enemies (Lambert and Adalbert). The pope even accused Lambert of desiring the imperial crown for himself, which is probable considering the subsequent history of his dynasty.

Lambert returned his sights to Capua after this Roman episode. He died besieging that city in 880. He was succeeded by his son Guy II. His brother Guy became king and emperor, as did his nephew and namesake Lambert II. The Archbishop of Rheims Fulk the Venerable, cautioned Lambert II against following his eponymous uncle's example.

== Sources ==
- Caravale, Mario (ed). Dizionario Biografico degli Italiani: LXIII Labroca – Laterza. Rome, 2004.

Italian nobility
Preceded by Guy I	Duke of Spoleto; 859–871	Succeeded by Suppo II
Preceded by Suppo II	Duke of Spoleto; 876–880	Succeeded by Guy II
