= Renovatio imperii Romanorum =

Intention to restore the Roman Empire

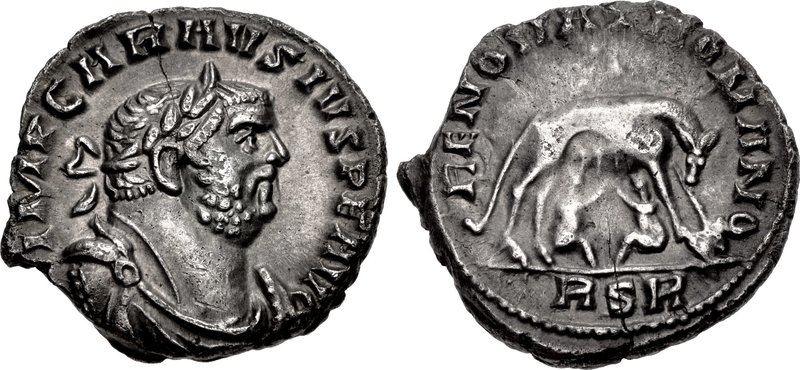
Denarius of the Roman usurper Carausius, depicting on the reverse (at right) Romulus and Remus surrounded by the legend RENOVAT[io] ROMANO[rum], "renewal of the Romans".

Renovatio imperii Romanorum ("renewal of the empire of the Romans") is a Latin formula declaring an intention to restore or revive the Roman Empire. The formula (and variations) was used by several emperors of the Carolingian and Ottonian dynasties, but the idea was common during Late Antiquity and the Middle Ages.

== Late Antiquity ==
The phrases renovatio Romanorum ("renewal of the Romans") and renovatio urbis Romae ("renewal of the city of Rome") had been used already during Antiquity. The word renovatio ("renewal") and its relatives, restitutio ("restitution") and reparatio ("restoration"), appeared on some Roman coins from the reign of Hadrian onward, usually signifying the restoration of peace after a rebellion. The formula seems favoured especially by usurpers, such as Carausius, Magnentius and Decentius.

Even Theoderic the Great, the king of the Ostrogoths in Italy (r. 493–526), made use of the language of Roman renewal. The records of his reign in the writings of Cassiodorus, Ennodius and the Anonymus Valesianus are replete with reference to renewing, repairing and rejuvenating.

During the reign of Emperor Justinian I (r. 527–565), renewal was associated with the restoration of the empire's frontiers by reconquest. This policy appealed to the Roman aristocracy and to such writers as Procopius and John Lydus, who wrote in his De magistratibus: "To Rome Justinian restored what was Rome's". This was not enough for the poet Corippus, who considered the end of Justinian's reign as a period of reckless spending and neglect. His poem In Laudem Iustini Augusti Minoris has as its theme the renewal of the empire by Justin II.

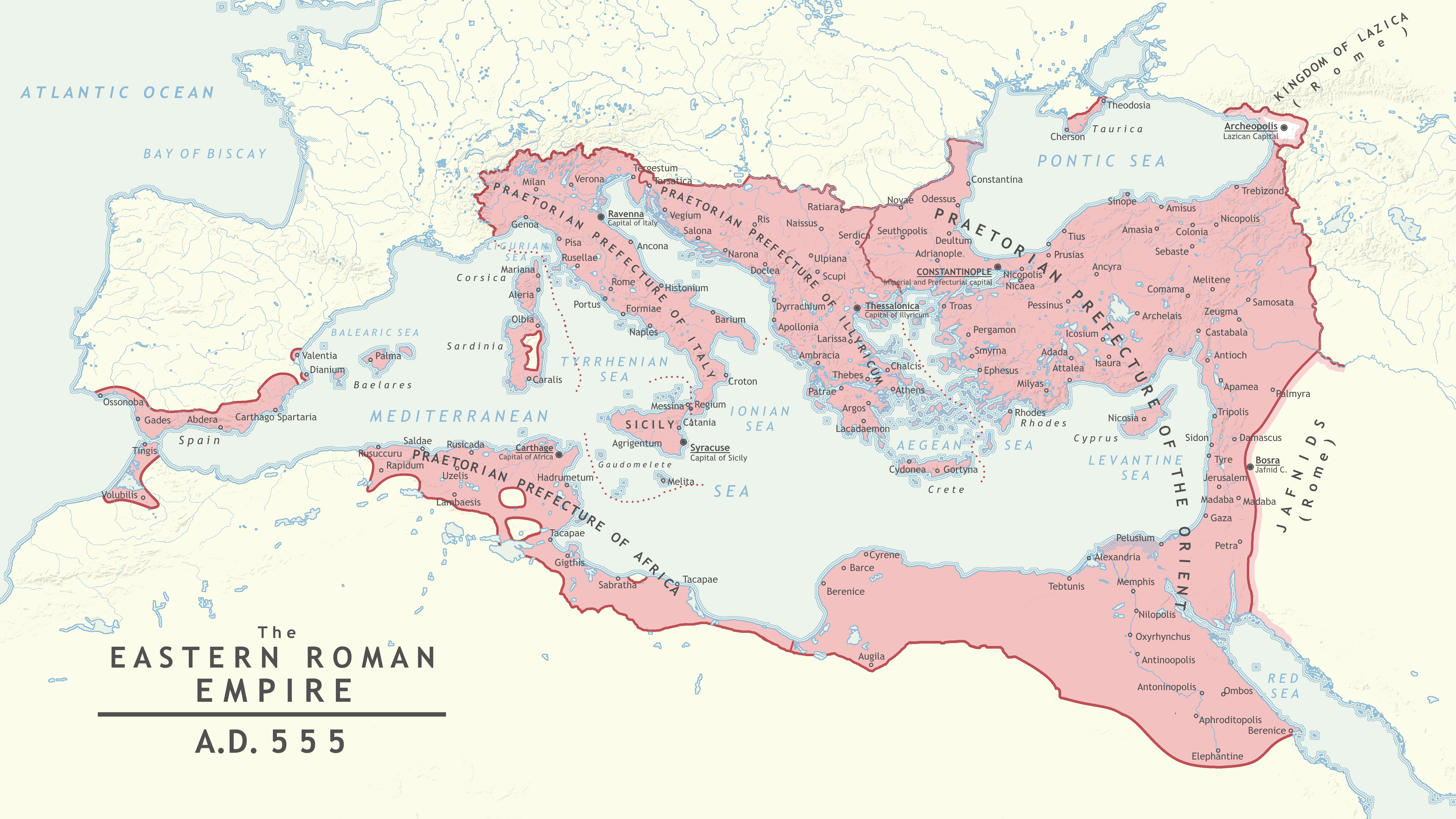
Byzantine Empire in 555 after Justinian's reconquests

== Middle Ages ==
The form renovatio Romanorum imperii was used first in a diploma issued by Charlemagne, who was crowned emperor in 800. He was probably inspired, at least partly, by Roman coins. Evidence for the "renewal" of the city of Rome by Charlemagne comes largely from the Liber pontificalis. There were major building and renovation programmes by Popes Hadrian I and Leo III, and there is also evidence for population growth and an increase of Christian pilgrimage. Charlemagne's successor, Louis the Pious, omitted the formula in favour of a new one: renovatio regni Francorum ("renewal of the kingdom of the Franks"). When Louis's younger son, Charles the Bald, became emperor in 875 he adopted the combined formula renovatio imperii Romani et Francorum for his seal.

The formula renovatio imperii Romanorum reappears on a lead seal of the Emperor Otto III in August 998. This seal was replaced in January 1001 by one bearing the legend aurea Roma ("golden Rome"). Otto III also built a palace in Rome, which none of his predecessors had done. Otto III's use of the formula has been assigned great weight in light of his enigmatic career and politics. The historian Percy Ernst Schramm argued that the formula represented a coherent programme for the restoration of the Roman Empire on a secular and universal basis. Knut Görich has written a riposte to Schramm's thesis, arguing instead that Otto III and Pope Gregory V were attempting a renewal of the papacy only.

The idea of the renewal of Rome the city (renovatio Romae), of the empire (renovatio imperii) and of Roman virtue (renovatio morum) were related in early Italian humanist thinking. The Roman popular leader Cola di Rienzo believed that the renewal of the empire would be brought about by popular sovereignty and not the Holy Roman Emperors. Most humanists, like Dante and Petrarch, believed that the renewal of imperial authority in Italy would precede the renewal of the city and encouraged kings Henry VII and Charles IV to make the journey to Rome for imperial coronation.

== Bibliography ==
- Althoff, Gerd (2003). Otto III. Translated by Phyllis G. Jestice. University Park, PA: Pennsylvania State University Press.
- Bayley, C. C. (1942). "Petrarch, Charles IV, and the Renovatio Imperii". Speculum. 17 (3): 323–341. doi:10.2307/2853305. JSTOR 2853305. S2CID 161483821.
- Bernhardt, John W. (2001). "Renovatio Regni Francorum". In John M. Jeep (ed.). Medieval Germany: An Encyclopedia. New York and London: Garland. p. 470.
- Christie, Neil (2005). "Charlemagne and the Renewal of Rome". In Joanna Storey (ed.). Charlemagne: Empire and Society. Manchester University Press. pp. 167–182.
- Corbet, Patrick (2005) [2002]. "Renovatio imperii romanorum". In André Vauchez (ed.). Encyclopedia of the Middle Ages. James Clarke & Co. ISBN 978-0-227-67931-9.
- Flavius Cresconius Corippus (1976). Cameron, Averil (ed.). In Laudem Iustini Augusti Minoris Libri IV. The Athlone Press.
- Görich, Knut (1993). Otto III. Romanus Saxonicus et Italicus. Kaiserliche Rompolitik und sächsische Historiographie. Sigmaringen: Thorbecke.
- Ladner, Gerhart B. (1976). "On Roman Attitudes toward Barbarians in Late Antiquity". Viator. 7: 1–26. doi:10.1484/j.viator.2.301582.
- Lee, Alexander (2018). Humanism and Empire: The Imperial Ideal in Fourteenth-century Italy. Oxford University Press.
- Maas, Michael (1986). "Roman History and Christian Ideology in Justinianic Reform Legislation". Dumbarton Oaks Papers. 40 (17): 17–31. doi:10.2307/1291527. JSTOR 1291527.
- Marzocchi, Sauro (2017). "Renovatio imperii Romanorum: quando Crescentius decollatus suspensus fuit. An Analysis of the Meaning of Otto III's First Lead Bulla". Journal of Medieval History. 43 (2): 193–211. doi:10.1080/03044181.2017.1285246. S2CID 159689533.
- Moorhead, John (1992). Theoderic in Italy. Clarendon Press.
- Schramm, Percy Ernst (1929). Kaiser, Rom und Renovatio. Studien zur Geschichte des römischen Erneurungsgedankens vom Ende des karolingischen Reiches bis zum Investiturstreit. Vol. 2 vols. Berlin: Teubner.
- Warner, David A. (1998). "Ideals and Action in the reign of Otto III". Journal of Medieval History. 25: 1–18. doi:10.1016/S0304-4181(98)00016-5.
- Warner, David A. (2001). "Renovatio Imperii Romanorum". In John M. Jeep (ed.). Medieval Germany: An Encyclopedia. New York and London: Garland. pp. 469–470.
- West-Harling, Veronica (2018). "The Roman Past in the Consciousness of the Roman Elites in the Ninth and Tenth Centuries". In Walter Pohl; Clemens Gantner; Cinzia Grifoni; Marianne Pollheimer-Mohaupt (eds.). Transformations of Romanness: Early Medieval Regions and Identities. De Gruyter. pp. 173–194. doi:10.1515/9783110598384-013. hdl:10278/3702393. ISBN 9783110598384.
