= Guy I of Spoleto =

Duke of Spoleto from 842 to 860

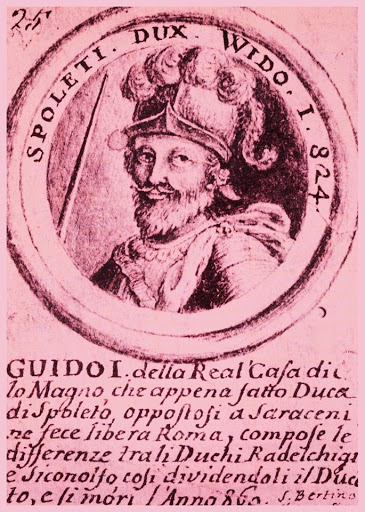
- Reign: 842-859
- Predecessor: Berengar I of Spoleto
- Successor: Lambert I of Spoleto
- Born: 816
- Died: 859
- Issue: Lambert I of Spoleto; Guy III of Spoleto
- Dynasty: Widonids
- Father: Lambert I of Nantes
- Mother: Adelaide of Lombardy
- Occupation: Duke of Spoleto

Guy I was the Duke of Spoleto from 842 to 859. He was the son of Lambert I of Nantes and Adelaide of Lombardy, the eldest daughter of Pepin of Italy.

== Early life ==
Guy travelled with his father in 834 as part of the entourage of Holy Roman Emperor Lothair I. Guy was given the abbey of Mettlach, in Lotharingia in 840, when the Emperor Louis I died.

== Family ==
Guy married Ida (Itta, Ita or Itana), daughter of Prince Sico of Benevento. Their children were Lambert I, future Holy Roman Emperor, Guy III, Conrad (A lesser son who we know little about) and a daughter named Rothilda who married Adalbert I, Margrave of Tuscany.

== Rule ==
In 843, he interfered in the Beneventan civil war on the side of his brother-in-law Siconulf. He acted as arbiter several times for high fees, but only Lothair's successor, Emperor Louis II, could end the strife. In 846, he alone succeeded in driving the Saracens out of Latium after their sack of Saint Peter's Basilica in Rome.

In 858, he supported Adhemar of Salerno against the pretended Count of Capua, Lando I. By his intervention he secured the Liri Valley, southern Lazio, with towns of Sora and Arpino taken from the count's brother Landenulf of Teano.

== Sources ==
- Goffart, Walter A. (1967). The Le Mans Forgeries: A Chapter from the History of Church Property in the Ninth Century. Harvard University Press. ISBN 9780674518759.
- Jackman, Donald C. (2008). Ius hereditarium Encountered II: Approaches to Reginlint. Editions Enlaplage.
- Kreutz, Barbara M. (1991). Before the Normans: Southern Italy in the Ninth and Tenth Centuries. University of Pennsylvania Press.

Italian nobility
| Preceded by Berengar | Duke of Spoleto; 842–860 | Succeeded by Lambert I |
