= Guy II of Spoleto =

Duke of Spoleto

Guy II (sometimes III) (died late 882 or early 883) was the eldest son and successor of Lambert I as Duke of Spoleto and Margrave of Camerino. He was elected to succeed to these titles on his father's death in 880. He had an ambitious plan of expansion to the south and to the west that conflicted with the Papacy.

He received a papal letter on 18 July on the day of his accession. Pope John VIII asked for a meeting, but Guy ignored him and instead invaded the Papal States. Pope John responded by begging the aid of Charles the Fat, already King of Italy, and crowning him Emperor on 12 February 881. Charles did little to help against Guy, however. A papal letter dated 11 November and addressed to Charles referred to Guy as Rabbia, an epithet meaning "rage." It stuck as a nickname.

As ruler, Guy used the motto Renovatio regni Francorum (renewing the kingdom of the Franks), like his Carolingian predecessors. In February 882, at a diet convoked in Ravenna by Charles, the duke, emperor, and pope made peace and Guy and his uncle, Guy of Camerino, vowed to restore stolen papal lands. In a March letter to Charles, John claimed that the vows went unfulfilled. Guy never succeeded in his dreams of expansion or in keeping his promises: he died young, later that year or early in the next. His uncle succeeded him, as his children were minors. His son Guy IV later ruled in Spoleto and the Principality of Benevento. His daughter Itta married Guaimar I of Salerno.

== Bibliography ==
- Carpegna Falconieri, Tommaso di (2004). "Guido, conte marchese di Camerino, duca marchese di Spoleto, re d'Italia, imperatore". Dizionario Biografico degli Italiani (in Italian). Vol. 61: Guglielmo Gonzaga–Jacobini. Rome: Istituto dell'Enciclopedia Italiana. ISBN 978-88-12-00032-6.
- Zimmermann, Harald (1974). "Imperatores Italiae" (PDF). In Helmut Beumann (ed.). Historische Forschungen für Walter Schlesinger. Cologne: Böhlau. pp. 379–399.

Italian nobility
Preceded by Lambert I	Duke of Spoleto; 880–883	Succeeded by Guy III
Preceded by Lambert I	Margrave of Camerino; 880–883 with Guy (880–883)	Succeeded by Guy III
