= Didactic method =

Teaching method

A didactic method (from Greek: διδάσκειν didáskein, "to teach") is a teaching method that follows a consistent scientific approach or educational style to present information to students. The didactic method of instruction is often contrasted with dialectics and the Socratic method; the term can also be used to refer to a specific didactic method, as for instance constructivist didactics.

== Overview ==
Didactics is a theory of teaching, and in a wider sense, a theory and practical application of teaching and learning. In demarcation from "mathetics" (the science of learning), didactics refers only to the science of teaching.

This theory might be contrasted with open learning, also known as experiential learning, in which people can learn by themselves, in an unstructured manner (or in an unusually structured manner) as in experiential education, on topics of interest. It can also be contrasted with autodidactic learning, in which one instructs oneself, often from existing books or curricula.

The theory of didactic learning methods focuses on the baseline knowledge students possess and seeks to improve upon and convey this information. It also refers to the foundation or starting point in a lesson plan, where the overall goal is knowledge. A teacher or educator functions in this role as an authoritative figure, but also as both a guide and a resource for students.

Didactics or the didactic method have different connotations in continental Europe and English-speaking countries. Didacticism was indeed the cultural origin of the didactic method but refers within its narrow context usually pejoratively to the use of language to a doctrinal end. The interpretation of these opposing views are theorised to be the result of a differential cultural development in the 19th century when Great Britain and its former colonies went through a renewal and increased cultural distancing from continental Europe. It was particularly the later appearance of Romanticism and Aestheticism in the Anglo-Saxon world which offered these negative and limiting views of the didactic method. On the other hand, in continental Europe those moralising aspects of didactics were removed earlier by cultural representatives of the Age of Enlightenment, such as Voltaire, Rousseau, and later specifically related to teaching by Johann Heinrich Pestalozzi.

The consequences of these cultural differences then created two main didactic traditions: The Anglo-Saxon tradition of curriculum studies on one side and the Continental and North European tradition of didactics on the other. Still today, the science of didactics carries much less weight in much of the English-speaking world..

With the advent of globalisation at the beginning of the 20th century, however, the arguments for such relative philosophical aspects in the methods of teaching started to diminish somewhat. It is therefore possible to categorise didactics and pedagogy as a general analytic theory on three levels:

- a theoretical or research level (denoting a field of study)
- a practical level (summaries of curricular activities)
- a discursive level (implying a frame of reference for professional dialogs)

== Nature of didactics and difference with pedagogy ==
The discipline of didactics is interested in both theoretical knowledge and practical activities related to teaching, learning and their conditions. It is concerned with the content of teaching (the "what"), the method of teaching (the "how") and the historical, cultural and social justifications of curricular choices (the "why"). It focuses on the individual learner, their cognitive characteristics and functioning when they learn a given content and become a knowing subject. The perspective of educational reality in didactics is drawn extensively from cognitive psychology and the theory of teaching, and sometimes from social psychology. Didactics is descriptive and diachronic ("what is" and "what was"), as opposed to pedagogy, the other discipline related to educational theorizing, which is normative or prescriptive and synchronic ("what should or ought to be") in nature. Didactics can be said to provide the descriptive foundation for pedagogy, which is more concerned with educational goal-setting and with the learner's becoming a social subject and their future role in society.

In continental Europe, as opposed to English-speaking research cultures, pedagogy and didactics are distinct areas of study. Didactics is a knowledge-based discipline concerned with the descriptive and rational study of all teaching-related activities before, during and after the teaching of content in the classroom, which includes the "planning, control and regulation of the teaching context" and its objective is to analyze how teaching leads to learning. On the other hand, pedagogy is a practice-oriented discipline concerned with the normative study of the applied aspects of teaching in real teaching contexts, i.e., inside the classroom. Pedagogy draws from didactic research and can be seen as an applied component of didactics.

=== Didactic transposition ===
In France, didactics refers to the science that takes the teaching of disciplined knowledge as its object of study. In other words, didactics is concerned with the teaching of specific disciplines to students. One of the central concepts studied in didactics of a specific discipline in France is the concept of "didactic transposition" (La transposition didactique in French). French philosopher and sociologist Michel Verret introduced this concept in 1975, which was borrowed and elaborated further in the 1980s by the French didactician of mathematics Yves Chevallard. Although Chevallard initially presented this concept regarding the didactics of mathematics, it has since been generalized for other disciplines as well.

Didactic transposition is composed of multiple steps. The first step, called the "external transposition" (transposition externe), is about how the "scholarly knowledge" (savoir savant) produced by the scholars, scientists or specialists of a certain discipline in a research context, i.e., at universities and other academic institutions is transformed into "knowledge to teach" (savoir à enseigner) by precisely selecting, rearranging and defining the knowledge which will be taught (the official curriculum for each discipline) and how it will be taught, so that it becomes an object of learning accessible to the learner. This external didactic transposition is a socio-political construction made possible by different actors working within various educational institutions: education specialists, political authorities, teachers and their associations define the issues of teaching and choose what should be taught under which form. Chevallard called this socio-political context of institutional organization the “noosphere”, which defines the limits, redefines and reorganizes the knowledge in socially, historically or culturally determined contexts.

The second step, called the "internal transposition" (transposition interne) is about how the knowledge to teach is transformed into "taught knowledge" (savoir enseigné), which is the knowledge actually taught through the day-to-day concrete practices of a teacher in a teaching context, e.g. in a classroom, and which depends on their students and the constraints imposed on them (time, exams, conformity to prevailing school rules, etc.).

In the third and final step, the taught knowledge is transformed into "acquired knowledge" (savoir acquis), which is the knowledge as it is actually acquired by students in a learning context. The acquired knowledge can be used as a feedback to the didactic system. Didactic research has to account for all the aforementioned steps of didactic transposition.

== Didactic teaching ==
Didactic method provides students with the required theoretical knowledge. It is an effective method used to teach students who are unable to organize their work and depend on the teachers for instructions. It is also used to teach basic skills of reading and writing. The teacher or the literate is the source of knowledge and the knowledge is transmitted to the students through didactic method.

=== Limitations ===
Though the didactic method has been given importance in several schools, it does not satisfy the needs and interests of all students. It can be tedious for students to listen to the possible lectures. There is minimum interaction between the students and the teachers. Learning which also involves motivating the students to develop an interest towards the subject may not be satisfied through this teaching method. It may be a monologue process and the experience of the students may not have a significant role in learning.

== See also ==
- Guy Brousseau
