= Duchy of Spoleto =

Medieval duchy in central Italy, circa 570–1201

Coordinates: 42°44′N 12°44′E

Duchy of Spoleto Ducatus Spolitanorum (Latin)
- 571–1201
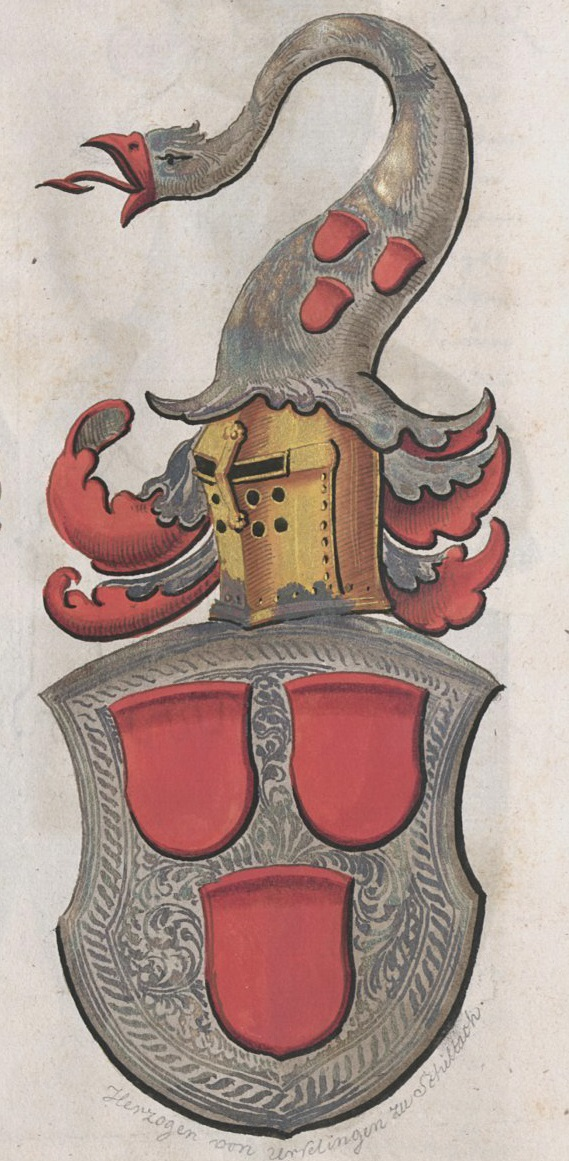
- Arms of the Dukes of Spoleto (1177 - 1201)

- The Duchy of Spoleto shown within Italy in 1000
- Status: Vassal state of the Kingdom of the Lombards (570–774); Imperial fief (776–1201)
- Capital: Spoleto
- Government: Monarchy
- Historical era: Middle Ages
  - Spoleto established by the Kingdom of the Lombards: 571
  - Charlemagne conquers the Lombards and grants the duchy to the Church: 774-776
  - Duchy resurrected as a Frankish margraviate: 842
  - Berengar diminishes the size of the Duchy: 949
  - Investiture Controversy: 1075–1122
  - Emperor Otto IV grants the duchy to the Papal States: 1201
Preceded by	Succeeded by
Kingdom of the Lombards	Papal States; Kingdom of Sicily
- Today part of: Italy

The Duchy of Spoleto (Latin: Ducatus Spolitanorum) was a duchy in central Italy that existed from the late 6th century until the early 13th century. Centered on the city of Spoleto, it controlled much of the mountainous interior of central Italy, including parts of modern Umbria, Abruzzo, Marche, and Lazio.

The duchy emerged during the Lombard conquest of Italy in the 570s, under Duke Faroald I. Owing to its position astride the Via Flaminia, Spoleto became strategically important in the struggle between the Lombards and the Byzantine Empire. Although its dukes nominally recognized the authority of the Lombard kings, the duchy often acted independently and at times concluded alliances or truces on its own.

After the Frankish conquest of the Lombard kingdom in 774, the Duchy of Spoleto passed under Carolingian suzerainty but retained a distinct political identity. During the 9th and 10th centuries its rulers played an active role in the politics of central Italy and Rome, and several dukes went on to become kings or emperors.

From the late 12th century onward the duchy was gradually absorbed into the Papal States, and by the reign of Pope Innocent III it had ceased to exist as an autonomous polity.

== History ==
=== Lombard conquest ===
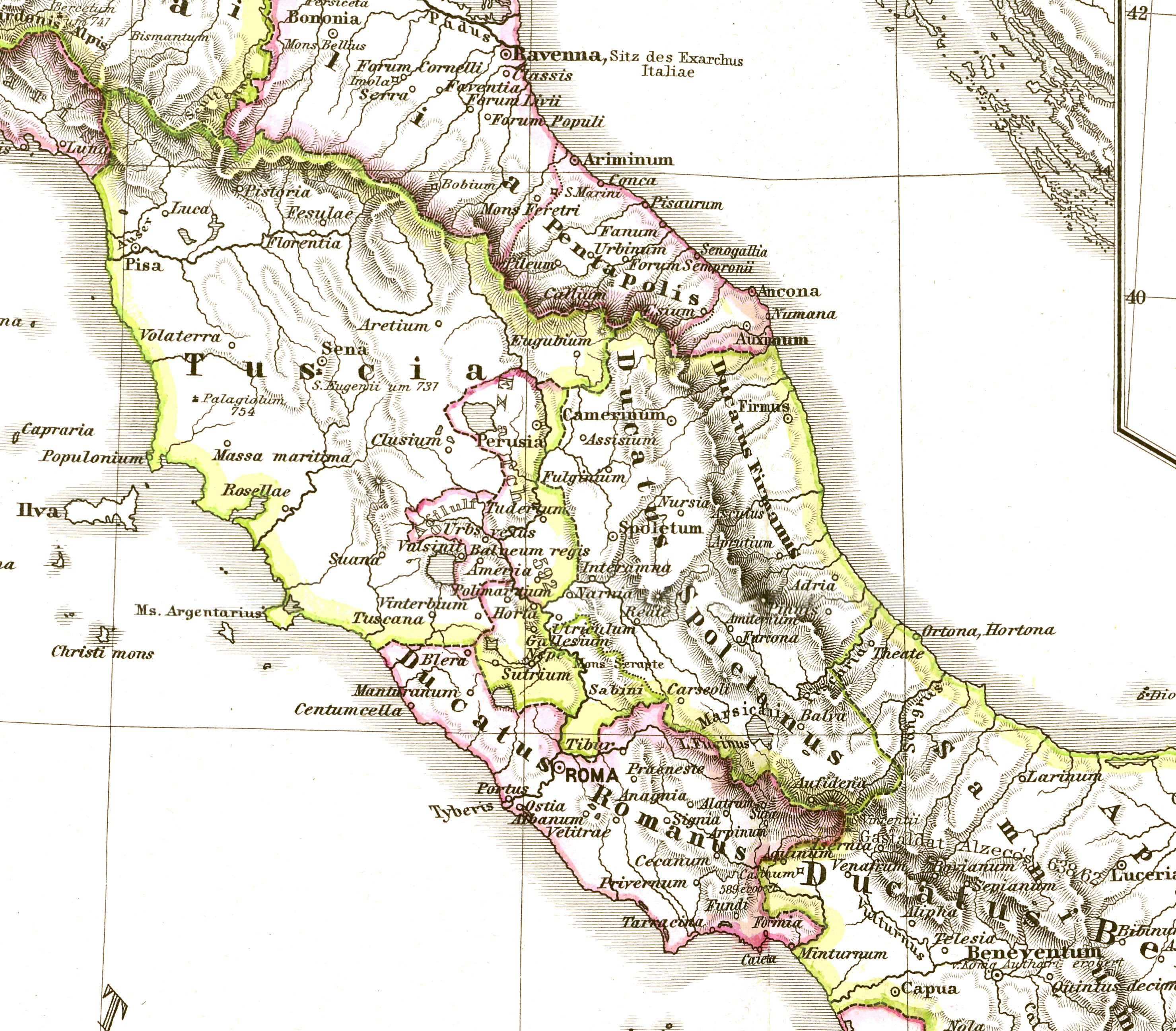
Central Italy during the Lombard era

The Duchy of Spoleto emerged during the Lombard expansion into central Italy in the late 6th century. Its origins are traditionally placed during the reign of Alboin, around 571. An alternative chronology places the foundation of the duchy after the failed Byzantine offensive of 575–576 led by Baduarius. Following this defeat Faroald I and associated Lombard groups established control, placing the foundation of the duchy a few years later.

From Spoleto, Lombard expansion advanced toward the central Apennines. The valleys of the Vigi, Nera, and Corno were progressively occupied.

The conquest divided central Italy into two main spheres: the Tuscia Romanorum, corresponding to the Byzantine-held Duchy of Perugia, and the Tuscia Longobardorum, or Duchy of Spoleto. Spoleto became a strategic center of Lombard power, as holding Spoleto meant controlling the Via Flaminia and the main routes between Rome and Ravenna, thereby cutting off the Byzantine territories from Rome.

Early Lombard settlements were established mainly on hilltops and had a very rudimentary character, encampments protected by palisades and wooden watchtowers. As the need arose to consolidate control over these territories, strategically important sites were occupied, including frontier fortresses, formerly Gothic or Byzantine fortified towns, valleys, and mountain passes.

Lombard society was organized around fare (from the term far-an), armed kinship groups that typically corresponded to extended family clans and formed the basic units of Lombard settlement and organization.

Initially the duchy enjoyed considerable independence from the Lombard kingdom, owing to natural barriers and intervening Byzantine territories. This autonomy is shown by the 592 agreement in which Ariulf concluded a separate truce with Pope Gregory I, apart from the Lombard king Agilulf.

Within Spoleto, the Roman capitolium dedicated to Jupiter, Juno and Minerva had already been occupied by the bishop's cathedral (the see was founded in the 4th century) which incorporated the pagan structure (now the church of San Ansano). The Lombard dukes restored the fortifications of the high rocca, whose walls had been dismantled by Totila during the Gothic War.

=== Conflict with Byzantium ===
Upon the death of Faroald I in 591, he was succeeded by Ariulf, who further expanded the duchy, seizing territories from the Byzantines in Picenum and among the Paeligni and Vestini. Some sources report that he converted to Catholicism later in life.

Ariulf made frequent expeditions against the Byzantines (in 579–592 against Ravenna and in 592 against Rome).

After Ariulf's death in 602, a succession dispute arose among the sons of Faroald I. The eldest, Theodelap, prevailed in battle and became duke. He is believed to have died around 650, though some sources place his death in 653. Theodelap is credited by the Catholic Encyclopedia with the first building of Spoleto's cathedral.

Theodelap was succeeded by Atto (or Azzo), of whom little is known except that he lived until 662.

Under the Lombard King Grimoald, the duchy's independence diminished as he appointed Transamund I, formerly count of Capua, as duke of Spoleto. He governed for about 40 years. Upon his death in 703, he was succeeded by his son Faroald II. He restored the renowned Farfa Abbey, which had been destroyed by the first duke, enriched it with donations, and later founded the monastery of Ferentillo.

In 716 Faroald II captured Classis, the port of Ravenna, according to Paul the Deacon's History of the Lombards. He was then obliged by Liutprand, King of the Lombards to restore it, a measure of the loose central control of Lombard rule that Liutprand was occupied in tightening, at least as Paul interpreted events for his Frankish patrons.

=== Dukedom of Transamund II ===
Transamund II, son of Faroald II, rebelled against him and in 724 forced him to abdicate and take monastic vows at the monastery of San Pietro in Ferentillo, where he died in 728. Some, however, believe that Faroald II abdicated voluntarily.

Transamund II allied with the Roman Church. He marched toward Rome and, at the Ponte Salario, defeated a Byzantine army advancing against Pope Gregory II. The Romans, together with the Lombards of the Duchy of Spoleto, defended the pope against Leo III the Isaurian and his iconoclast officials.

However, Leo III sought an alliance with King Liutprand, who distrusted the dukes of Benevento and Spoleto, considering them insufficiently loyal and intending to replace them with his own relatives. Seeing himself unable to resist the combined forces of Liutprand and Leo III, Transamund submitted entirely to his king in 729, swore loyalty, and gave hostages, thereby retaining the duchy.

Soon after, whether due to rebellion or refusal to wage war against the Duchy of Rome, Liutprand marched on Spoleto with a powerful army, intending to replace Transamund with his nephew, Agiprand. Transamund fled to Rome, where he was received favorably. Enraged, Liutprand demanded his surrender; when the Romans refused, he laid siege to Rome, plundered the Basilica of Saint Peter, and occupied several cities, including Amelia and Orte, before returning to Pavia in August 739.

Meanwhile, Hilderic had taken control of Spoleto. With the help of Roman forces and Godescalc of Benevento, Transamund invaded the duchy in 740, killed Hilderic, and reclaimed power. However, he soon alienated the pope and the Romans by failing to return four cities previously occupied by the Lombards, as he had promised.

Liutprand then swore vengeance against both Transamund and the Romans. Fearing destruction, the Romans made terms with the Lombard king. Transamund was forced to submit and soon after entered monastic life in 740. Liutprand then granted the duchy to Agiprand.

At this time, it appears that both nobles and commoners participated in choosing their duke. Agiprand was succeeded by Lupus, from whom King Aistulf later removed the duchy, governing it directly through appointed officials. Lupus was followed by Unulf in 753.

=== Campaigns of Desiderius ===
During the internal unrest among the Lombards following the succession of King Aistulf, the nobles of Spoleto, in early 757, elected Alboin as their duke. Together with Liutprand of Benevento, they submitted to Pope Stephen II under the protection of Pepin, defender of the Church.

This political shift proved costly. Desiderius, elected king with the support of the pope and Pepin, invaded the duchies of Benevento and Spoleto between 757 and 758, plundering and devastating them. The dukes Alboin and Liutprand were defeated in battle. Liutprand was succeeded in Benevento by Arechis II, while Alboin, wounded, was taken prisoner to Pavia along with leading nobles of Spoleto. The duchy remained vacant for two years.

In 759, while Desiderius was campaigning in the Roman Campagna, both Spoleto and Benevento revolted. Desiderius responded by marching against Benevento, devastating its territory and imposing heavy tributes. He then advanced into Umbria, ravaging Perugia, Assisi, and Foligno, and plundering the rest of the Duchy of Spoleto.

A new duke, Gisulf, was elected around 759 or 760. Three years later, Theodicius became duke. He, together with the Duke of Tuscany, supported the Roman clergy in deposing the antipope Constantine in 767, after which Pope Stephen III was canonically elected. He was succeeded in 772 by Adrian I. At the end of 773 the pope appointed Hildeprand as duke of Spoleto, and he acknowledged his dependence on the papacy.

Desiderius did not remain at peace with the new pope, who pressed him to honor prior agreements. In response, Desiderius gathered a formidable army and incited the Lombards of Tuscany and Spoleto to take up arms against the Church, advancing as far as Otricoli. Adrian I sent envoys to Pavia to negotiate peace, but Desiderius refused all appeals. The pope then called upon Charlemagne for military support.

According to historian Giancolombino Fatteschi, when news spread of the approaching Frankish army, a large number of Lombards from Spoleto went to Rome and swore loyalty to Pope Adrian I.

=== Carolingian conquest ===
In 776, two years after the fall of Pavia, Spoleto fell likewise to Charlemagne and his Carolingian Empire, and he assumed the title King of the Lombards.

After defeating the Lombards, Charlemagne donated extensive territories in central Italy to Pope Adrian I. This grant included jurisdiction over major cities and the right to collect the fodrum, a levy owed by the dukes of Spoleto. Despite these donations, the Duchy formally remained under imperial dominion.

Pope Adrian I complained to Charlemagne about Duke Hildeprand, who was involved in a conspiracy organized by Hrodgaud, duke of Friuli, together with Arechis II, duke of Benevento, and Reginald, duke of Chiusi, in support of Adalgis, son of Desiderius. Hildeprand later made peace with the Frankish king by presenting gifts at Varciniaco in 779. He also assisted Grimoald III, duke of Benevento, when he was attacked by Byzantine forces, which were defeated by the Franks and Lombards.

After 788 or 789 Hildeprand is no longer mentioned, marking the end of the Lombard dukes in Spoleto and the beginning of Frankish and German rule. Charlemagne appointed Winigis, a Frank, as duke.

In 799, following attacks against Pope Leo III, Winigis went to his aid and brought him to Spoleto. In 802 he campaigned against Grimoald III of Benevento, who sought independence, but was captured and later released in 803. Winigis, together with Gerold, who is identified as his son by some accounts and associated with him in government, supported Pope Leo III against opposition from Roman elites.

In his testament Charlemagne assigned the Duchy of Spoleto to his sons, having not transferred full sovereignty to the Pope, but only the pensions, tribute, and annual payments previously owed to the Lombard royal palace.

=== Widonids ===
In 845 Guy I, a Frank, is recorded as duke; he received 70,000 scudi from Radelchis I, duke of Benevento, in return for assistance during a siege by Siconulf, prince of Salerno. Among the more outstanding of the Frankish dukes, Guy I divided the duchy between his two sons Lambert I and Guy II, who received as his share the lordship of Camerino, which was made a duchy.

In 865 Lambert I returned from Bari with spoils taken from the Saracens but was defeated at Naples. In 866 he accompanied Emperor Louis II at the siege of Capua. That same year Guy I died and Lambert I succeeded him. In 867 Lambert entered Rome following the election of Pope Adrian II and carried out acts of violence. Complaints were made to Louis II, who in 871 removed him from the duchy for further abuses. In that year Suppo II, a minister of the emperor, was appointed to govern the duchy, and his daughter Bertila married Berengar, later king of Italy and emperor.

Under Louis II, the gastaldates of the Marsi were detached from the Duchy of Spoleto and elevated into the County of Marsi.

After the death of Louis II, Lambert I was restored to power by Emperor Charles II the Bald. Suppo received other duchies in compensation. Lambert withdrew to Camerino and left Spoleto to his brother Guy II. In 877, acting against Charles II and allied with Alberic, count of Tusculum, Lambert seized Rome and imposed recognition of Carloman as imperial claimant. He and his allies were excommunicated by the pope, and Charles II declared him banished from the empire; the Council of Troyes in 878 confirmed the excommunication.

Lambert I died around 879 and was succeeded by Guy II, who reunited the dukedom. After falling out of favor with Emperor Charles III, influenced by Popes John VIII and Martin II, he was banished from the empire, but later regained imperial favor and was pardoned in 885. Guy died in 888 and, following the extinction of the male line of Charlemagne, was designated emperor by Pope Stephen V. Italy was then divided between factions supporting Berengar and Guy II; Guy’s side prevailed after Berengar was defeated at Piacenza and Verona and left Italy.

In 894 Guy IV received the Duchy of Spoleto from his father. In the same year Emperor Guy II died near the river Taro and was succeeded by Lambert II, who had already been associated with him. Lambert II died in 898, killed by count Hugh.

=== 10th-century turmoil and territorial changes ===
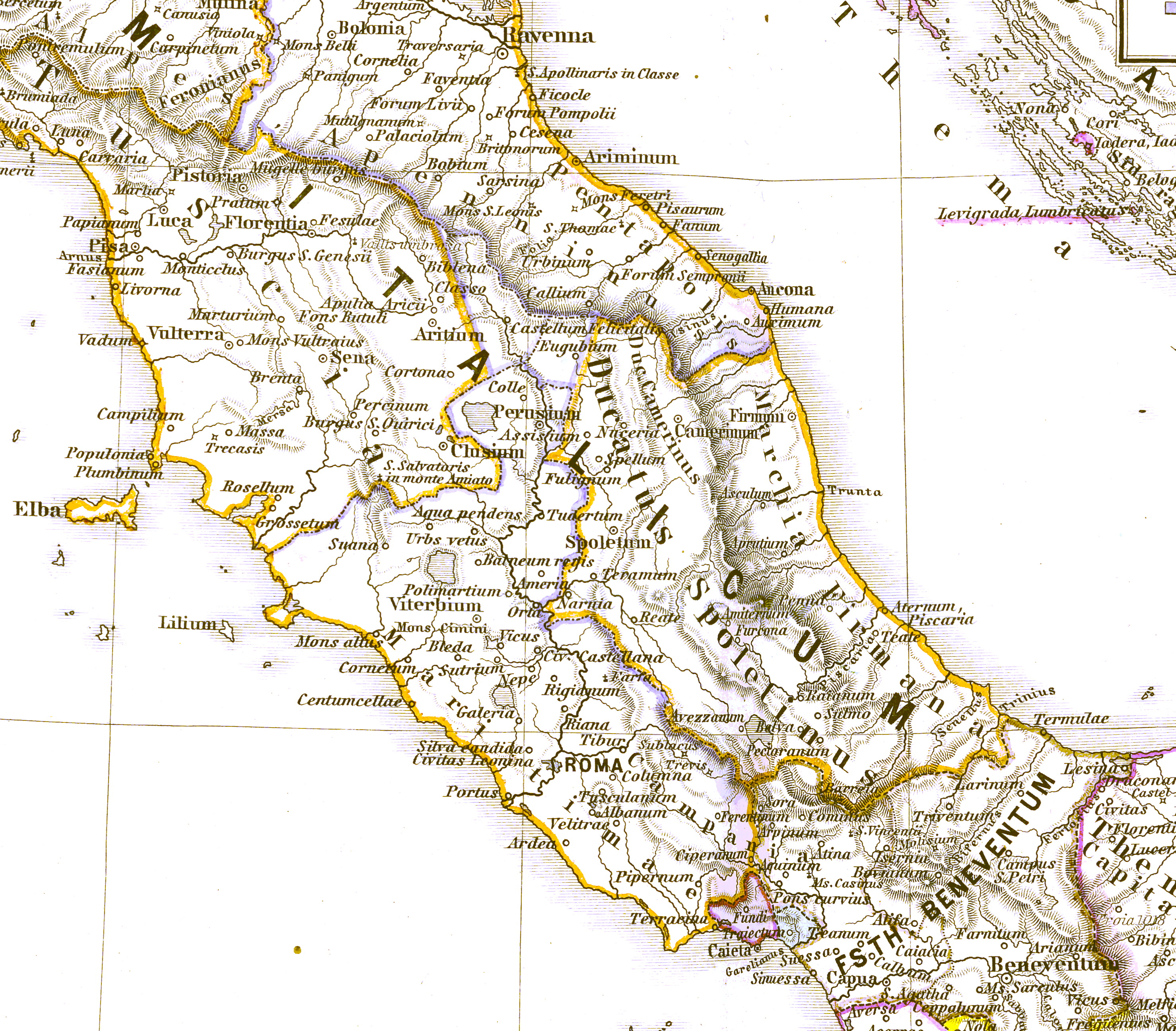
Central Italy in the early 10th century

The dukes of Spoleto continued to intervene in the violent politics of Rome. Alberic I, Duke of Camerino (897), and afterwards of Spoleto, married the notorious Roman noblewoman Marozia, mistress of Pope Sergius III (904–911), and was killed by the Romans in 924.

During the rule of Alberic I the Sabina was separated from the Duchy of Spoleto. His son Alberic II overthrew the senatrix in 932 though her son, his half-brother, was Pope John XII.

In 922 the duchy was held by Boniface I, husband of Waldrada, sister of Emperor Hugh of Provence. In 929 he was succeeded by Theobald, who supported Landulf I, duke of Benevento, and achieved a victory over Byzantine forces during a siege.

About 949, the Frankish King Berengar II of Italy took Spoleto from the margrave, diminished the size of the duchy, and set aside territory that would become the March of Fermo. At that time, Emperor Otto I detached from the Duchy of Spoleto the lands called Sabina Langobardica and presented them to the Holy See. Now the control of Spoleto became increasingly a gift of the emperors. In 967, Otto briefly united the Duchy of Spoleto with that of Principality of Capua and Benevento, which was then ruled by Pandulf Ironhead.

After Pandulf's death in 981, the joint principality of Spoleto, Capua and Benevento was partitioned amongst the sons of Pandulf, who fought endlessly to gain supremacy. Landulf IV gained Spoleto, Capua, and Benevento, while Pandulf II received Salerno. Then in 989 Otto III detached Spoleto and granted it to Hugh, Margrave of Tuscany. Later in December 998, Otto appointed Adhemar of Capua as the duke of Spoleto. Adhemar ruled four years until the duchy was united a second time with Tuscany in 1003.

Emperor Henry II transferred the remaining part of the Duchy of Spoleto to the Roman Church in exchange for other Church properties beyond the mountains. In 1056 Pope Victor II obtained the remaining possession of the duchy and the March of Fermo from the emperor. In 1057 Godfrey, duke of Lorraine, held the duchy, followed by Godfrey the Hunchback, husband of Matilda of Tuscany, who appears in documents as duchess of Spoleto and Camerino. After his death, Matilda ruled her territories, transferred them to the Church, and died in 1115.

Emperor Henry IV frequently visited the Duchy of Spoleto and held assemblies there. Dukes continued to be appointed with the support of German rulers. The first of these was Guarnerius, marquis of the March of Ancona.

=== Destruction of Spoleto ===
In 1155 the city of Spoleto underwent a devastating destruction at the hands of Emperor Frederick Barbarossa. After proceeding to Rome and being crowned by Pope Adrian IV following a solemn oath of fidelity, the emperor received tribute from the province of Ancona and many other Umbrian cities. The Duchy of Spoleto alone resisted payment of this tribute. Enraged, Frederick ordered the city to be destroyed. Spoleto was razed to its foundations. The emperor himself recounted that the city, fortified with a hundred towers, was captured by fire and sword, and left in total desolation.

In 1174 Christian, archbishop of Mainz and imperial chancellor, entered the Duchy of Spoleto with force and brought it under imperial control.

Afterward Frederick sought reconciliation with the city and appointed Conrad of Swabia, lord of Urslingen, as duke. He granted possessions to the monastery of San Pietro in Monte Martano and, in 1185, through the intercession of the duke, donated valuable relics to the cathedral of Spoleto, which were received by the citizens as pledges of restored peace.

=== Integration into the Papal States ===
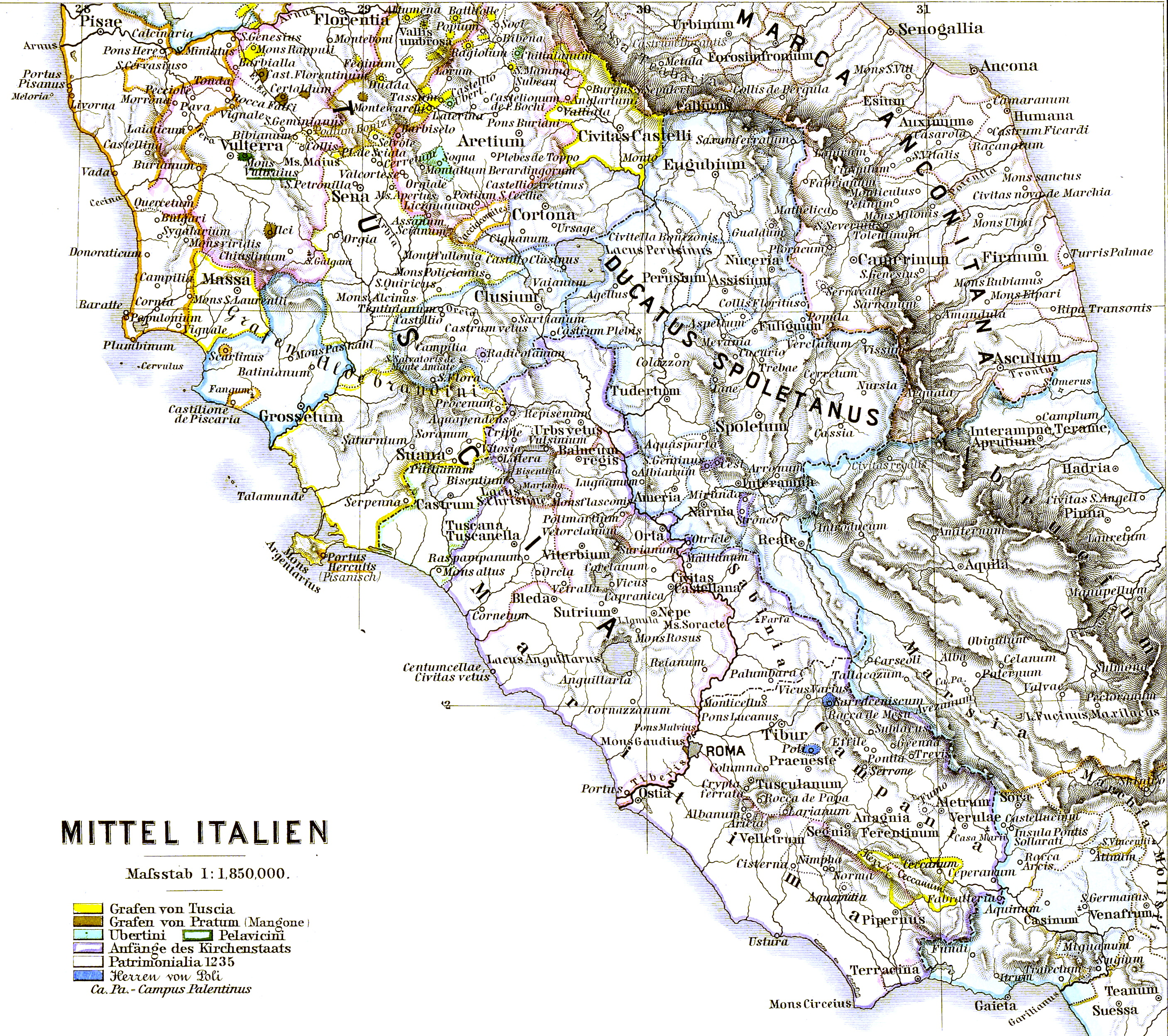
Central Italy in the 13th century

With the death of Henry VI, son of Frederick, the line of dukes came to an end. In his testament he ordered that the Duchy of Spoleto, along with other dominions, be restored to the Holy See. Pope Innocent III of the Conti family moved to reclaim these territories, expelling Conrad of Swabia. Conrad restored the duchy to avoid excommunication.

In 1198 Innocent III personally visited Spoleto. Cardinal Giovanni Colonna the Younger was appointed rector of the duchy and governed it for three years. Emperor Otto IV, claiming lands of the Church, appointed Dipold as duke of Spoleto, followed by Rainald, who continued usurpations of Church property and was imprisoned by Frederick II.

In 1223 Cardinal Raniero Capocci served as rector or legate of the March of Ancona and the Duchy of Spoleto. He faced opposition from Berthold, son of Duke Conrad, whose actions led to papal excommunication. Frederick II, hostile to the Church and in conflict with Pope Honorius III, levied troops in the duchy in 1226, but the Spoletans refused to assist. In that same year Berthold assumed the title of duke, supported by Frederick II.

Various leaders of the Ghibelline faction subsequently assumed the title of duke, while the Spoletans also applied the title by custom to papal rectors. Conrad is regarded as the last true duke of Spoleto.

From this time onward the popes governed the duchy through a rector, who delegated authority to local lieutenants. Gregory IX granted the administration of the March of Ancona and the Duchy of Spoleto for three years to Milo, bishop of Beauvais. The pope himself resided in the region on several occasions, including in 1228 and 1232 at Rieti, Spoleto, and Perugia.

The duchy continued for a long time, albeit reduced in territory, to exist as an autonomous administrative entity within the Papal States: in fact, the Constitutiones Sanctæ Matris Ecclesiæ (Constitutions of the Holy Mother Church) of Cardinal Albornoz, known as Aegidian Constitutions, of 1357 recognized the duchy as one of the five provinces of the Papal States; for example, Lucrezia Borgia, by a papal brief of August 15, 1499, was appointed governor of the Duchy of Spoleto. As a papal province, the duchy continued to exist until 1816. Generally, its governors did not have the right to bear the ducal title, but there were exceptions, among them Guidantonio da Montefeltro, Pedro Luis de Borja and Franceschetto Cybo.

== Geography ==
The Duchy of Spoleto comprised much of the mountainous interior of central Italy. Its territory included the old regions of the Sabines, the Aequi, the Vestini, southern Umbria, and the coastal land of Picenum.

To the east, the Adriatic Sea formed the boundary of the duchy. To the south it bordered the territory of Benevento, while to the north it met the Byzantine-held Pentapolis. The cities of Camerino and Fermo also appear to have belonged to Spoleto.

In the west the duchy was separated from Lombard Tuscia by the Byzantine Corridor, a narrow strip of Byzantine territory containing the cities of Polimarzo, Ameria, and Bleda; these places were only briefly attached to Spoleto in the final period of Byzantine rule. Narni likewise appears to have been incorporated for a short time. To the southwest, the duchy extended close to the gates of Rome.

== Lombard-era government ==
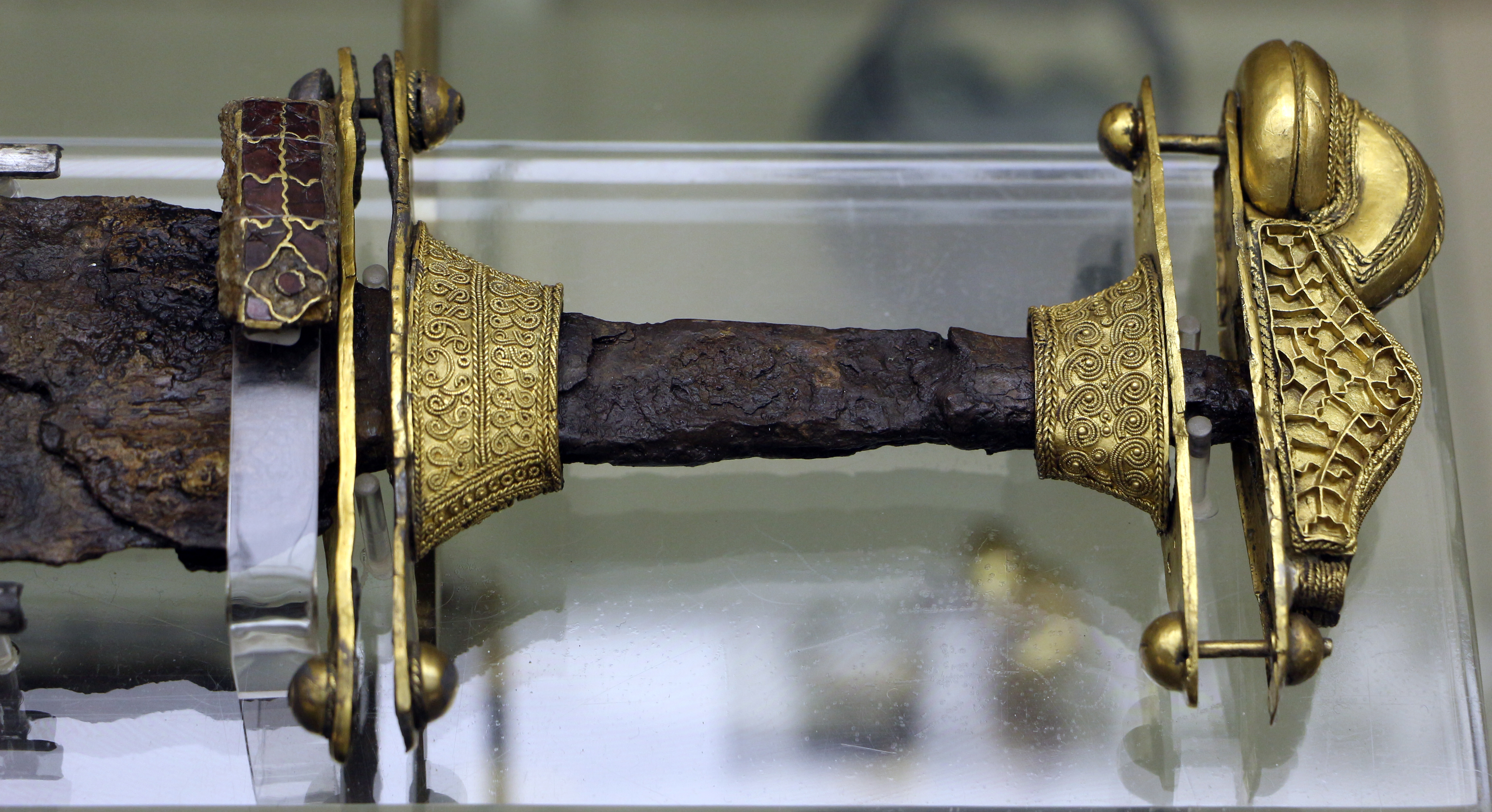
Gold-adorned Lombard sword hilt from the Nocera Umbra necropolis (570–650 AD), displayed at the Museo dell'Alto Medioevo in Rome

Within the Lombard kingdom, the Duchy of Spoleto formed part of the southern grouping of territories commonly referred to as Tuscia, which included Tuscany, Spoleto, and Benevento.

The duchy was ruled by a duke, described with the title Summus et Gloriosus Dux Langobardorum. In large duchies such as Spoleto, the duke exercised substantial authority, while acknowledging the higher sovereignty of the Lombard king.

Subordinate officials operated within the duchy. Among them were gastalds, who governed territorial districts and administered revenues connected with ducal authority. These officials exercised both civil and military functions.

At the local level, settlements were supervised by officials called sculdasci or centenarii. Each oversaw a district known as a sculdascia, and beneath them were decani, who were responsible for smaller ecclesiastical or local units. The authority of these officials combined judicial and military responsibilities, reflecting a system in which governance involved both adjudication and command.

Following the Lombard invasion of the region in 570, the former Roman structures of power were gradually replaced. The old Roman coloniae and vici turned into rural curtes, which in time were fortified and developed into castles.

=== Administrative divisions ===
The Duchy of Spoleto was divided irregularly into territorial districts known as gastaldates, named either after cities or important settlements.

Among the gastaldates within the territory of the duchy were Camerino, Septempeda, Castelpetroso (Pierosara), Fermo, Olmo, Clenti, Noce, Valle, San Giuliano, San Claudio, Sant'Elpidio, Sparziano, Ascoli, Truento (near Porto d'Ascoli), Teramo, Atri, Pinna, Furconio (Forcona), Balba, Amiternum, Narnate, Antrodoco, Rieti, Falacrine, Tora, Offiano, and Noveri.

Additional districts included the gastaldates of the Marsi and of the Cicolano (or Aequi). In the Umbrian territory west of the Apennines there were also gastaldates at Terni, Nocera, and the Tifernate district centered on Castelfelice. The city of Spoleto, seat of the duke, was itself the center of a gastaldate.

A separate district known as the Pontano gastaldate, named after the castle of Ponte on the left bank of the river Nera, included Norcia, Visso, Cascia, Triponzo, Primocaso, Paterno, and surrounding localities, extending along that side of the river as far as Otricoli.

== See also ==
- Duke of Spoleto
