= 653 =

Calendar year

653 in various calendars
- Gregorian calendar: 653; DCLIII
- Ab urbe condita: 1406
- Armenian calendar: 102; ԹՎ ՃԲ
- Assyrian calendar: 5403
- Balinese saka calendar: 574–575
- Bengali calendar: 59–60
- Berber calendar: 1603
- Buddhist calendar: 1197
- Burmese calendar: 15
- Byzantine calendar: 6161–6162
- Chinese calendar: 壬子年 (Water Rat); 3350 or 3143 — to — 癸丑年 (Water Ox); 3351 or 3144
- Coptic calendar: 369–370
- Discordian calendar: 1819
- Ethiopian calendar: 645–646
- Hebrew calendar: 4413–4414
- Hindu calendars
- Vikram Samvat: 709–710
- Shaka Samvat: 574–575
- Kali Yuga: 3753–3754
- Holocene calendar: 10653
- Iranian calendar: 31–32
- Islamic calendar: 32–33
- Japanese calendar: Hakuchi 4 (白雉４年)
- Javanese calendar: 544–545
- Julian calendar: 653; DCLIII
- Korean calendar: 2986
- Minguo calendar: 1259 before ROC 民前1259年
- Nanakshahi calendar: −815
- Seleucid era: 964/965 AG
- Thai solar calendar: 1195–1196
- Tibetan calendar: ཆུ་ཕོ་བྱི་བ་ལོ་ (male Water-Rat); 779 or 398 or −374 — to — ཆུ་མོ་གླང་ལོ་ (female Water-Ox); 780 or 399 or −373

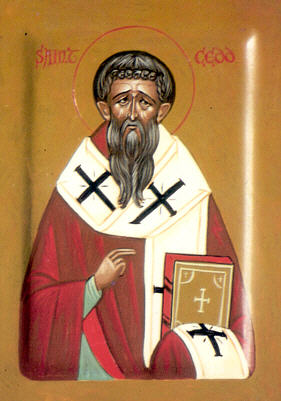
Icon image of Saint Cedd (c. 620–664)

Year 653 (DCLIII) was a common year starting on Tuesday of the Julian calendar. The denomination 653 for this year has been used since the early medieval period, when the Anno Domini calendar era became the prevalent method in Europe for naming years.

== Events ==
=== By place ===
==== Byzantine Empire ====
- Emperor Constans II voluntarily surrenders Armenia to the Arabs, following a truce with Muawiyah, governor of Syria. Muawiyah grants the Armenians virtual autonomy, and appoints the nakharar Theodor Rshtuni as ruler of Armenia.
- Muawiyah leads a raid against Rhodes, taking the scattered pieces of the Colossus of Rhodes (one of the Seven Wonders of the Ancient World) and shipping it back to Syria, where he destroys the bronze scrap to make coins.

==== Europe ====
- King Rodoald is murdered after a six-month reign, and is succeeded by Aripert I, who is elected as king of the Lombards. He spreads Catholicism over the Lombard realm and builds many new churches through the kingdom.
- Atto succeeds Theodelap as duke of Spoleto, in Central Italy (approximate date).

==== Britain ====
- King Penda of Mercia secures dominance over the area of Middle Anglia, where he establishes his son Peada as ruler.
- Peada marries Alchflaed, daughter of King Oswiu of Bernicia, and is baptised at Ad Murum (in the region of Hadrian's Wall) by bishop Finan.
- King Œthelwald of Deira rejects Oswiu's overlordship, and turns to Penda instead. Penda mounts another attack against Bernicia (approximate date).
- Talorgan I, nephew of Oswiu, is crowned king of the Picts. He probably accepts Northumbrian overlordship and pays tribute.
- King Sigeberht I of Essex dies after a 36-year reign, and is succeeded by his relative Sigeberht II.
- Sigeberht II is persuaded by Oswiu to adopt Christianity, as part of a mobilization against Penda.

==== Asia ====
- Emperor Kōtoku sends an embassy to the court of the Tang dynasty in China. Japanese ambassadors, priests and students sail for the capital Chang'an, but some of the ships are lost en route.
- Prince Tenji of Japan changes his residence to Asuka (Nara Prefecture), with other imperial family members and ministers. Only Emperor Kōtoku stays in the Naniwa Palace (approximate date).

=== By topic ===
==== Religion ====
- June 17 – Pope Martin I is arrested in the Lateran in Rome, along with Maximus the Confessor, on the orders of Emperor Constans II, and taken to imprisonment in Constantinople.
- Northumbrian missionaries under St. Cedd are despatched to Essex, to found the monastery at Bradwell-on-Sea.
- The Temple of Sinheungsa in Gangwon Province (South Korea) is constructed by the Buddhist monk Jajang.

== Births ==
- Childeric II, king of the Franks (approximate date)
- Li Xian, prince of the Tang dynasty (d. 684)

== Deaths ==
- March 6 – Li Ke, prince of the Tang dynasty
- September 30 – Honorius, archbishop of Canterbury
- Abbas ibn Abd al-Muttalib, uncle of Muhammad (approximate date)
- Chen Shuozhen, Chinese rebel leader
- Chindasuinth, king of the Visigoths
- Marcán mac Tommáin, king of Uí Maine (Ireland)
- Plato, exarch of Ravenna
- Rodoald, king of the Lombards
- Romaric, Frankish nobleman
- Sigeberht I, king of Essex
- Talorc III, king of the Picts
- Theodelap, duke of Spoleto (approximate date)
- Zhang Xingcheng, chancellor of the Tang dynasty (b. 587)
