= Nocera Umbra =

- Comune
- Comune di Nocera Umbra
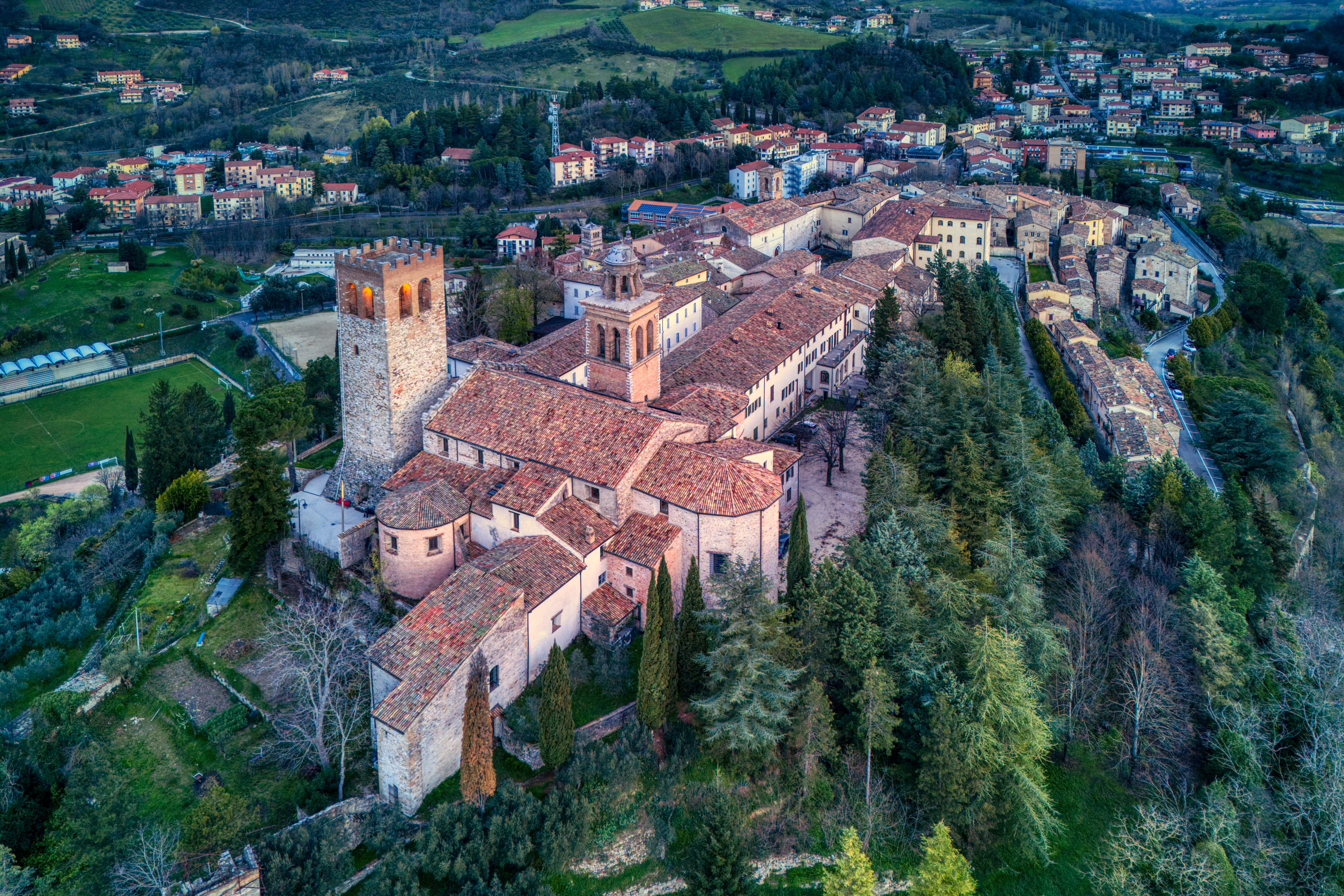
- View of Nocera Umbra

- Coat of arms

- Location within Italy Location within Umbria
- Coordinates: 43.111284°N 12.790092°E
- Country: Italy
- Region: Umbria
- Province: Perugia (PG)
- Frazioni: see list

Government
  - Mayor: Giovanni Bontempi

Area
  - Total: 157 km^{2} (61 sq mi)
- Elevation: 520 m (1,710 ft)

Population (1 January 2025)
  - Total: 5,506
  - Density: 35.1/km^{2} (90.8/sq mi)
- Demonym: Nocerini
- Time zone: UTC+1 (CET)
  - Summer (DST): UTC+2 (CEST)
- Postal code: 06025
- Dialing code: 0742
- Patron saint: St. Raynald of Nocera
- Saint day: February 9
- Website: Official website

Nocera Umbra is a town and comune in the province of Perugia, Italy, 15 kilometers north of Foligno, at an altitude of 520 m (1,710 ft) above sea-level.

The municipality, covering an area of 157.19 km^{2} (60.69 sq mi), is one of the largest in Umbria. It is one of I Borghi più belli d'Italia ("The most beautiful villages of Italy").

== Etymology ==
Writers long confused Nocera Umbra with the other Nocera in Campania, which the Romans called Nuceria and also Constantia. Nocera Umbra instead bore the name Nuceria Camellaria.

Pliny refers to its inhabitants as Favonienses and Camellani, designations whose meaning has been uncertain. Jacobilli attempted to explain them by suggesting that they arose when the inhabitants of Favonia (today Pieve Fanonica) moved to Nocera after their city was destroyed, and when the inhabitants of the castle on Mount Camellano likewise took refuge there after its destruction. These conjectures lack historical foundation.

== History ==
=== Antiquity ===
From the late 8th century BC, the area of present-day Nocera Umbra was occupied by an Umbrian community. This community was established across the territory, with burial areas at Portone and Boschetto–Ginepraia. The name nuvkri, attested in an Umbrian inscription, is generally connected with this settlement.

From the 3rd century BC, following the Battle of Sentinum and the opening of the Via Flaminia (222–220 BC), Nuceria developed in relation to this major route. The settlement became integrated into the Roman system and is recorded as a municipium within Regio VI, with its population divided into the groups of the Nucerini Camellani and the Nucerini Favonienses.

During the imperial period, the urban center was situated around the hill now occupied by the historic core of Nocera Umbra and extended into the adjacent northern plain. By the 3rd century AD, the town possessed a structured civic body, attested by the presence of an ordo decurionum.

Strabo describes Nocera as a very populous city of important position because it stood on the Via Flaminia, a road much frequented under the Romans. He also mentions the wooden vessels and utensils manufactured there. Claudius Ptolemy includes it among the colonies established by Augustus.

After the fall of the empire, it suffered during the barbarian invasions of the Goths and later the Lombards, who devastated it.

=== Middle Ages ===
In 571 Nocera entered the Duchy of Spoleto.

In the 8th century Nocera formed part of the domains of the Church. Anastasius recounts that when Pope Stephen III appealed to Pepin against Aistulf, who had occupied various lands of the Church, the latter was compelled not only to restore those territories but also to return Nocera.

In the placitum of Duke Gisulf held at Rieti in 761, among the judges appears Eleuterio, gastald of Nocera.

In 824 Nocera became a county, as did the neighboring territories of Gualdo, Fossato, and Sigillo.

Around 1100 it developed into a self-governing town and joined the Guelph League, formed in 1154, in opposition to Gubbio. In 1198 it returned under Church rule.

During the 13th and 14th centuries Nocera's history was marked by alliances, wars, and internal rebellions, set against the wider conflict between the papacy and the empire. In 1202 it submitted to Perugia, and in 1216 it allied with Perugia during a border dispute between Gubbio and Perugia. In 1226 Emperor Frederick II supported its occupation by Berthold, son of the deposed Duke of Spoleto. In 1249 Frederick II confirmed possession, and the city was sacked. In 1251, after Frederick's death, Nocera again submitted to Perugia, which also defended it from Gubbio.

In the early 14th century Nocera played a defensive role for Perugia, guarding Apennine passes. In this period Federico I da Montefeltro drove the Ghibellines to seize a number of cities, including Nocera. In 1305 Guelph alignment was restored after the Trinci took Foligno, but in 1315 new rebellions were linked to a resurgence of the Ghibellines. In 1371 the municipal statute was revised. In the late 14th century Nocera was briefly occupied by Biordo Michelotti, before returning to Church rule in 1398.

In 1400 Nocera was taken by Gian Galeazzo Visconti, lord of Perugia, and after his death in 1402 it passed to the Trinci. In 1421 the Trinci were massacred in the fortress, followed by retaliation by Corrado Trinci. After 1421 the pope sent Francesco Sforza, who occupied Nocera for some months, after which it returned to Trinci control until 1439. In 1439 it passed again under Church rule.

In 1458, Jacopo Piccinino, who had been sent by the king of Naples to assist Federico of Urbino, instead occupied Assisi, Gualdo, and Nocera with his troops. After the election of Pius II, Ferdinand of Naples ordered Piccinino to cease troubling the cities of the Papal State and to abandon Nocera . Further rebellions followed, but the Church eventually regained control.

=== Early modern and contemporary era ===
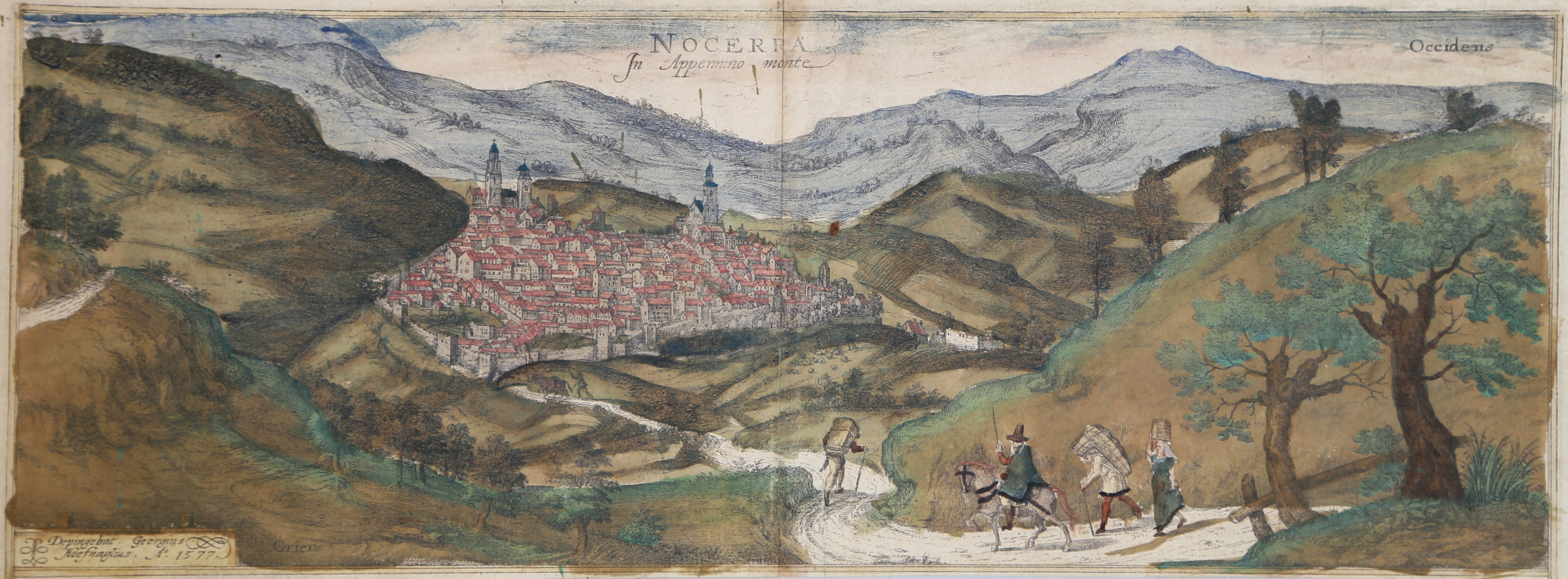
View of Nocera Umbra in 1577 by Joris Hoefnagel

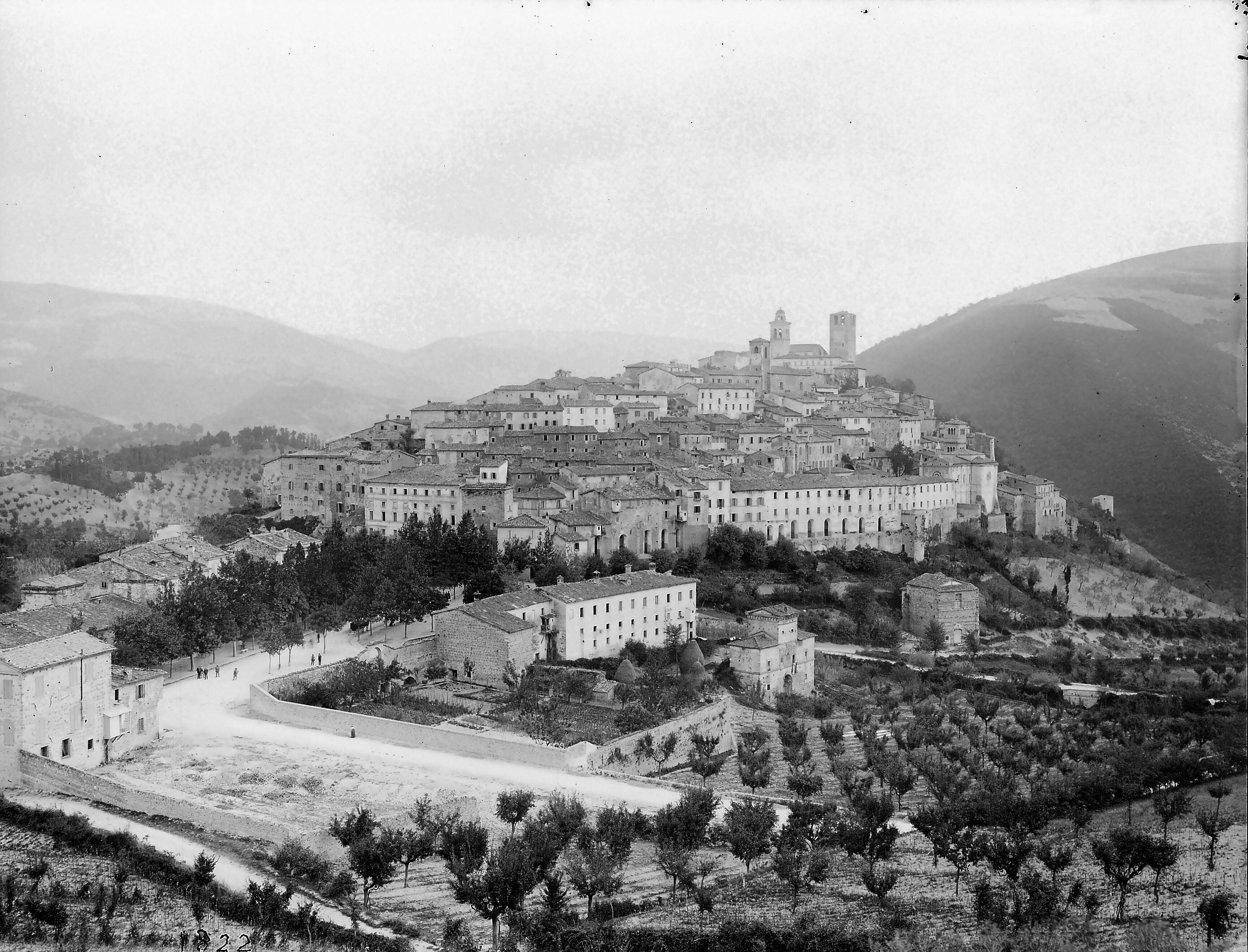
Nocera in 1907

In the early 1500s Nocera was occupied by Gian Paolo Baglioni after it hosted Perugian exiles. Afterwards it became definitively part of the Papal State. During the papal period it was administered by governors appointed by the state, responsible for justice, public order, and oversight of local councils.

On 15 February 1798, during the Roman Republic, Nocera became the capital of a canton in the Trasimeno Department. After the fall of the Roman Republic, in August 1799, Austrian occupation followed in Umbria. French rule returned in June 1809. In 1810 a single Trasimeno Department was established, and Nocera was made a canton-capital municipality. In the 1810s French reforms were introduced, accompanied by anti-clerical policies and the suppression of convents, monasteries, and religious corporations in the Nocera area. French occupation in Umbria ended in May 1814.

In 1816–1817 Nocera became the seat of a second-rank governor within the Delegation of Perugia. On 17 December 1860 a royal decree annexed Umbria to Piedmont. In 1863 the municipality was renamed Nocera Umbra.

In the mid-19th century the city itself had 3,719 inhabitants, of whom 1,082 lived in the city and 2,637 in the surrounding rural settlements.

In 1924 Nocera Umbra lost its courthouse, land-registry offices, and financial offices.

The town and the surrounding hamlets have been struck by earthquakes. The last major ones were the 1997 Umbria and Marche earthquakes which occurred on September 26, 1997. The damage caused by the last of these has been fully repaired in 2016.

== Geography ==
Nocera Umbra stands on the slopes of the Apennines at an elevation of 548 metres (1,798 ft) above sea level, on the right bank of the Topino River. To the north lies the wide plain of Gualdo Tadino, while to the south flows the steep river Topino, and a ring of mountains stands opposite the town. Monte Pennino rises between Nocera and the territory of Camerino.

Because the settlement lies on the slope of the mountain, the streets are steep, while the square alone is level.

The climate is said to be very mild in summer and rather cold and dry in winter. The prevailing winds are from the east and north.

=== Subdivisions ===
The municipality includes the localities of Acciano-Fossaccio, Bagnara, Bagni Stravignano, Boschetto, Campodarco, Casaluna, Case Basse, Castiglioni, Cellerano, Collecroce, Colsantangelo, Costa, Gaifana-Colle, Grillo, Isola, Lanciano, Le Prata, Maccantone, Mascionchie, Molina, Molinaccio, Mugnano, Nocera Scalo, Nocera Umbra, Palazzo, Pertana, Ponte Parrano, Salmata, Schiagni, Serre Parrano, Sorifa, Trombone, Villa Postignano, Ville Santa Lucia, Vittiano.

In 2021, 1,442 people lived in rural dispersed dwellings not assigned to any named locality. At the time, the most populous locality was Nocera Umbra proper (1,764).

== Economy ==
Nocera gained considerable renown for its mineral waters, which spring at the bathing establishments of Bagni, Bagnara, and Schiagni, all about 3 miles (4.8 km) from the city.

Hydrotherapy and spa tourism played a prominent role in the local economy beginning in the early modern period, later supplanted by commercial water bottling and export.

=== Mineral waters ===
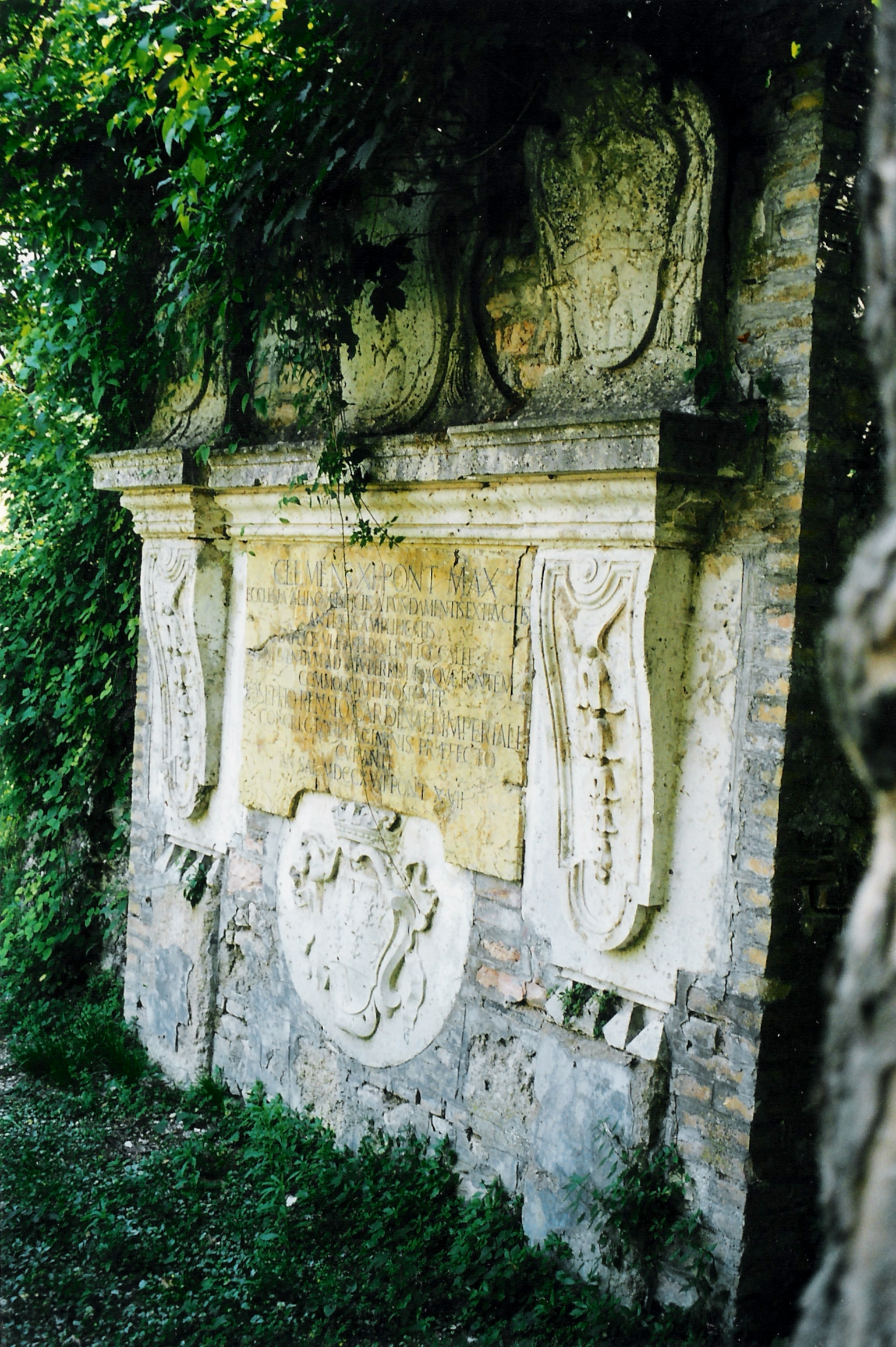
Bagni di Nocera, 1717 inscription for expansion works under Pope Clement XI

Sorgente Angelica rises in the locality of Bagni di Nocera and is the oldest of the three main springs in terms of commercial exploitation. The practice of hydrotherapy with this water is noted from 1500, later reaching a high point with the opening of a thermal center near the spring, which became a sought-after destination in central Italy before declining at the end of the 19th century. At the same time, the commercial side expanded, and the water became increasingly exported.

The reputation of the water is celebrated in verses attributed to Francesco Redi, in which the character Arianna, suffering from illness, calls for the water of Nocera as a remedy. Over the centuries, numerous scientific writings addressed the characteristics of the water. In September 1805 Alexander Humboldt and Gay-Lussac came to Nocera to analyze it.

Sorgente Flaminia rises in the locality Le Case. Its waters are conveyed to the plant at Nocera Scalo, where they are bottled and marketed under the name "Nocera Umbra sorgente Flaminia". Sorgente del Cacciatore, also called del Centino, rises near Schiagni and is characterized by mineral properties considered suitable for therapeutic uses.

=== Nocera mineral baths ===
The spring is also linked to a period in which Nocera was a destination for spa tourism among nobility and the bourgeoisie. The spring later lost its earlier prominence.

A road about 5 kilometres (3.1 mi) long leads from the town to the establishment known locally as the Bagni. The establishment stands at the site where celebrated mineral waters emerge, known since ancient times. The spring rises from the flank of a mountain situated to the south-east of Nocera, at a distance of 3 miles (4.8 km) from the town..

Two large palaces stand at the site, with porticoes for walking and a spacious square decorated with a fountain that pours out abundant water. The more recent building stands on the road leading to the baths, while the other was constructed at the very point where the spring emerges. One inscription on the façade of the first spring near the old palace records that it was built in 1611 through the efforts of Monsignor Domenico Marini, governor-general of Umbria under Pope Paul V. An inscription in red stone on the façade of the palace records that the building was constructed by order of Pope Alexander VII in 1665.

== Infrastructure and transport ==
=== Roads ===
The municipality is served by the SS 3 Flaminia rebuilt as a variant through the junctions of Nocera Scalo, Nocera Umbra and Colle/Gaifana.

=== Railways ===
Nocera is served by the Rome–Ancona railway line, on which the station of the same name (in the frazione Nocera Scalo) is located.

== Religion and culture ==
=== Duomo ===
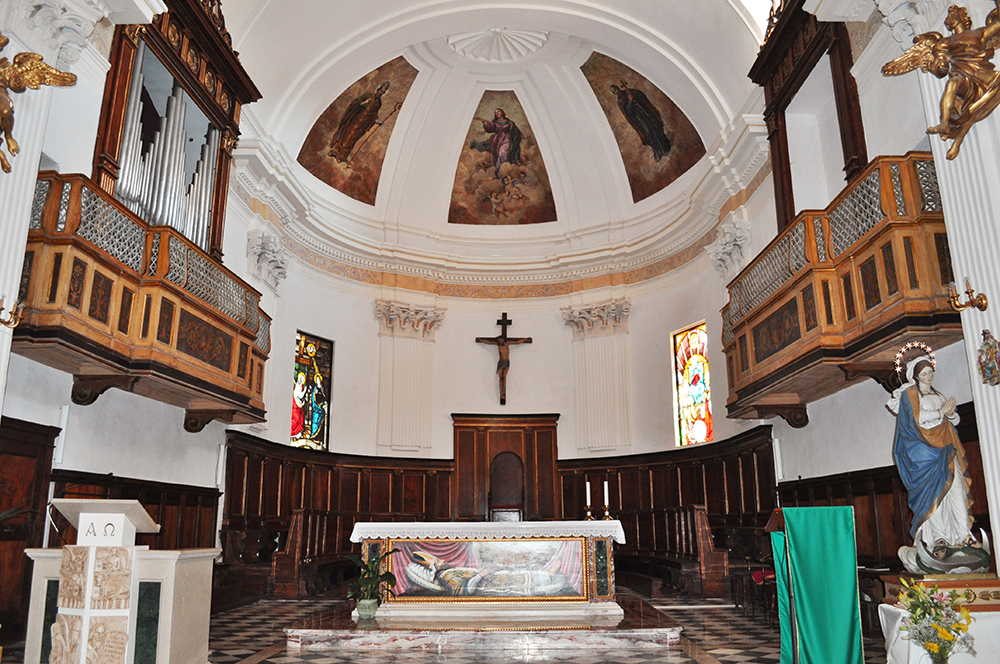
Apse and presbytery of the cathedral of Nocera Umbra

The Duomo is the principal church of Nocera Umbra and was the mother church of the former Diocese of Nocera and Gualdo until 1986. Located on the summit of the hill, the site is connected to the replacement of pagan worship with Christian worship, with the possibility that a temple to the goddess Favonia once stood here. In the 5th century, when the diocese of Nocera was established, the temple was turned into a church and dedicated to Mary.

From a restructuring around the 10th century, a Romanesque portal survives at a side entrance, decorated with carved stone motifs of vines and animals along the archivolt band. Another probable survival from this cathedral is a massive stone cross containing an incised cross, preserved in the diocesan museum. After the destruction of Nocera by Frederick II in 1248, the church was abandoned, and in 1448 it was rebuilt on the ancient foundations. The architecture was a single nave with a roof supported by large arches and timbering in a Franciscan style, still visible in the Church of San Francesco. The stone ornaments of the main façade belong to a modern renovation from 1925.

The interior presents a large nave with a semicircular apse. This rebuilding dates to the early 19th century and is Neoclassical in style, with columns, pilasters, and plaster vaults.

Inside, on the right wall, the first chapel contains a tempera panel with a gold background representing, at the top, the Conception of Mary, God blessing, Saint Anne, and Saint Joachim. On the pillars are depicted Saints Paul, Blaise, Agnes, and Mary Magdalene. The work belongs to the Umbrian school and dates to the end of the 15th century, as indicated by the inscription mentioning the pontificate of Alexander VI.

In the sacristy is a large architectural altarpiece with the Nativity of Christ, the Virgin, and various saints, the work of Niccolò da Foligno, dated 1483.

The cathedral is dedicated to the Most Holy Assumption. Saint Raynald, bishop and citizen of Nocera, is co‑patron of the city. His incorrupt body is venerated in a richly adorned urn beneath the high altar, and his feast is celebrated on 9 February. The joint feast of the co‑patrons takes place on 19 September.

The co‑patrons are Saint Felice, priest, and Saint Costanza, widow, regarded as the first martyrs of Umbria and patricians of Nocera. Their bones are preserved in the cathedral and were already recognized in the 16th century.

=== Former church of San Francesco ===
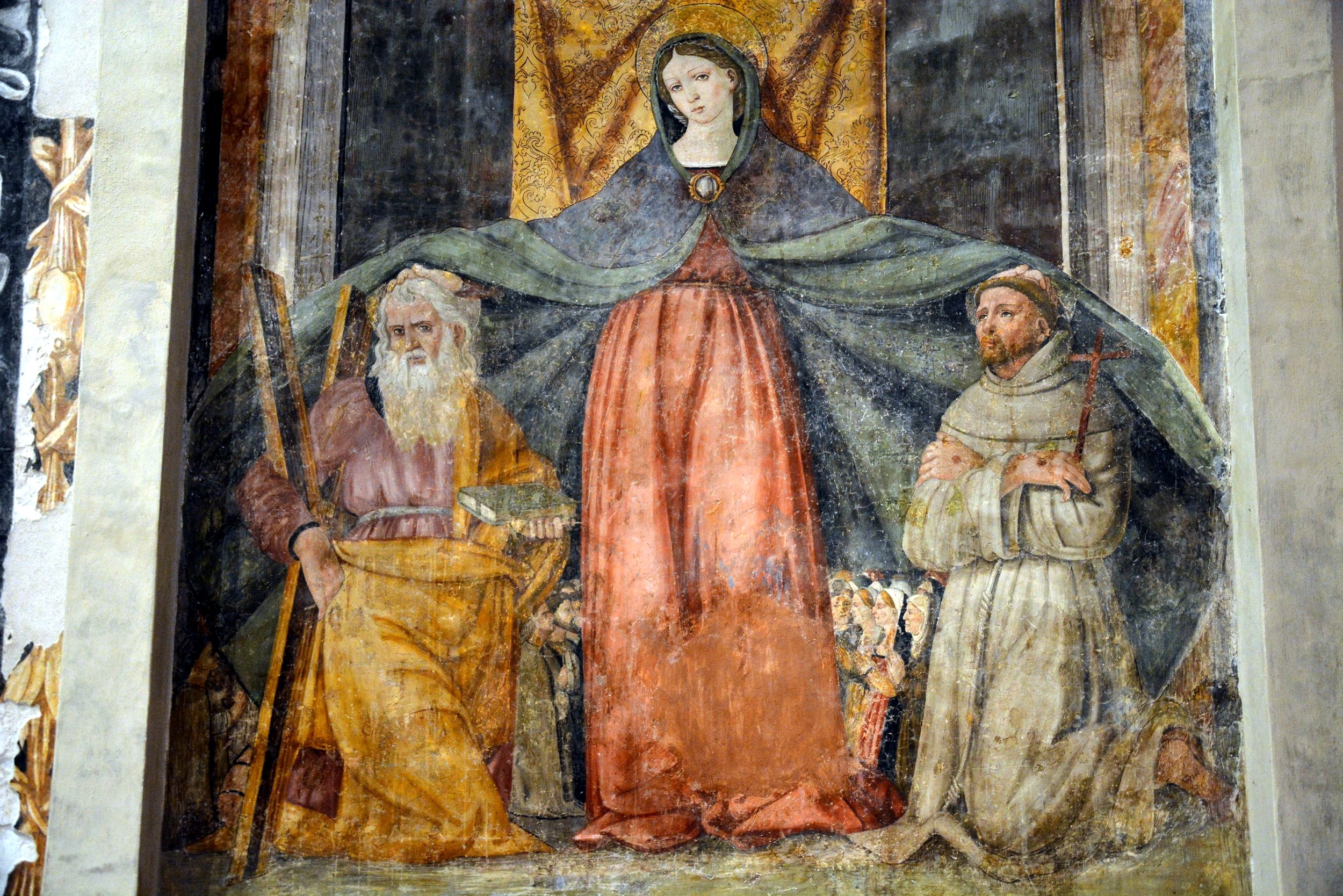
Madonna protecting worshippers beneath her cloak, fresco in the Pinacoteca Comunale

The 15th-century Church of San Francesco serves as the seat of the Pinacoteca and Municipal Museum. The church has a single-nave plan, articulated by five large arches that mark the bays, and ends in a polygonal apse. The pitched nave roof is supported by the large arches, while the apse has a covering formed by a domed apse vault. Access is placed along the side wall facing the square, so the main front extends along the full length of the church.

The façade is built of squared stone and has two portals, one a main Gothic-style marble portal and a secondary linteled portal with an arched lunette above; a stone cornice runs at about two-thirds of the height, and above it opens a single-arched window. The secondary door and the single-arched window, both Romanesque, are attributed to an earlier phase of the church.

Inside are 15th-century frescoes by Matteo da Gualdo and local painters, and additional fresco paintings dating from the 14th to the 16th centuries on the remaining walls. The church also houses artworks brought from various churches in Umbria and numerous archaeological finds.

The original layout dates to the early 14th century, when the Franciscans received permission to build a convent within the city and chose to occupy and later enlarge a small oratory in what was then the municipal square. The first enlargement works were completed by the end of that century, documented by an inscription plaque to the left of the Gothic portal. These works likely altered the church’s orientation, with the altar placed to the north, and expanded its area to about double that of the earlier building.

Throughout the 15th century additional interior works were carried out, supported by donations from the inhabitants of Nocera Umbra. In 1494 another restructuring began, including raising the wall facing the square and creating the internal arches. In 1500 a bell tower was added to the left of the apse, square in plan, with the bell chamber opened by four single-arched windows.

The church remained a seat of the Franciscan order until the Napoleonic suppression of 1809. In the 1950s the Pinacoteca was established.

The museum also houses artefacts from the Roman era, including a milestone on the Via Flaminia to Ancona, a female portrait, mosaic fragments, a 3rd-century memorial stone and parts of a funerary monument decorated with four Greek inscriptions, by Bishop Varino Favorino da Camerino, a famous Greek scholar who published one of the first dictionaries of the Greek language and was Greek teacher at the Medici court in Florence for the future Popes Leo X and Clement VII and also held the chair of Greek at the University of Rome.

=== San Filippo ===
The Church of San Filippo is reached by a street with 17th-century porticoes in the upper part of Nocera Umbra. The building was constructed in a Neo-Gothic style between 1864 and 1868 to a design by Luigi Poletti. The porticoed façade is decorated with a large rose window flanked by the symbols of the four Evangelists (Eagle, Angel, Lion, and Bull). Inside, the high altar holds a painting of the Death of Saint Philip with an apparition of the Madonna by Francesco Grandi. In the sacristy there is an 18th-century painting of the Beheading of John the Baptist.

The interior recalls, on a smaller scale, the upper basilica of Saint Francis at Assisi.

=== Other religious institutions ===
The church of San Giovanni Battista contains notable altar structures in wood, masterfully carved and gilded. An oil painting representing Jesus, the Virgin, Saint Francis, Saint Augustine, and Saint Monica was painted by Bandiera.

In the 19th century, Nocera also had a renowned seminary capable of accommodating 40 students and an ecclesiastical college or boarding institute capable of accommodating 50. Degrees in theology were conferred.

=== Palazzo Vescovile ===
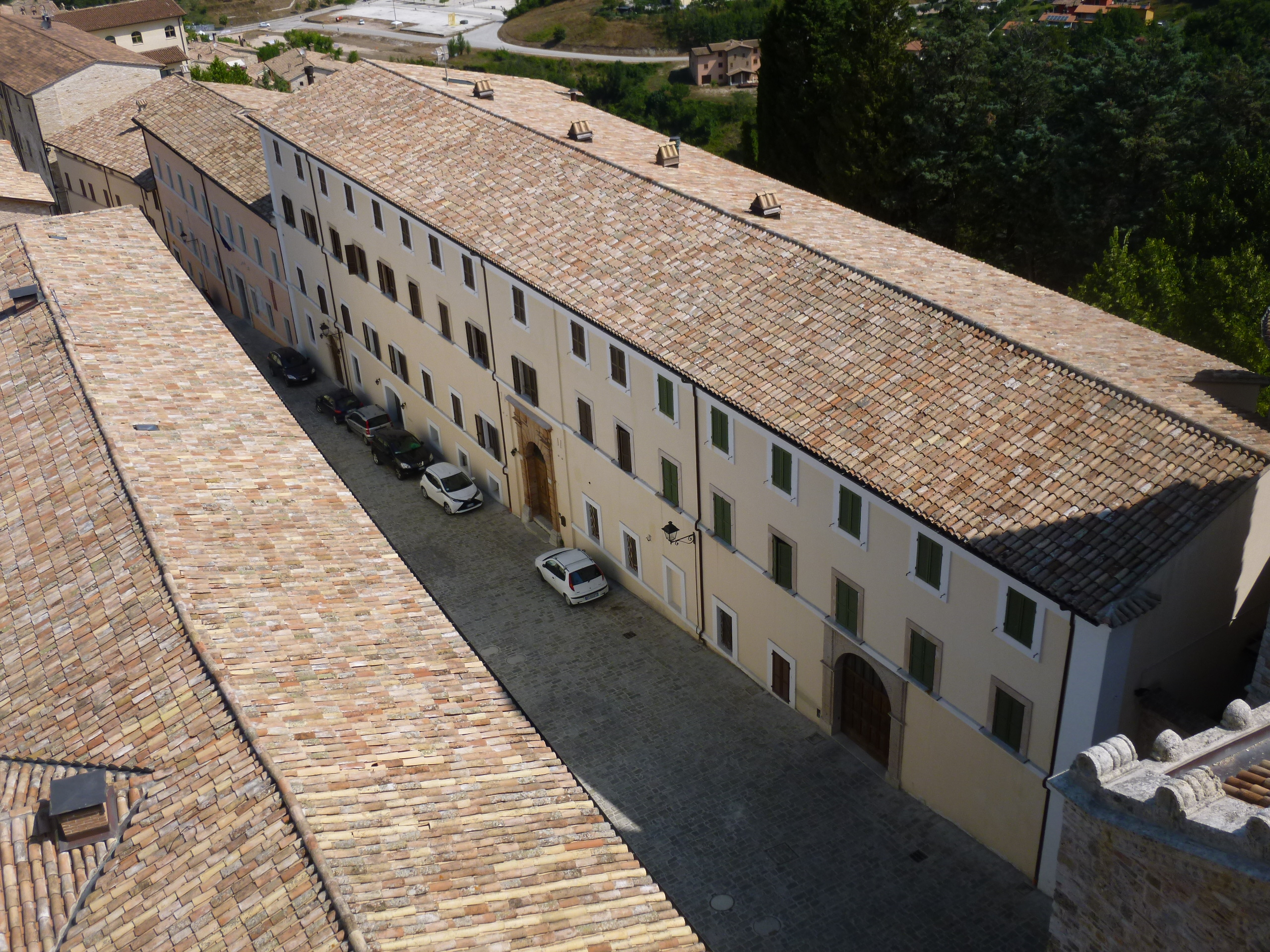
Palazzo Vescovile

The Palazzo Vescovile preserves several works of art. Among them is a tempera panel representing Mary with Jesus and Saint John in the manner of the Perugian school.

The library contains several tempera panels: Saint John Chrysostom in imitation of the Greek school; a sainted bishop of the 12th century from the Italian school; the Marriage of Saint Catherine, a Tuscan work of the 15th century; and Mary with Jesus from the Sienese school. On the upper floor are preserved an Annunciation, an oil painting copied by Barocci after Sassoferrato; another painting of Mary with Jesus by Sassoferrato; and a painting of Saint Anthony of Padua by the same artist.

=== Rocca of Nocera ===
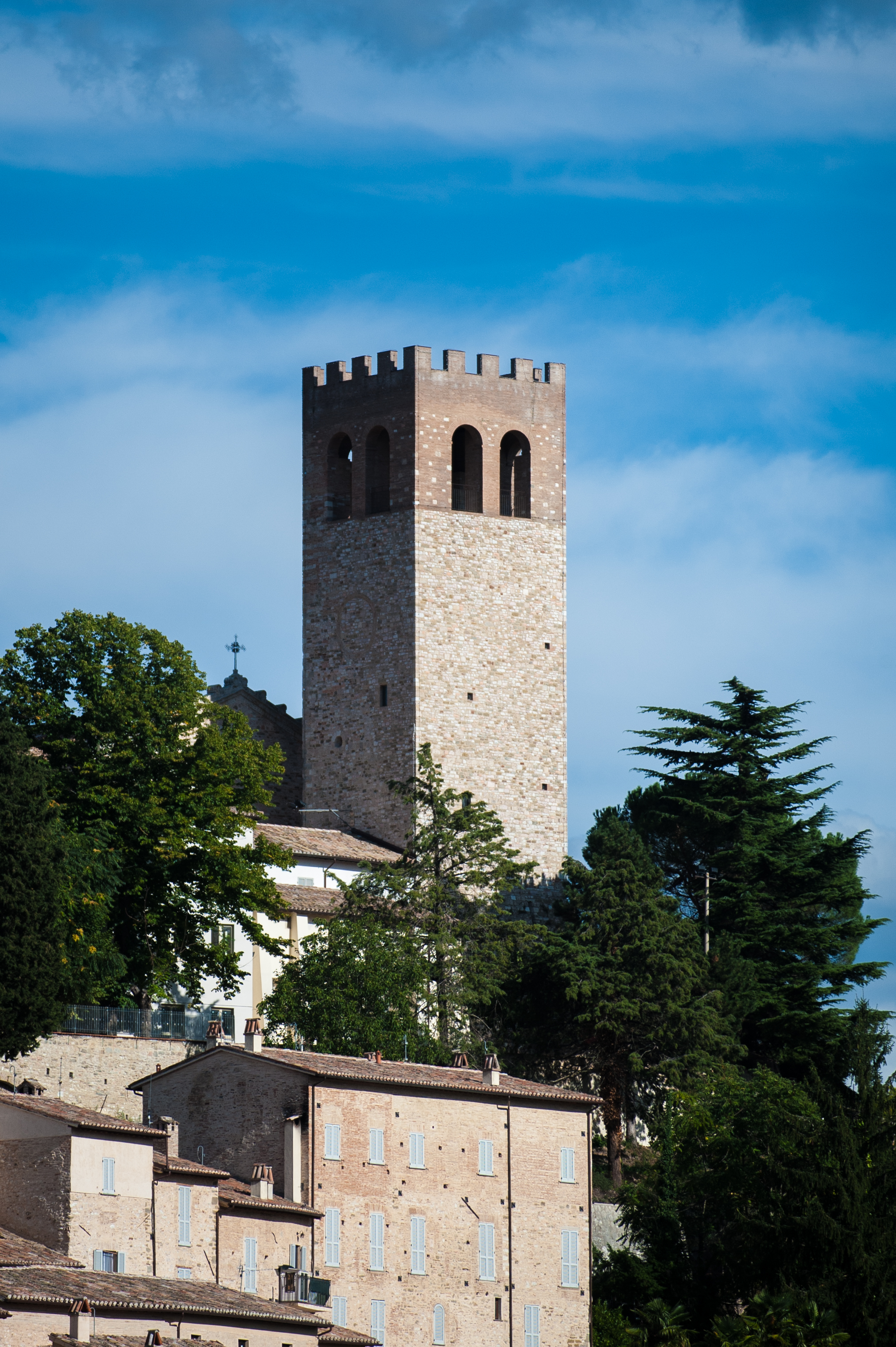
The Campanaccio, after its reconstruction because of the 1997 earthquake

Behind the parish church, on the edge of a steep rocky escarpment overlooking the road that leads to the baths, stand ruins of the medieval rocca. A square tower and part of the adjoining building remain.

The town is dominated by the Campanaccio, the large tower that is the symbol of the town, the only remnant of the sturdy fortress of its Gastalds, then its Counts, dating back to the 11th century. The building commemorates the massacre of the Trinci family, which took place in 1421. The tower was almost completely destroyed by the 1997 earthquake (only part of one side remained standing) and rebuilt.

=== Necropolis ===
The necropolis of Nocera Umbra, located in the locality of Portone to the north of the town along the Via Flaminia, is one of the most important Migration Period burial sites discovered in Italy. A total of 168 tombs were excavated, and the findings were published in 1918 by Pasqui and Paribeni.

The burials included numerous rich objects, often in gold and silver, such as elements of weapon suspension belts, fibulae, and jewelry. The necropolis of Nocera Umbra was associated with the Lombards. The grave goods from the necropolis were transferred to Rome, where they were housed in the Museo dell'Alto Medioevo. A smaller portion of the grave goods is also preserved in the Museo dell'Alto Medioevo in Spoleto and in the Museo Archeologico in Nocera Umbra.

== Notable people ==
Nocera was the birthplace of several notable figures. The Jesuit Varino Favorino, bishop and author of a Greek dictionary printed in Basel in 1541, was born there and served as teacher to Pope Leo X. A copy of his dictionary is preserved in the Piervisani Library of Nocera.

Also from Nocera was Bishop Giovio, renowned for his histories, and the Jesuit Father Francesco Acerbi, a distinguished Latin poet of his time. Siccius Dentatus, friend of Cicero, was likewise associated with the city.

Twelve bishops originated from Nocera. Felicissimo Salvini served as archbishop of Camerino. Camilli became commander‑in‑chief of the papal galleys. Bishop Piervisani enriched the cathedral with sacred furnishings in the manner of a Roman basilica. Tommasuccio da Foligno, a 14th-century hermit-turned-itinerant preacher and prophetic poet, was born in the outskirts of the town.

In the 19th century, the wealthiest family of the city was the noble counts Olivieri, later Olivieri‑Benigni after the extinction of the male line. Another particularly prominent noble family was the Giacobuzi, represented by Angelo Giacobuzi. Other noble families included the Troili, Fantozzi, and Morselli.

== Twin towns ==
- Frosinone, Italy
- Gabicce Mare, Italy

== Sources ==
- Sigismondi, Gino (1979). Nuceria in Umbria (in Italian). Foligno: Ediclio.
- Boschi, Enzo; et al. (1988). I terremoti dell’Appennino umbro-marchigiano area sud orientale dal 99 a.C. al 1984 (in Italian). Bologna: ING-SGA, Bologna.
