= Thrasamund (disambiguation) =

Thrasamund and its variants (Thrasimund, Transimund, Transamund and Transmund) are masculine given names of Gothic origin.

It may refer to:

- Thrasamund (450–523), king of the Vandals
- Transamund I of Spoleto, duke from 665 to 703
- Transamund II of Spoleto, duke on three occasions between 724 and 745
- Transamund III of Spoleto, duke from 983 to c. 989, also count Transmund I of Chieti
- Transmund II of Chieti, count from c. 989 to 1017
- Transmund III of Chieti, count in the 1050s
- Transmund IV of Chieti, count in the 1070s
- Transmund (bishop of Valva), from 1073 to 1081
