= Teodelapio =

Sculpture by Alexander Calder

Coordinates: 42.7477°N 12.7365°E

- Artist: Alexander Calder
- Year: 1962
- Type: sculpture
- Dimensions: 18 m (59 ft)
- Location: Spoleto, Italy
- Owner: Comune di Spoleto

Teodelapio is the only monumental stabile sculpture in Italy by Alexander Calder. Situated in Spoleto it was designed and donated to the city for the 1962 edition of Festival dei Due Mondi. It was part of the open-air exhibition "Sculture in Città" (Sculptures in the city) organized by Giovanni Carandente.

The sculptor had a long correspondence with Carandente about how to make it and where to place it. Starting from the idea of realizing a mobile, Calder chose to build a stabile.

The sculpture is made of black painted steel and takes its name from Theodelap of Spoleto. Located in front of Spoleto's train station, it has become a symbol of the city.

The model was sent to the Italsider factory in Savona where it was magnified 27 times and built in 1 cm-thick steel used for hulls, then brought to Spoleto where it was assembled and welded together.

Carandente about the origin of the name of the sculpture:

At the Hotel dei Duchi in Spoleto, Calder found some copies of old prints depicting Lombard dukes. Looking at the pictures of duke Theodelap with his sharp-pointed crown, Calder said without hesitation: "This is the name of the object"

== See also ==
- List of Alexander Calder public works
