= Gisulf =

Gisulf is the name of several figures in the political history of Italy:

- Gisulf of Spoleto
- Gisulf I of Friuli
- Gisulf II of Friuli
- Gisulf I of Benevento
- Gisulf II of Benevento
- Gisulf I of Salerno
- Gisulf II of Salerno
