= Classis =

Classis may refer to:

- Classis (ecclesiastical), governing body of pastors and elders in certain churches
- Classis (biology), or class, a taxonomic rank or unit in biology
- Classis (port), or Classe, ancient port of Ravenna, Italy
- Roman classis, fleet of Roman navy
