= Lupus of Spoleto =

Lupus ruled the Duchy of Spoleto from 745 to 751. He was relatively independent of royal authority.

He made many donations to the Abbey of Farfa and had a close relationship with Abbot Fulcoald. On his death, the duchy was probably seized by Aistulf and then granted to one Unnolf for a brief spell.

== Early dukedom ==
In February 745 a text written in the Sabina records only a Picco as gastald of the city of Rieti and does not name a duke of Spoleto, indicating that the duchy did not yet have its own duke at that time.

By September and November 745 Lupus is named as duke of Spoleto. The sources do not state whether he was chosen by the assembly of the leading men of Spoleto or appointed by King Ratchis.

The Farfa chronicle catalogue records the name of Lupus as duke, and the catalogue of the Farfa cartulary places him in the year 746 with indiction 14. The dating corresponds to the beginning of his rule in 745, likely after 1 September when indiction 14 began.

A charter issued by Duke Lupus in December of indiction 14 records the first year of his dukedom, confirming that his elevation had already occurred by late 745.

== Later reign ==
Another charter issued in September of indiction 15, corresponding to 746, counts the second year of Lupus's dukedom, confirming that his first year had already been running in September 745.

A charter issued by Duke Lupus in April 751, published in the Annales Benedictini by Jean Mabillon and later by Ludovico Antonio Muratori, identifies Ermelinda as the wife of Duke Lupus.

After April 751 the name of Duke Lupus no longer appears in public acts connected with the duchy of Spoleto. No narrative account of his deeds is preserved, and the surviving information about him comes from a small number of charters preserved in the Farfa cartulary.

== Possible loss of the duchy ==
During the reign of the Lombard king Aistulf, chronological notes in texts written in the duchy of Spoleto record only the king's name, together with the gastald of Rieti when acts were written in that territory, and do not mention a duke.

From these indications Giuseppe Simone Assemani proposed that King Aistulf may have taken the duchy of Spoleto from Lupus and governed it through gastalds.

A Farfa text written at Rieti in 770 includes among the witnesses a man described as "Lupus vir illustris". Because this title among the Lombards was used for leading members of the nobility, the presence of a man named Lupus with this title at Rieti in 770 has been connected with the former duke.

These circumstances have been used to suggest that Lupus either lost the duchy through royal action or relinquished it voluntarily, since examples are known of Lombard dukes being removed by kings or abandoning the office themselves.

== Sources ==
- Hodgkin, Thomas. Italy and her Invaders. Clarendon Press: 1895.

Regnal titles
Preceded by Thrasimund II	Duke of Spoleto; 745–751	Succeeded by Unnolf
