= Faroald II of Spoleto =

8th-century Italian duke

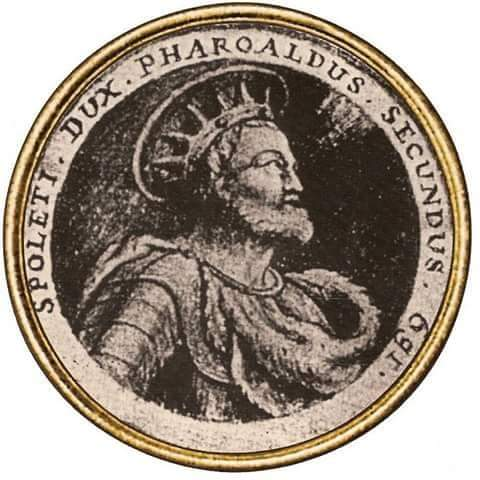
Faroald II

Faroald II (also spelled Faruald) was the duke of Spoleto from 703, when he succeeded his own father Thrasimund I.

Faroald ruled along with his mother Wachilap. He attacked and took Classis, the port of Ravenna, but he was ordered to return it by King Liutprand. Faroald also founded and endowed the monastery of San Pietro in Valle at Ferentillo. In 724, Faroald's son Thrasimund rebelled against his father and put him in a monastery.

== Sources ==
- Paul the Deacon. Historia Langobardorum. Translated by William Dudley Foulke. University of Pennsylvania: 1907.
- Everett, Nicholas. Literacy in Lombard Italy, c. 568–774. Cambridge: Cambridge University Press, 2003. ISBN 0-521-81905-9.
- Hartmann, Ludo Moritz. Geschichte Italiens im Mittelalter. Gotha, 1903.
- Hodgkin, Thomas. Italy and her Invaders. Clarendon Press: 1895.
- Pabst, H. "Geschichte des langobardischen Herzogthums." Forschungen zur deutschen Geschichte Vol. II, p. 405. Göttingen, 1862.

| Preceded by Thrasimund I | Duke of Spoleto; 703 – 724 | Succeeded by Thrasimund II |
