= Raynald of Nocera =

Italian Roman Catholic saint

Saint Raynald OSB

Bishop of Nocera Umbra
- Born: ca. 1150; Postignano, Nocera Umbra, Italy
- Died: 9 February 1217; Nocera Umbra, Italy
- Venerated in: Roman Catholic Church
- Canonized: XIII Century
- Major shrine: Nocera Umbra's Dome
- Feast: 9 February
- Attributes: Bishop's attire over his monastic habit

Raynald was a Benedictine monk and Bishop of Nocera Umbra. Born around 1150, in the village of Postignano, near Nocera Umbra, Italy, to parents of German descent.

He entered the monastery of Santa Maria di Vallemergo in 1199, that belonged to the Benedictine congregation of Fonte Avellana, along with Trasimundus, the future bishop of Senigallia. He was elected prior of the monastery of Santa Croce di Fonte Avellana, though the date is unknown. On 7 February 1218, the monastery was taken under the protection of the Holy See by Pope Honorius III, renewing the privilege granted by Pope Innocent II in 1139. In 1218, Raynald accompanied the bishops Gerard of Ancona and Trasimundus of Senigallia to Fano, to negotiate the release of the imprisoned bishop Riccardo. In September 1218, Raynald visited the monastery of Santa Esuperanzio in Cingoli, where he acted as witness to a grant to the monastery. He then visited Senigallia and finally returned to his monastery at Fonte Avellano.

Raynald was appointed Bishop of Nocera Umbra in 1213. He was a close friend of Francis of Assisi and one of the seven bishops who consecrated the Portiuncula at Assisi, and proclaimed the Portiuncula indulgence. Raynald served as Bishop of Nocera until his death in 1217.

== Bibliography ==
Gibelli, Alberto (1895). Monografia dell'antico monastero di S. Croce di Fonte Avellana: i suoi priori ed abbati. Faenza: P. Conti. pp. 142–147.
