= Berthold of Urslingen =

German nobleman (1217–1234)

Berthold of Urslingen (fl. 1217–1234) was a German nobleman whose career was spent almost entirely in central Italy, where his family had a claim to the duchy of Spoleto.

In 1217–1218, Berthold led negotiations with the Papacy for the return of Spoleto to his family's control. Despairing of this, in 1222 he led a military campaign to conquer the duchy. Although called back by the Emperor Frederick II, he remained in good standing at the imperial court. In 1226–1228, he was the vicar in charge of imperial finances in Tuscany.

Berthold played a major role in the War of the Keys between the Empire and the Papacy in 1228–1230, leading the invasion of the march of Ancona, for which he was excommunicated. After the war, he rebelled against Frederick. He survived two separate imperial sieges in Antrodoco in 1231–1232. In 1233, he left Italy for Germany, where he joined the court of Frederick's son, King Henry VII, who seems to have briefly recognized him as duke of Spoleto before he disappears from the historical record. He was dead by 1251.

== Claiming Spoleto ==
Berthold was the second son of Conrad of Urslingen, who became duke of Spoleto in 1177. He may have been born in Swabia, where his noble family originated, or perhaps even in Italy, where he passed most of his life.

In 1213, King Frederick II of Germany ceded the duchy of Spoleto to the Papal State. The heirs of Conrad spent the following decades trying to reclaim their patrimony. In September 1217, Berthold was in Rome representing his older brother Rainald in negotiations with Pope Honorius III. An agreement was reached by 30 September, by which Honorius would have enfeoffed Rainald with the duchy, but Rainald refused it. In late 1218, Berthold returned to Rome, where he negotiated a settlement for his father's widow (probably not his mother), giving her control of the city and county of Nocera, but could not come to terms on the question of the duchy.

By 1219, Berthold was in the service of Frederick II. In 1222, he joined with Gunzelin of Wolfenbüttel in a unilateral effort to take back the duchy of Spoleto without Frederick's sanction. The two occupied the cities of Foligno, Gubbio, Nocera and Trevi. They forced the inhabitants to swear oaths of fealty to Frederick, now emperor, but on 22 November he ordered them to cease and desist. Berthold was reprimanded in a letter and Frederick expressly disavowed any interest in interceding on his behalf with the pope. This incident of insubordination did not, however, provoke a permanent break between Berthold and the king. After abandoning the duchy, Berthold was at Frederick's court in Sora on 19 March 1223.

== Vicar in Tuscany ==
On 20 May 1226, Frederick II appointed Berthold as a vicar in Tuscany under the authority of his brother Rainald, who was the imperial legate there. Berthold's remit seems to have been limited to financial administration. Nevertheless, he used his position to intercept travellers and letters on their way to Rome, about which Honorius complained to Frederick on 26 July 1226. Late in 1226, he suppressed a rebellion by Rainald, count of Barete, who had entrenched himself in Antrodoco.

In January 1227, Honorius III complained to Frederick II that Berthold was committing depredations in papal territory. In June 1227, Berthold appointed a procurator to collect imperial taxes in Siena. He may have been appointed podestà of Ascoli Piceno in 1227 over Honorius' opposition. An episode from 1227 that may shed light on Berthold's character is preserved in a document from Rieti. According to the scribe Matthew, Berthold was presented with a letter sealed by the bishop of Narni. Upon being told that it concerned his dispute with the cathedral of Rieti, he refused to accept it, telling the envoy, "Go and stick the letter up a donkey's arse".

In the summer of 1228, while Frederick was away on the Sixth Crusade, Berthold and Rainald jointly invaded the Papal State. Berthold took the duchy of Spoleto and waited at Nocera for a time before joining his brother in the march of Ancona. In late November, Pope Gregory IX excommunicated Frederick, Rainald and Berthold, the latter expressly for illegally occupying the castle of San Quirico. He then launched the War of the Keys against Frederick. Berthold was forced back into the kingdom of Sicily by a papal army under John Colonna. In August 1229, his excommunication was re-confirmed. It was re-confirmed again by the pope on 4 April 1230, before the Treaty of San Germano ended the war in July.

== Rebellion ==
After the peace of San Germano, Frederick II had Rainald arrested, whereupon Berthold went into open revolt. In or after May 1231, he ensconced himself in Antrodoco. Later in 1231 and again in April 1232, he beat off sieges by imperial troops, led the second time by Thomas of Acerra. In April 1233, Frederick sent Rainald in the custody of the justiciar Henry of Morra to Antrodoco to induce Berthold's surrender. The archbishop of Messina, Lando of Anagni, negotiated on behalf of the emperor. In July 1233, Berthold handed Antrodoco over to Henry in exchange for his freedom (Rainald having already been freed).

Following his surrender of Antrodoco, Berthold went to Germany, then ruled by Frederick's young son, Henry VII, was pursuing policies at odds with his father's. On 10 May 1234, Berthold signed a charter of Henry's bearing the title "duke of Spoleto" (dux Spoleti). This is the last record of him. He is not known to have taken part in Henry's open rebellion later that year. If he was still alive, he presumably retired to family estates in Swabia. He was dead by 1251, when his sons, Berthold and Rainald, came to an agreement with the town of Rieti.

Berthold's impact on central Italy over more than a decade is summed up in a comment by Thomas, bishop of Rieti (1250–1265), when he writes that Bishop Rainald (1215–1234) "was unable fully to exercise episcopal jurisdiction for ten years and more because of the malice of the times and because of wars", citing the War of the Keys and the wars of Berthold and Rainald specifically.

== Bibliography ==
- Brentano, Robert (1994). A New World in a Small Place: Church and Religion in the Diocese of Rieti, 1188–1378. University of California Press.
- Loud, Graham (2016). "The Papal 'Crusade' against Frederick II in 1228–1230". In Michel Balard (ed.). La Papauté et les croisades / The Papacy and the Crusades. Routledge. pp. 91–103.
- Walter, Ingeborg (1967). "Bertoldo di Urslingen". Dizionario Biografico degli Italiani (in Italian). Vol. 9: Berengario–Biagini. Rome: Istituto dell'Enciclopedia Italiana. ISBN 978-88-12-00032-6.
- Waley, Daniel Philip (1961). The Papal State in the Thirteenth Century. Macmillan.
