= Faroald I of Spoleto =

Lombard duke of Spoleto

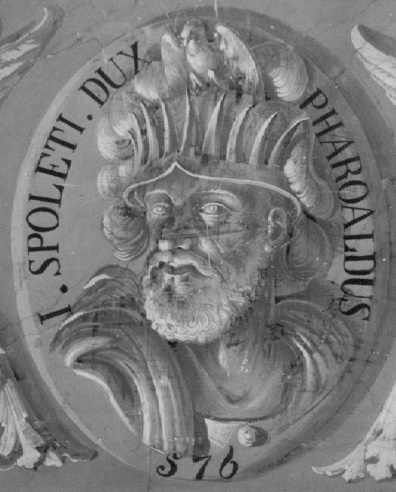
Faroald I of Spoleto, depicted by Giuseppe Moscatelli and Benigno Peruzzi

Faroald I (also spelled Faruald) (died 591 or 592) was the first Duke of Spoleto, which he established during the decade of interregnum that followed the death of Alboin's successor (574 or 575). He led the Lombards into the centre of the Italian peninsula while Zotto led them into the south.

In 579, he sacked Classis, the harbour of Ravenna. Between 584 and 588, Classis was retaken by Droctulf.

His sons fought over the duchy in 602 and Theudelapius was victorious.

== Sources ==
- Paul the Deacon. Historia Langobardorum. Available at Northvegr.

Regnal titles
New creation	Duke of Spoleto; 570–591	Succeeded by Ariulf
