= Werner II of Spoleto =

Werner II was the margrave of Ancona and Duke of Spoleto from 1093 to 1119. He was the founder of the family of the Guarnieri of Urslingen.

Werner was originally a Swabian count who was sent as captain of the German contingent of 700 infantry and cavalry by the Emperor Henry III to assist Pope Leo IX at the Battle of Civitate. Subsequent to that great defeat, during which his Swabians were routed by Richard I of Capua, Werner conquered a swathe of Adriatic territory centred on the Pentapolis. The region was called after him the "March of Werner". He became an ally of the Emperor Henry IV, son of Henry III, in the war against the marchioness of Tuscany, Matilda. Henry appointed him duke of Spoleto in 1093. In 1105, he affirmed him as margrave in the three marches of Ancona, Fermo, and Camerino, which was thereafter called the "March of Ancona", or Marca Anconitana. This forms the basis for the existing Italian region of Marche. He henceforth appears in chronicles and charters as Dux et Marchio Guarnerius and Guarnerio Marchione.

In November 1105, Werner went to Rome with an army of Germans in support of the Antipope Sylvester IV. At his coming, Pope Paschal II fled to the Tiber Island. By force, Werner installed Sylvester in the Lateran. Werner's troops, led by one Berto, were not successful in the long run and Sylvester had to flee Rome for Tivoli, where Werner himself lay encamped. Werner retreated with Sylvester to Osimo.

== Sources ==
- Gregorovius, Ferdinand. Rome in the Middle Ages Vol. IV Part 1. trans. Annie Hamilton. 1905.

Italian nobility
Vacant Part of the March of Tuscany Title last held by Godfrey	Duke of Spoleto; 1093–1119	Vacant Part of Marchioness of Tuscany Title next held by Welf VI
New title Merging of the marches Ancona, Fermo, Camerino	Margrave of Ancona; 1093–1119	Unknown
