= Ariulf of Spoleto =

Ariulf (died 602) was the second Duke of Spoleto from 592 (the death of Faroald) until his own death.

In 592, Ariulf, whose position in Spoleto and control of key points along the Via Flaminia, the main communication between Ravenna and Rome, to cut its alternative, the fortified Via Amerina, and capture several Byzantine cities. He took several strongholds in Latium and threatened Rome, where Gregory the Great, cut off from the exarchate, was forced to make a separate peace with him, to the great dissatisfaction of Romanus, the exarch of Ravenna, who was the imperial representative in Italy. Ariulf's successes were brief: the exarch's forces retook the Roman fortifications and the city of Perugia, and cleared the roads for the time being.

He then assisted Arechis I of Benevento in besieging Naples, another important city of Imperial Italy. He won a great victory at Camerino, where, according to Paul the Deacon, he claimed to have seen Saint Sabinus, the martyred hero of Spoleto, helping him, and was thus led to convert to Catholic Christianity.

== Sources ==
- Paul the Deacon (1907). History of the Lombards. Translated by Foulke, William Dudley. Philadelphia: University of Pennsylvania.

Regnal titles
Preceded by Faroald I	Duke of Spoleto; 592–602	Succeeded by Theodelap
