= Agiprand of Spoleto =

Agiprand was briefly the Duke of Spoleto between 742 and 744.

In late 741, Thrasimund II refused to return to Pope Gregory III those cities he had promised him and Gregory's successor, Zachary, turned for support to King Liutprand. Zachary donated a Roman army to support the Lombards and together they took Spoleto and Liutprand installed his own nephew, Agiprand, as duke.

Agiprand was already the duke of Clusium when he was invested with Spoleto. Agiprand escorted Zachary back to Rome from Interamna and restored the cities he requested.

Agiprand's reign did not survive the death of Liutprand, when he was removed from power by Thrasimund.

== Sources ==
- Paul the Deacon. Historia Langobardorum. Translated by William Dudley Foulke. University of Pennsylvania: 1907.
- Hartmann, Ludo Moritz. Geschichte Italiens im Mittelalter. Gotha, 1903.
- Hodgkin, Thomas. Italy and her Invaders. Clarendon Press: 1895.
- Pabst, H. "Geschichte des langobardischen Herzogthums." Forschungen zur deutschen Geschichte Vol. II, p. 405. Göttingen, 1862.

Regnal titles
Preceded by Thrasimund II	Duke of Spoleto; 742–744	Succeeded by Thrasimund II
