= Thrasimund I of Spoleto =

Italian noble

Thrasimund I or Transamund I was the Count of Capua and then Duke of Spoleto (663 – 703 AD), a faithful follower of Grimoald I of Benevento.

Thrasimund assisted Grimoald in usurping the kingship of the Lombards. In return, Grimoald gave him his daughter in marriage and granted him the duchy of Spoleto after the death of Atto. Thrasimund co-ruled with his brother Wachilapus and was succeeded by his son Faroald II after a reign of forty years.

== Sources ==
- Paul the Deacon. Historia Langobardorum.
- Hodgkin, Thomas. Italy and Her Invaders. Volume VI.

Regnal titles
Unknown	Count of Capua ???-663	Unknown
Preceded by Atto	Duke of Spoleto; 663–703 with Wachilapus	Succeeded by Faroald II
