= Hilderic of Spoleto =

Hilderic was the Lombard Duke of Spoleto briefly from 739 to 740. He was the first appointee of Liutprand, King of the Lombards, against the rebellious Thrasimund II.

Liutprand took Spoleto on 16 June 739 and appointed Hilderic as replacement duke. Thrasimund fled to Rome, where Liutprand besieged him. Peace was soon mediated between king and pope by the envoys of Charles Martel, Duke of the Franks. In the meantime, Thrasimund took advantage and united with a papal army and the forces of Godescalc of Benevento and retook his duchy in December 740. He killed Hilderic.

== Sources ==
- Paul the Deacon. Historia Langobardorum. Available at Northvegr.

Regnal titles
Preceded by Thrasimund II	Duke of Spoleto; 739–740	Succeeded by Thrasimund II
