= Unulf of Spoleto =

Unulf (or Unnolf) was possible a Duke of Spoleto briefly in 752. He is recorded to have reigned for a few years, but this is uncertain. Aistulf, the king, took the duchy into his hands sometime (either immediately or after a brief period corresponding to Unulf's reign) after the death of Lupus.

== Sources ==
- Hodgkin, Thomas. Italy and Her Invaders. Clarendon Press: 1895.
- Sansi, A. I Duchi di Spoleto.

Regnal titles
Preceded by Lupus	Duke of Spoleto; 752	Succeeded by Aistulf
