= Theodicius of Spoleto =

Theodicius was the Duke of Spoleto from 763 to 773. Though it is often stated that he died at the Siege of Pavia (774), he was still alive on 9 June 776, when Charlemagne confirmed the properties of the monastery of Farfa and Abbot Ingoald in the reign of his successor Hildeprand.

== Sources ==
- Hodgkin, Thomas. Italy and her Invaders. Clarendon Press: 1895.
- Costambeys, Marios. Power and Patronage in the Early Medieval Italy: Local Society, Italian Politics, and the Abbey of Farfa, c.700–900. Cambridge University Press: 2007.

Regnal titles
Preceded by Gisulf	Duke of Spoleto; 763–773	Succeeded by Hildeprand
