= Atto of Spoleto =

7th-century Italian duke

Atto (or Hatto) was the Duke of Spoleto from 653 to 663, the successor of Theodelap.

Nothing is known of his reign except that he was replaced by Thrasimund, Count of Capua.

Regnal titles
Preceded by Theodelap	Duke of Spoleto; 653–663	Succeeded by Thrasimund I
