= Gisulf of Spoleto =

8th-century Italian noble

Gisulf was the Duke of Spoleto from 759 to 761.

In 758, Desiderius, after putting down a revolt of the Duke Alboin, took control of the Duchy of Spoleto until April of the next year, when he appointed Gisulf to govern the duchy in his name. Gisulf reigned until 761, when he died or was deposed. He was replaced sometime between September 762 and March 763 by Theodicius, another follower of Desiderius.

== Sources ==
- Hodgkin, Thomas. Italy and her Invaders. Clarendon Press: 1895.

Regnal titles
| Preceded by Alboin | Duke of Spoleto; 759–761 | Succeeded by Theodicius |
