= Transamund II of Spoleto =

8th-century Italian duke

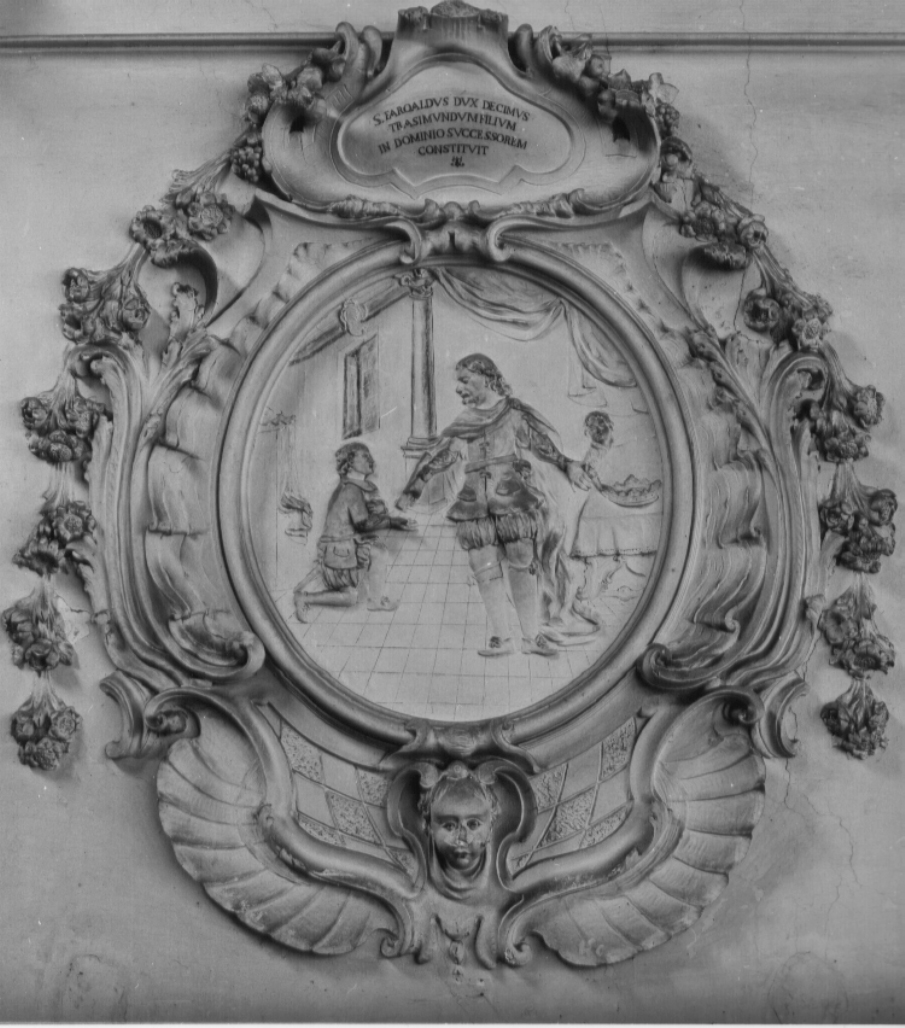
Faroald appointing his son Transamund as successor, 18th century bas-relief

Transamund II (Note: His name may also be spelled Transimund, Transmund, Thrasimund or Thrasamund.) was the Lombard Duke of Spoleto from 724 to 745, though he was twice driven from power by the king, Liutprand. Transamund rose to power by deposing his own father, Faroald II, and tonsuring him in a monastery.

== Conflict with Liutprand ==
In 737 or 738, Transamund captured Gallese and thus disrupted communication between Rome and Ravenna. Pope Gregory III offered to pay for the return of Gallese in return for a peace treaty with Transamund. The treaty included the Gregory, Duke of Benevento. Liutprand rejected the treaty as contrary his interests and attacked Transamund as a traitor. He had taken Spoleto by 16 June 739 and appointed Hilderic as his replacement. Transamund fled to Rome, where Liutprand besieged him. The king took Amelia, Orte, Bomarzo, and Bieda, but still the pope refused to release his refugee. Gregory even wrote to ask Charles Martel, Duke of the Franks, for assistance. Charles, however, refused.

== Return to power ==
In December 740, Transamund recovered his duchy and killed Hilderic with Papal-Beneventan aid, but did not return the confiscated papal cities and his alliance with the pope ruptured. Liutprand did not recognise Transamund's reconquest and set out to dispossess him a second time. This time Liutprand met with Gregory's successor, Zachary, in 742 and, promising to restore the four towns, allied with the Romans and forced Transamund to flee again. Transamund was caught and put in a monastery. Agiprand, Liutprand's nephew, was put in his place. The new duke of Benevento, Godescalc, who had succeeded Gregory without royal assent and continued to support Transamund, was the next object of royal wrath.

On Liutprand's death in 744, Transamund managed to regain power in Spoleto. He lasted another year under the weak King Hildeprand the Useless until he died.

== Sources ==
- Paul the Deacon. Historia Langobardorum. Translated by William Dudley Foulke. University of Pennsylvania: 1907.
- Hartmann, Ludo Moritz. Geschichte Italiens im Mittelalter. Gotha, 1903.
- Hodgkin, Thomas. Italy and her Invaders. Clarendon Press: 1895.

Regnal titles
| Preceded by Faroald II | Duke of Spoleto; 724–739 | Succeeded by Hilderic |
| Preceded by Hilderic | Duke of Spoleto; 740–742 | Succeeded by Agiprand |
| Preceded by Agiprand | Duke of Spoleto; 744–745 | Succeeded by Lupus |
