= Theodelap of Spoleto =

7th-century Italian duke

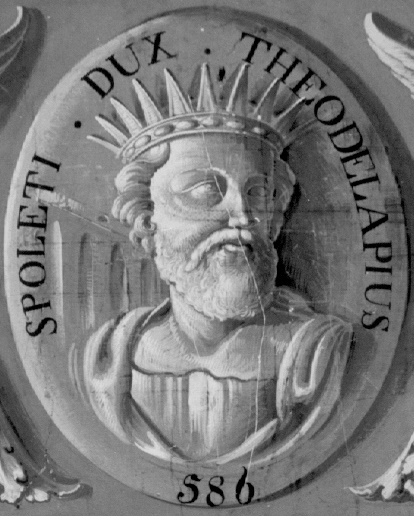
Depiction of Theodelap by Giuseppe Moscatelli and Benigno Peruzzi, in the Town Hall of Spoleto

Theodelap or Theudelapius was one of the sons of Faroald, the first Duke of Spoleto. After the death of Ariulf in 601 or 602, Theodelap and his brother fought for the throne. Theodelap won and was crowned duke. He held the dukedom for more than half a century, until his death. His reign was nevertheless uneventful and he appears to have been largely or completely independent of royal authority throughout. He was succeeded by Atto.

An image of Theodelap inspired Alexander Calder's monumental sculpture Teodelapio outside Spoleto railway station.

== Sources ==
- Paul the Deacon. Historia Langobardorum.

Regnal titles
Preceded by Ariulf	Duke of Spoleto; 602–652	Succeeded by Atto
