= Duke of Spoleto =

Medieval feudal title

The Duke of Spoleto was the ruler of the Duchy of Spoleto during the Early and High Middle Ages (c. 570 – 1300). The first dukes were appointed by the Lombard king, but they were independent in practice. The Carolingian conquerors of the Lombards continued to appoint dukes, as did their successors the Holy Roman Emperors. In the 12th century, the dukes of Spoleto were the most important imperial vassals in Italy. From 1198, the Duchy came under the sovereignty of the States of the Church. As a papal province, the duchy continued to exist until 1816. Generally, its governors did not have the right to bear the ducal title, but there were exceptions, among them Guidantonio da Montefeltro, Pedro Luis de Borja and Franceschetto Cybo.

They usually bore the title dux et marchio, "duke and margrave" as rulers of both Spoleto and Camerino.

== List of dukes ==
Historical sources preserve conflicting lists of the dukes of Spoleto, owing to gaps in medieval documentation and variations in historiographical interpretations. The following list is based on the 7th edition of Cronologia, cronografia e calendario perpetuo.

=== Lombard supremacy ===
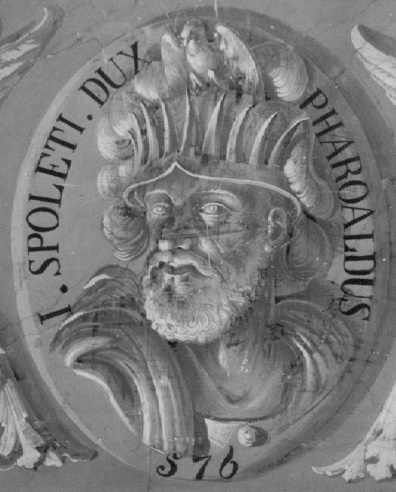
Faroald I, first duke of Spoleto

- Faroald I 570–592
- Ariulf 592–602
- Theodelap 602–650
- Atto 650–665
- Transamund I 665–703
- Faroald II 703–724
- Transamund II 724–739, first time
- Hilderic 739
- Transamund II 739–742, second time
- Agiprand 742–744
- Lupus 745–752
- Unulf 752
- Alboin 757–759
- Gisulf 758–763
- Theodicius 763–773
- Hildeprand 774–788

=== Frankish supremacy ===
- Winiges 789–822
- Suppo I 822–824
- Adelard 824
- Mauring 824–836
- Berengar 836–841
- Guy I (son of Lambert I of Nantes) 842–858
- Lambert I (son of Guy I) 860–871, first time
- Suppo II 871–874
- Lambert I 875–879, second time
- Guy II 876–882
- Guy III (son of Lambert I; king of Italy, 889–894) 880–894
- Lambert II (king of Italy, 891–898) 894–898
- Guy IV (duke of Benevento, 895–897) 895–898

=== Feudal duchy ===
- Alberic I 898–922
- Boniface I 923–928
- Theobald I 933–936
- Anscar of Ivrea 936–940
- Sarlio 940–943
- Hubert of Tuscany 943–946
- Boniface II 946–953
- Theobald II 953–959
- Transamund III 959–967
- Pandulf I 967–981
- Transamund IV (duke of Camerino, 982–995) 982–989
- Hugh I (margrave of Tuscany) 989–999
- Adhemar 999–...
- Romanus 1003–...
- Rainier I (duke of Tuscany, 1014–27) 1010–1014
- Hugh II 1020–1035
- Hugh III 1036–1043

=== Tuscan supremacy ===
- Boniface (margrave of Tuscany, 1027–52) 1050–1052
- Matilda (margravine of Tuscany, 1076–1115) 1053–1056, first time
- Pope Victor II 1056–1057
- Godfrey (duke of Lower Lorraine, 1056–1070) 1057–1070
- Matilda 1070–1082, second time
- Rainier II 1082–1086
- Werner II of Lenzburg (margrave of Ancona, 1095) 1093–1119
- Welf III of Bavaria (margrave of Tuscany, 1152–1160 and 1167–1171) 1152–1160
- Welf VI of Bavaria (Imperial vicar of Tuscany, 1160) 1160–1167
- Welf VI 1167–1171
- Ridelulf of Urslingen 1172–...
- Conrad of Urslingen 1183–1190, first time
- Pandulf II 1190–1195
- Conrad of Urslingen 1195–1198, second time

=== Papal supremacy ===
- Berthold of Urslingen 1222–1228
- Rainald of Urslingen 1228
- Conrad III of Urslingen 1227-1267
- Berthold of Urslingen 1251-1276
- Rainald II of Urslingen 1251-1276
- Guidantonio da Montefeltro
- Pedro Luis de Borja, 1456-1458
- Franceschetto Cybo, 1514-1519

=== House of Savoy ===
- Aimone of Savoy-Aosta, 1904-1942
- Umberto di Savoia, since 2009

== Historiography ==
The reconstruction of a reliable series of the dukes of Spoleto is hindered by the scarcity and ambiguity of early sources. In the 17th century Bernardino Campello recorded the dukes in his history of Spoleto, while Camillo Lilii discussed them in his history of Camerino, the second city of the duchy.

Among later scholars, Gaspero Berretti, a Cassinese monk, treated the subject in the Tavola cronografica dell'Italia a' tempi di mezzo, included in the tenth volume of Ludovico Antonio Muratori's collection. Further attempts were made by Giuseppe Simone Assemani in De Italia Historia Scriptoribus, by Pratillo in the prolegomena to the works of Paul the Deacon, and by Grimaldi, Spinelli, and Turchi in the Serie de' vescovi di Camerino. Alessandro Di Meo later attempted to correct earlier series in his Manuale cronologico, though without complete accuracy.

Several scholars relied on catalogues preserved in the archive of Farfa Abbey, first published by Jean Mabillon in the Museo Italico and later reproduced by Muratori in the Chronicon Farfense. The Farfa archive forms the principal documentary basis for the duchy, containing thousands of records from the Duchy of Spoleto dating mainly to the 8th-10th centuries, many naming the reigning duke in their dating clauses.

Despite their importance, neither the Farfa catalogues nor Muratori's chronological notes provide a secure framework. Reconstruction of the ducal succession is further hindered by limited narrative sources for the Lombard and Carolingian periods. Paul the Deacon presented an unsystematic account of events without precise chronology. Even the Farfa documents themselves, though they frequently name a duke in the dating clause, do not always specify the year of accession, making it difficult to determine the beginning and duration of individual reigns.

== See also ==
- List of dukes and princes of Benevento
- List of princes of Salerno
- List of princes of Capua
