= Perto =

Perto (Italian: Pertone) was the Abbot of Farfa from 854/7 to 872. Between 857 and 859 he received a privilege from the Emperor Louis II confirming a cella (probably a small monastic house) called Santa Maria del Mignone. Since this is the first time Santa Maria is mentioned in Farfa's possession it may have been acquired around this time by Perto. Louis's diploma confirmed privileges granted Farfa by his father, Lothair I, in 840. The imperial diploma forbade any financial imposition ("tribute or census") on Farfa by any pope or secular ruler ("duke or prince"). This diploma may have been aimed at courting good relations with the pope (either Benedict III or Nicholas II) or it may be associated with Louis's intervention in the Duchy of Spoleto in 860. In 864 Louis confirmed Farfa's possessions and, at the insistence of Bishop Peter of Spoleto, protector of the abbey since 840, made a donation to it in the region of Massa Torana.

Around this time Centumcellae, a village on the other side of the valley of Mignone from Santa Maria, was sacked by Saracen marauders. In 854 it was refounded by Pope Leo IV and renamed Leopolis (modern Civitavecchia). Before the ninth century was out Farfa itself would be attacked by Saracens. To them is probably due the obscurity of Farfa's abbots during the period from Perto, who succeeded Hilderic, to Peter, who rescued his monks and his library from the Saracens.

Perto was succeeded by John I.
