= Mauroald =

Mauroald (died 802) was a Frankish monk from Worms and the Abbot of Farfa from 790. Farfa, at less than a century old, was still interested in accruing territories through grants and donations in order to support its building projects and the expansion of its site.

According to Gregory of Catino, the late eleventh-century historian of the abbey, Mauroald was "of the Frankish nation" (natione Francus). He is the only abbot Gregory describes thus, and it probably indicates Mauroald was Germanic-speaking. His two immediate predecessors, Ragambald and Altpert, were also from Francia, although they were probably not Frankish. The period of their abbacies (781–802) has been described as one of "ethnic tension" and the domination of "Frankish ideas", but there is little evidence to support this.

Two charters from 802 and 804 show that Mauroald and his successor Benedict financed the military service of two brothers from the Sabina, Probatus and Picco, sons of Ursus of the Pandoni family, who were serving the army of Charlemagne then targeting the Principality of Benevento.
