= Anselm of Farfa =

9th-century abbot

Anselm (Zelmo) was the Abbot of Farfa between 881 and 883, succeeding John I. His short abbacy is reasonably well-sourced compared to the string of five abbots following him, beginning with Teuto, who were extremely obscure figures even to Gregory of Catino, the abbey's historian of the eleventh century.

In 883 Farfa received a "privilege of greatest freedom" (praeceptum optimae libertatis) and a grant of various properties from the Emperor Charles the Fat. This, the last Carolingian grant to Farfa, is dated only to the year and does not name the abbot. It may have been Anselm, but more probably was Teuto. Charles' chief concern seems to have been the depredations of the Duke Guy II of Spoleto and other "evil men" (pravi homines) then in rebellion against him. He granted several similar (temporarily successful) privileges to other central Italian institutions in the summer of 883 during the height of the challenge to his authority.
