= Ragambald =

Ragambald (died 786) was the Abbot of Farfa from 781 until his death. According to the abbey's twelfth-century historian Gregory of Catino, Ragambald was born in a city in Gaul (Gallia), that is, Francia, but he does not explicitly call him a Frank. Succeeding Probatus, a local-born abbot, Ragambald was the first of a line of abbots from Francia, including Altpert (786–90) and Mauroald (790–802). The significance of the Frankish presence at Farfa and of Ragambald's abbacy is summed up:

. . . the ‘new’ abbeys of the time not only arose under Frankish influence but also infiltrated the religious life of Lombard Italy with ‘Frankish’ ideas and attitudes, providing a kind of ‘fifth column’ that prepared the way for Frankish military victory and a more ready acceptance of Frankish political domination.

Under Ragamblad the abbey's patronage may have declined as compared with that under his predecessor. He is recorded to have received a single grant from Duke Hildeprand of Spoleto during his tenure. This may have been related to Papal encroachments. By the reign of Pope Leo III, Farfa was losing land to the Papacy.
