= March of Fermo =

The March of Fermo (Latin: Marchia Fermana or Firmana, Italian: Marca fermana) was a frontier territory (march) of the Holy Roman Empire in the Kingdom of Italy between the late 10th and early 12th centuries. It faced the Principality of Benevento and later the Duchy of Apulia to the south. It covered part of the modern regions of Marche and Abruzzo.

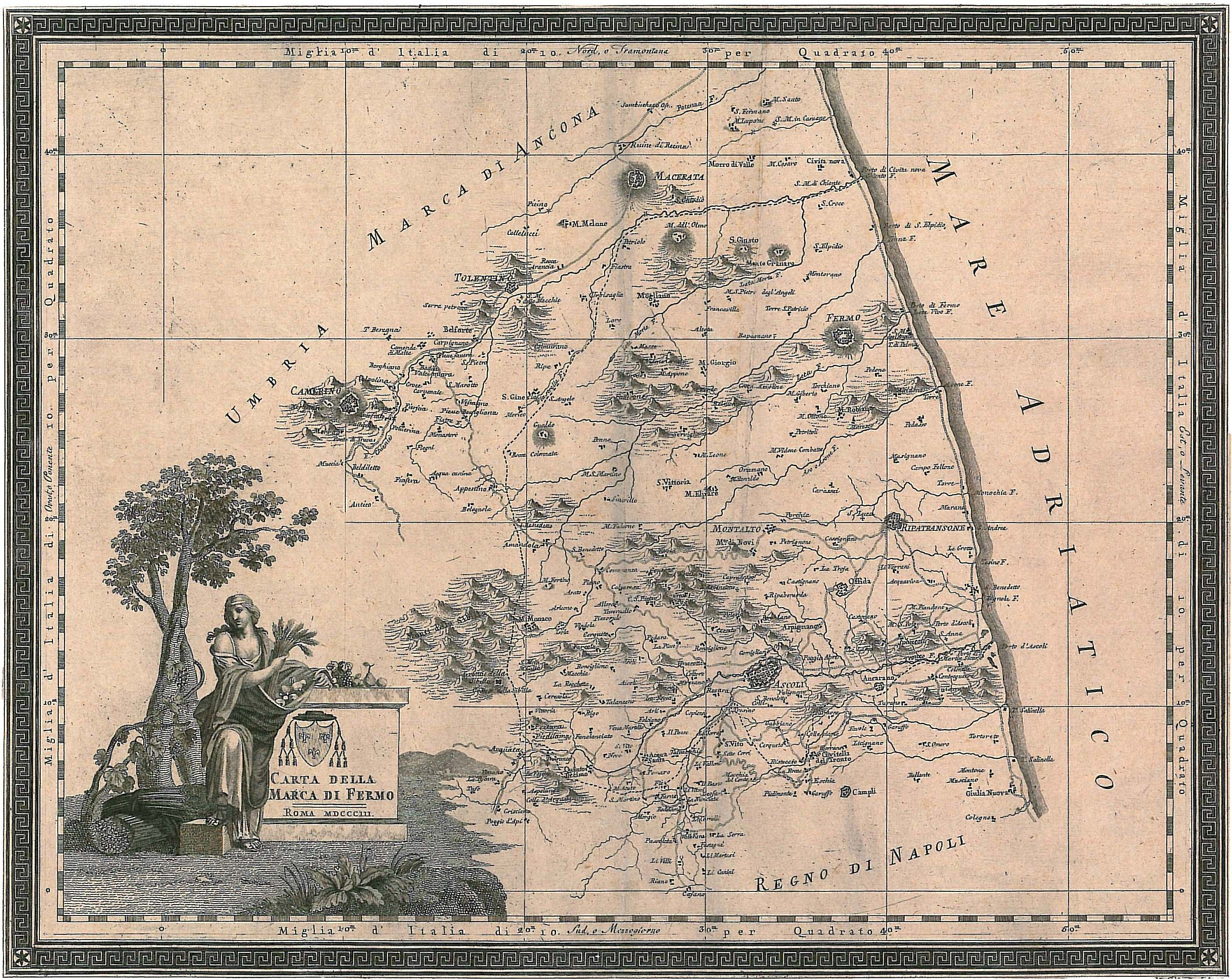
Map of the March of Fermo in 1803

The relationship of the March of Fermo to earlier administrative divisions is uncertain. By the 12th century it had been merged with the March of Ancona. The name continued in use to describe the province around Fermo and in this way formed one of the marches that gave the region of Marche its name.

== Origins ==
The March of Fermo may be a direct continuation of the Duchy of Fermo of the Lombard era. This was created by King Liutprand around 727 out of territory he conquered from the Byzantine Empire. The name of only one duke is recorded, Tasbun, named in an inscription of 769 or 770 at Falerone. The Duchy of Fermo was distinct from the duchies of Ancona and Osimo, probably also created by Liutprand. It survived the Frankish conquest of 774 and is mentioned in a diploma of Charlemagne dated 787. It is uncertain when it was downgraded to a march. A letter of Pope John VIII to the Emperor Charles the Fat dated 882, in which Duke Guy II of Spoleto and his son Guy III, are referred to as margraves (marchiones) for the first time, may indicate the shift.

The March of Camerino, detached from the Duchy of Spoleto in the 9th century, may be identical to the March of Fermo first attested in the 10th. In the early 840s, the march(es) of Fermo and Camerino were devastated by Saracen raiders.

The March of Fermo is first attested in a diploma of Emperor Otto II in 983. Writing in the 11th century, Hugh of Farfa and Gregory of Catino refer to the March of Fermo in connection with the reign of King Hugh of Italy (926–947) and the abbacy of Rimo of Farfa (920–930). The march included the four counties of Fermo, Camerino, Ascoli and Abruzzo.

== Papal involvement ==
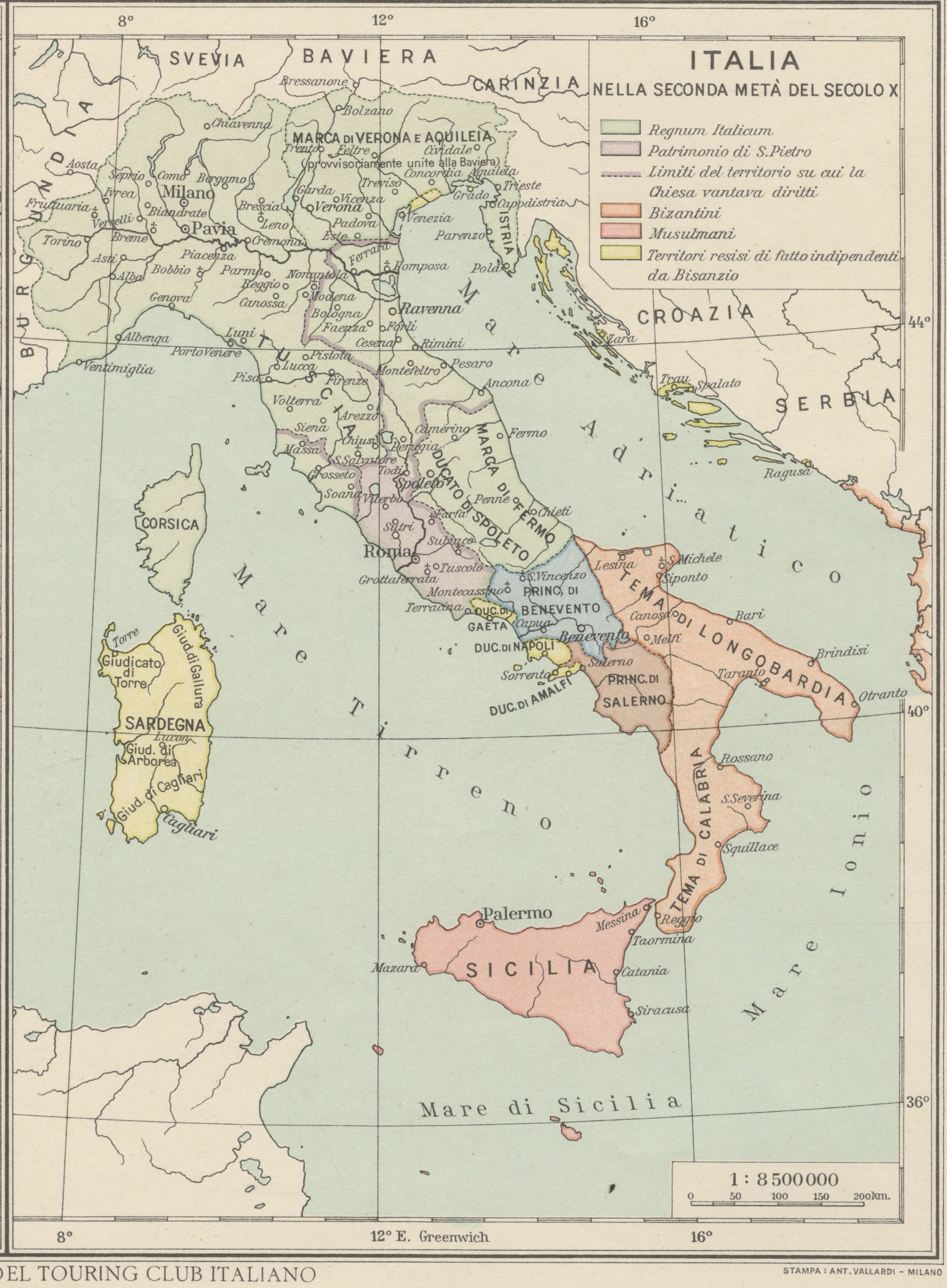
Italy in the second half of 10th century; Marca di Fermo is clearly visible

For his war against the Normans, Pope Leo IX recruited an army from the Holy Roman Empire. Men from the March of Fermo were in his army that was defeated at the Battle of Civitate on 18 June 1053. In 1055, the Emperor Henry III appointed Pope Victor II to the offices of margrave (or marquis) of Fermo and duke of Spoleto. In his capacity as margrave of Fermo, Victor held a placitum at Teramo.

After the death of Victor in 1057, Godfrey the Bearded took control of the March of Fermo and the Duchy of Spoleto. He was already the margrave of Tuscany and his brother was elected Pope Stephen IX to succeed Victor, making him the preeminent power in Italy. In the March of Fermo, however, there was opposition to Godfrey's rule. In the first months of 1059, Pope Nicholas II visited the march in person to place the city of Ancona under interdict.

== Norman incursions ==
The Abruzzo, the coastal region south of Fermo, was considered part of the March of Fermo. By the mid-1070s, the Normans were encroaching on this area. In an agreement reached between Pope Gregory VII and the Norman duke Robert Guiscard at Ceprano in June 1080, the pope refers to "the territory which you now hold unjustly, such as Salerno and Amalfi and part of the March of Fermo". These incursions were among the reasons Gregory gave for excommunicating Guiscard. Prince Jordan of Capua also led invasions into the March of Fermo. His conquests passed to Guiscard on his death.

In 1075, King Henry IV of Germany demanded that Robert do him homage for his lands in Apulia, but the duke responded that he would only do homage for imperial lands. In May 1081, when Henry entered Italy with a small force, Gregory VII was informed that he intending to recruit more troops in the March of Fermo. It seems that he intended to marry his son Conrad to a daughter of Robert Guiscard and to enfeoff the latter with the march, which lay immediately north of Guiscard's duchy and the south of which Guiscard's Normans had already occupied. Nothing came of these plans and in July 1081 Henry IV enfeoffed Rainer II with the March of Fermo and Duchy of Spoleto.

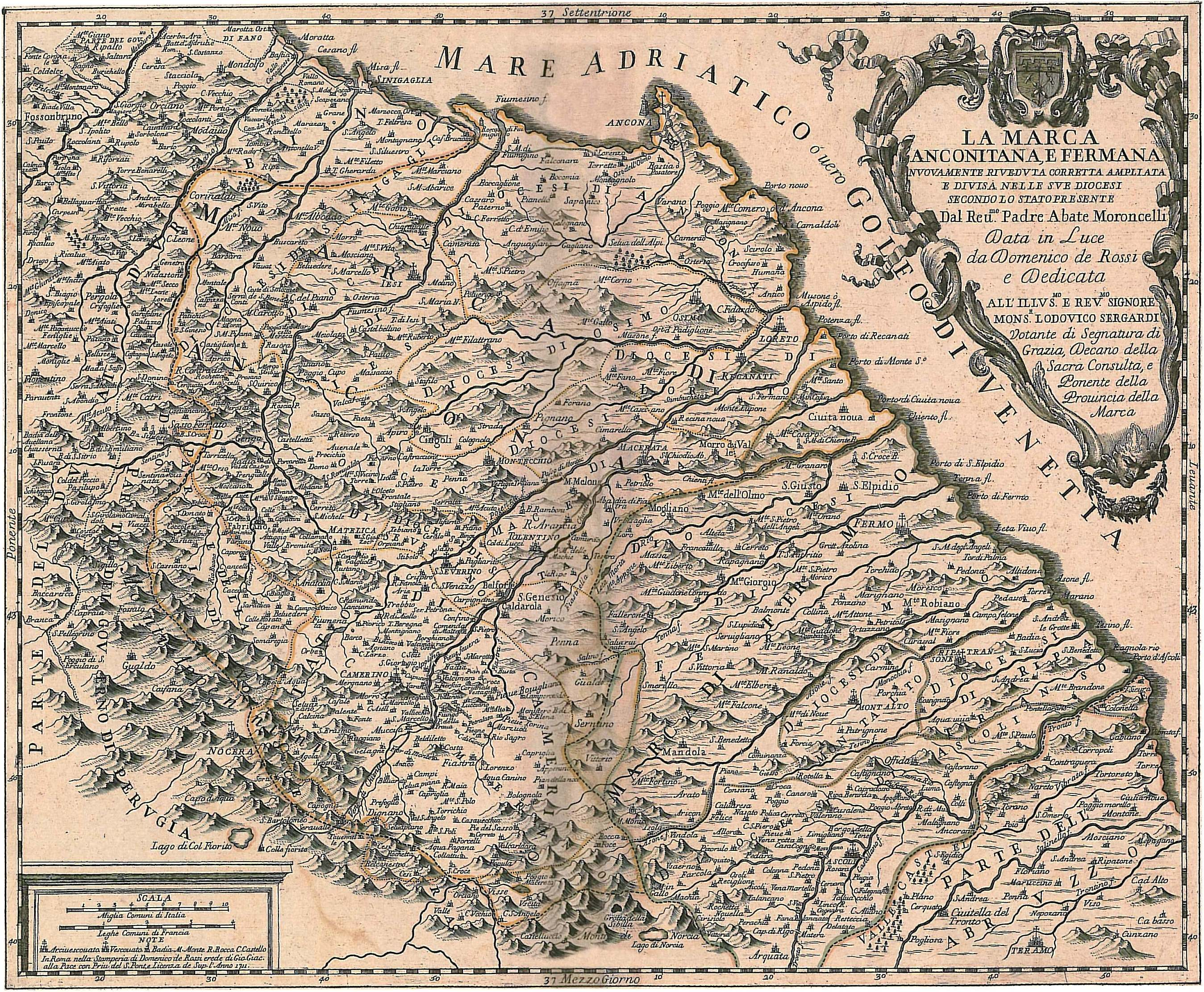
Marches of Ancona and Fermo in 1703

== Merger into the March of Ancona ==
Around 1100, a new formation appears in the records under Rainer's successor, Werner II: the March of Ancona, which was limited to the north of the March of Fermo and the southern Pentapolis. At first this new march took Werner's name as the marca Guarnerii or March of Werner. Werner was also Duke of Spoleto. Ekkehard of Aura describes him as "one of the king's ministeriales, who held the command of the march in the region of Ancona".

On 3 May 1111, Pope Paschal II complained to the Emperor Henry V that the possessions of the Roman See in the March of Fermo—presumably some of them in the hands of the Normans—had not been restored. The March of Fermo was ultimately absorbed into Werner's March of Ancona.

== Bibliography ==
- Bernacchia, Roberto (2006). "Santa Vittoria in Matenano e l'incastellamento nella Marca fermana del X secolo". In Rolando Dondarini (ed.). Farfa, abbazia imperiale: atti del convegno internazionale, Farfa–Santa Vittoria in Matenano, 25–29 agosto 2003. Il Segno dei Gabrielli Editori. pp. 339–356.
- Calasso, Francesco; Pivano, Silvio (1934). "Marca e marchesi". Enciclopedia Italiana. Vol. 22. Istituto dell'Enciclopedia Italiana.
- Curtis, Edmund (1912). Roger of Sicily and the Normans in Lower Italy, 1016–1154. G. P. Putnam's Sons.
- Eads, Valerie (2000). Mighty In War: The Role of Matilda of Tuscany in the War Between Pope Gregory VII and Emperor Henry IV (PhD diss.). City University of New York.
- Partner, Peter (1972). The Lands of St. Peter: The Papal State in the Middle Ages and the Early Renaissance. University of California Press.
- Robinson, Ian S. (2000). Henry IV of Germany. Cambridge University Press.
- Waley, Daniel Philip; Dean, Trevor (2013) [1969]. The Italian City Republics (4th ed.). Routledge.
