= Fulcoald of Farfa =

Italian abbot

Fulcoald (died 757x9) was the fourth Abbot of Farfa from 740. In 739 King Liutprand granted Farfa the right of freedom in abbatial elections, but we do not know if Fulcoald was the product of such a free election or not. Like his predecessor, Lucerius, Fulcoald hailed from Aquitaine, then in southern Francia. "With his abbacy, the quantity of our [historical] evidence dramatically increases [and d]evelopments in secular politics can now be seen to impinge on Farfa's land acquisitions." Fulcoald's abbacy can therefore be defined in terms of three objectives that are apparent in the surviving sources: (a) to extend its landholdings and secure its rights to its properties, (b) to promote a strict and disciplined monastic observance, and (c) to "steer as untroubled a course as possible through the choppy waters of Italian politics".

Italy in Aistulf's time: light blue represents his kingdom, while orange represents the Byzantine Empire. Spoleto, capital of the duchy in which Farfa was located, is shown. The abbey lay not far from the border with the Duchy of Rome.

During the first decade of Fulcoald abbacy he cultivated a close relationship with Duke Lupo of Spoleto, who in turn was a close ally of King Ratchis, a fact which seems to have greatly increased the abbey's patronage by the greater landowners of the Sabina. The notitia (notice) of one of Lupo's judicial decisions in Farfa's favour survives, and we also have record of two disputes settled in the abbey's favour by the missi of Ratchis. Among Lupo's grants to the abbey were large tracts of land and two small monasteries. A high standard of monastic observance was necessary to maintaining high levels of patronage. To this end Fulcoald sought and received a privilege of Duke Lupo prohibiting women from certain grounds in the vicinity of the abbey.

After Aistulf usurped the throne in 751 he removed Lupo and took the region under his direct control. During his reign the patronage of Farfa dwindled. The king granted one estate—"two large tracts of upland pasture"—to Farfa, an estate later disputed with the dukes of Spoleto. Aistulf did not materially harm the abbey, however, in his first year confirming four diplomas from the dukes and another one “deperditum” (forever lost). During this period the abbey received only two gifts from non-royal donors. Despite the apparent loss of patronage the abbey suffered, Aistulf's attitude towards Farfa "was not affected by Fulcoald's origins in the kingdom of his [Aistulf's] enemies."

An indication of Fulcoald's clout comes from an exchange of casalia between the abbey and Bishop Teuto of Rieti in 755. Two charters of exchange (cartae concambiationis) were drawn up, and the surviving one in Farfa's archives shows that the bishop made the exchange with Fulcoald directly and not the abbey.

It may also have been the abbot's clout which got his relative Wandelbert elected to replace him. The Chronicon Farfense of Gregory of Catino puts Fulcoald's death in 759. The latest reference to Fulcoald in a surviving charter is dated October 757. The anonymous Libellus constructionis Farfensis gives his length of abbacy as nineteen years, which coupled with Gregory's catalogue of abbots, which begins Fulcoald's tenure in 740, suggests a date of 759 for his successor. The last mention of Fulcoald's predecessor, however, is June 739. His abbacy may therefore have begun any time after that and it ended some time after October 757.
