= Alan of Farfa =

Aquitanian scholar

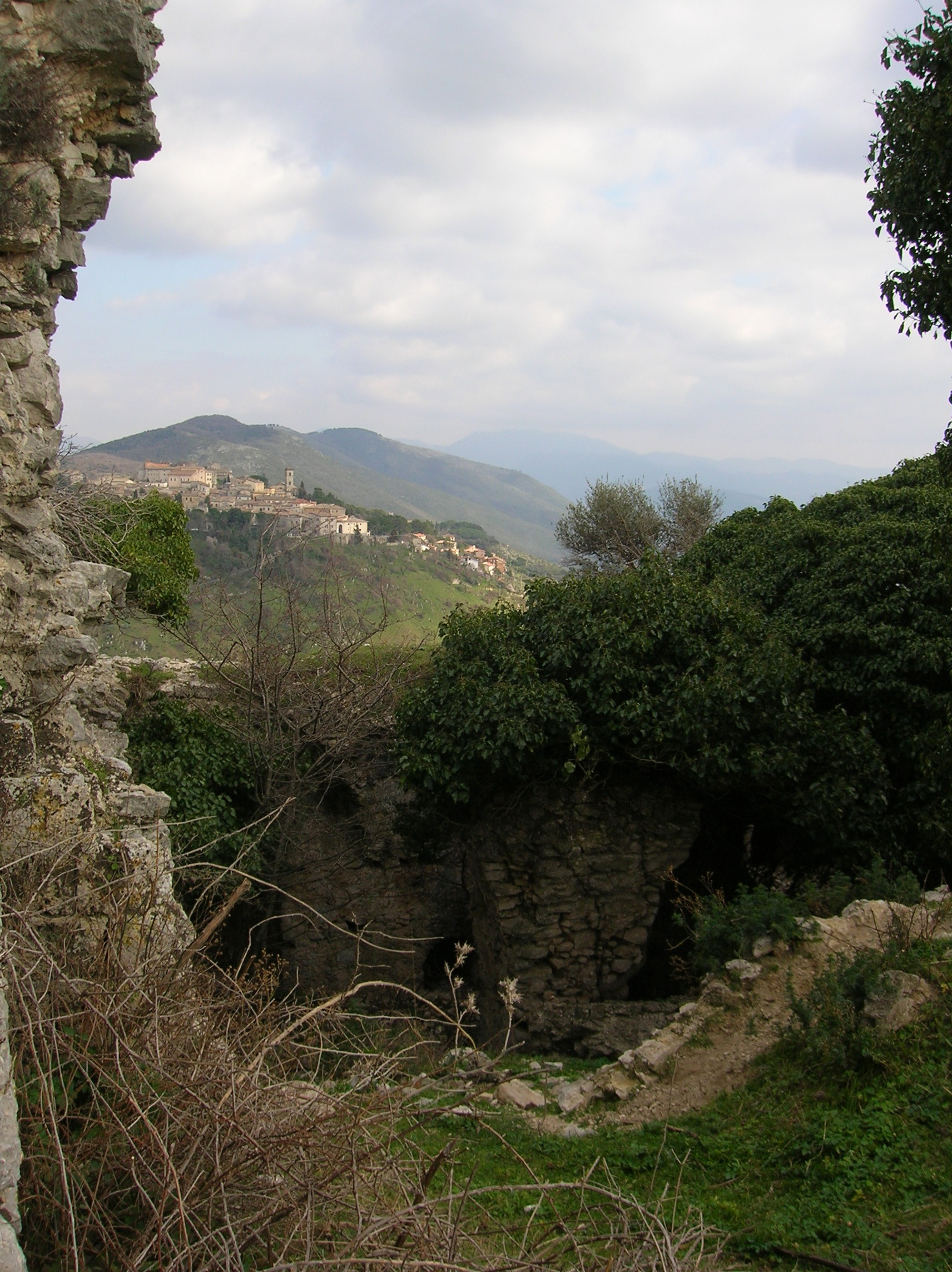
Farfa as seen from the ruins of Saint Martin's oratory, where Alan had his hermitage, on the summit of Monte Acuziano

Alan (died 9 March 769) was an Aquitanian scholar, hermit and homilist who served as the sixth Abbot of Farfa in central Italy from 761. Before taking over at Farfa, Alan composed the Homiliarium Alani, "one of the most successful homiliaries of the late eighth and early ninth centuries", traces of which may be found in the liturgical formulae scattered throughout Farfa's eighth-century charters.

== Biography ==
Alan may have been a native of Aquitaine or perhaps just a member of an Aquitanian family established in the Sabina. There is a charter dating to his tenure as abbot, from January 766, which refers to a certain Teuderisinus as the abbot's avus, that is, grandfather (or perhaps ancestor). This Teuderisinus held land at Rieti and also in the countryside. He gave half of the former, two rural casae, and an undefined property to Farfa sometime before 766. In the charter of January that year a certain Theodosius made an exchange of land at Mallianus with Farfa in which he received the lands formerly granted it by Teuderisinus. If Teuderisinus was indeed the grandfather of Alan, this implies "hitherto undreamt-of mobility and geographical scope among the landowning class, as well as strong and enduring connections between the Sabina and Gaul among the laity as much as the monastic clergy."

According to Gregory of Catino, the eleventh-century historian of Farfa, Alan was elected abbot in 761 to replace the abbot Wandelbert, who was retiring or was forced to do so. According to Gregory, Alan was selected for his moral and intellectual qualities. At the time he was residing in seclusion at a hermitage he had built beside the oratory (oratorium) dedicated to Saint Martin atop Monte Acuziano (Monte San Martino), overlooking the abbey. He would spend much of his abbacy there also. The first contemporary document in which he appears as abbot is dated to January of that year (the fourth indiction).

In the first year of his abbacy Alan brought to an end an ongoing dispute with the local Audualdi family by extracting an oath from Corvillus and purchasing the land Maurus owned at Mallianus, locus of the dispute. During his abbacy Alan also received twelve private donations (including oblations), purchased six properties, and made property exchanges with six others. He also received one promissio (promise of land). The overall picture of his administration is one of continued expansion of the abbey's lands but increased "rationalisation" of what it already held. Alan also received from Duke Theodicius of Spoleto four grants of income and land between 763 and 767. On the first occasion (763) he received the tithes of two curtes; on the second (765) a gualdus; on the third (766) two casae (houses) and a casalis; and on the final occasion (767) some pasture. Alan was otherwise in conflict with the duke, who accused the abbey of encroaching on public land, estates it had in fact received from king Aistulf some years earlier. In 762 king Desiderius confirmed Farfa's entitlement to some other lands it had received from Aistulf. Alan did not or, perhaps of unfamiliarity with local politics was unable to, cultivate a relationship with the king that benefited the abbey, as that between Desiderius and the later abbot Probatus would.

According to Gregory of Catino, Alan died on 9 March 769. On the day of his death, perhaps already senile, he was convinced by a certain Guicpert to appoint him his successor. In the end the monks had to get the king to expel Guicpert and grant the abbey the right to elect a successor. They chose Probatus.

== Works ==
- Alanus de Farfa: Homiliarium Alani, Europeana

== Notes ==
Catholic Church titles
Preceded by Wandelbert	Abbot of Farfa; 761–769	Succeeded by Guicpert
