= Nordepert =

9th century Abbot of Farfa

Nordepert (or Nodepert) was briefly the Abbot of Farfa in 888. He succeeded Teuto and was succeeded by Spento, but the exact dates of these abbacies were unknown as early as the eleventh century, when Gregory of Catino compiled the abbey's history. Nordepert appears to have been elected in the same year as he died.
