= Ingoald =

Ingoald (died 830) was the Abbot of Farfa from 815, succeeding Benedict. At the beginning of his abbacy he vigorously protested the policies of Pope Leo III (795–816), which had resulted in the abbey's loss of property. Ingoald complained about not only the—illegitimate, as he saw it—seizure of Farfa's lands, but also the application of dubious laws of Roman origin in a zone that followed Lombard law. While Ingoald also fostered close contacts with the Carolingian rulers of Francia and Lombardy, he resisted secular encroachments on the abbey's privileges as staunchly as he resisted papal ones. The rate of property transactions at Farfa seems to have peaked under Ingoald, but the surviving documentary evidence is far from complete.

In 817 Pope Stephen IV issued a bull claiming that Farfa's lands lay within the Papal patrimonium sabinense (Sabine patrimony) and under Papal ius (jurisdiction), and that therefore the abbey owed the Holy See an annual rent (pensio) of ten gold solidi. Hoping to recover Farfa's lost territories, Ingoald agreed to pay the pensio. When the lands were not returned, he sent a complaint to King Lothair I that the monastery was "constrained under tribute and payment to the Roman pontiffs" and its lands "violently taken away". In 824, on the occasion of the promulgation of the Constitutio Romana, the king and his father, the Emperor Louis I, responded with a privilege for Farfa. In the next pontificate, that of Paschal I (817–24), this claim to an annual rent was withdrawn, but in January 829 Farfa's advocate, Audolf, accused Leo III and the earlier Adrian II of having invaded the monastery's properties with force. By the time of this tribunal, held in the presence of imperial missi dominici and Pope Gregory IV in the Basilica of Saint John Lateran, the complaint of payment had been dropped, so the imperial privilege seems to have had its intended effect. Although Ingoald presented charters from Duke Theodicius of Spoleto and Queen Ansa with confirmations from King Desiderius and Charlemagne, and the tribunal found in Farfa's favour, Gregory IV "refused to do anything" (facere noluit).

Ingoald was succeeded by Sichard.
