= Vitalis of Farfa =

Vitalis (Italian: Vitale) was the "surrogate" Abbot of Farfa in 888, between the death of Spento and the election of the long-serving Peter. The history of the period in Farfa's history, besides the barest chronological outline, has been obscure since it was first written down, by Gregory of Catino in the late eleventh century.
