= Altpert =

Altpert (died 790) was the Abbot of Farfa from the death of Ragambald in 786 until his own death a few years later. He was described by Gregory of Catino, writing some three centuries later, as having been born in Paris "of the Gauls" (Galliarum), presumably meaning that he was a Romance-speaking subject of the Carolingians. He increased the patronage of the abbey compared to his predecessor, but Farfa was still less successful in seeking out grants and donations than it had been under the local abbot Probatus. Altpert received a donation of lands at Rabenno from Duke Hildeprand of Spoleto, two other donations and one oblation.
