= Fulcoald =

Fulcoald is a Germanic masculine given name. Notable people with the name include:

- Fulcoald of Farfa (died 750s), abbot between 740 and 759
- Fulcoald of Rouergue, count between 820 and 837
