= Benedict of Farfa =

Italian Abbot in the Early Middle Ages

Benedict (died 815) was the Abbot of Farfa, Italy from 802 until his death. He is the first abbot mentioned in the eleventh-century history of the abbey written by Gregory of Catino whose origins were not known.

Benedict continued the policy of his predecessor of expanding Farfa's landed endowments. Nevertheless, according to the forensic testimony of his successor, Ingoald, the monastery lost property during the reign of Pope Leo III (795–816), partly from the unlawful seizures of the Holy See.

Two charters from 802 and 804 show that Benedict and his predecessor Mauroald financed the military service of two brothers from the Sabina, Probatus and Picco, sons of Ursus of the Pandoni family, who were serving the army of Charlemagne then targeting the Principality of Benevento. In 804 they defaulted on their debt to the abbey of twenty gold mancuses, ten pounds of silver, and cloth worth sixty mancuses. They ceded all their wealth to the abbey save their lands in Fermo, a few movables and their slaves.
