= Teuto =

9th-century Italian abbot

Teuto (Italian: Teutone) was the Abbot of Farfa from about 883 until about 888. His abbacy is the first of a very unclear string that covers the years down to 919 at Farfa. He is known to have succeeded Anselm and been succeeded by Nordepert, but little else is certain. The period of his abbacy had already become obscure when Gregory of Catino was chronicling the abbey's history and editing its charters in the late eleventh century.

Suppose he succeeded at Farfa on 12 May 883, as one nineteenth-century authority has it. In that case, it is most probably he who received a "privilege of greatest freedom" (praeceptum optimae libertatis) and a grant of various properties from Emperor Charles the Fat that year. This, the last Carolingian grant to Farfa, is dated only to the year and does not name the abbot. It may have been Anselm. Charles' chief concern seems to have been the depredations of the Duke Guy II of Spoleto and other "evil men" (pravi homines) then in rebellion against him. He granted several similar (temporarily successful) privileges to other central Italian institutions in the summer of 883 during the height of the challenge to his authority.
