= Hugh of Farfa =

Hugh (died 1039) was the Abbot of Farfa from 998. He founded the abbatial school and wrote its history from the late ninth through the early eleventh century under the title Destructio monasterii Farfensis ("The Destruction of the Monastery of Farfa"). A later student of his school, Gregory of Catino, wrote a fuller history of the monastery partly based on Hugh's earlier account.

The Destructio Hugh wrote begins where an earlier, and not completely preserved work, the Libellus constructionis Farfensis, left off, with the death of Abbot Hilderic in 857. His purpose in chronicling the history of the abbey in this period, which includes the Saracen assault on the monastery and the dispersal of the monks under Abbot Peter in 897/8, was to introduce the Cluniac reform there. Hugh castigates the monks for their decadence and corruption following their return to the abbey after the Saracen occupation, but by the time he had taken up the post of abbot, he wrote, "there was not found in all the Kingdom of Italy a similar monastery in any respect, save the monastery called Nonantola." By this time the monastery was under the control of the Ottonian emperors.

Ildefonso Schuster researched Hugh extensively and published a book about him.
