= Spento =

Spento (Italian: Spentone) was the Abbot of Farfa following the very brief abbacy of Nordepert in 888. As early as the next year (889), he was replaced by Vitalis, sometimes considered a surrogate abbot. During his brief tenure he reportedly acquired many lands for the abbey.
