= Wandelbert of Farfa =

Abbot of Farfa

Wandelbert was the Abbot of Farfa sometime between 757 and 761, one of a series of abbots from Aquitaine. His abbacy coincided with a troubled period in the abbey's history and the stormy reign of Duke Gisulf of Spoleto, who seems to have brought some stability to the abbey by the time of his death.

The previous abbot, Fulcoald, a relative of Wandelbert's, is last mentioned in a charter of October 757, although two later sources taken together place the end of his abbacy in 759. His abbacy is said to have last one year and seven months before he retired to become abbot of the quieter monastery of Saint Hippolytus in Fermo, perhaps because of illness. Saint Hippolytus was recent acquisition of Farfa's, confirmed by King Desiderius only a year after Wandelbert's arrival.

If the date of the inception of Wandelbert's leadership at Farfa and its duration are correct, then he must have been incapable of exercising his authority in April 760, when a monk named Raginfred was acting on behalf of the abbey. It is more probable that Wandelbert had retired—or been forced into retirement—by this point. Wandelbert's successor at Farfa, the former hermit and fellow Aquitainian Alan, began his abbacy in January 761.
