= Libellus constructionis Farfensis =

The Libellus constructionis Farfensis ("Little Book of the Construction of Farfa"), often referred to simply as the Constructio in context, is a written history of the Abbey of Farfa from its foundation by Thomas of Maurienne circa 700 until the death of Abbot Hilderic in 857. It is about the "construction" of a powerful abbey with vast landholdings. It was used as a source for two later histories, which are basically continuations: the Destructio monasterii Farfensis of Abbot Hugh (died 1039) and the Chronicon Farfense by Gregory of Catino (died 1133).

The surviving Libellus is fragmentary, and appears only in one eleventh-century lectionary from Farfa, now in the Biblioteca Nazionale Centrale di Roma, but which was probably not the Libellus which Hugh and Gregory worked from. The Libellus partly relies on the earlier Vita of the founders of San Vincenzo al Volturno by its abbot Autpert Ambrose (770s). It also records the epitaph of Abbot Sichard (died 842), which was only re-discovered in 1959, but which authenticated the Libellus. Although the anonymous author was apparently a good copyist, it is impossible to properly assess his historical accuracy for many details he chronicles, but a comparison with the Regestum Farfense (a massive register of Farfa's charters, compiled by Gregory of Catino) shows that his outlines are correct.
