= Lucerius =

Lucerius (died 740) was the third Abbot of Farfa, succeeding Aunepert in 724 at the latest. He was originally from Provence and had been raised at Farfa by Thomas of Maurienne, the first abbot. Lucerius' abbacy was a period of growth and expansion on the part of the abbey. In his first year, he received a grant of a church with its (unspecified) lands from Duke Thrasimund II of Spoleto. This church, dedicated to Saint Getulius, lay within the jurisdiction of the Diocese of Rieti, and according to the tenth-century Exceptio Relationum Thrasimund had to compensate the bishop for his loss.

In 739 Lucerius received a privilege from King Liutprand confirming its possessions and granting it the freedom to elect its own abbots. In 729 Thrasimund had sworn loyalty to Liutprand, but in this year (739) he had renounced it. Liutprand marched an army into central Italy, forcing Thrasimund to flee to Rome and installing Hilderic as duke in Spoleto. The next year (740), with the aid of Pope Zachary, Thrasimund retook Spoleto and granted Farfa the right to graze its animals on the pasture of the settlement of Germaniciana and also granted it the tithes of that place.
