= Aunepert =

8th century abbot

Aunepert (died c. 724) was the second Abbot of Farfa, holding office from the death of the monastery's founder, Thomas of Maurienne (c. 720), until his own death a few years later. Little is known of Aunepert save that he was from Toulouse, then in the Merovingian kingdom of Aquitaine. By 724 he had been succeeded as abbot by Lucerius when Duke Transamund II of Spoleto granted "a church and its lands" to Farfa.
