= San Pellegrino, Viterbo =

Parish church in Viterbo, Italy

San Pellegrino
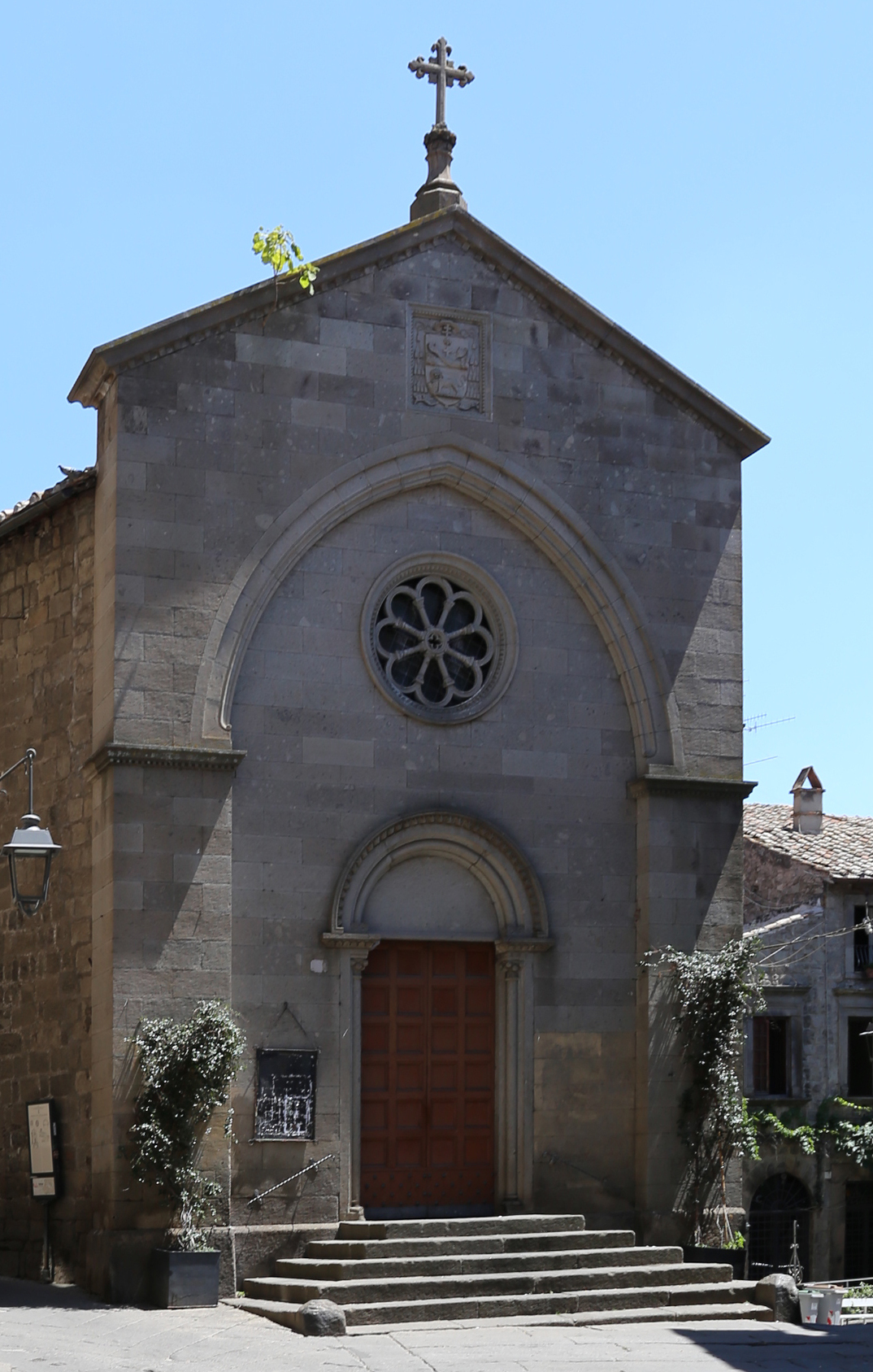
- Façade of San Pellegrino

Religion
- Affiliation: Roman Catholic

Location
- Location: Piazza San Pellegrino, Viterbo, Lazio, Italy
- Interactive map of San Pellegrino
- Coordinates: 42.41374°N 12.10565°E

Architecture
- Type: Church
- Style: Gothic

San Pellegrino is a reconstructed Gothic-style, Roman Catholic church located in the piazza of the same name in central Viterbo, region of Lazio, Italy. The church stands across from the medieval Palazzo degli Alessandri.

== History ==
A church of this name is mentioned in documents from 1045, under the jurisdiction of Benedictine monks from the Abbey of San Martino al Cimino. However, even by the early 20th-century, the church had undergone substantial refurbishments. Allied bombardments nearly razed the church, and the latest reconstruction altered the apse and has created the present sparse interiors.

In 1889 Bishop Antonio Maria Grasselli patronized the reconstruction of the façade: creating the atypical combination of a rounded, almost Romanesque portal, surmounted by a rose window. The interior has traces of medieval frescoes. The main altarpiece is a copy (1979) of a San Pellegrino and Angels by Vincenzo Strigelli, destroyed during the bombing.
