= Abbey of San Martino al Cimino =

Coordinates: 42.3676°N 12.1281°E

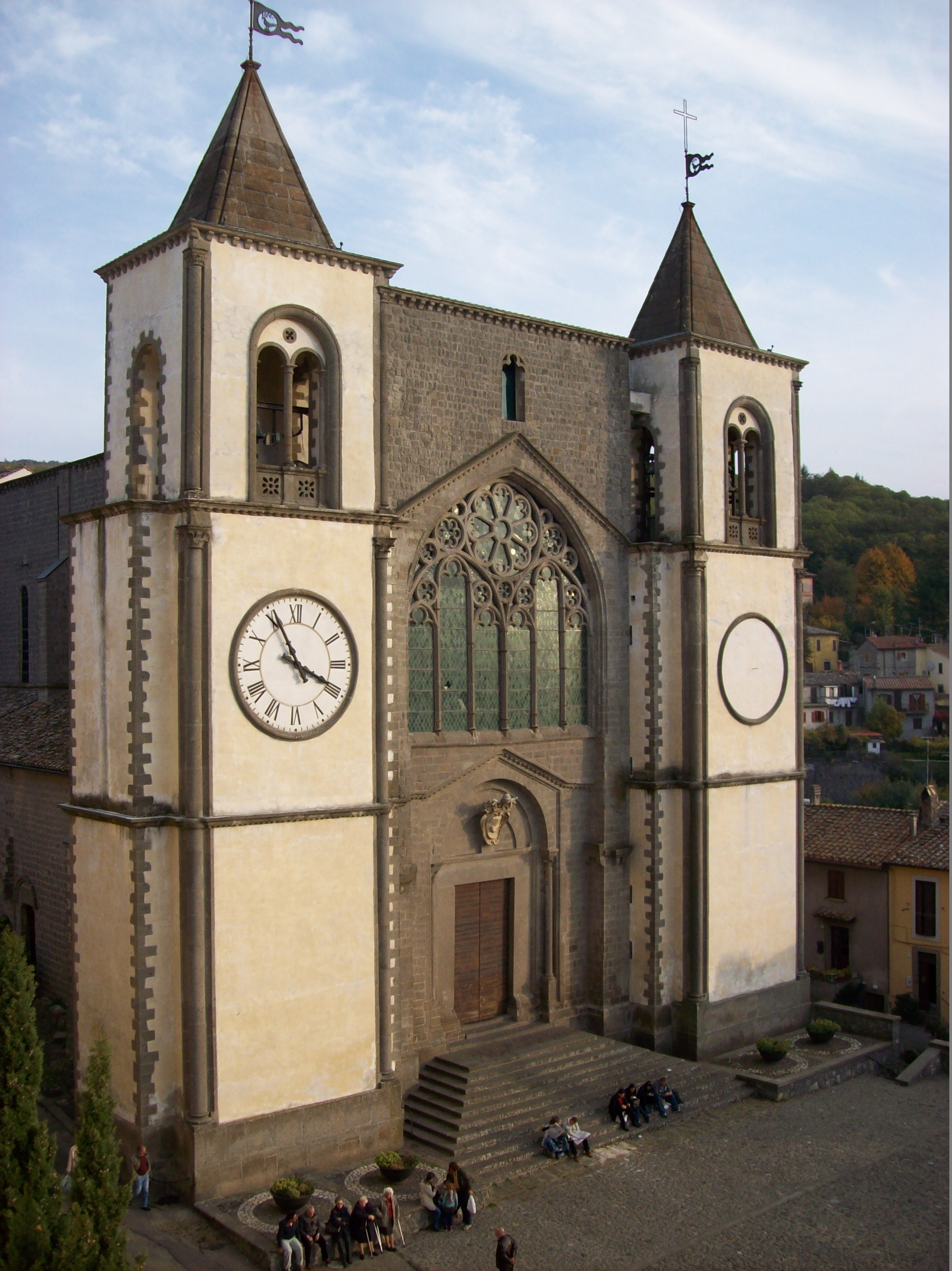
Abbey church today

The Abbey of San Martino al Cimino (or San Martino in Monte) is a former monastery on the northwest slopes of the Monti Cimini. It was a Cistercian territorial abbey between the 13th and 16th centuries. The buildings are located at an elevation of 580 metres (1,900 ft), 4 miles (6.4 km) outside of Viterbo.

A church dedicated to Saint Martin in the Monti Cimini existed by 833 (or 838), when a certain Benedict, son of Anspert, gave it to Abbot Sichard of Farfa. By 1045, it had its own abbot and followed the Benedictine rule, like its mother house. It was abandoned shortly after 1122 as Farfa went into decline.

In 1150, Pope Eugene III gave the site to the Cistercians of the Abbey of Saint-Sulpice. Its holdings were insufficient to provide a living for the monks and in 1206 the general chapter of the Cistercian Order admonished the abbot of Saint-Sulpice to provide more support. In 1207, Pope Innocent III convinced the abbot to renounce Saint-Sulpice's control of San Martino al Cimino to its own mother house, the Abbey of Pontigny. Abbot Peter of Pontigny personally led a large contingent of monks from Pontigny to San Martino.

The 13th century was the high point for San Martino. It had properties throughout the Patrimony of Saint Peter and was the largest monastery in Roman Tuscia. It became a territorial abbey, its abbots exercising episcopal jurisdiction within their own lands. Construction began around 1225 on a new church and new cloisters, completed only after 1400. The church was consecrated around 1230. In 1254, Cardinal Gil Torres made a generous bequest to the abbey. The commune of Viterbo frequently elected monks from San Martino for the office of chamberlain. The abbey owned the church of San Pellegrino in the city.

In the 14th century, the abbey went into decline. In 1378, it was placed in commendam. By 1442, its community consisted of the abbot and two monks. A village had, however, developed around it, today San Martino al Cimino. In 1564, the Cistercian abbey came to an end. Cardinal Ranuccio Farnese renounced the commendatory abbacy and Pope Pius IV entrusted its pastoral responsibilities to the Chapter of Saint Peter.

In 1645, Pope Innocent X place it under the patronage of the Pamphili family. They renovated the abbey church in the Baroque style, demolished many other buildings and built a palace for themselves on the land. In 1911–1915, its original Gothic form was restored. On the main façade, the rose window is original, but the campaniles were added in the 14th century. Since 1936, the title of abbot of San Martino al Cimino is held by the bishop of Viterbo.

== Works cited ==
- Linehan, Peter (1971). The Spanish Church and the Papacy in the Thirteenth Century. Cambridge University Press.
- Olivieri, S. (2003). "San Martino al Monte Cimino, Abbey of". New Catholic Encyclopedia. Vol. 12: Ref–Sep (2nd ed.). Gale. p. 654.
- Rava, Eleonora (2013). "On the Trail of Religious in the Medieval Communes of Viterbo and Tuscia". In Frances Andrewes (ed.). Churchmen and Urban Government in Late Medieval Italy, c. 1200–c. 1450: Cases and Contexts. Cambridge University Press. pp. 201–218.
- Stendardi, Attilio (2000). "San Martino al Cimino". In André Vauchez (ed.). Encyclopedia of the Middle Ages. Vol. 2. Translated by Adrian Walford. Fitzroy Dearborn. p. 1298.
