= Probatus =

Probatus (Italian: Provato) was the Abbot of Farfa from 770 until 781, and the first abbot native to the Sabina. He steered the abbey through the fall of the Kingdom of the Lombards, trying to prevent the disastrous aggression of its last king, and kept it from falling under the jurisdiction of either the Papacy or the Papal States. With the benefit of his local connections he oversaw a great expansion of the abbey's properties through grants and purchases, and also rationalised its holdings to create a robust base for an early medieval monastic community.

== Early abbacy (770–72) ==
According to the Libellus constructionis Farfensis, a late ninth-century source, Probatus was "born in the Sabine province" and "fully educated from childhood in the chant of the holy Roman Church", that is, the Old Roman chant. He was a deacon of Farfa in 769, when Abbot Alan died and was replaced by his chosen successor, Guicpert. The latter's abbacy was opposed by the monks, who petitioned King Desiderius to intervene. The king expelled the interloper and confirmed the abbey's right to elect its abbots. In late February or early March 770 the community chose one of their own: Probatus.

Probatus' familiarity with local politics made him a superior choice compared with the foreigners who had served as Farfa's abbots prior. He immediately attracted royal patronage: by 772 the abbey had received three curtes (some type of house) and one monasteria (a church with a monastic community) that had previously belonged to Queen Ansa, a gift to her from her son, Adelchis. Probatus also succeeded in attracting private donors (that is, not the Dukes of Spoleto). During his tenure Farfa secured thirty donations, more than three-quarters of which were gifts outright. He also received from private citizens one confirmatio (confirmation of a prior acquisition) and one promissio (promise of a future donation in land), and increased Farfa's lands by purchasing private property on one occasion and exchanging it on four others to rationalise the abbey's holdings. In 772 Desiderius, who had up to that point been acting as Duke of Spoleto, bestowed that office on Theodicius, who proceeded to make a grant to Farfa.

== Farfa and the fall of the Lombard kingdom (773–74) ==
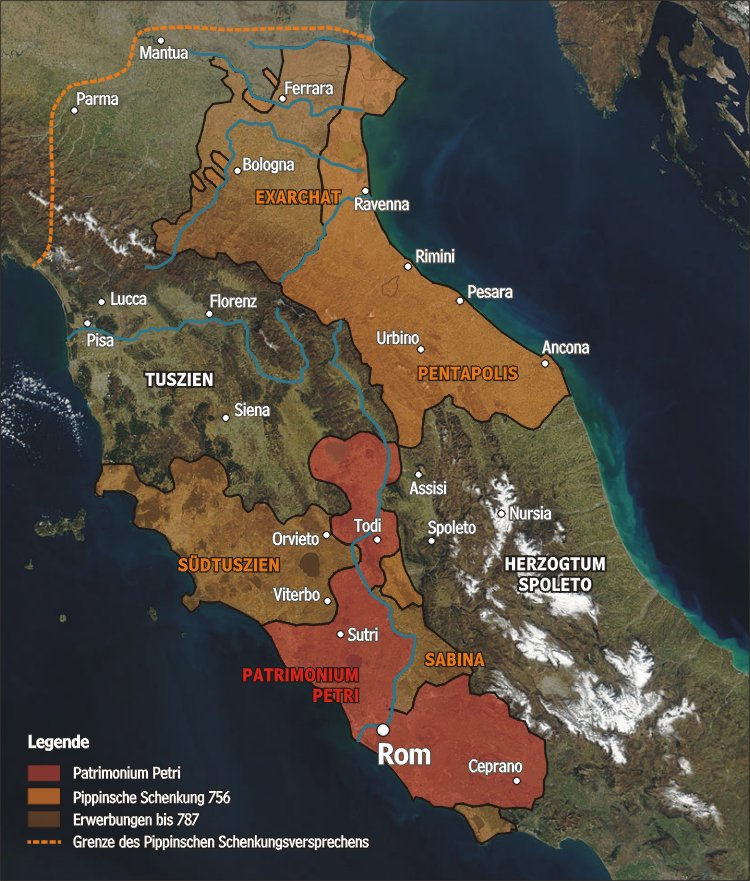
Map of the Papal States indicating the Duchy of Spoleto and the Sabina.

Probatus may also have been the beneficiary of a famine that struck Italy in 774–75, and caused an increase in the charitable donations. Likewise the threat of war may have influenced Duke Hildeprand of Spoleto to procure divine favour or vouchsafe his land to God by donating it to the abbey. The charters of three grants the duke made to Farfa credit the monks with suggesting them, a sign of Probatus' gift for diplomacy.

In 773, before April, Desiderius was pressuring Rome with his army when Pope Hadrian I sent a delegation led by Probatus and twenty of his senior monks to deal with the king. The purpose of this expedition was to procure the return of some cities which had been captured from the Duchy of Rome (which lay outside Desiderius' kingdom); it was the purpose of another papal delegation later that year to receive the cities, which, however, Desiderius did not agree to return. Probatus' embassy can be viewed as an effort, ultimately unsuccessful, to preserve the political order and its peace ("to save Desiderius from himself [since] many in the duchy [of Spoleto] did not share the Lombard king's confidence in his own military strength"). In 774 Italy fell to Charlemagne, king of the Franks, after a successful siege of the capital, Pavia, and Desiderius was taken into captivity.

== Securing immunity and independence (775–78) ==
Probatus was the first Italian abbot to get confirmation of his abbey's holdings and of its spiritual immunity (from secular and prelatical authority) from the Frankish king. In order to obtain these privileges it was necessary for Probatus to travel to the Frankish court at Quierzy in 775. There, in his royal villa, Charlemagne issued his first privilege for Farfa on 22 May, exempting it from episcopal jurisdiction and confirming its freedom of abbatial election. A second privilege was issued on 29 May granting it spiritual immunities. Probatus returned to Farfa in January 776 and a flood of donations to the abbey, now patronised by the most powerful ruler in western Europe, followed. The years 776–78 were the most fruitful in the early development of Farfa's territory. In those years Farfa received seven grants from Duke Hildeprand, who had been confirmed in his position by Charlemagne.

The confirmation of spiritual immunity was important at the time, since Farfa was dealing with its first recorded jurisdictional dispute with the Papacy. According to the Libellus constructionis Farfensis, Pope Hadrian had ordered that disputes between Farfa and some men from Rome be settled by his prior vestiarius, Miccio. This was a secular official pertaining to the secular offices the Papacy had acquired in the Duchy of Rome. The pope's letter to Probatus of 22 April 772, referring to the abbot's allegations of "many evils" (plura mala) committed against Farfa by some Romans, admits that the infractors hailed from "our Roman republic" (nostra Romanorum reipublica, lit. “republic of the Romans”) and is dated by the joint reign of the Byzantine emperors Constantine V and Leo IV.

In 777–78 Probatus was able to construct a three-kilometre aqueduct for the abbey by convincing landowners to make pro anima gifts (for the sake of the soul) of the requisite land.
