= Peter of Farfa =

9th and 10th century abbot

Peter (died c. 919) was the long-serving Abbot of Farfa from about 890 until his death. He replaced the interim abbot Vitalis. His abbacy marked the return of stability after a period which saw four abbots in the space of two years.

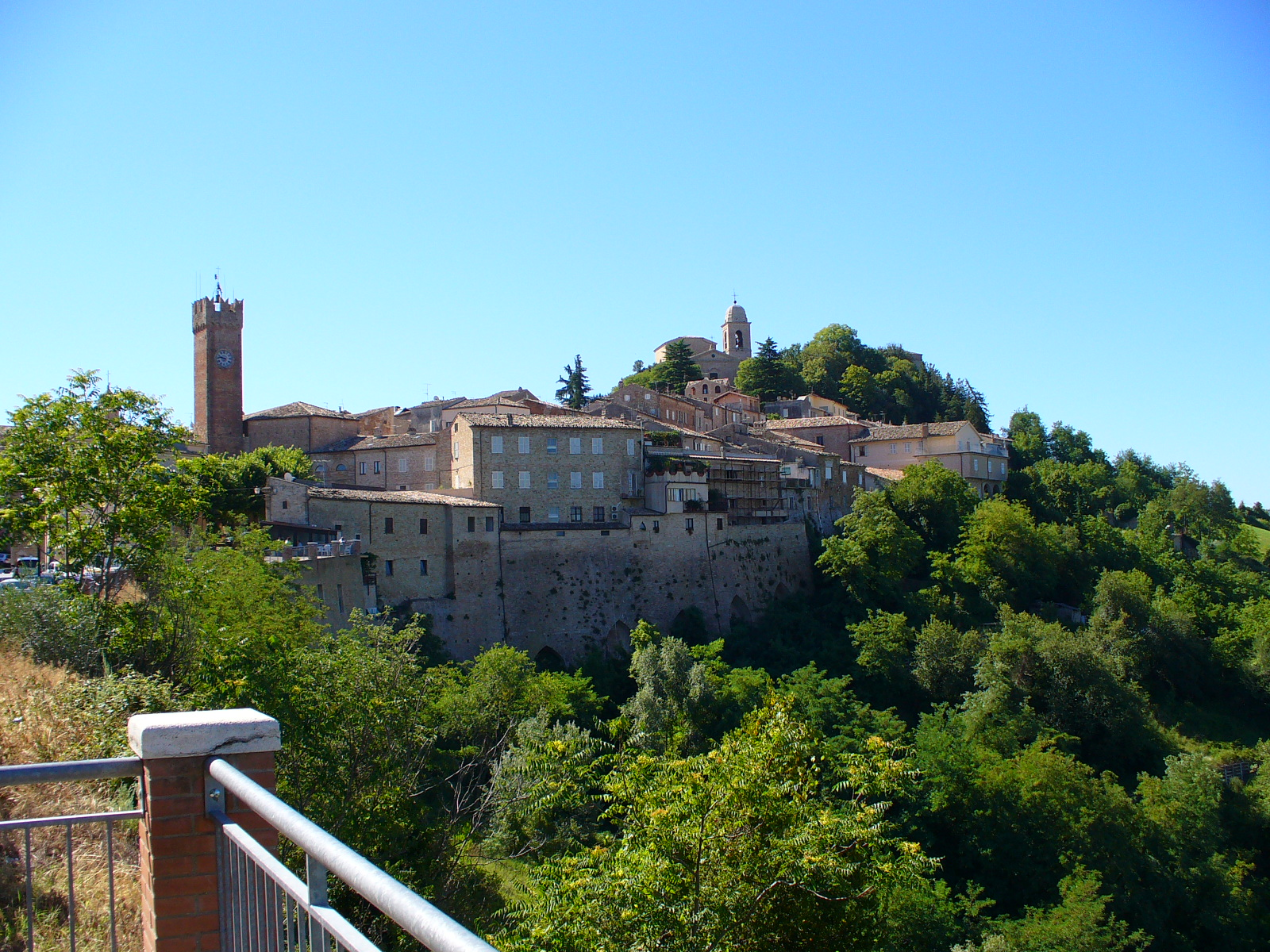
Santa Vittoria in Matenano

In 897, Farfa was attacked and sacked, presumably by Saracens, who had begun to settle in south and central Italy and systematically plunder the countryside. An account of these events, the Destructio monasterii Farfensis, was written by the early eleventh-century abbot Hugh. He records "the properties of our monastery, which were given mercifully by the pious, [were] dispersed cruelly by the impious [through] evil destruction". His vague wording allows that at least some of the raiders were locals and not Saracens.

Under Peter's direction, the monks of Farfa fled, some to Rome and others to Rieti. The abbey buildings were used as a barracks by the Saracens at first, but in 898 they were accidentally burnt down. The abbey's treasures were rescued by the monks, and its library and archive were brought by Peter and a few others to the church of Saint Hippolytus in Fermo. He soon had them moved again to the castle of Santa Vittoria in Monte Matenano. In the late eleventh century, the Farfese monk Gregory of Catino records that many documents were missing from the abbey's archives; these were probably lost during the itinerant period after 897. The books and documents did not return to Farfa until around 930, after Peter's death.
