= Guicpert =

Guicpert or Wigbert (died before 781) was the abbot of Farfa for eleven months in 769–770 and the bishop of Rieti in 778.

According to the twelfth-century chronicler of the abbey, Gregory of Catino, Wigbert was an Englishman and already a bishop when he convinced the dying Abbot Alan of Farfa to name him as his successor. From a twelfth-century perspective, Wigbert's accession was invalid because it was not in accordance with the Rule of Saint Benedict, although that rule was neither strictly nor uniformly enforced at Farfa in the eighth century. Nevertheless, the monks found Wigbert's rule a "tyranny" (in Gregory's words) and sought the king, Desiderius, to remove him and confirm their freedom to elect a successor, which he did.

Nothing is known about Wigbert between February 770 and April 778, but in the latter month the bishop of Rieti, named Guicpert in the source, received for the duration of his life the church of Saint Michael in Rieti from Hildeprand, Duke of Spoleto. This church had long been disputed between the dukes and the bishops, but the grant to Guicpert, which stated that the church was to revert to Farfa on his death, did not end the disputes. Hildeprand's grant included a canal by the river Velino conditional on the construction of a mill. Guicpert's predecessor, Sinuald, had been bishop as late as March 777. By July 781, when a judicial decision of Charlemagne placed the church under the control of Farfa, Guicpert was dead.
