= Thomas of Maurienne =

Italian abbot (fl. 680-700)

An imaginary portrait of Thomas of Maurienne.

Thomas of Maurienne (died before 720) was the first abbot of the Abbey of Farfa, which he founded between 680 and c.700. Although the sources of his life are much later, and he is surrounded by legends, his historicity is beyond doubt.

Thomas is said to have hailed from Maurienne, where he was a monk before he travelled to Italy. According to the twelfth-century Chronicon Farfense of Gregory of Catino, Thomas was on a pilgrimage when in the Church of the Holy Sepulchre, he had a vision of the Virgin Mary, who told him to go to Italy and re-establish an abandoned basilica that had been founded in her name. With a small group of disciples and divine guidance, Thomas found the ruins of a basilica in a deserted region in the Sabina. The reliability of this story is thrown in some doubt by the extensive use of topoi, such as the vision, the pilgrimage, the desert and "the reoccupation of an earlier Christian site". It was believed in Thomas's day that the basilica had been founded in the sixth century by a certain Laurence of Syria, about whom nothing concrete is known. The church certainly stands on a terrace excavated in Late Antiquity and archaeological digs by the British School at Rome (1978–85) have uncovered a late antique wall enclosure on the site, although the church itself has not been excavated.

During Thomas's abbacy, three monks from Farfa established the monastery of San Vincenzo al Volturno. According to San Vincenzo's historian Ambrosius Autpert, in his Chronicon Vulturnense, it was Thomas who directed the monks to "the oratory of Christ's martyr Vincent [where] on each side of the river is a thick forest (silva densissima) which serves as a habitation for wild beasts and a hiding-place for robbers." Also during Thomas's tenure the abbey received a privilege from Pope John VII in 705, which also recognised that the abbey was founded by "Bishop Laurence". This Papal privilege (privilegium) included a confirmation of the abbey's first (undatable) grant of land, from Duke Faroald II of Spoleto. The charter refers only vaguely to lands which were apparently demesne, quoting a letter the Pope had received from Faroald. (Gregory made an effort to identify the extent of this donation by looking to oral sources, and he quoted "very old venerable elders, with true testimony related to them by their predecessors" who equated Faroald's donation to eleven curtes of about 11,000 modia in total.) Through his donations Faroald claimed to have "restored that place through Abbot Thomas and your [Papal] recommendation (commenditum)", thus placing the initiative in the original land grant with the Pope. Faroald seems to have desired the Pope to confirm—or "strengthen" (firmare) by exercise of his spiritual powers, namely, the "chain of anathema"—Faroald's own conditions of the grant. The Pope went further, he "established and decided" (statuimus et decernimus) that nobody should place any exactions on the abbey and he severely limited the role of the "neighbouring bishop" (vicinum aepiscopum). Thomas was ordered to put the Papal privilege on display.

According to the eleventh-century martyrology of the abbey, the Martyrologium Pharphense, Thomas was buried at the thirtieth milestone, as later was Abbot Hilderic (died 857). Thomas had been succeeded by Aunepert by 720.
