= Farfa Abbey =

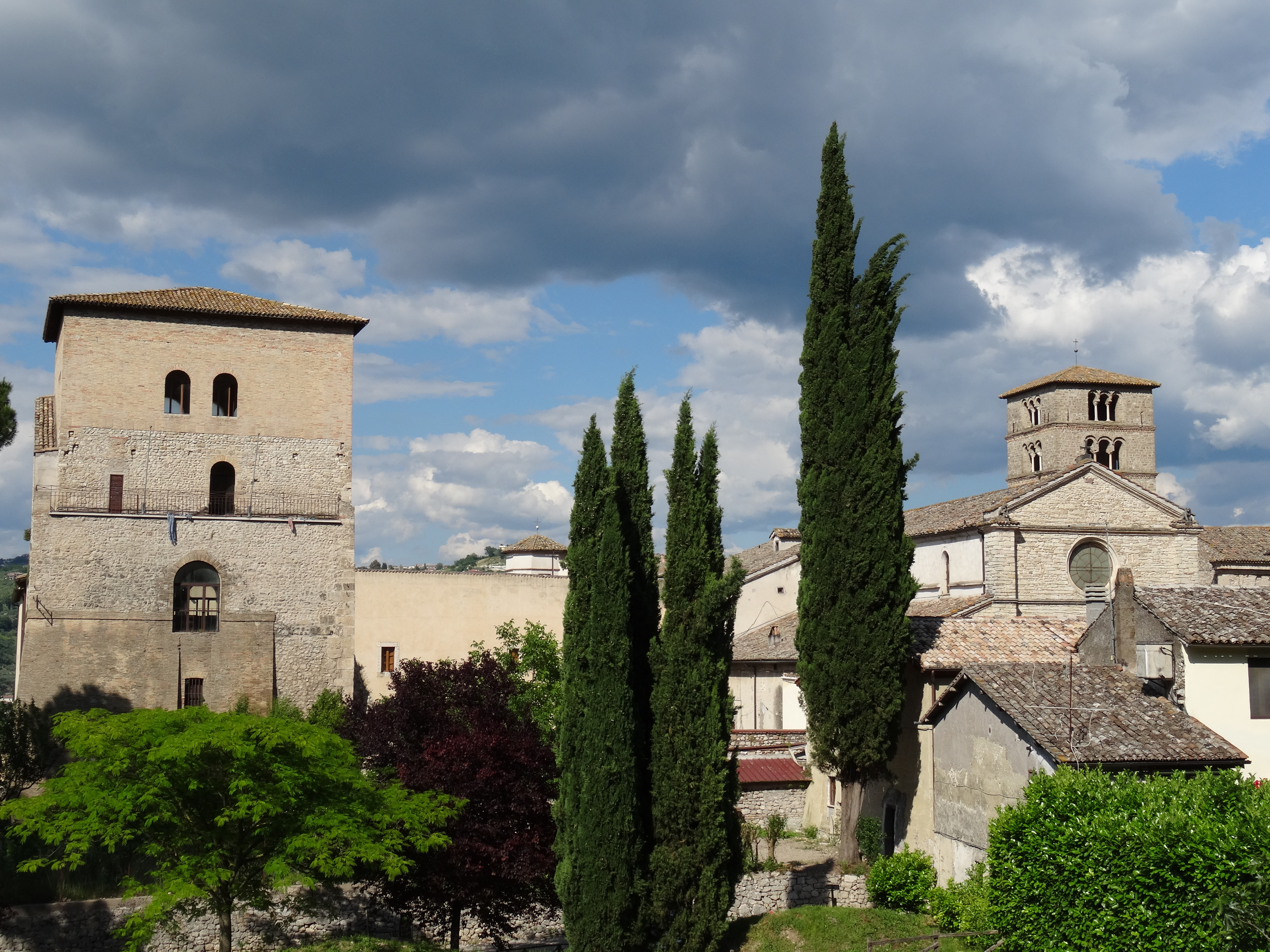
- View of the Abbey
- Farfa Abbey
- 42°13′16.66″N 12°43′7.27″E
- Location: Farfa, Fara in Sabina
- Country: Italy
- Denomination: Roman Catholic
- Website: Official website

History
- Status: Territorial abbey
- Dedication: Holy Mary

Architecture
- Functional status: Active
- Architectural type: Church
- Style: Carolingian, Baroque
- Completed: 913

Administration
- Province: Rieti
- Diocese: Rieti

Farfa
- Frazione
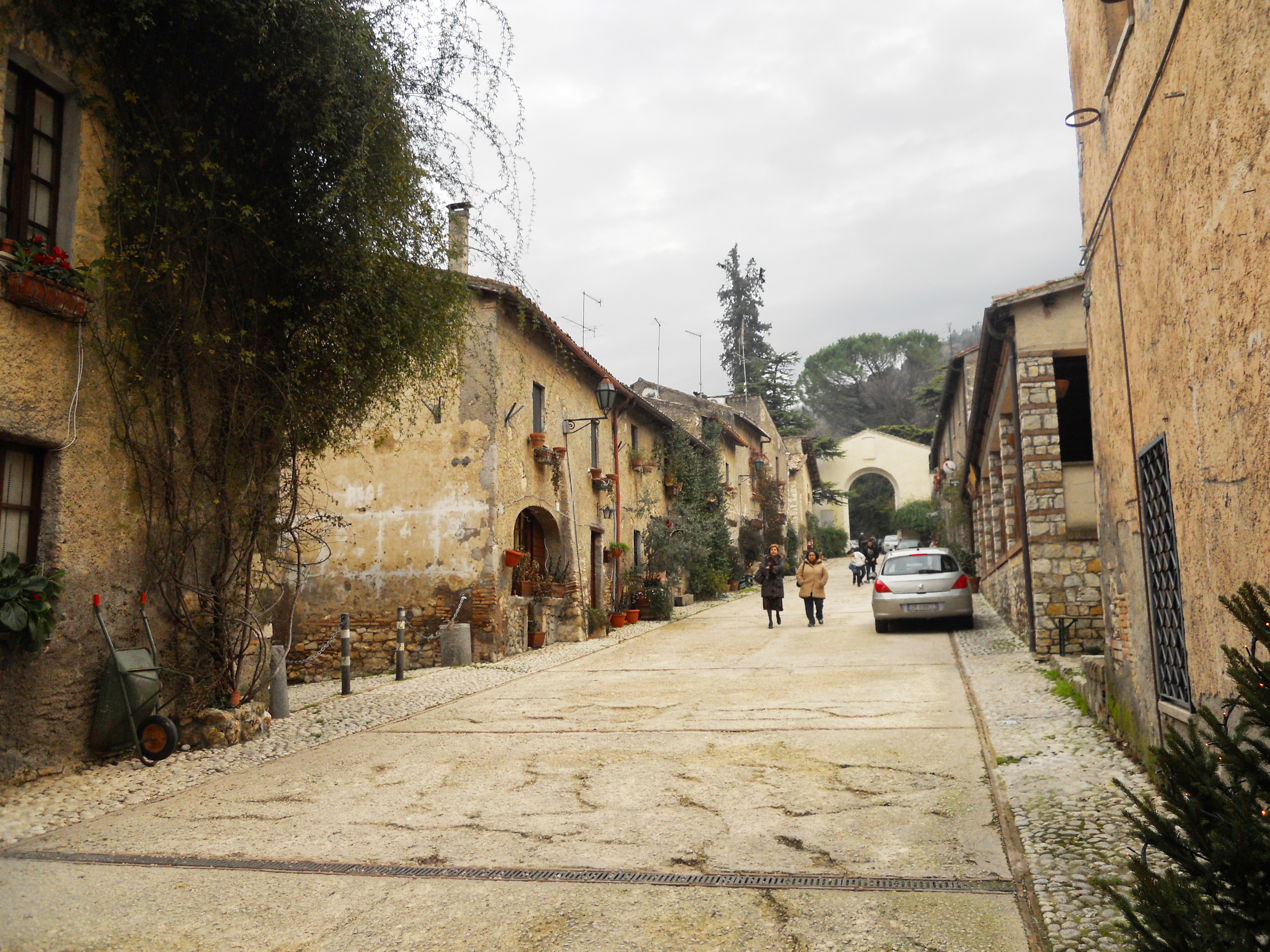
- The main street of the hamlet below the abbey

- Location of Farfa in Italy
- Coordinates: 42°13′16.66″N 12°43′7.27″E
- Country: Italy
- Region: Lazio
- Province: Rieti (RI)
- Comune: Fara in Sabina
- Elevation: 138 m (453 ft)

Population (2011)
  - Total: 42
- Time zone: UTC+1 (CET)
  - Summer (DST): UTC+2 (CEST)
- Postal code: 02032
- Dialing code: (+39) 0765

Farfa Abbey (Italian: Abbazia di Farfa) is a territorial abbey in northern Lazio, central Italy. In the Middle Ages, it was one of the richest and most famous abbeys in Italy. It belongs to the Benedictine Order and is located about 60 km (37 mi) from Rome, in the comune (municipality) of Fara Sabina, of which it is also a frazione (hamlet).

In 2016 it was added to the "tentative" list to be a UNESCO World Heritage Site, as part of a group of eight Italian medieval Benedictine monasteries, representing "The cultural landscape of the Benedictine settlements in medieval Italy".

== History ==
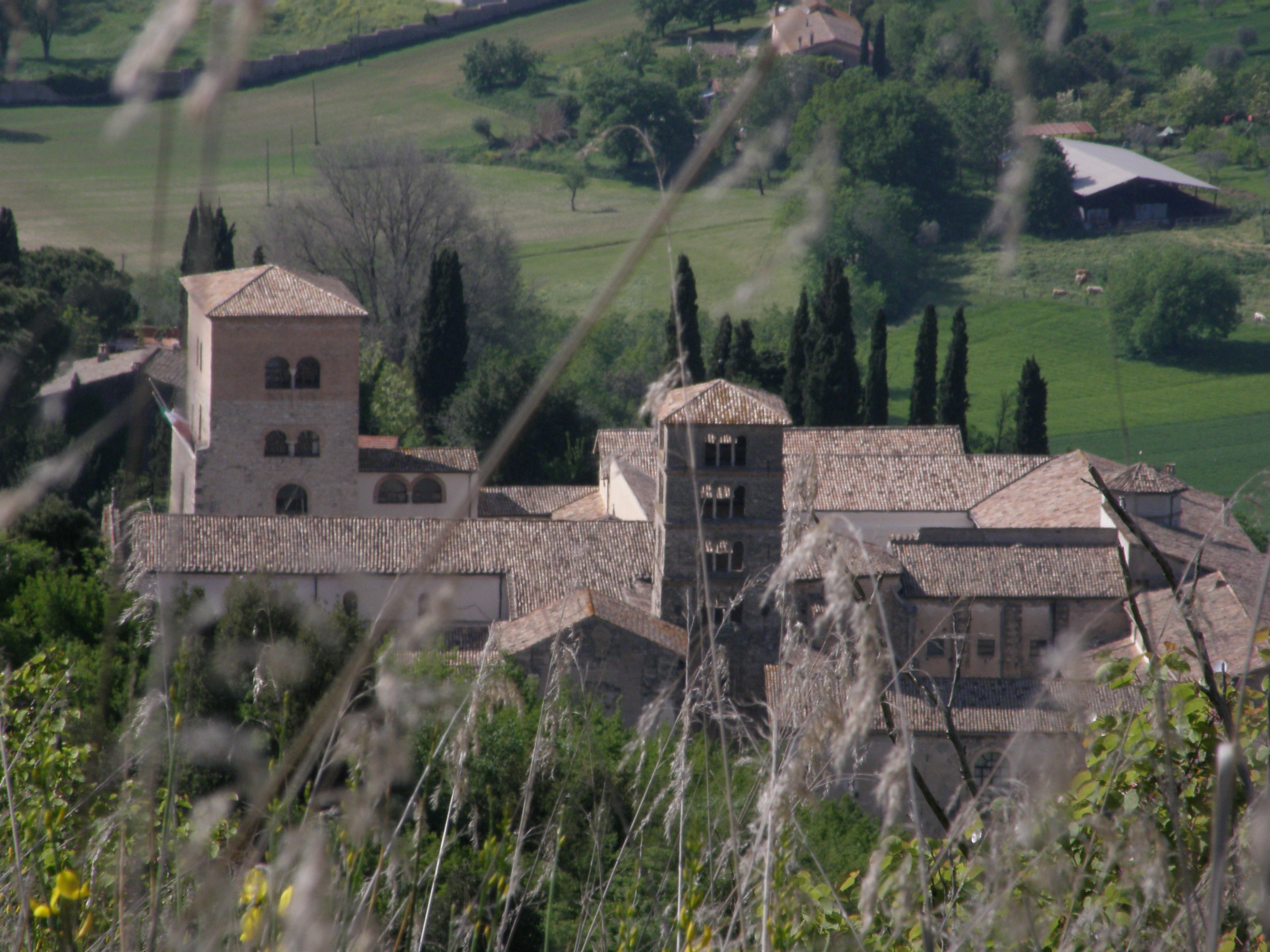
View of the abbey from Monte Acuziano

A legend in the 12th-century Chronicon Farfense (Chronicle of Farfa) dates the founding of a monastery at Farfa to the time of the Emperors Julian, or Gratian, and attributes the founding to Laurence the Illuminator, a Syrian who had come to Rome with his sister, Susannah, together with other monks, and had been made Bishop of Spoleto. According to the tradition, after being named bishop, he became enamoured of the monastic life, and chose a forested hill near the Farfa stream, a tributary of the Tiber, to build a church and a monastery. Archaeological discoveries in 1888 find strong evidence that the first monastic establishment was built on the ruins of a pagan temple. This first monastery was devastated by the Vandals in the fifth century. Only a handful of sixth-century finds document the early presence of the monastic community.

In the seventh century, a wave of Irish monasticism spread over Italy. The foundation the Abbey of Saint Columbanus in Bobbio and of Farfa by monks from Gaul, about 681, heralded a revival of the great Benedictine tradition in Italy. The Constructio Monasterii Farfensis, which dates probably from 857, relates at length the story of its principal founder Thomas of Maurienne; he had made a pilgrimage to Jerusalem and spent three years there. While in prayer before the Holy Sepulchre, the Virgin Mary in a vision warned him to return to Italy, and restore Farfa; and the Duke of Spoleto. Faroald II, who had also had a vision, was commanded to aid in this work. At a very early date traces of this legend appear in connexion with the foundation by three nobles from Benevento of the monastery of St Vincent on the Volturno, over which Farfa claimed jurisdiction. Thomas died in 720; and for more than a century Frankish abbots ruled at Farfa.

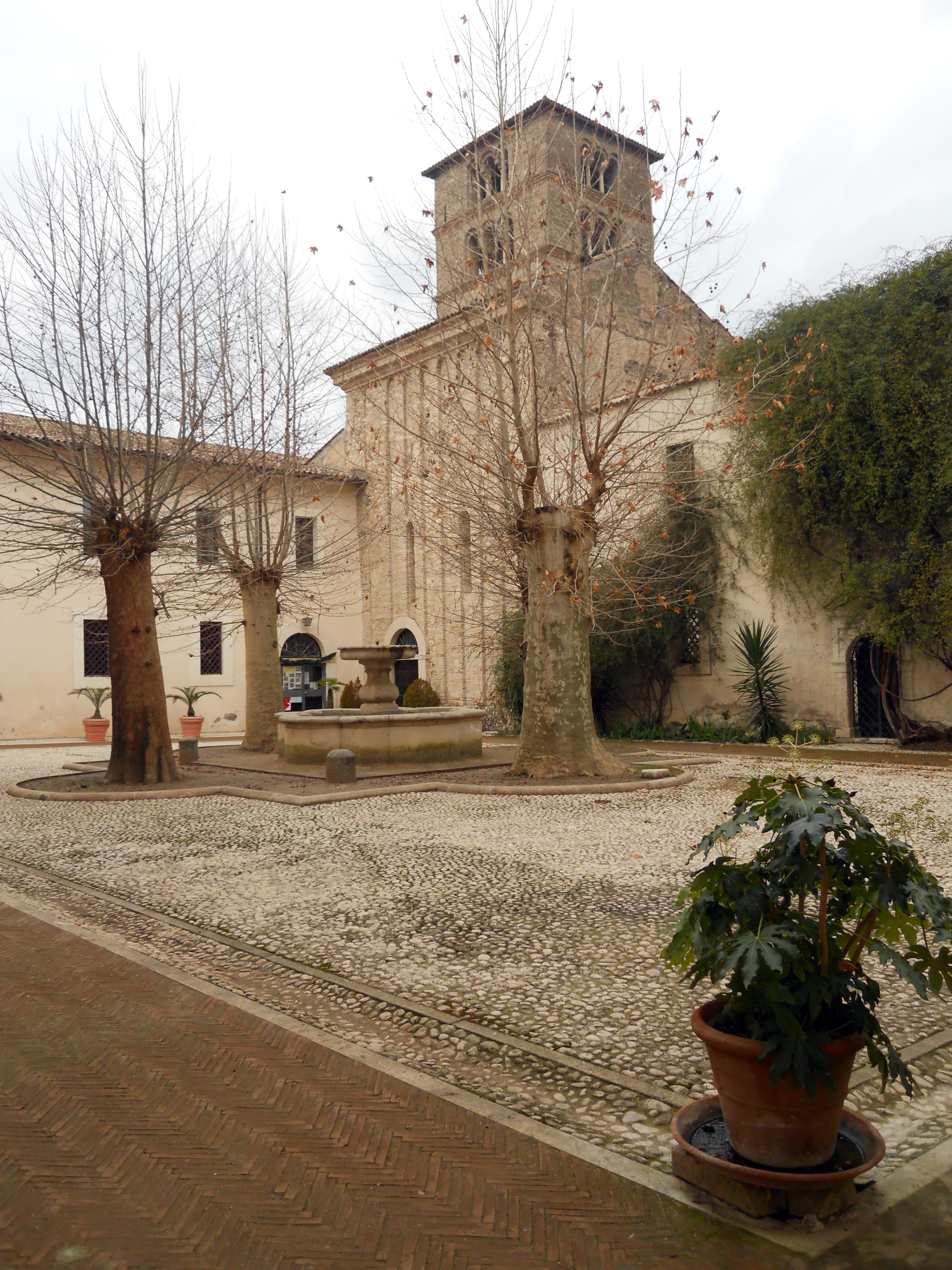
The abbey's court

The Lombard chiefs, and later the Carolingians, succeeded in withdrawing Farfa from obedience to the Bishops of Rieti, and in securing many immunities and privileges for the monastery. According to the Chronicon Farfense, with the exception of the Abbey of Nonatola, Farfa was at this period the most important monastery in Italy both from the point of view of worldly riches and ecclesiastical dignity. In 898, the abbey was sacked by Saracens who then burned it.

Between 930 and 936, Farfa was rebuilt by Abbot Ratfredus, who was afterwards poisoned by two wicked monks, Campo and Hildebrand, who divided the wealth of the abbey between them, and ruled over it until Alberic II of Spoleto, Prince of the Romans, called in Odo of Cluny to reform Farfa and other monasteries in the Duchy of Rome. Campo was exiled, and a holy monk with the Merovingian name of Dagibert took his place. At the end of five years, he also died by poison—and the moral condition of Farfa was once more deplorable. The monks robbed the altars of their ornaments, and led lives of unbridled vice.

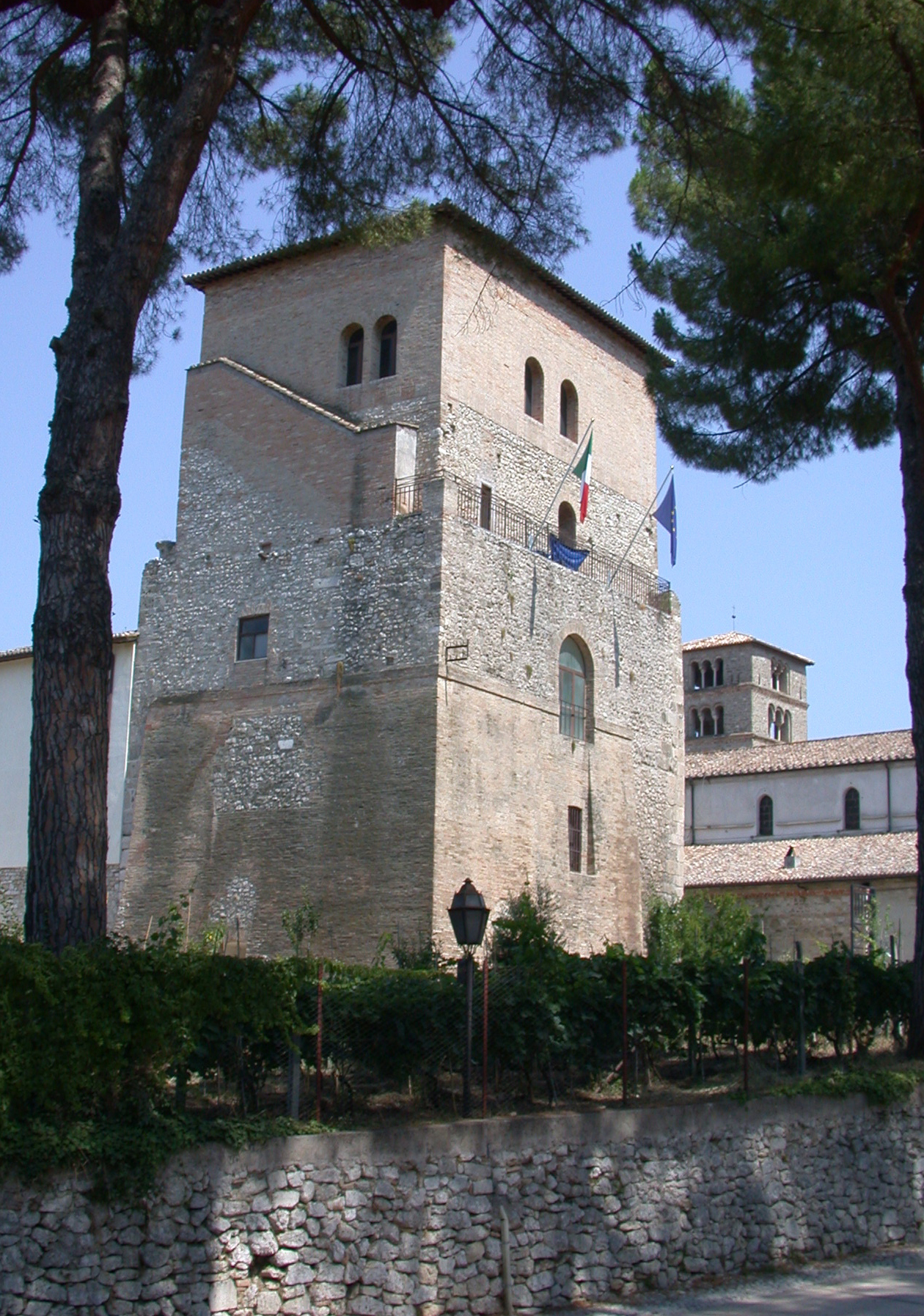
Abbey's tower

Owing to the protection of the Emperor Otto I, the abbot John III, who had been consecrated circa 967 by the pope, succeeded in re-establishing a semblance of order. But the great reformer of Farfa was Hugues (998–1010). His nomination as abbot was not secured without simony—but the success of his government palliates the vice of his election. At this instance, abbots Odilo of Cluny and William of Dijon, visited Farfa, and re-established there the love of piety and of study.

The Consuetudines Farfenses drawn up about 1010 under the supervision of Guido, successor to Hugues of Farfa, bear witness to the care with which Hugues organized the monastic life at Farfa. Under the title Destructio Monasterii, Hugues himself wrote a history of the sad period previous to his rule; and again under the title Diminutio Monasterii, and Querimonium, he related the temporal difficulties that encompassed Farfa owing to the ambition of petty Roman lords. These works are very important for the historian of the period.

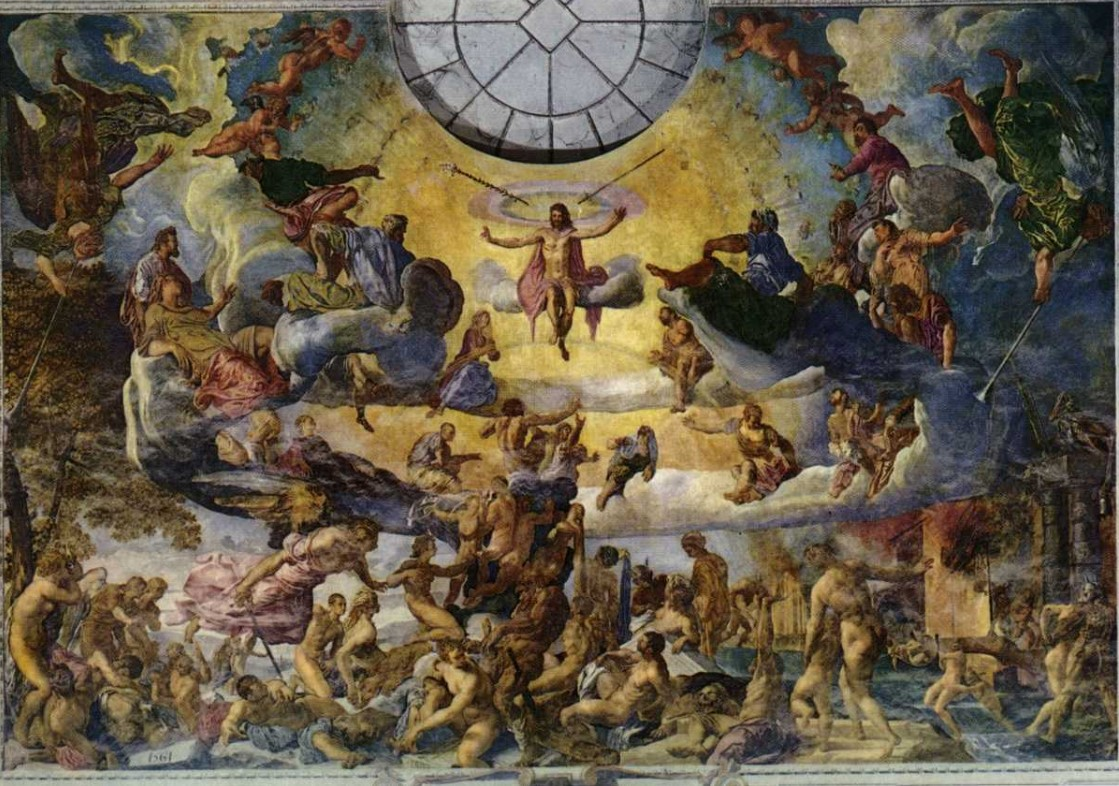
The Last Judgement by Hendrick van den Broeck

One of Hugue's successors, Berard I, abbot from 1049 to 1089, made the abbey a great seat of intellectual activity. The monk Gregory of Catino (born 1060) arranged the archives. To substantiate Farfa's claims and the rights of its monks, he edited the Regesto di Farfa, or Liber Gemniagraphus sive Cleronomialis ecclesiæ Farfensis composed of 1324 documents, all very important for the history of Italian society in the 11th century.

In 1103, Gregory wrote the Largitorium, or Liber Notarius sive emphiteuticus, a lengthy list of all the concessions, or grants, made by the monastery to its tenants. Having collected all this detailed information, he set to work on a history of the monastery, the Chronicon Farfense; and when he was 70 years old, in order to facilitate reference to his earlier works, he compiled a sort of index which he styled "Liber Floriger Chartarum cenobii Farfensis". Gregory was a man of real learning, remarkable in that, as early as the eleventh century, he wrote history with accuracy of view-point, and a great wealth of information.

The monks of Farfa owned 683 churches or convents; two towns, Centumcellæ (Civitavecchia) and Alatri; 132 castles; 16 strongholds; 7 seaports; 8 salt mines; 14 villages; 82 mills; 315 hamlets. All this wealth was a hindrance to the religious life once more. Between 1119 and 1125, Farfa was troubled by the rivalries between Abbot Guido, and the monk Berard who aimed at being abbot. During the Investiture conflict, Farfa was, more or less, on the side of the Ghibellines. The monks issued an Orthodoxa defensio imperialis in support of the Ghibelline party. The collection of canonical texts contained in the Regesto seems to omit purposely any mention of the canonical texts of the reforming popes of the 11th century. But when, in 1262, the victory of the popes over the last of the Hohenstaufen put an end to the Germanic rule in Italy, Farfa sought the protection of Urban IV. At the end of the 14th century the Abbey of Farfa became a cardinalatial in commendam, and since 1842 the Cardinal Bishop of Sabina, a suburbicarian bishop, bears also the title of Abbot of Farfa.

The Orsini family stayed to the early 16th century, consecrating the cathedral in 1494. They were succeeded by the Della Rovere, but the Orsini came back and stayed until 1542. Later the monastery was taken over by the Farnese family. Ranuccio Farnese (cardinal) was its abbot commendatory when in 1561 he commissioned the Flemish painter Hendrick van den Broeck to create a large painting of the Last Judgement for the Abbey. Under the management of Ranuccio's brother Cardinal Alessandro Farnese, the monastery joined the Cassinese Congregation (1567). During the next two centuries in spite of some restorations and new constructions Farfa lost all importance. The monastery was suppressed in 1798 followed another in 1861 by the new Kingdom of Italy.

Part of the possessions were sold to private citizens. Felice Giacomo Vitale was the previous owner who sold Farfa Abbey to Count Volpi (Vitale was a notable lawyer in Rome Turn of the 20th century. He was the same owner of villino Vitale in Via dei Gracchi, Rome). The heirs of the last owner, Count Volpi, donated part of the monastery owned by them and some land around it to the monks. In 1920, a group of monks sent by Alfredo Ildefonso Schuster, then Abbot of the Abbey of St. Paul Outside the Walls in Rome (attached to the Basilica of Saint Paul Outside the Walls), gave new life to Farfa Abbey in establishing a monastic community, Farfa was declared a national monument but only much later were steps taken to reconstruct and repair the buildings.

== Cathedral ==
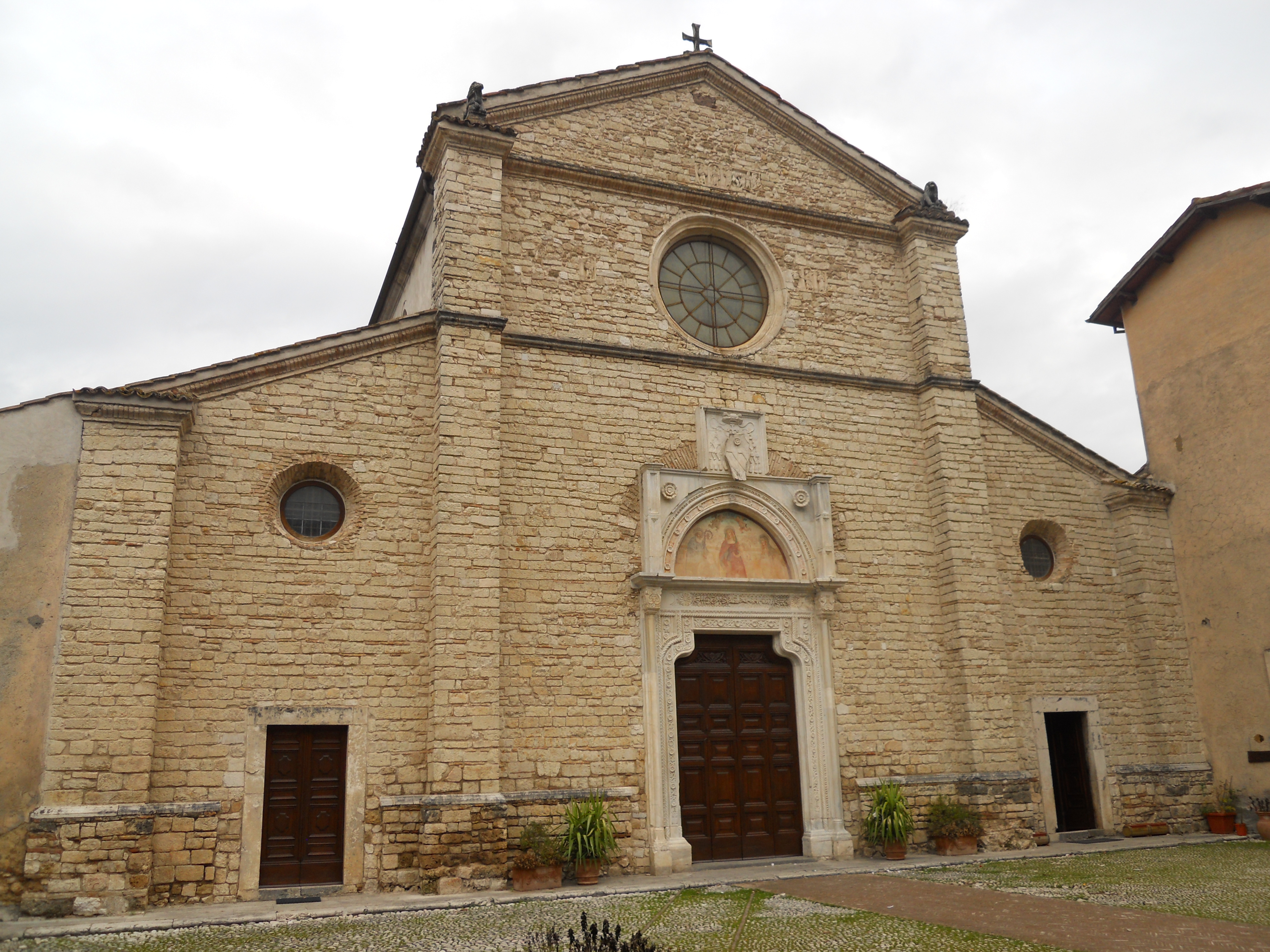
The church's façade

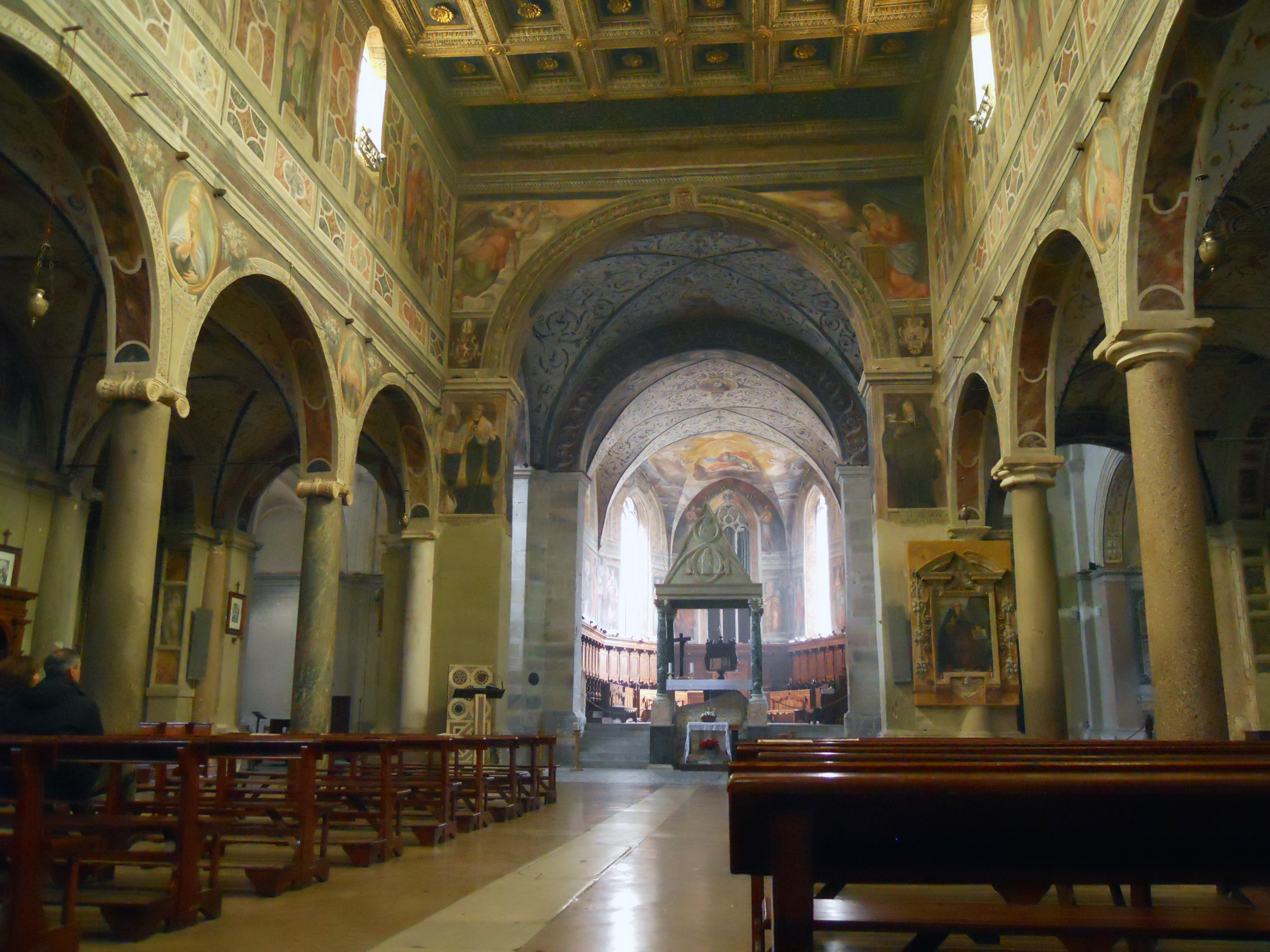
The church's interior

The cathedral has a huge Romanesque gate, with magnificent floral friezes. The interior has three naves, and the middle one is surmounted with a lunette representing the Virgin and the Child. The Renaissance hall has several chapels: the most venerated image of Farfa is housed in the Crucifix Chapel. The interior wall of the façade has a large canvas depicting the Last Judgment (1571) by the Flemish painter Hendrick van den Broeck.

Ruins of the ancient 9th century church are included in the church and the monastery. In 1961, in the apse, a precious Roman sarcophagus from the 1st or 2nd century AD was discovered. The large cloister is from the 16th century. The bell tower belongs to the original Carolingian buildings. Inside, at the lower end, Abbot Sichard had an oratory built.

== List of abbots ==
1. Thomas of Maurienne (680/700 – c. 720)
2. Aunepert (720–24)
3. Lucerius (724–40)
4. Fulcoald (740–59)
5. Wandelbert (c. 759–61)
6. Alan (–769)
7. Guicpert (769–70)
8. Probatus (770–81)
9. Ragambald (781–86)
10. Altpert (786–90)
11. Mauroald (790–802)
12. Benedict (802–15)
13. Ingoald (815–30)
14. Sichard (c. 830–42)
15. Hilderic (844–57)
16. Perto (857–72)
17. John I (872–81)
18. Anselm (881–83)
19. Teuto (883 – c. 888)
20. Nordepert (c. 888)
21. Spento (c. 888)
22. Vitalis (c. 889)
23. Peter (c. 890 – c. 919)
24. Rimo (c. 920–930)
25. Ratfredus (930–36)
26. Hildebrand (936–43/7)
27. Campo (936–943/7)
28. Dagobert (943/7–952)
29. John III (967–)
30. Hugh (998–1039)
31. Berard I (–1089)
32. Berard II (–1099)
33. Oddo (1099)

Abbots commendatory:

- Francesco Tomacelli (1400–1406)
- Francesco Viterbese (1406–1414)
- Giordano Orsini (1420–1437)
- Giovanni Orsini (1437–1476)
- Latino Orsini (1476)
- Cosimo Orsini (1476–1481)
- Battista Orsini (1482–1504)
- Galeotto Franciotto della Rovere (1505–1513)
- Giovanni Giordano Orsini (1513–1517)
- Napoleone Orsini (1517–1530)
- Francesco Orsini (1530–1546)
- Ranuccio Farnese (cardinal) (1546–1564)
- Alessandro Farnese (cardinal) (1564–1573)

(interregnum)

- Alessandro Peretti di Montalto (1591–1623)
- Francesco Orsini (1623–1627)
- Francesco Barberini (1627–1666)
- Carlo Barberini (1666–?)

== The village ==
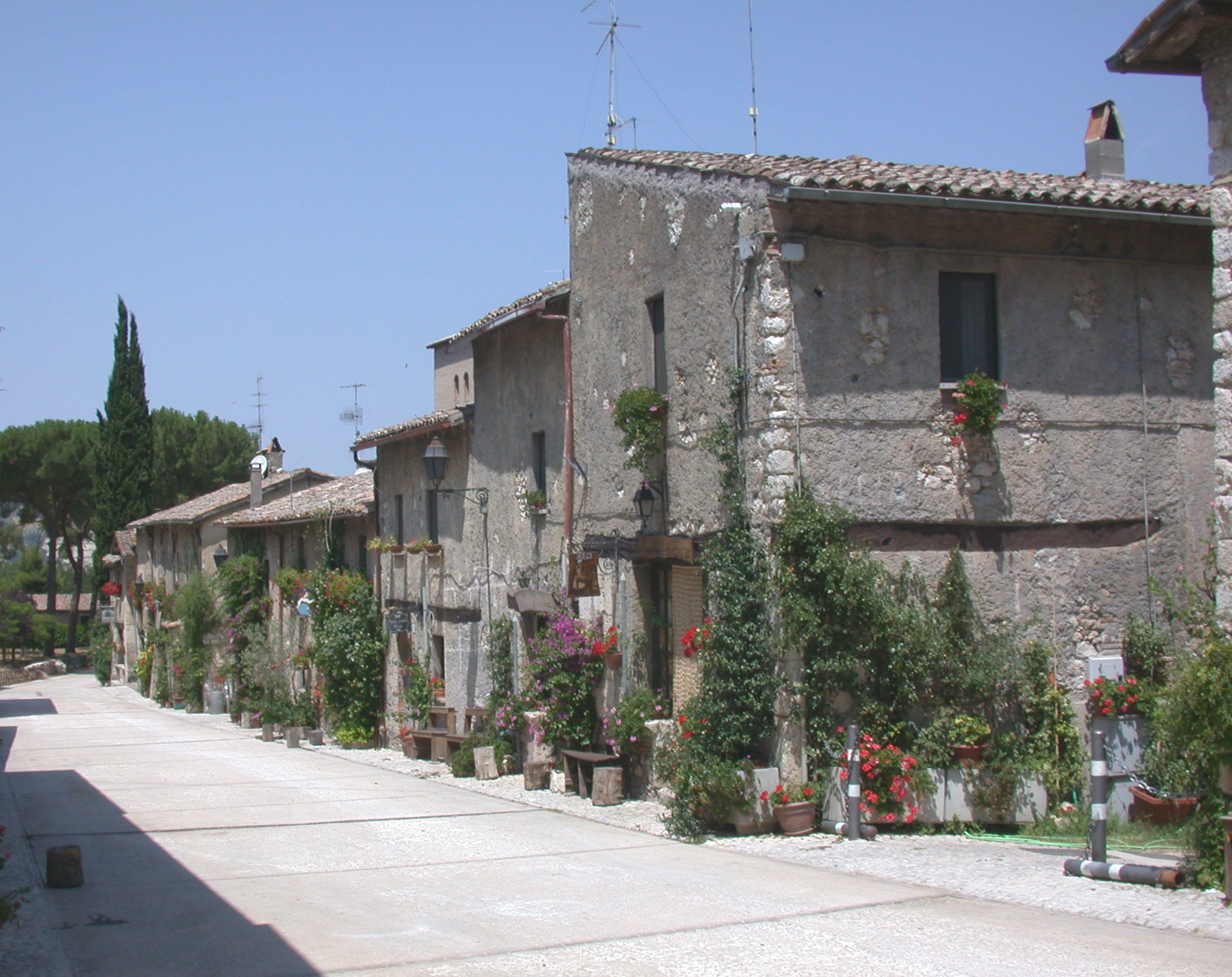
Some houses of the village

The little medieval village of Farfa lies around the abbey and has a population of 42.

== Transport ==
Nearest railway station, Fara Sabina-Montelibretti, is located at Passo Corese and is 10 km (6.2 mi) from the abbey. The station is part of the Roman suburban railway line FL1 Orte–Fiumicino.

== See also ==
- Modern Automata Museum
- Abbey of San Pastore

== Sources ==
- Howe, John (1997). Church Reform and Social Change in Eleventh-Century Italy: Dominic of Sora. University of Pennsylvania Press. ISBN 9780812234121.13
- Partner, Peter (2023). The Lands of St Peter: The Papal State in the Middle Ages and the Early Renaissance. University of California Press. ISBN 9780520322585.
- Stroll, Mary (1997). The Medieval Abbey of Farfa: Target of Papal and Imperial Ambitions. Brill. ISBN 9789004247284.
