= Sichard of Farfa =

Ninth century Italian monk

Sichard in a medieval document

Sichard (Latin: Sichardus; Italian: Sicardo) was a 9th century Italian monk. He was the Abbot of Farfa from c. 830 to 842. During his tenure, there was a drop in the number of property transactions involving Farfa, perhaps because "[its] wealth was by that time sufficient to cover major building at the abbey itself". Sichard did acquire the church of San Martino al Cimino through a donation.He also added an oratory to the existing abbey.

On Sichard's death in 842, Emperor Lothair I intervened to appoint Bishop Peter of Spoleto in charge of the abbey until an abbot, Hilderic, could be elected (in 844). Sichard's epitaph was copied into the Libellus constructionis Farfensis, the earliest history of Farfa, of which only a fragment survives in an eleventh-century lectionary. The rediscovery, in 1959, of most of the epitaph demonstrates that the author of the Libellus was an accurate copyist.
