= John I of Farfa =

Italian abbot

John I (died c. 881) was the Abbot of Farfa from 871/2. He made a few property acquisitions, but his abbacy comes at the start of an obscure period in Farfa's history. He received a confirmation from the Emperor Louis II of all of Farfa's lands on 27 May 872 and another from Charles the Bald in 875. Charles confirmed the abbey's freedom from taxation and secular jurisdiction and gave its abbots jurisdiction in suits involving subjects of the monastery's lands.
