= Hilderic of Farfa =

Hilderic (died 857) was the fifteenth Abbot of Farfa from 844. In 842 Abbot Sichard died, and the Emperor Lothair I (840–55) intervened to appoint Bishop Peter II of Spoleto in control of the abbey in the interim. Peter organised an election, in which the monks chose Hilderic, and convinced Lothair to confirm him in the abbacy in 844. From his death in 857 the history of the abbey falls into relative obscurity until about 920. The anonymous Libellus constructionis Farfensis, which in its original form was composed in the late ninth century, relates the history of Farfa from its foundation by Thomas of Maurienne down to the death of Hilderic.
