= Gregory of Catino =

Italian monk and historian

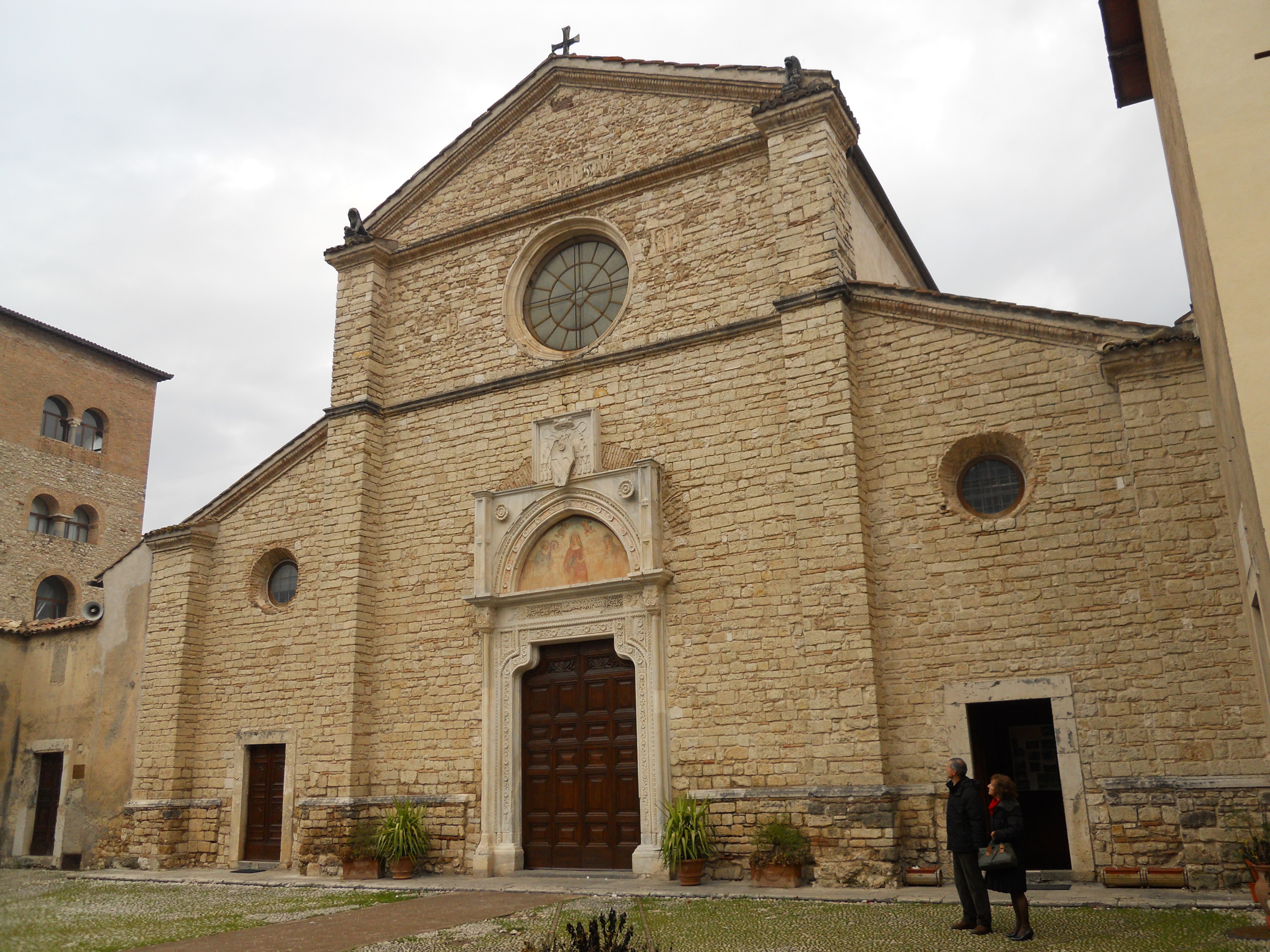
The abbey of Farfa today.

Gregory of Catino (1060 – aft. 1130) was a monk of the Abbey of Farfa and "one of the most accomplished monastic historians of his age." Gregory died shortly after 1130, possibly in 1133.

Gregory was born into the family of the counts of Catino, a town near Farfa. His father, Dono, entered him and his elder brother into Farfa as child oblates. Gregory was educated in the abbatial school founded by Abbot Hugh, and he remained resident at the abbey for the rest of his life.

== Archival and documentary work ==
In 1092 Gregory proposed a major overhaul of Farfa's archives to Abbot Berard II, who promptly commissioned him to do it. He began on 19 April, copying every charter in the archives—save leases, which he was planning to do in a separate work. His work was interrupted by circumstances at the monastery, but by 1099 and Berard's death the work was substantially complete down to that year. It was a two-volume collection he titled Liber gemniagraphus sive cleronomialis ecclesiae pharphensis, usually known as the Regestum Farfense, now in the Biblioteca Apostolica Vaticana. He did the reader the favour of glossing his own neologisms: gemniagraphus meant memoria descriptionis terrarum (descriptive record of lands) and by cleronomialem he meant heredity, indicating that Farfa's lands remained with it as if hereditary.

Between 1099 and 1103 Gregory compiled a collection of excerpts of canon law for the introduction of the Regestum. This collection, known as the Collectio Farfensis or Collectio Canonum, primarily contains excerpts about property rights. There is disagreement among scholars today whether Gregory had a specific political purpose in mind in his selection, or was simply affirming the property rights of the abbey to its own monks. There are also three charters copied in Gregory's hand and bound into a volume with one of his later historical works. These seem to represent an earlier attempt to preserve Farfa's archives that was abandoned in favour of a comprehensive treatment, the Regestum. This edition of three charters is sometimes therefore known as the "Prae-Regestum". In 1125 Gregory's nephew Todinus returned to his uncle's work and added seventy folios of new charters (post-1099) and a few older ones that Gregory had overlooked.

Between 1103 and 1107 Gregory was working on his Liber largitorius vel notarius monasterii pharphensis, which he titled his Liber notarius sive emphyteuticus. It is a register of all the long-term leases the abbey issued, intended to complement the Regestum's catalogue of fixed ("hereditary") possessions. These massive volumes were not easy to use for the monastery's agents in property disputes, and so, when already in his seventies (in the early 1130s), Gregory composed the Liber floriger chartarum coenobii pharphensis, an index of all the abbey's properties organised topographically by churches and estates. Gregory's Liber floriger has been superseded by the indices of the modern editors of Farfa's charters.

== Historical work ==
Around 1107, perceiving the need for a narrative history of Farfa to complement the documentary version he had already compiled, Gregory began an untitled work that has become known as the Chronicon Farfense. Finished in 1119, it is the primary source for the early history of the abbey. It is kept in the Biblioteca Nazionale of Italy in Rome. The Chronicon was immensely influential in "setting the tone for the writing of monastic history in Italy in the twelfth century." Among the works it influenced are the Chronicon Vulturnense, the Chronicon Novaliciense, and the Chronica monasterii Casinensis. It was itself dependent on two earlier chronicles of Farfa: the Libellus constructionis Farfensis, which covers the period from c. 700 down to the death of Abbot Hilderic, and the Destructio monasterii Farfensis, the historical work of Abbot Hugh, which continues from Hilderic's death in 857 down to Hugh's abbacy (998–1039). Besides a chronicle of Farfa's history from its foundation by Lawrence of Syria down to Gregory's day, the Chronicon also contains copies of its most important documents. In this it illustrates the purpose of all Gregory's historical works: "to defend the abbey's properties by shaping its archival and historical memory".

== Modern scholarly analysis ==
In 1973 a dispute arose concerning the accuracy of Gregory's copying and his motives at the Deutsches Historisches Instut (German Historical Institute) in Rome. In 1972 Herbert Zielinski had argued that Gregory did little more than he admitted to doing in his preface to the Regestum and what he was apparently commissioned to do: correct grammatical errors. Kurze responded the next year, arguing that the "Prae-Regestum" represents the remains of a larger work which was scrapped in favour of the current Regestum, which was heavily altered by Gregory, so much so that, Kurze claimed, no edition of the charters of the eighth century was even possible. In 1982 Carlrichard Brühl, at the annual conference of the Centro italiano di studi sull'alto medioevo (Italian centre for the study of the early Middle Ages), gave an "intemperate" response to Kurze's thesis, but one which has been generally accepted. The Regestum, while not perfect, is highly accurate and certainly useful for a study of early medieval Italy.

== His works in modern editions ==
- Balzani, Ugo, ed. Il Chronicon Farfense di Gregorio di Catino, 2 vols., Fonti per la storia d'Italia, 33. Rome: 1903.
- Balzani, Ugo, and Ignazio Giorgi, edd. Il Regesto di Farfa, 5 vols. Rome: 1879–1914.
- Kölzer, Theo, ed. Collectio Canonum Regesto Farfensi Inserta, Monumenta iuris canonici, series B, Corpus Collectionum, vol. V (Vatican City: 1982).
- Maggi Bei, M. T., ed. Il ‘Liber Floriger’ di Gregorio di Catino, Miscellanea della Società romana di storico patria, 26. Rome: 1984.
- Zuccheti, G., ed. Liber Largitorius vel Notarii Monasterii Pharphensis, 2 vols., Regesta Chartarum Italiae, 11, 17. Rome: 1913, 1932.
