= Csaba (chieftain) =

10th-century Magyar chieftain and military leader

Csaba (Latin: Schaba) was a Hungarian chieftain and military leader in the 10th century, who took part in the Hungarian invasions of Europe. He is one of the sources of the legendary figure of Prince Csaba.

== Sources ==
The 16th-century Humanist historian Johannes Aventinus, who utilized 10–11th century annals which had lost since then, writes that the Hungarian invading army was led by Bulcsú and his four sub-generals, Csaba (Schaba), Lehel, Súr and Taksony in the disastrous Battle of Lechfeld in August 955.

The unidentified author of the early 13th-century Gesta Hungarorum writes that two chieftains, Szovárd and Kadocsa, who took part in the Hungarian conquest of the Carpathian Basin (late 9th century), settled down in the Balkans, then a province of the Byzantine Empire, together with their people who "are now called »Sobamogera«". Anonymus adds that they remained "in Greece and they were thus called soba by the Greeks, that is stupid people, because with their lord dead they did not take the way home".

Simon of Kéza, who compiled his Gesta Hunnorum et Hungarorum in the early 1280s, writes that Csaba (Chaba) was the son of Attila, king of the Huns and a daughter of Honorius. After Attila's death, he was involved in a struggle for the throne against his half-brother Aladar. Csaba's army was heavily defeated in the "battle of Krimhild", where several of his people were killed. "Csaba, however, escaped, and with 15,000 Huns fled to Honorius in Greece. The emperor was willing to keep him on and to let him reside in Greece, but Csaba declined to stay and returned to his father's people and his relations in Scythia. When he arrived in Scythia, he immediately set about urging the whole people to return all the way to Pannonia in order to wreak vengeance on the Germans". Simon adds that "Székely believed that Csaba perished in Greece; the common people have preserved a saying among themselves which they address to a person departing: »May you return when Csaba returns from Greece!«" Simon provides a detail of Csaba's family. Accordingly, he had two sons – Ed and Edemen – and he was ancestor of the powerful Aba clan.

== Etymology ==
According to linguist Dezső Pais, Csaba's name derives from Turkic noun çoban ("shepherd") or Chagatai noun čaba ("gift"). Árpád Berta argued that many Turkic root words could be considered as the origin of the name, for instance, Turkish çaba ("endeavor"), Kyrgyz čaba ("against something"), Turkish çapa or Azerbaijani čapa (both "anchor" or "hoe") etc. All of them derive from Old Turkic verb čap- ("run", "rush", "hit", "cut").

== Interpretations ==
Based on the aforementioned narrative sources, it is possible that Csaba led one of the Székely tribes which settled down in the gyepű along the western border during the Hungarian conquest, as historian Bálint Hóman considered. In this context, Csaba affiliated with the Transdanubian tribal confederation led by harka Bulcsú, who perhaps was the superior of the subjugated people belonging to the Magyar tribes. Historian György Györffy considered that Békéscsaba, possibly a residence of the Székelys of Bihar, preserved the name of the 10th-century chieftain. Ferenc Makk rejected this, arguing that the first mention of the settlement occurred only in 1332.

It is considered that Csaba survived the Battle of Lechfeld and, together with his people, left Hungary and settled down in the Balkans around the valley of the river Vardar. There are assumptions that his people or tribe (Sobamogera, lit. "Csaba's Magyars") is related to the Vardariotai, who appear in Byzantine sources from the same period. Györffy argued the memory of Csaba's relocation became a basis of the 5th-century legendary figure of Prince Csaba, Attila's son and ancestor of the Székelys, in the later Hungarian chronicles, which also connected with his person with the powerful Aba clan since its progenitor was also called as Csaba (Chaba; possibly the father of Samuel Aba) in the early 11th century, merging both persons into the figure of legendary Csaba, king of Huns. Regarding the Prince Csaba legend, the chronicles merged memory of two events: firstly, before the Hungarian conquest, there was a group of "Savard Hungarians" that broke off and moved across the Caucasus into Persian territory in the 8th century, secondly, chieftain Csaba and his tribe moved to the Balkans in the 10th century. Simon of Kéza was the first known chronicler who suggested a relationship between Csaba and the Székelys. According to Györffy, Simon modified his original source Jordanes' Getica, inserting Csaba's story into the Hunnic history centuries earlier, in place of Ernak, Attila's son.

Linguist Károly Czeglédy attempted to identify the seven leaders during the Hungarian raid in Spain in 942, a list provided by Ibn Ḥayyān. He solved the first name, the greatest in dignity, as "Šānā", in his study in 1979. A year later, Györffy claimed that it was a typo of the original text and fixed the name as "Šābā", identifying him with the 10th-century chieftain Csaba. Based on this, Györffy suggested that Csaba served as Grand Prince of the Hungarians in 942, despite he was not a member of the ruling Árpád dynasty. The historian claimed that Csaba was ousted by Bulcsú and Fajsz sometime between 942 and 948, and his reign was deliberately silenced before Emperor Constantine VII, who thus does not mention it in his work De Administrando Imperio. After his fall, Csaba fled to the Balkans together with his supporters. Other historians did not accept Györffy's theory, which based on Czeglédy's assumption, who examined the Arabic text only via poor quality photocopy. Pedro Chalmeta Gendrón published the critical edition of Ibn Ḥayyān's al-Muqtabis in 1979. Analyzing its text, István Elter provided different reading of the Arabic names of Hungarian leaders in 942, and the first name simply refers to the dignity gyula. Thereafter, Györffy partially abandoned his theory. In his 1984 monograph, he considered that Csaba served as leader of the Székely tribes at the time of the 942 campaign. He was defeated during an internal struggle prior to 948. Ferenc Makk emphasized that this claim contradicts with Csaba's involvement in the 955 campaign as reported by Aventinus.

After 1948, 1980 and 1984, György Györffy presented his fourth theory regarding chieftain Csaba in 1993. Accordingly, Csaba was perhaps a member of the Árpád dynasty as the son or grandson of Liüntika. In this reconstruction, his tribal territory covered the future Abaúj and Heves counties. Györffy also proposed that Csaba was perhaps the son of Fajsz, who is mentioned as grand prince by Constantine around 950. After the Battle of Lechfeld and the deposition of Fajsz, Csaba tried to seize power, with the support of the Székely people, but was defeated. Thereafter Csaba and some of the Székelys left for the Balkans, while other Székely groups were forced to settle to the gyepűs along the borders (Western Hungary and Transylvania). Ferenc Makk refused Györffy's theories arguing they are based purely on the etymology of the names of settlements, expanded with imagination and combination of sources to prove his preconception. Instead, Makk proposed that Csaba and his tribe were laid under the suzerainty of harka Bulcsú's tribal confederation and he took part in the Battle of Lechfeld in this capacity. After the defeat, Taksony, who became the new grand prince, decided to eliminate his internal rivals, i.e. the late Bulcsú's confederation, which then was led by Csaba, between 955 and 958. Makk claimed that Taksony attacked and seized Csaba's tribal territory in the Danube–Tisza Interfluve. After his fall, Csaba and a part of his people fled to the Byzantine Empire, while the remaining tribe were forced to settle in westernmost part of the Principality of Hungary.

Zoltán Kordé emphasized that the figure of the 10th-century military leader Csaba exclusively appears in Aventinus' Annales ducum Boiariae, where the chronicler also states that Csaba was among those Hungarian generals who were executed after the 955 battle. Kordé argued the person of Csaba was a mere intention made by the 16th-century Humanist scholar. Kordé claimed that Csaba, a member of the Aba clan, lived in the 11–12th centuries and settled with his people in the Balkans, under unclear circumstances.

== Sources ==
=== Primary sources ===
- Anonymus, Notary of King Béla: The Deeds of the Hungarians (Edited, Translated and Annotated by Martyn Rady and László Veszprémy) (2010). In: Rady, Martyn; Veszprémy, László; Bak, János M. (2010); Anonymus and Master Roger; CEU Press; ISBN 978-963-9776-95-1.
- Simon of Kéza: The Deeds of the Hungarians (Edited and translated by László Veszprémy and Frank Schaer with a study by Jenő Szűcs) (1999). CEU Press. ISBN 963-9116-31-9.

=== Secondary sources ===
- Györffy, György (1959). Tanulmányok a magyar állam eredetéről [Studies on the Origin of the Hungarian Statehood] (in Hungarian). A Magyar Néprajzi Társaság könyvtára 5, Akadémiai Kiadó.
- Györffy, György (1993). Krónikáink és a magyar őstörténet. Régi kérdések – új válaszok [Our Chronicles and the Hungarian Prehistory. Old Questions – New Answers] (in Hungarian). Balassi Kiadó. ISBN 963-7873-40-6.
- Herényi, István (1971). "Bulcsu nemzetségének nyári szállása az Árpádok korában [The Summer Residence of Bulcsú's Kindred during the Age of Árpáds]". Századok (in Hungarian). 105 (2). Magyar Történelmi Társulat: 355–386. ISSN 0039-8098.
- Kordé, Zoltán (1994). "Csaba". In Kristó, Gyula; Engel, Pál; Makk, Ferenc (eds.). Korai magyar történeti lexikon (9-14. század) [Encyclopedia of the Early Hungarian History (9th-14th centuries)] (in Hungarian). Akadémiai Kiadó. p. 143. ISBN 963-05-6722-9.
- Kordé, Zoltán (1996). "Néhány gondolat a Csaba-problémáról [Some Thoughts on the Csaba Problem]". Acta Universitatis Szegediensis. Acta Historica (in Hungarian). 103. MTA-SZTE-MOL Magyar Medievisztikai Kutatócsoport: 57–65. ISSN 0324-6965.
- Kristó, Gyula (1983). "A X. század közepi magyarság "nomadizmusának" kérdéséhez [On the Question of the "Nomadisation" of the Mid-10th-Century Hungarians]". Tanulmányok az Árpád-korról (in Hungarian). Magvető Könyvkiadó. pp. 51–76. ISBN 963-271-890-9.
- Makk, Ferenc (1995). "Csaba és Alpár [Csaba and Alpár]". In Koszta, László (ed.). Kelet és Nyugat között: Történeti tanulmányok Kristó Gyula tiszteletére (in Hungarian). University of Szeged. pp. 351–365. ISBN 963-482-083-2.
- Makk, Ferenc (2004). "A vezéri törzsek szálláshelyei a 10. században [The Quarters of the Ducal Tribes in the 10th century]". In Erdei, Gyöngyi; Nagy, Balázs (eds.). Változatok a történelemre, Tanulmányok Székely György tiszteletére (Monumenta Historica Budapestinensia 14. kötet) (in Hungarian). Budapesti Történeti Múzeum. pp. 119–127. ISBN 963-9340-41-3.
- Tóth, Sándor László (2015). A magyar törzsszövetség politikai életrajza [A Political Biography of the Hungarian Tribal Federation] (in Hungarian). Belvedere Meridionale. ISBN 978-615-5372-39-1.
