= Theoto (died 834) =

Theoto, also spelled Theodo, Theuto or Teuto (died June 834), was the archchancellor of the Carolingian Empire under Louis the Pious from 832 until his death and the abbot of two monasteries.

Theoto's origins are unknown. He has the same name as Theodo, the son of Duke Tassilo III of Bavaria, who like his father was forcibly monasticized in 788. They may be the same person. The future archchancellor is probably to be identified with the court chaplain of the same name who was choirmaster at the time of Harald Klak's baptism, as recorded in the poem of Ermold the Black. It is less likely that he is the same person as the vir spectabilis who was an imperial representative at the Council of Mantua in 827.

Theoto succeeded Fridugis as archchancellor sometime between 28 March and 13 July 832. On 19 November, he is recorded as the abbot of Marmoutier Abbey in Tours when the emperor, at the request of the Empress Judith, confirmed one of the abbey's possessions. He was also abbot of Saint-Martin at the time of his death, having succeeded Fridugis, who died on 10 August 833. The latest known document drawn up in his name is dated 15 May 834.

As abbot of Saint-Martin, Theoto owed military service. He was killed in Neustria during combat between the emperor's men and supporters of his rebellious son Lothar in June 834. His death is recorded in the Annals of Fulda, Annals of Saint-Bertin and Adrevald's Miracles of Saint Benedict. By 3 July, a new archchancellor had taken office.

== Sources ==
- Depreux, Philippe (1997). Prosopographie de l'entourage de Louis le Pieux (781–840) (PDF). Sigmaringen: Jan Thorbecke.
- Nelson, Janet L., ed. (1991). The Annals of St-Bertin. Manchester University Press.
