= Theodo =

Theodo, also spelled Theoto or Thioto, is a masculine given name of Germanic origin. It may refer to:

- Theodo of Bavaria, duke (r. c. 680 – c. 717), sometimes called Theodo I or Theodo II
- Theodo (son of Tassilo III), co-ruled Bavaria with his father (r. 782–787), sometimes called Theodo II
- Theoto (died 834), archchancellor under Louis the Pious
- Thioto (abbot of Fulda) (r. 856–869)
- Thioto (bishop of Würzburg) (r. 908–931)

== See also ==
- Teuto
