= Tassilo III of Bavaria =

Duke of Bavaria from 748 to 788

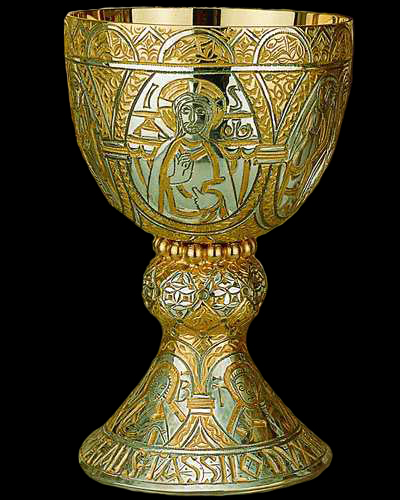
The Tassilo Chalice, c. 780 (reproduction)

Tassilo III (c. 741 – c. 796) was the duke of Bavaria from 748 to 788, the last of the house of the Agilolfings. He was the son of Duke Odilo of Bavaria and Hitrud, daughter of Charles Martel. Tassilo's reign ended when he was deposed by Charlemagne in 788.

== Reign ==
Tassilo, then still a child, began his rule as a Frankish ward under the tutelage of his uncle, the Carolingian Mayor of the Palace Pepin the Short (later king) after Tassilo's father, Duke Odilo of Bavaria, had died in 748 and Pepin's half-brother Grifo had tried to seize the duchy for himself. Pepin removed Grifo and installed the young Tassilo as duke, but under Frankish overlordship in 749.

In 757, according to the Royal Frankish Annals, Tassilo became Pepin's vassal and the lord for his lands at an assembly held at Compiegne. There, he is reported to have sworn numerous oaths to Pepin and, according to reports that may have been written much later, promised fealty to him and his sons, Charles and Carloman. However, the highly legalistic account is quite out of character for the period. K. L. Roper Pearson has suggested that it probably represents a reworking of the original document by the annalist to emphasise Charlemagne's overlordship over Tassilo during the period of hostilities between the two rulers.

Around 760, Tassilo married Liutperga, daughter of the Lombard king, Desiderius, continuing a tradition of Lombardo-Bavarian connections. He made several journeys to Italy to visit his father-in-law and to establish political relations with the pope. It is reported that Tassilo had gained such a reputation that he was regarded as a kingly ruler when his cousins Charles and Carloman assumed power in the Frankish realm in 768. That year, he founded Gars Abbey on the Inn River, in southern Bavaria. In the following year, 769, Tassilo issued in Bolzano the foundation charter of the Innichen Abbey. He was, however, not able to protect the pope against Lombard expansions, which has been seen as a reason for Rome's lack of support for him during his later conflict with Charlemagne. Still, there is a consensus among historians that Tassilo, despite acting as a kingly sovereign, did not intend to become king himself.

Tassilo nevertheless undertook such kingly duties as founding Kremsmünster Abbey. In 772, Tassilo sent his son Theodo to Italy to visit the court of his grandfather, Desiderius, and to be baptised by Pope Adrian I in Rome on May 19. In 773, Tassilo sent an embassy to the pope, but it was blocked by Charles, who was suspicious of the duke's alliances with Saxons, Wends, and Avars.

== Deposition ==
In 788 Tassilo was accused by the Franks of defaulting on his military obligations to Pepin, leaving the Frankish campaign in Aquitaine on grounds of ill health way back in 763. Roper Pearson suggests that he left because he felt an obligation to the Aquitanians in light of an earlier alliance, made between Tassilo's father and the Aquitanian duke Hunoald I during his conflict with Pepin in 743. Whatever the motivations behind Tassilo's abandonment of the campaign, the Royal Frankish Annals for that year are particularly scathing of him, saying that he "brushed aside his oaths and all his promises and sneaked away on a wicked pretext". Working on the premise that the annals may have been revised to emphasise Tassilo as a vassal, Roper Pearson suggests that to be the beginning of a campaign to depict Tassilo as an oath-breaker and someone unprepared to carry out the main function of his office, to fight, which would make him unfit for rule. Stuart Airlie has argued that the reason why Charlemagne removed Tassilo from power was the greater power he had in the duchy of Bavaria and the greater independency he displayed, Airlie compares the duchy of Bavaria was similar to Aquitaine in the independent nature and threat to Carolingian rule.

The incident was the linchpin in Charlemagne and Pope Adrian's argument that Tassilo was not an independent prince but a rebellious vassal, deserving punishment. The punishment was carried out, after much political maneuvering, during a diet in the Imperial Palace Ingelheim in 788, when Tassilo was finally deposed and then entered a monastery. In 794, Tassilo was again compelled, at the Synod of Frankfurt, to renounce his and his family's claims to Bavaria. He formally handed over to the king all of the rights that he had held. Tassilo died reportedly on the 11th of December in 796 at Lorsch Abbey in which he had been banished to by Charlemagne.

A lost chronicle of Tassilo's reign was kept by his chancellor, Creontius. It was partially preserved in the 16th century, when Johannes Aventinus incorporated some of its material into his Bavarian history.

== Family ==
By his marriage to Liutperga, Tassilo had two sons and two daughters:

- Theodo (born between 767 and 771), co-ruler from 782
- Theodbert (born after 784)
- Cotani, forced to become a nun at Chelles Abbey in 788
- Rotrud, forced to become a nun at Notre-Dame de Soissons in 788

== Notes ==
Preceded by Odilo	Duke of Bavaria; 748–788	Succeeded by Charlemagne
