= Tassilo Chalice =

Anglo-Saxon chalice, c. 770

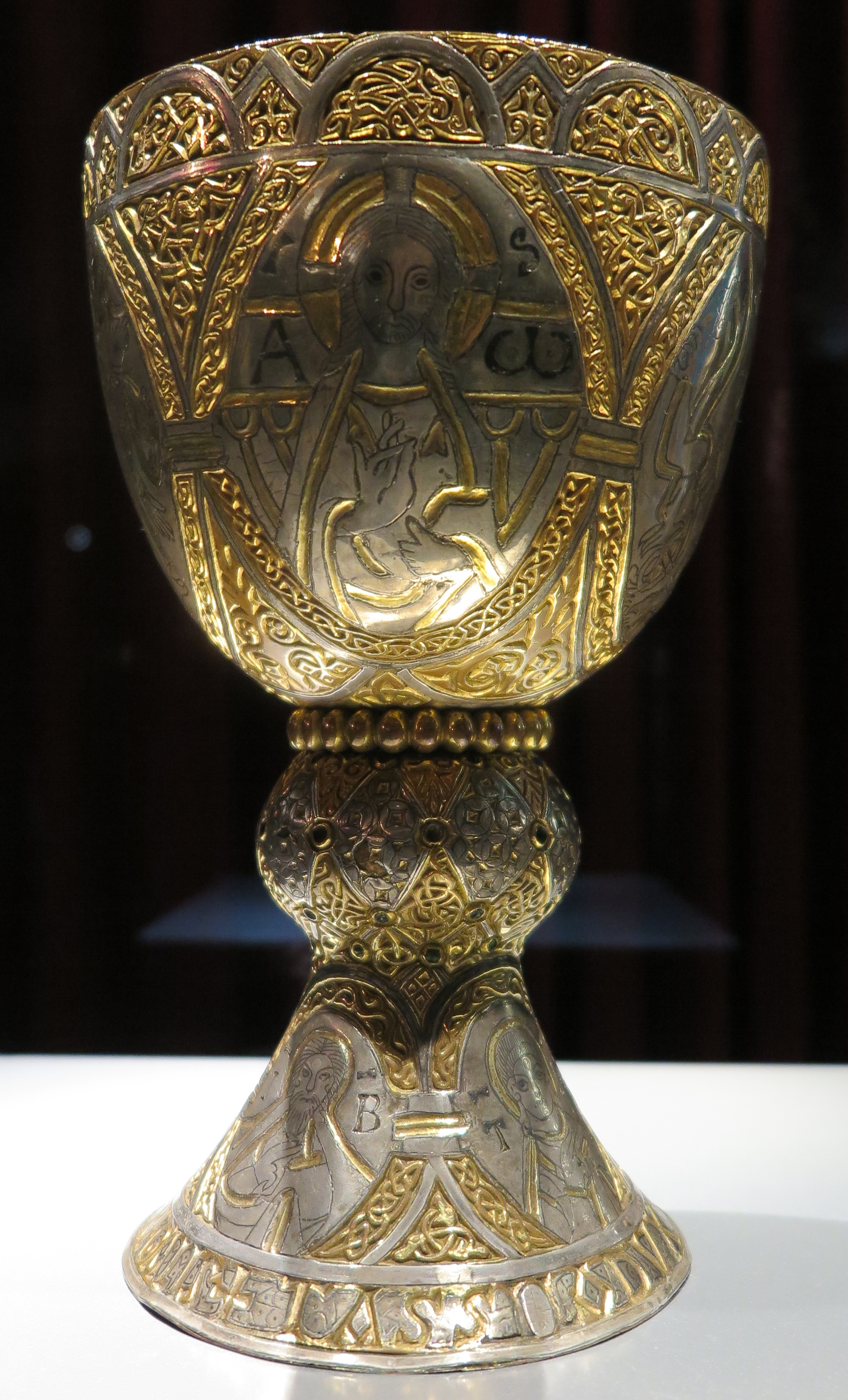
The Tassilo Chalice, c. 780

The Tassilo Chalice (German: Tassilokelch; Latin: Calix Tassilonis) is a bronze chalice, gilded with silver and gold, dating from the 8th century AD. The chalice is of Anglo-Saxon design. It is kept at Kremsmünster Abbey, Austria, where it has probably been since shortly after it was made.

== History ==
Dating from c. 770-790 AD, the chalice was donated by Liutperga, wife of the Bavarian Duke Tassilo III, possibly on the occasion of the establishment of the Benedictine Abbey at Kremsmünster in 777.

The chalice is composed of an egg-shaped cup, a large knop (ornamental knob), and a relatively narrow foot (base). The chalice is cast in bronze that has been gilded with gold and silver and decorated by various methods, including niello engraving and chip-carving. It stands 25.5 cm high, and weighs 3.05 kg; its cup holds approximately 1.75 litres.

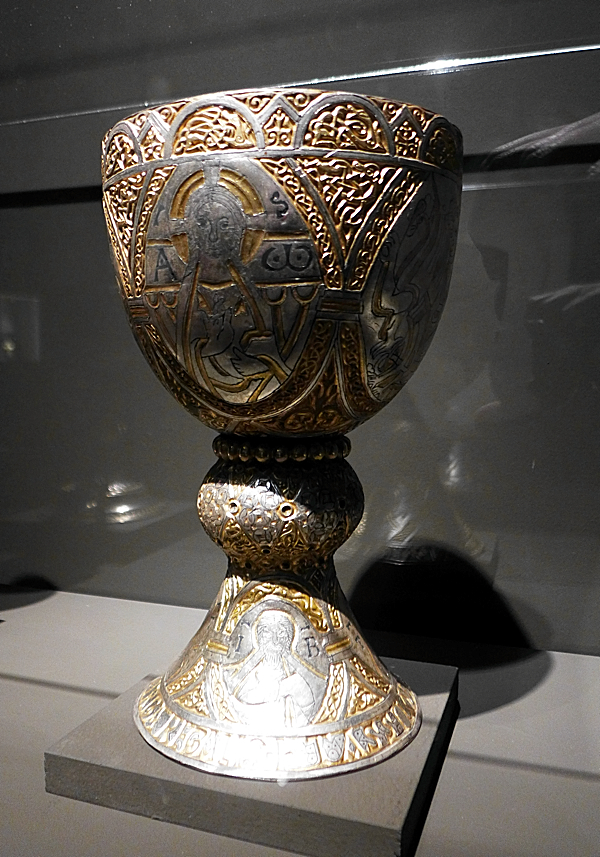
Another view

The interlinked oval medallions round the cup show Christ (together with the initials "I" and "S", for Iesus Salvator) and four Evangelist portraits, each Evangelist with his symbol. Round the base are icons of the Virgin Mary, John the Baptist, and, according to an uncertain interpretation, the Lombard queen Theodolinda. The interlace decoration which covers most of the rest of the exterior contains some animals. Around the foot is the Latin inscription: TASSILO DUX FORTIS + LIVTPIRG VIRGA REGALIS.

The chalice is an outstanding and original object, possibly made by Northumbrian craftsmen, decorated with Hiberno-Saxon ornament typical of the period. The style is more typical of the Anglo-Saxon rather than Irish component of this hybrid style. There is evidence that monks themselves were trained as goldsmiths in the insular period, like St. Dunstan, a 10th-century Archbishop of Canterbury, and Salzburg for example, was a centre of the Anglo-Saxon mission.

The care and artistry with which it was worked and the rich decoration show that it was the product of the highest craftsmanship of the day. Although church synods held in the 8th and 9th centuries expressly prohibited the use of copper and bronze for use in consecrated chalices, this is one of a few surviving examples of such vessels from that time.

The character of the ornamentation shows clearly the predominance of Insular and Anglo-Saxon influences, even though it may have been made on the Continent. Its place of manufacture is uncertain, and it may have been produced in northern Italy, but Mondsee or Salzburg have also been suggested. Together with the Ardagh Chalice and the Derrynaflan Chalice and associated paten, all of Irish origin, it is one of the most impressive of the very few surviving large pieces of Insular church metalwork – most examples of the style are secular brooches. Anglo-Saxon metalwork was highly regarded as far away as Italy, and especially noted for its engraving, but even fewer pieces have survived than from Ireland.

== Bibliography ==
- G. Haseloff (1951), Der Tassilokelch. Münchner Beiträge zur Vor- und Frühgeschichte 1. Munich.
- G. Haseloff (1977), "Zum Stand der Forschung zum Tassilokelch." In: Jung, H. (Hrsg), Baiernzeit in Oberösterreich. Von Severin zu Tassilo. Linz.
- V. Bierbrauer (1988), "Liturgische Gerätschaften aus Baiern und seinen Nachbarregionen in Spätantike und frühem Mittelalter". In: Dannheimer, H. (Hrsg.): Die Bajuwaren. Von Severin bis Tassilo 488–788. Munich.
