= Crantz =

Crantz may refer to:

- Creontius (fl. 771–786), Bavarian official and historian
- Heinrich Johann Nepomuk von Crantz (1722–1799), Austrian botanist and a physician
