= Chalice =

Ecclesiastical footed drinking cup, often with a central knop

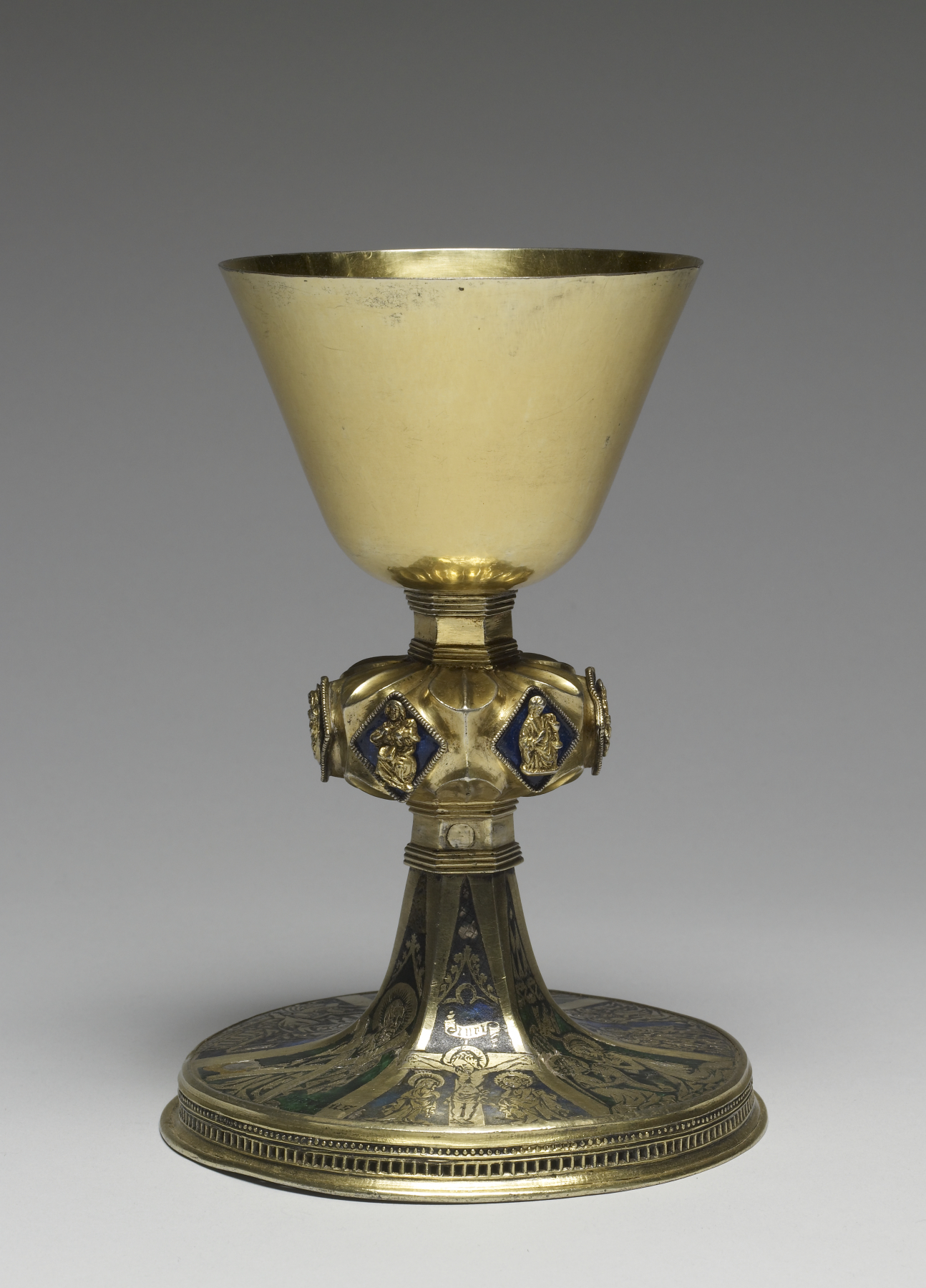
Late medieval chalice in silver-gilt with enamels of Saints and Scenes from the Life of Christ

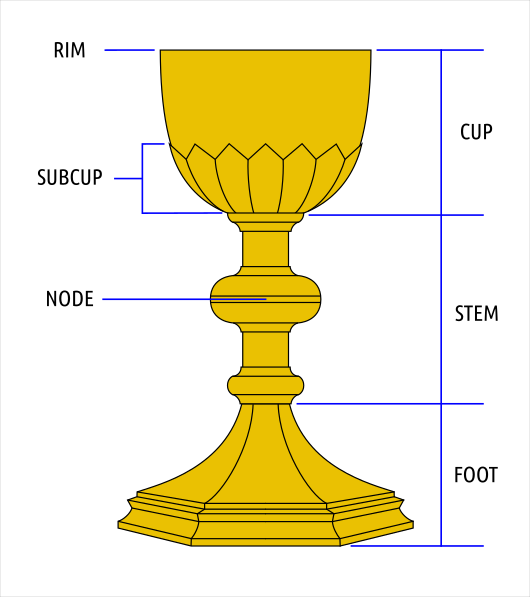
Diagram showing the parts of a liturgical chalice.

A chalice (from Latin calix 'cup', taken from the Ancient Greek κύλιξ (kylix) 'cup') is a drinking cup raised on a stem with a foot or base. Although it is a technical archaeological term, in modern parlance the word is now used almost exclusively for the cups used in Christian liturgy as part of a service of the Eucharist, such as a Catholic mass. These are normally made of metal, but neither the shape nor the material is a requirement. Most have no handles, and in recent centuries the cup at the top has usually been a simple flared shape.

Historically, the same shape was used for elite secular vessels, and many individual examples have served both secular and liturgical uses over their history, for example the Lacock Cup and Royal Gold Cup, both late medieval cups. Cups owned by churches were much more likely to survive, as secular drinkware in precious metal was usually melted down when it fell out of fashion.

The same general cup shape is also called a goblet (from Old French gobellet, diminutive of gobel 'cup'), normally in secular contexts. This remains current as a term for wineglasses and other stemware, most of which have a goblet shape, with Paris goblet as a trade term for basic rounded wineglasses. The modern French term gobelet has developed differently, and is used for different shapes such as the Gobelet André Falquet and Roman Lyon Cup, both stemless.

== Religious use ==
=== Christian ===
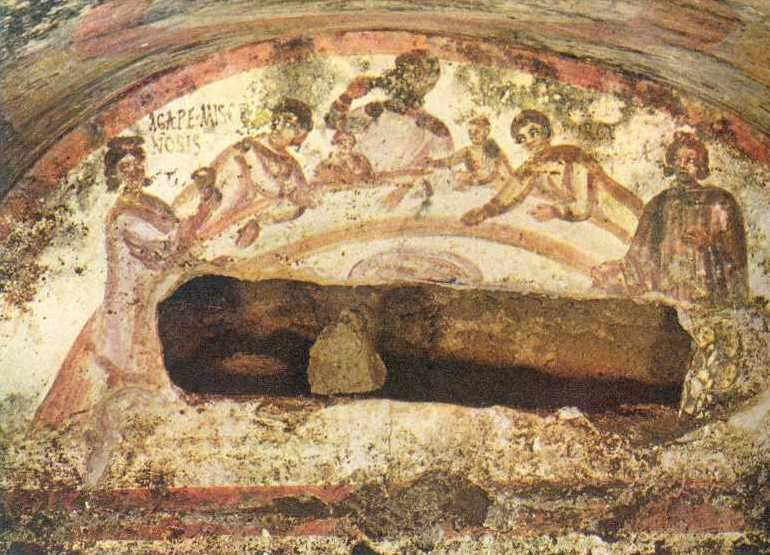
Fresco of a female figure holding a chalice at an early Christian Agape feast. Catacomb of Saints Marcellinus and Peter, Via Labicana, Rome

The ancient Roman calix was a cup or drinking vessel, probably rather vaguely defined as to its exact shape. But most consisted of a bowl on a stem over a foot or base; handles were probably optional. The Greek kylix, at least as defined by modern authorities, was a far wider and more shallow bowl on some sort of stem, with two horizontal handles. It is the most common wine cup seen in paintings of symposium drinking parties. Gradually the term became more or less restricted to cups for liturgical use.

In Roman Catholicism, Eastern Orthodox Church, Oriental Orthodoxy, Anglicanism, Lutheranism and some other Christian denominations, a chalice is a standing cup used to hold sacramental wine during the Eucharist (also called the Lord's Supper or Holy Communion). Chalices are often made of precious metal, and they are sometimes richly enamelled and jewelled. Generally they have no handles.

Chalices have been used since the early Church. Because of Jesus' command to his disciples to "Do this in remembrance of me." (Luke 22:19), and Paul's account of the Eucharistic rite in 1 Corinthians 11:24–25, the celebration of the Eucharist became central to Christian liturgy. Naturally, the vessels used in this important act of worship were highly decorated and treated with great respect. A number of early examples of chalices have a large bowl and two vertical handles, reflecting classical cup shapes such as the kantharos and skyphos. Over time, the size of the bowl diminished and the base became larger for better stability. Eventually, official church regulations dictated the construction, blessing, and treatment of chalices. Some religious traditions still require that the chalice, at least on the inside of the cup, be gold-plated.

In Western Christianity, chalices will often have a knop, pommel or node where the stem meets the cup to make the elevation easier. In Roman Catholicism, chalices of recent centuries tend to have quite narrow cups. Roman Catholic priests will often receive chalices from members of their families when first ordained.

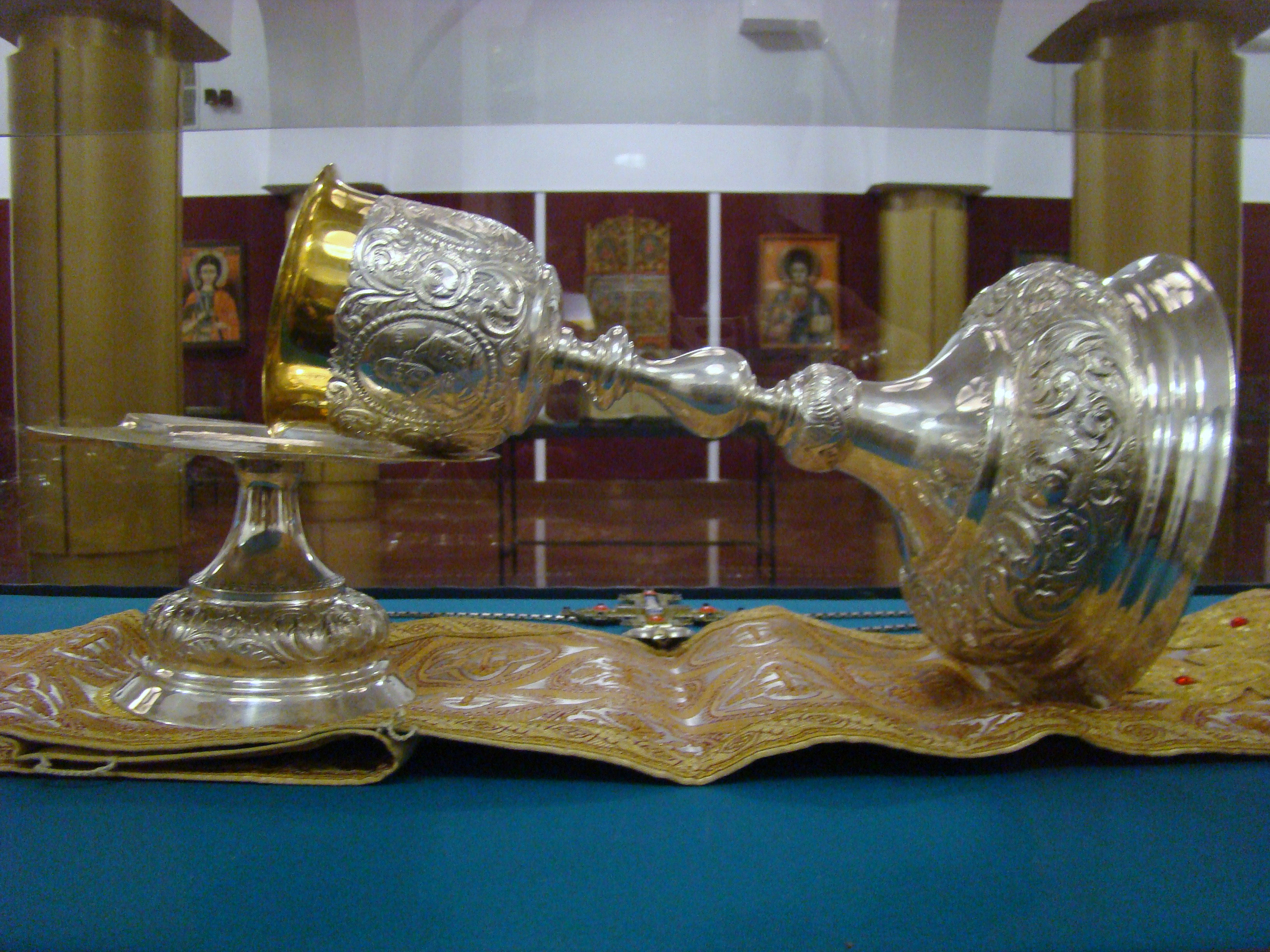
Silver chalice in the museum of the Romanian Orthodox Archbishopy of the Vad, Feleac, and Cluj

In Eastern Christianity (Oriental Orthodox, Eastern Orthodox and Eastern Catholic churches), chalices will often have icons enameled or engraved on them, as well as a cross. In Orthodoxy and Eastern Catholicism, all communicants receive both the Body of Christ and the Blood of Christ. To accomplish this, a portion of the Lamb (host) is placed in the chalice, and then the faithful receive Communion on a spoon. For this reason, eastern chalices tend to have larger, rounded cups. In the Russian Orthodox Church, the faithful will often kiss the "foot" (base) of the chalice after receiving Holy Communion. In other traditions, they will kiss the cup. Although Orthodox monks are not permitted to hold personal possessions, the canons permit a hieromonk (i.e., a monk who has been ordained to the priesthood) to keep a chalice and other vessels necessary to celebrate the Divine Liturgy.

In the early and medieval church, when a deacon was ordained, he would be handed a chalice during the service as a sign of his ministry. In the West the deacon carries the chalice to the altar at the offertory; in the East, the priest carries the chalice and the deacon carries the paten (diskos). Only wine, water and a portion of the Host are permitted to be placed in the chalice, and it may not be used for any profane purpose.

The chalice is considered to be one of the most sacred vessels in Christian liturgical worship, and it is often blessed before use. In the Roman Catholic Church and some Anglo-Catholic churches, it was the custom for a chalice to be consecrated by being anointed with chrism, and this consecration could only be performed by a bishop or abbot (only for use within his own monastery). Among the Eastern Churches, there are varying practices regarding blessing. In some traditions, the very act of celebrating the Sacred Mysteries (Eucharist) is the only blessing necessary; in others, there is a special rite of blessing. In some Eastern traditions, this blessing may be done only by a bishop, in some it may be done by a priest.

==== The Holy Chalice ====
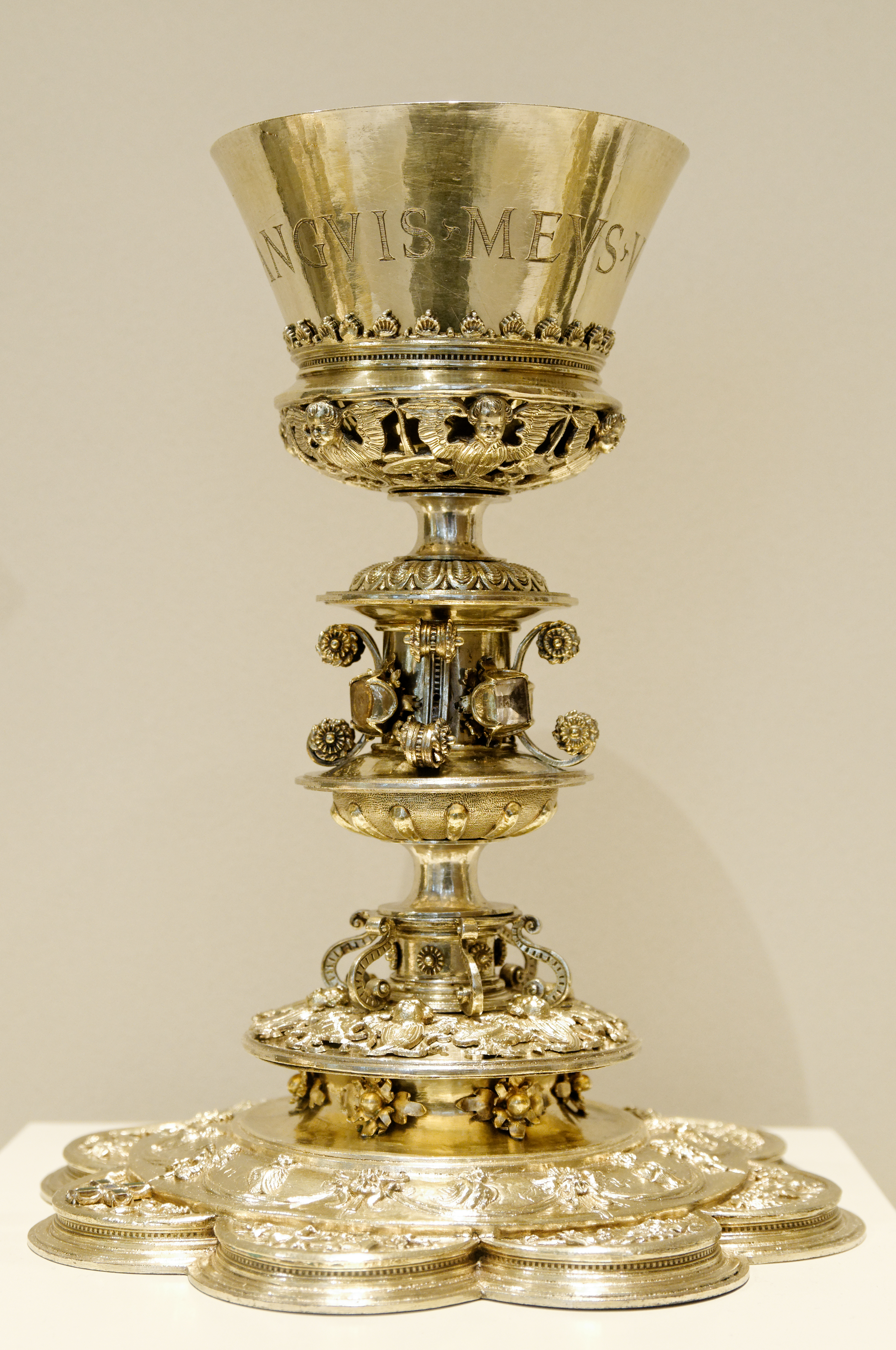
Chalice with the inscription: "Sanguis meus vere est potus" ('My blood is drink indeed'; John 6:55), made for the church St John the Baptist in Salinas, Spain. Silver-gilt, 1549

In Christian tradition, the Holy Chalice is the vessel which Jesus used at the Last Supper to serve the wine. New Testament texts make no mention of the cup except within the context of the Last Supper and give no significance whatsoever to the object itself. Herbert Thurston in the Catholic Encyclopedia 1908 concluded that "No reliable tradition has been preserved to us regarding the vessel used by Christ at the Last Supper. In the sixth and seventh centuries pilgrims to Jerusalem were led to believe that the actual chalice was still venerated in the church of the Holy Sepulchre, having within it the sponge which was presented to Our Saviour on Calvary." Several surviving standing cups of precious materials are identified in local traditions as the Chalice.

==== Holy Grail ====
An entirely different and pervasive tradition concerns the cup of the Last Supper. In this highly muddled though better-known version, the vessel is known as the Holy Grail. In this legend, Jesus used the cup at the Last Supper to institute the Mass. Other stories claim that Joseph of Arimathea used the cup to collect and store the blood of Christ at the Crucifixion.

=== Unitarian Universalism ===
At the opening of Unitarian Universalist worship services, many congregations light a flame inside a chalice. A flaming chalice is the most widely used symbol of Unitarianism and Unitarian Universalism (UU), and the official logo of the Unitarian Universalist Association (UUA) and other Unitarian and UU churches and societies. The design was originated by the artist Hans Deutsch, who took his inspiration from the chalices of oil burned on ancient Greek and Roman altars. It became an underground symbol in occupied Europe during World War II for assistance to help Unitarians, Jews, and other people escape Nazi persecution. The chalice is often shown surrounded by two linked rings. The two linked rings were used as an early symbol for the Unitarian Universalist Association, signifying the joining of Unitarianism and Universalism.

There is no standardized interpretation of the flaming chalice symbol. In one interpretation, the chalice is a symbol of religious freedom from the impositions of doctrine by a hierarchy and openness to participation by all; the flame is interpreted as a memorial to those throughout history who sacrificed their lives for the cause of religious liberty. In another interpretation, the flaming chalice resembles a cross, symbolic of the Christian roots of Unitarian Universalism.

=== Wicca ===
In Wicca, a chalice, as a feminine principle, is often used in combination with the Athame (ceremonial black-handled knife), as male principle. Combining the two evokes the act of procreation, as a symbol of universal creativity. This is a symbol of the Great Rite in Wiccan rituals. A chalice is also used in the Small Rite.

=== Neo-Paganism ===
Some other forms of Neo-Paganism make use of chalices in their rituals as well. A chalice may be placed on an altar or on the ground. The chalice may contain wine, whiskey, water, or other liquids. It is used to represent the genitalia of the goddess or female deity.

=== Rastafarian ===
Rastafaris sometimes smoke ganja in a chalice (waterpipe or bong) during an activity called reasoning intended to put participants in touch with peaceful feelings, unity, and "consciousness."

== Poisoned chalice ==
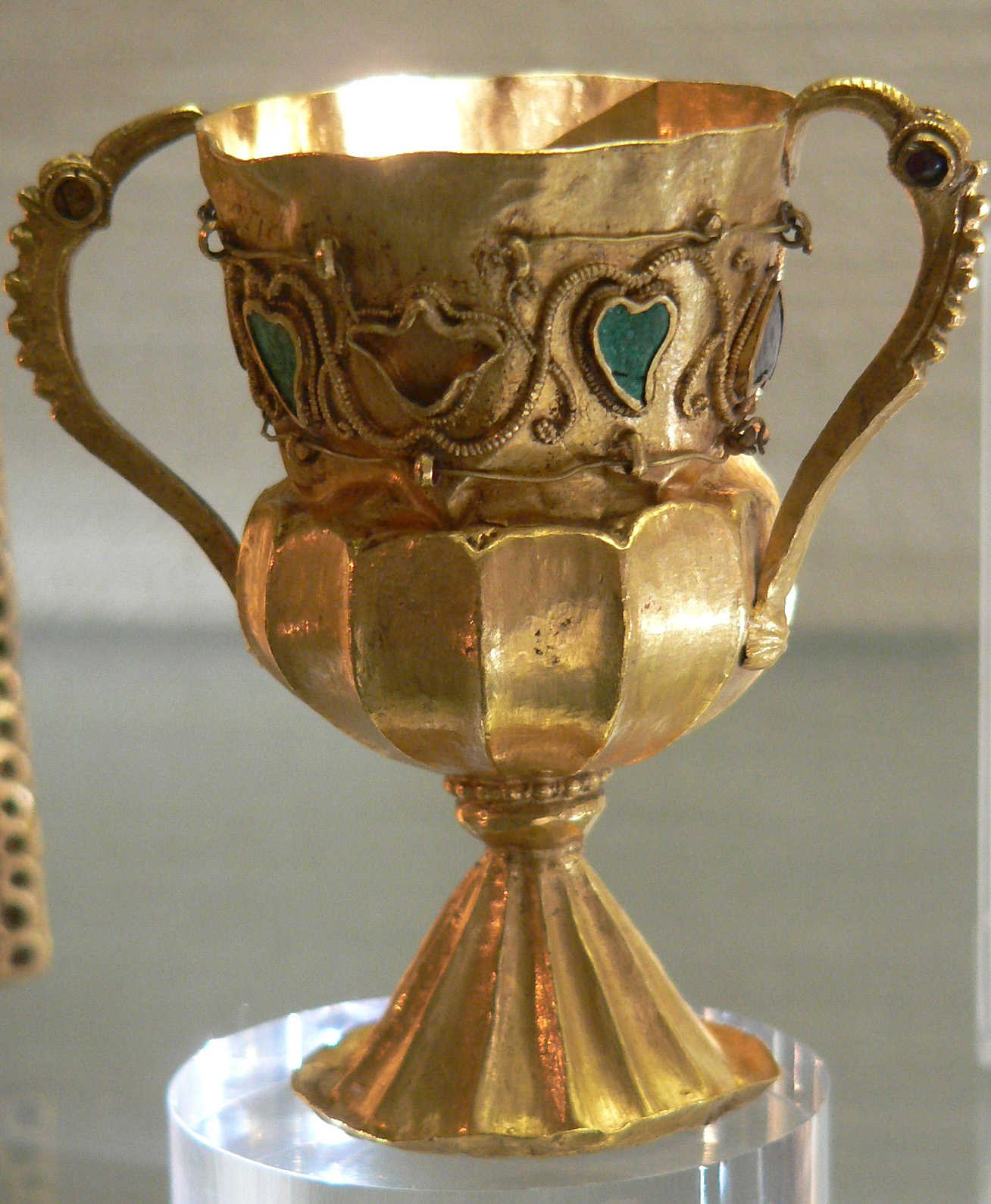
Treasure of Gourdon, 6th century AD

The term "poisoned chalice" is applied to a thing or situation which appears to be good when it is received or experienced by someone, but then becomes or is found to be bad. The idea was referred to by Benedict of Nursia in one of his exorcisms, found on the Saint Benedict Medal: Vade retro Satana! Nunquam suade mihi vana! Sunt mala quae libas. Ipse venena bibas! ('Begone Satan! Never tempt me with your vanities! What you offer me is evil. Drink the poison yourself!').
William Shakespeare uses the expression in Act I Scene VII of Macbeth. It occurs in the opening soliloquy of the scene when Macbeth is considering the ramifications of the murder he is plotting.

But in these cases
We still have judgment here; that we but teach
Bloody instructions, which, being taught, return
To plague the inventor: this even-handed justice
Commends the ingredients of our poison'd chalice
To our own lips. [1.7.7–12]

After accepting 1988's UN Security Council Resolution 598, which called for a final ceasefire between Iran and Iraq (and, thus, an end to the Iran–Iraq War), Supreme Leader of Iran Ruhollah Khomeini said that his acceptance was "more deadly than drinking from a poisoned chalice."

== Heraldry ==
The use of chalices as heraldic devices is not unusual, especially in ecclesiastical heraldry. A number of cities and regions also make use of the chalice. For instance, the coat of arms of the municipality of Fanas in the district of Prättigau/Davos in the Swiss canton of Graubünden bears a gold chalice on a solid blue background. The coat of arms of Staufen im Breisgau contains the three golden chalices (i.e. drei staufen in ancient German) of the Lords of Staufen, advocates of the monastery of St. Trudpert. A golden chalice (or in some instances three or five) on blue background has been used as coat of arms for the Kingdom of Galicia since at least the late Middle Ages, and is still central in its renewed heraldry.

== Gallery ==
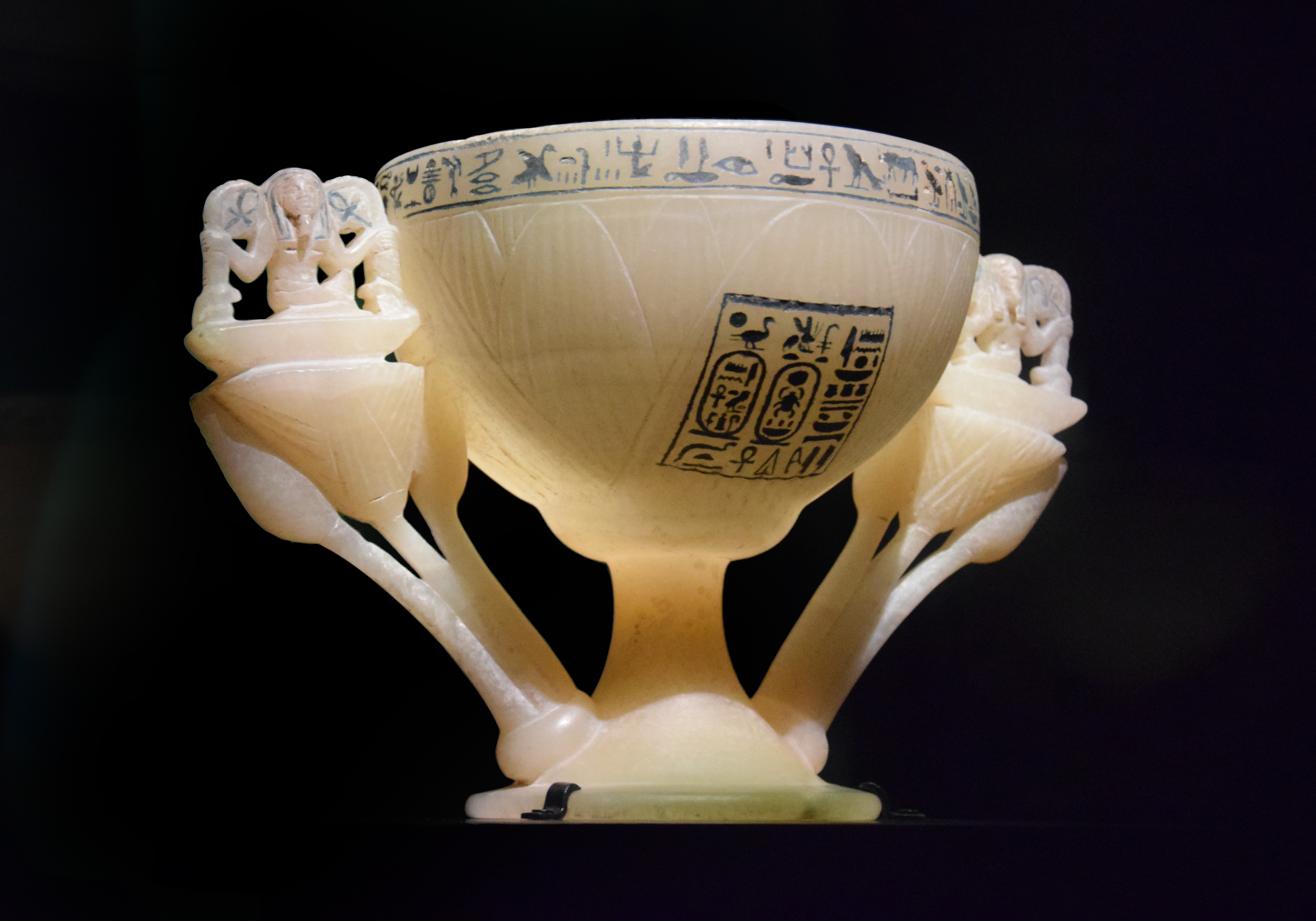
Alabaster chalice found in Tutankhamun's tomb, 14th century BC

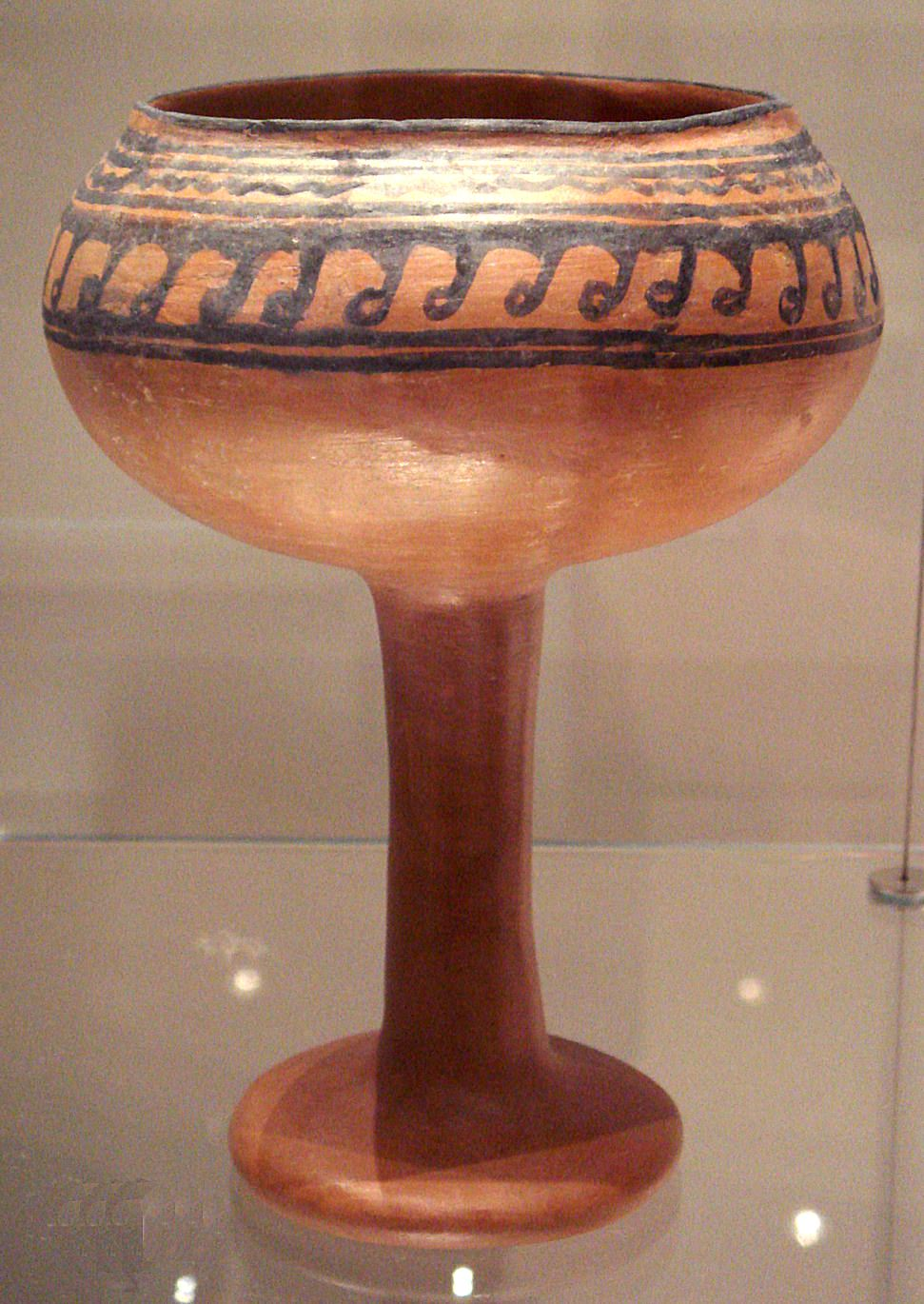
Ceramic goblet from Navdatoli, Malwa, 1300 BCE; Malwa culture

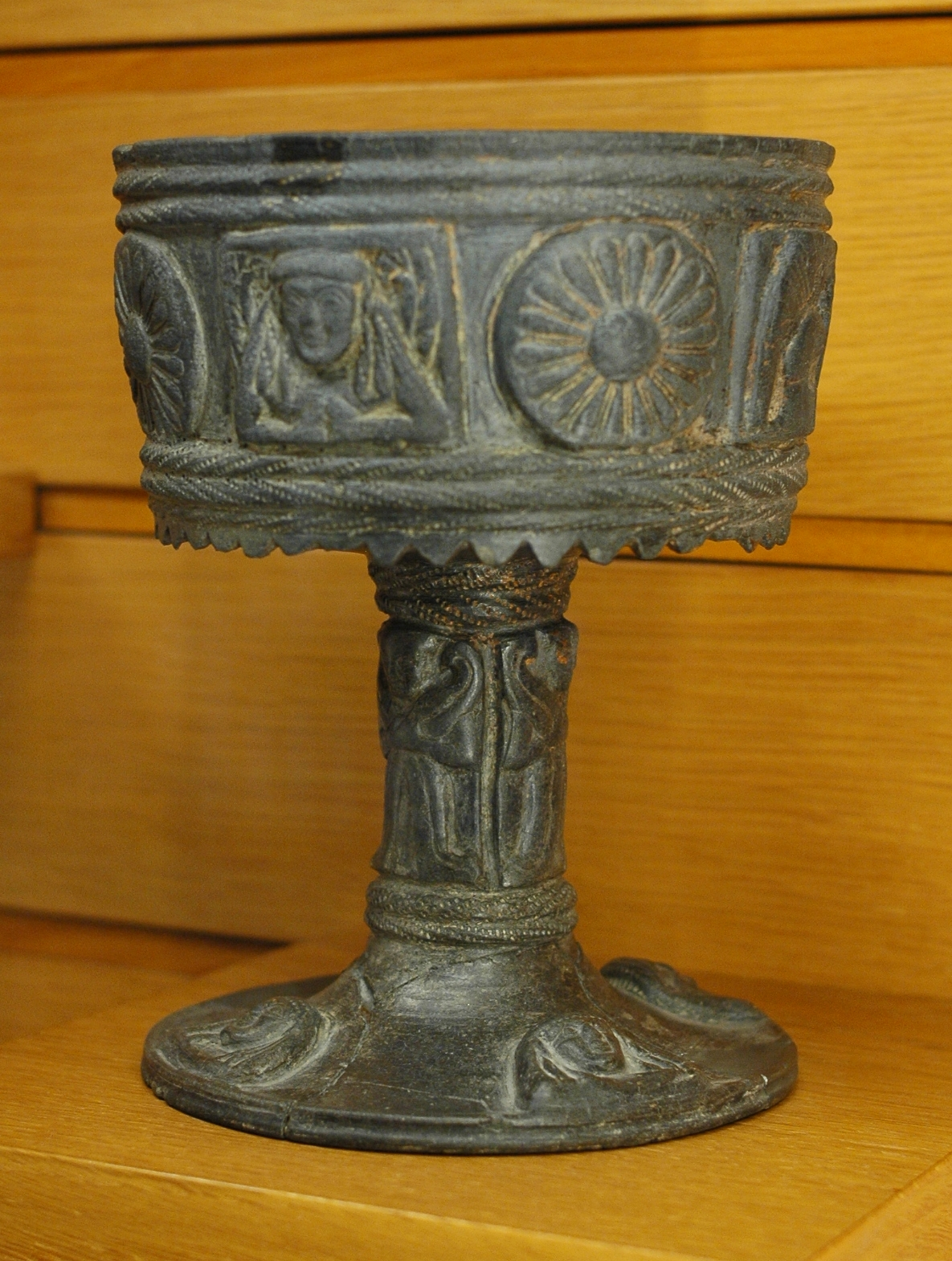
Etruscan bucchero "chalice", early 6th century BC

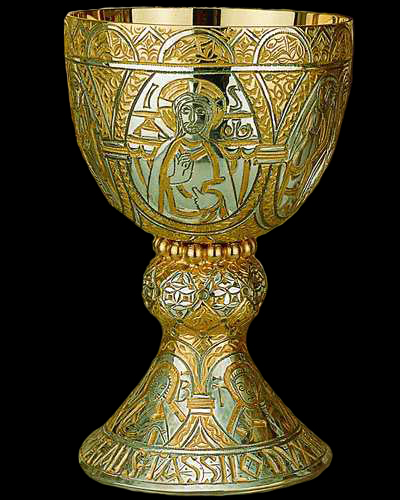
Tassilo Chalice, c. 780 (reproduction)

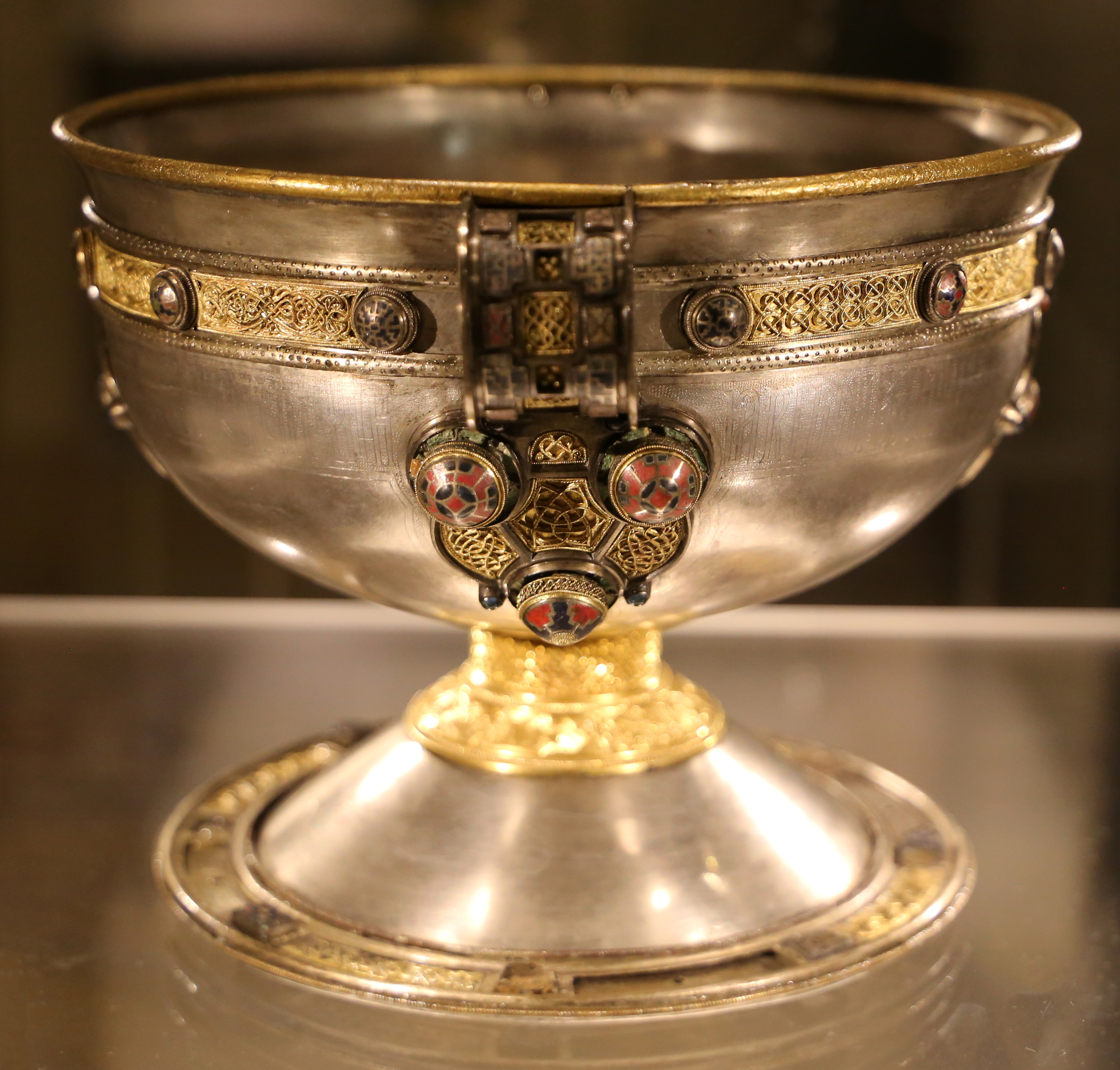
Ardagh Chalice, 8th century

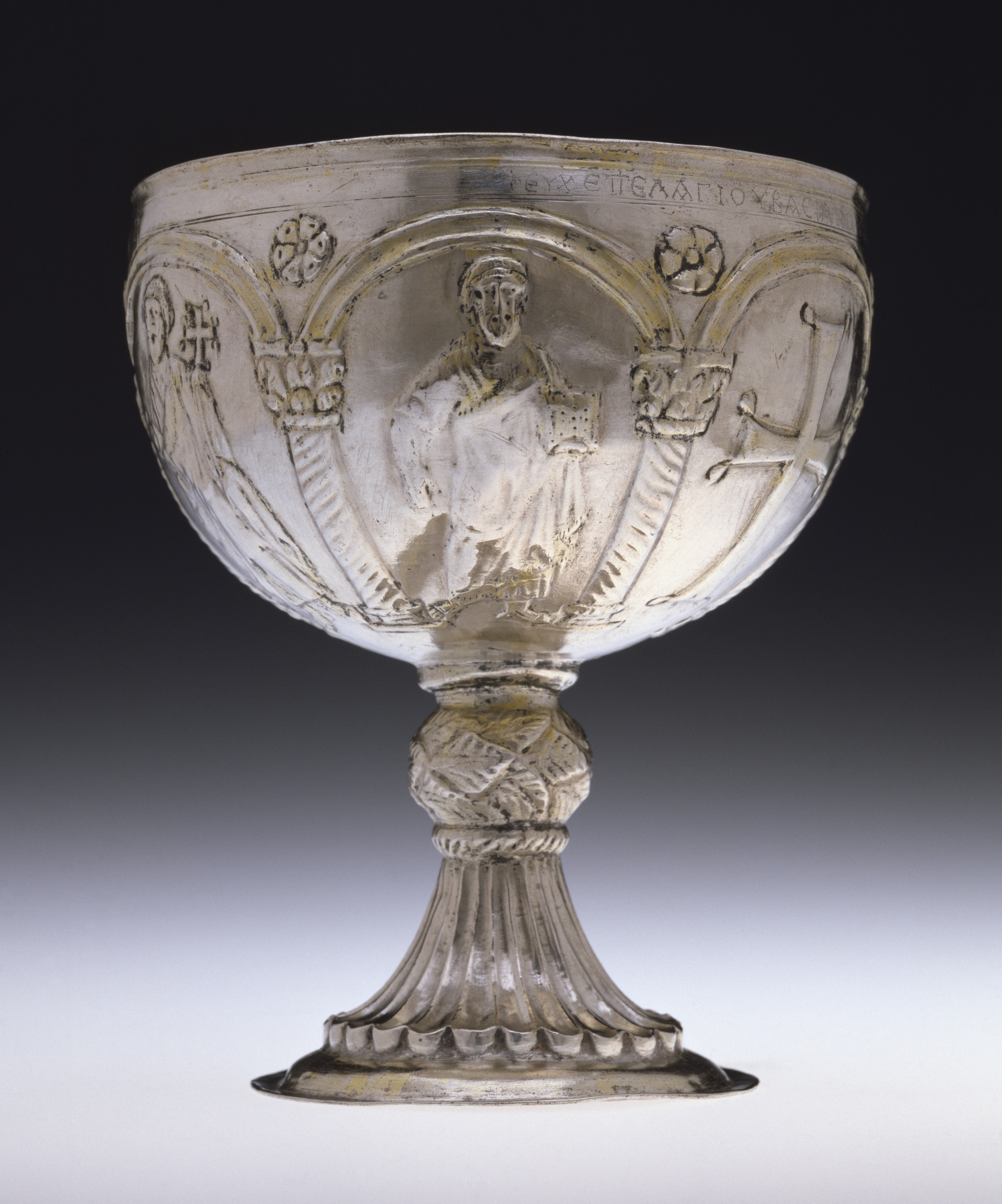
Chalice with Apostles Venerating the Cross, Byzantine Empire (Walters Art Museum)

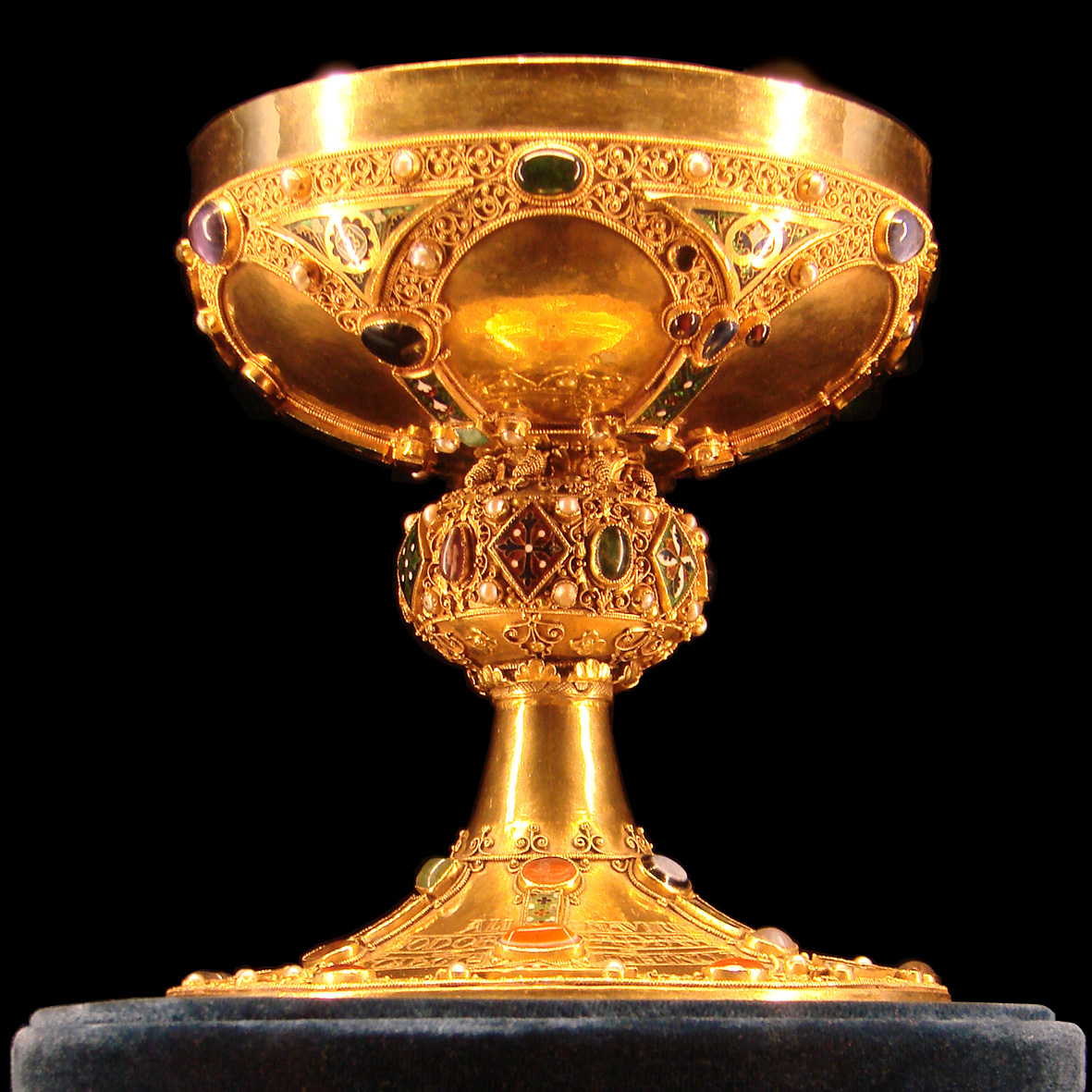
Palais du Tau, treasure of the Cathedral of Reims, 12th century

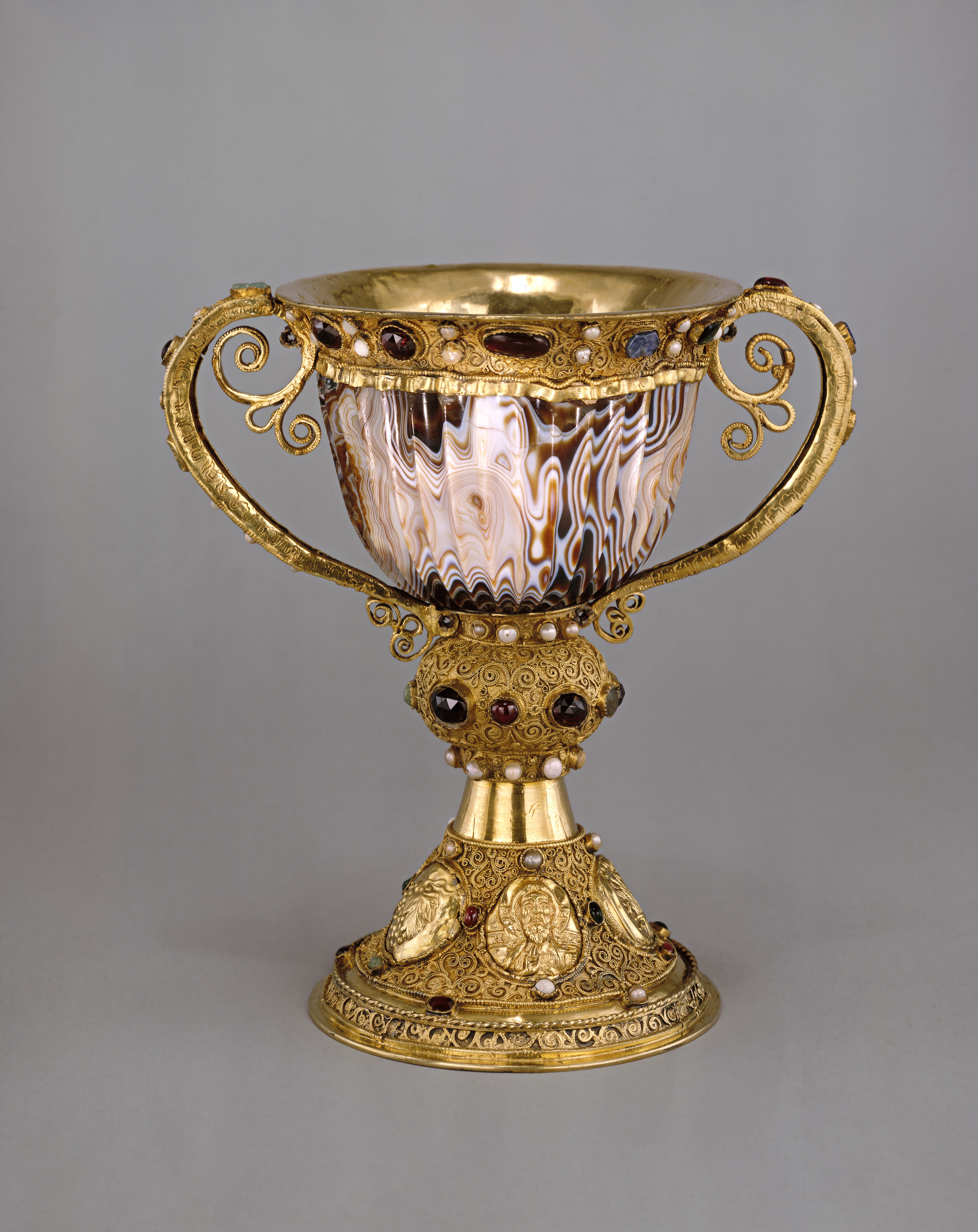
Chalice of Abbot Suger of Saint-Denis, Roman cup, 12th-century mounts, National Gallery of Art

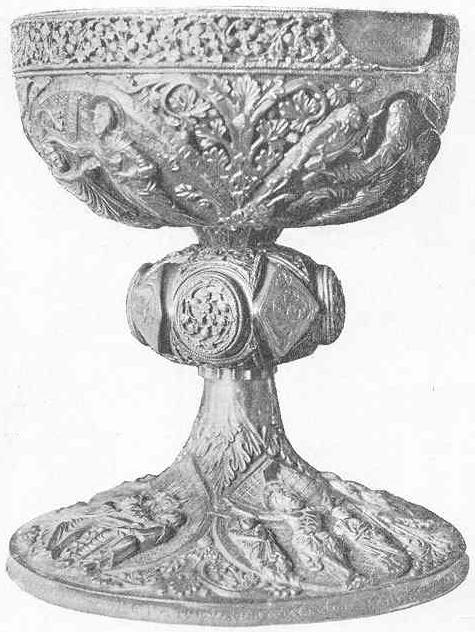
Chalice from Borgå Cathedral (Porvoo Cathedral), c. 1250

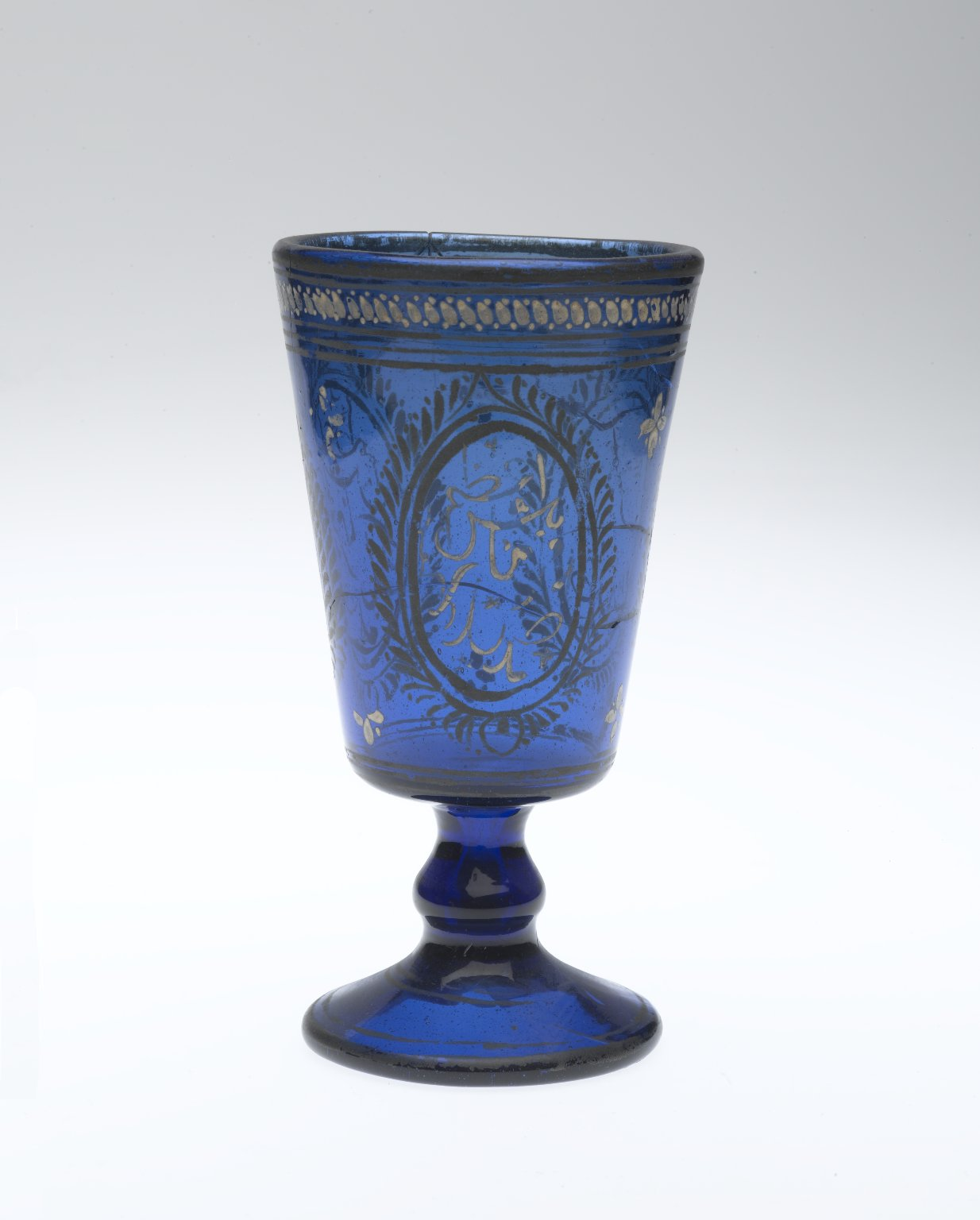
Wine Goblet, mid-19th century. Qajar dynasty. Brooklyn Museum.

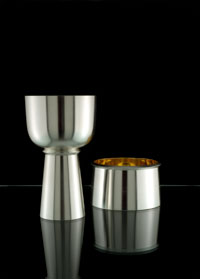
Modern chalice with paten

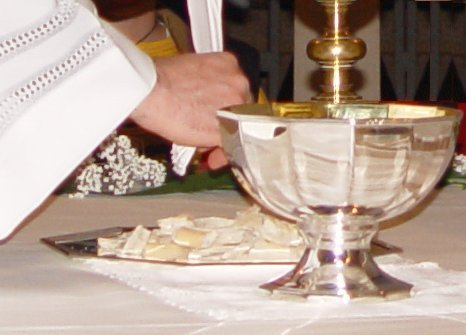
Large modern chalice and paten

== Other usage ==
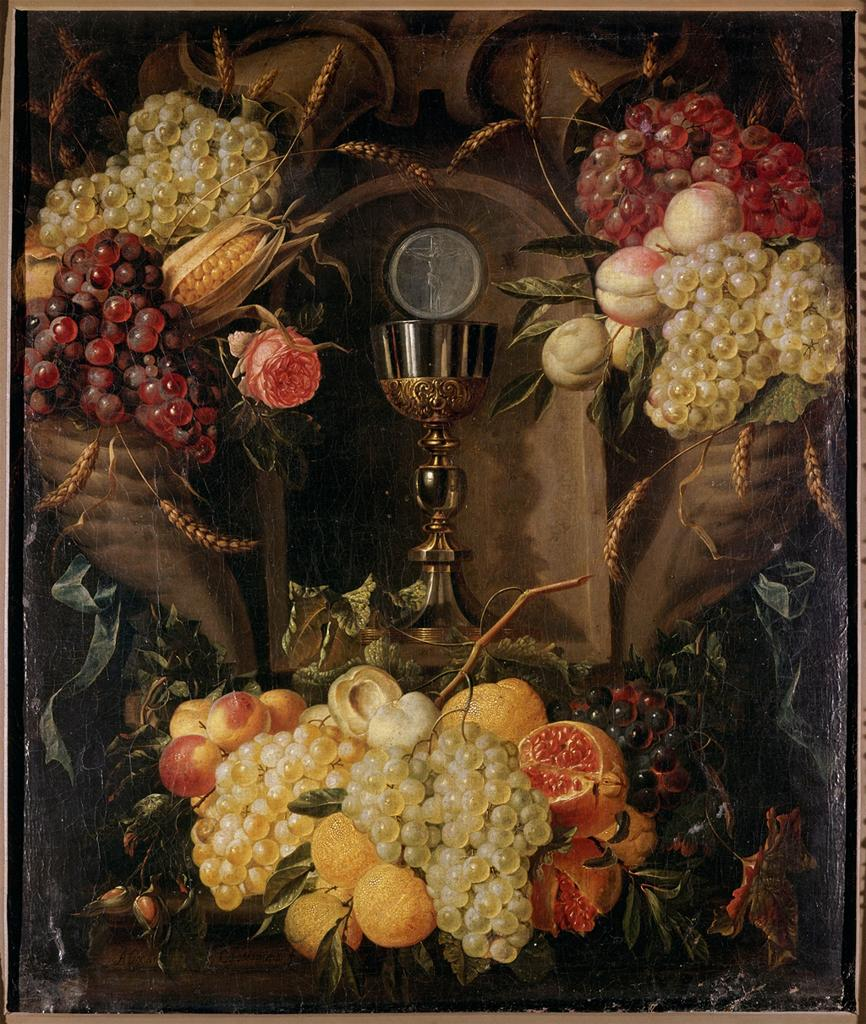
Allegory of the Eucharist by Alexander Coosemans

=== Québec ===
In French-Canadian culture, particularly in and around Quebec, the use of the names of holy objects such as "câlice" (a variation of calice, which is the French word for chalice) can be an alternate form of cursing. Somewhat equivalent to the American word "goddam" or the phrase "God damn it", the use of "câlice" or "tabarnak" (a variation of tabernacle) as an interjection is not uncommon in Quebec. For example: "Câlice! I forgot to lock the front door" or muttering "tabarnak" under one's breath after they get a flat tire. This is presumably a derivation of "taking the Lord's name in vain".

=== Czech Republic ===
With reference to the Hussite movement in the Kingdom of Bohemia, besides religious use, the chalice also became one of the unofficial national symbols of the Czechs. It is frequently used in Czech national symbolism and it is part of many historical banners.

== See also ==
- Ablution in Christianity
- Ardagh Chalice
- Chalice of Crossdrum
- Ciborium
- Communion cup
- Communion under both kinds
- Corporal (liturgy)
- Derrynaflan Chalice
- Holy Grail
- Intinction
- Paten
- Tassilo Chalice
- The Oxburgh Chalice
- The Silver Chalice
- Treasure of Gourdon
