= Basilica of Saint Martin, Tours =

Basilica located in Indre-et-Loire, in France

Coordinates: 47°23′35″N 0°40′58″E

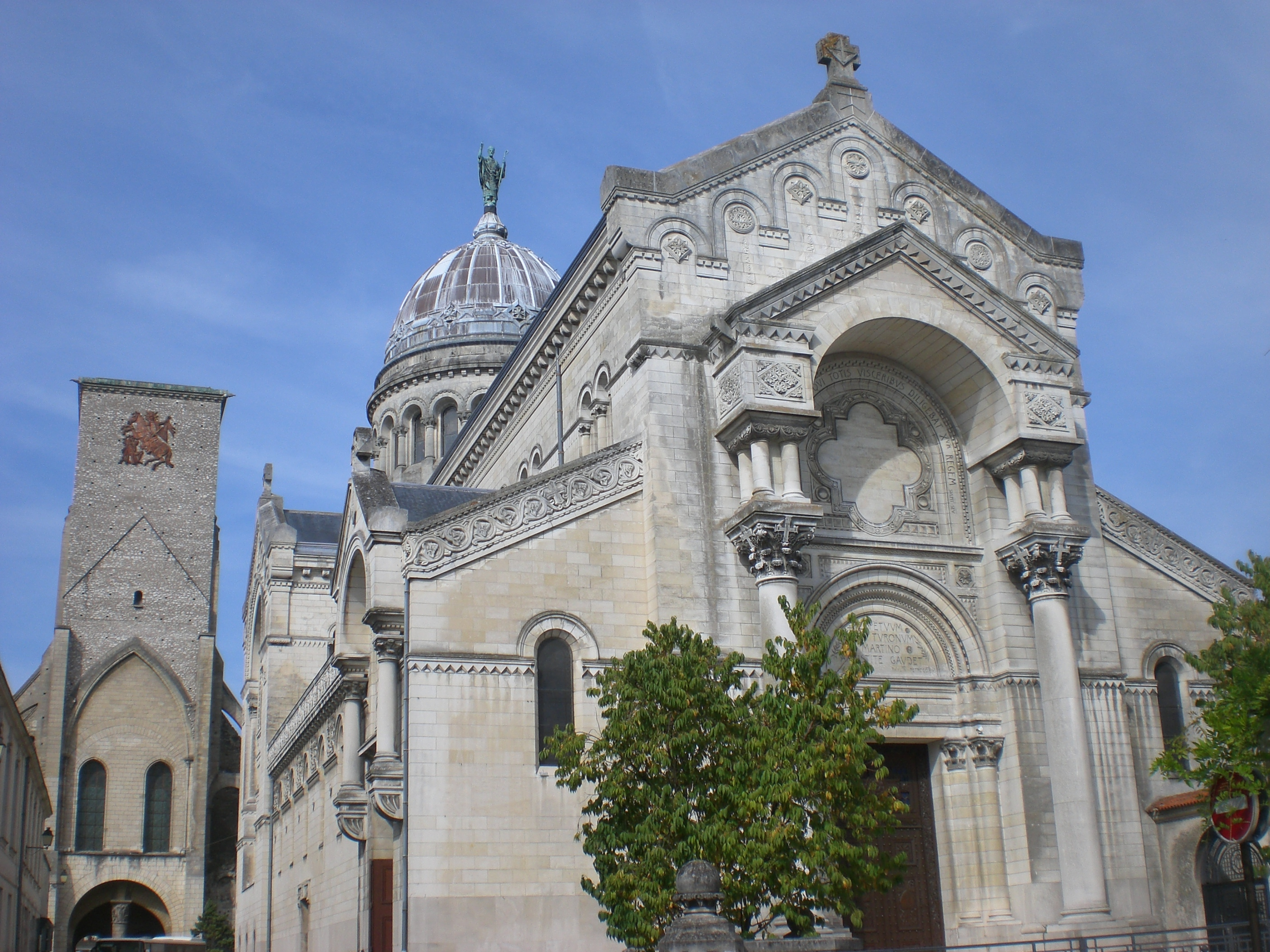
The new Basilica

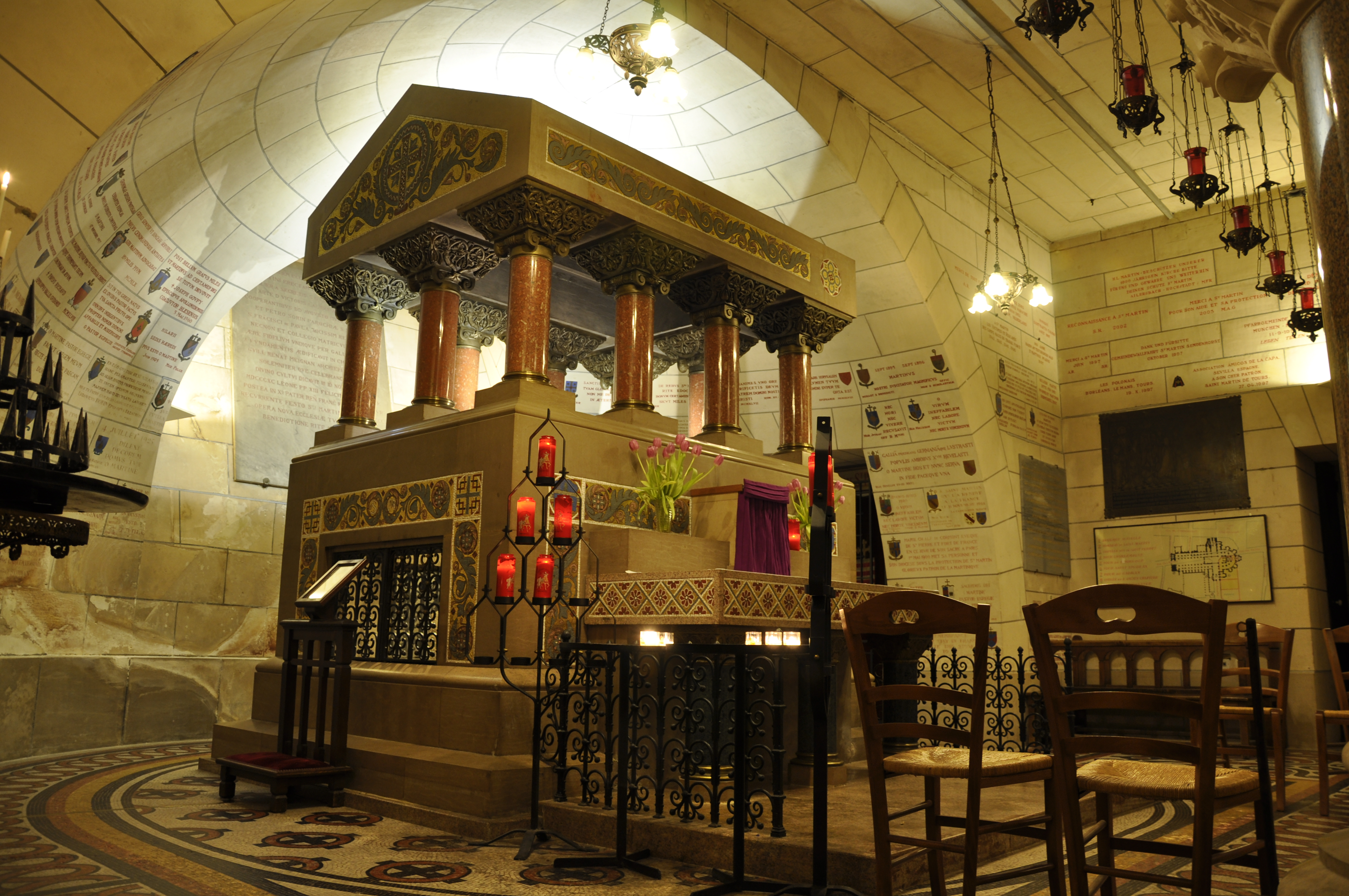
Tomb of Saint Martin

The Basilica of Saint Martin is a Catholic basilica dedicated to Saint Martin of Tours, over whose tomb it was built. It is located in Tours, France.

The first basilica was established here in the 5th century (consecrated in 471) on the site of an earlier chapel. It was at first served by a community of monks under an abbot, the Abbot of Saint Martin, who between 796 and 804 was Alcuin, the adviser of Charlemagne. Shortly before this the monastic establishment was changed to a collegiate church manned by a community of canons, but the office and title of abbot persisted.

The medieval basilica was completely demolished during the French Revolution. The present church was built between 1886 and 1924 by French architect Victor Laloux in a Neo-Byzantine style, on part of the site of the original basilica which was repurchased by the Church. It was dedicated on 4 July 1925.

== Medieval history ==
The Abbey which developed around the shrine of Saint Martin at Tours became one of the most prominent and influential establishments in medieval France. Charlemagne awarded the position of Abbot to his friend and adviser Alcuin. At this time the abbot could travel between Tours and the court at Trier in Germany and always stay overnight at one of his own properties. It was at Tours that Alcuin's scriptorium (a room in monasteries devoted to the copying of manuscripts by monastic scribes) developed Carolingian minuscule, the clear round hand that made manuscripts far more legible.

In later times the abbey was destroyed by fire on several occasions and ransacked by Norman Vikings in 853 and in 903. It burned again in 994, and was rebuilt by Hervé de Buzançais, treasurer of Saint Martin, an effort that took 20 years to complete. Expanded to accommodate the crowds of pilgrims and to attract them, the shrine of St. Martin of Tours became a major stopping-point on pilgrimages. Between 1354 and 1368, a new wall was constructed to encompass the basilica and the city of Tours. In 1453 the remains of Saint Martin were transferred to a magnificent new reliquary donated by Charles VII of France and Agnès Sorel.

During the French Wars of Religion, the basilica was sacked by the Protestant Huguenots in 1562. It was disestablished during the French Revolution. It was deconsecrated, used as a stable, then utterly demolished. Its dressed stones were sold in 1802 after two streets were built across the site, to ensure the abbey would not be reconstructed.

== Current basilica ==
In 1860 excavations by Leo Dupont (1797–1876) established the dimensions of the former abbey and recovered some fragments of architecture. The tomb of Saint Martin was rediscovered on 14 December 1860, which aided in the 19th-century revival of the popular devotion to St. Martin.

After the radical Paris Commune of 1871, there was a resurgence of conservative Catholic piety, and the church decided to build a basilica to Saint Martin. They selected Victor Laloux as architect. He eschewed Gothic for a mix of Romanesque and Byzantine, sometimes defined as neo-Byzantine. The new Basilique Saint-Martin was erected on a portion of its former site, which was purchased from the owners. Started in 1886, the church was consecrated on 4 July 1925.

== Abbots ==
In the following list, all dates are floruits:

- Leo (before 525)
- Egiric (674)
- Guntramn (720)
- Autland (735)
- Gundolaic (735–742)
- Teutsind (before 774)
- Wulfard (774)
- Ithier (774–790)
- Alcuin (796–804)
- Gulfard (806)
- Fridugis (806–834)
- Teuto (834)
- Adalard (845)
- Vivian (845–849)
- Hilduin (860)
- Louis (862)
- Hucbert (862)
- Ingelwin (864–866)
- Robert I the Strong (866)
- Hugh I (867–879)
- Odo (885–887)
- Fulk the Venerable (887)
- Robert II (894–907)
- Hugh II the Great (923–954)
- Hugh III Capet (972)

When Hugh Capet became king in 987, the abbacy, which had long been in lay hands, was united to the royal office.
