= Chalice of Crossdrum =

Lost liturgical vessel from Ireland

The Chalice of Crossdrum, before it was lost, with accompanying paten.

The Chalice of Crossdrum is a lost 18th century Roman Catholic liturgical vessel from Ireland.

== Physical description ==
The chalice itself is described as,

a small silver vessel, less than seven inches in height, of graceful proportions, with an hexagonal base. Three of the sides of the base bear symbolic decorations, crudely etched. The front shows a figure of the Crucifixion, from which the cross is curiously omitted, surrounded by the instruments of the Passion and surmounted by an oddly conceived moon and stars. One of the sides shows a device representing a branch with acorns growing on it; the device on the other side is more difficult to classify. Around the base is the inscription in the quaint lettering of the period: 'Ora pro Stephano Cook et Elizabetha eius uxore et Maria filia 1635' (Pray for Stephen Cooke and Elizabeth his wife and Mary his daughter.) The word "pro," in the inscription, is almost obliterated, and the chasing at one spot on the boss is almost worn away by the contact of the thumbs of many celebrants in the elevation of the chalice; and the rim of the base at the back is worn completely away.

== History ==
The Chalice of Crossdrum was found in 1750 in Crossdrum, near Oldcastle, County Meath, Ireland. The chalice was found in a cave, beside a priest's skeleton, along with other liturgical items, including a chasuble, an altar-stone, a crucifix, and candlesticks. Given its location, scene of discovery, and relative dates of the artifacts, scholars generally concur that the discovered priest was likely a Jesuit who covertly provided the sacraments to local Catholics during the Cromwellian period, when such activities were proscribed by the state. The man who made the discovery, Hugh Reilly, handed the discovery over to his brother, the Rev. Bartholomew Reilly, a parish priest in Co. Meath. The priest's skeleton was sacramentally buried, and the location of the other discovered items remains unknown.

The chalice and paten were subsequently passed from Rev. Bartholomew Reilly to Fr. Owen Reilly, the former's uncle, on the event of his death in 1782. Fr. Owen Reilly died in 1784. Debate surrounds the location of the chalice after Fr. Owen Reilly's ownership.

The chalice resurfaced in 1832, under the possession of Rev. George McDermot, parish priest of Oldcastle. The chalice was kept in the parish, coming under the ownership of Father George Leonard, the successor parish priest. It was at this time that the chalice took on a mythical element, supposedly granting the keeper longevity of life. Fr. Leonard died in 1877, at the age of 85. The chalice then passed to Leonard's nephew, Fr. Thomas Fagan, parish priest of Rathconnell, County Westmeath. Fr. Fagan died in 1886, and the chalice passed to Fr. Fagan's nephew, the Very Rev. Thomas Gaffney in Rutland, Vermont. Gaffney picked up the chalice in Ireland, after a conflict of ownership that required local diocesan intervention.

Since his acquisition of the chalice, Fr. Gaffney used the vessel in every celebration of the Feast of St Patrick, until his death in 1906. Fr. Gaffney, in his will, left the chalice in the hands of Fr. James A. Taaffe, S.J., of Fordham University in New York. Since Fr. Taaffe's ownership, the location of the chalice remains unconfirmed, some speculating it remains in the hands of the aforementioned Jesuit university, among Taaffe's descendants in Long Island, Staten Island, or elsewhere.
