= Teutsind =

French cleric

Teutsind (fl. 735–742) was a Frankish cleric, abbot of St Martin, Tours, and of Fontenelle Abbey.

Charles Martel appointed him to these offices, during his tenure of which Teutsind distinguished himself by conveying abbey properties to members of the local nobility in order to ensure their support for the king.

He is generally considered a poor abbot, in that he pursued the king's political agenda to the detriment of the abbeys in his charge, running down their finances and offending benefactors and his fellow clerics.
