= Prince Csaba =

Youngest son of Attila in Hungarian mythology

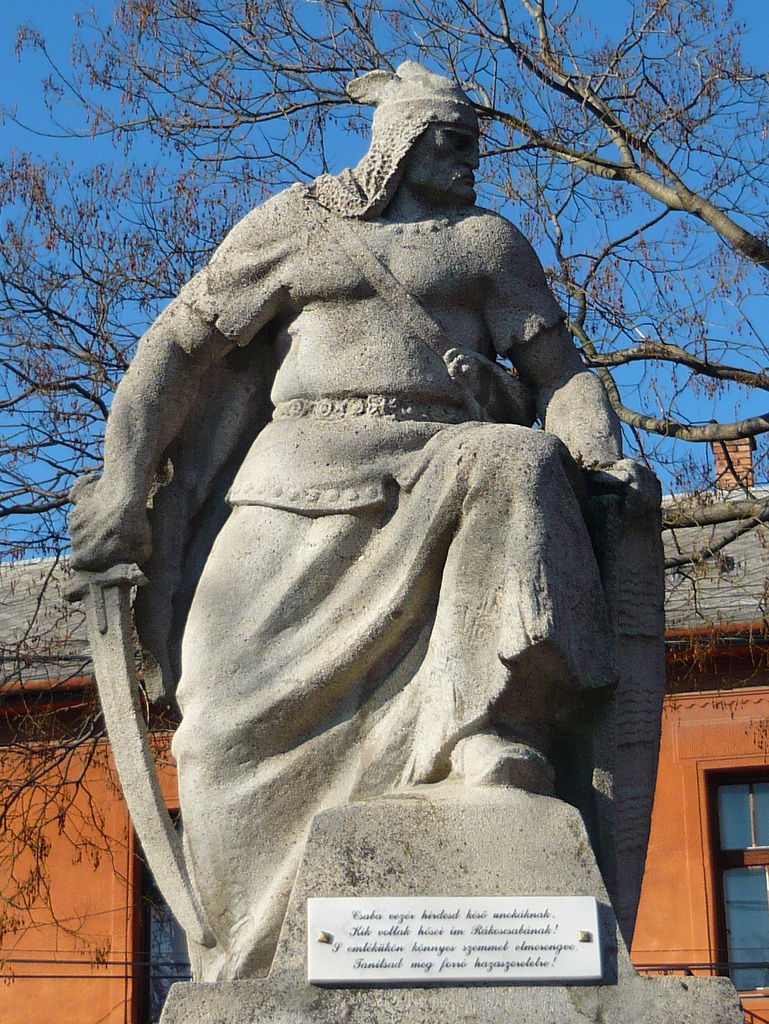
the statue of Prince Csaba in Rákoscsaba, Budapest

In Hungarian mythology, Prince Csaba was the youngest son of Attila, King of the Huns. A fierce and skilled warrior, he led the Huns to victory in all the battles they encountered over the ages. He is the legendary leader of the Székelys.

But after Csaba's death, the Huns had no one to take his place. Seizing their chance, the enemies of the Huns launched an assault on the Hun kingdom. As they met on the field of battle, the enemy generals mocked the Huns, saying "and who will save you now that Csaba is gone?" But no sooner had those words been spoken, a bright pathway consisting of stars appeared in the night sky and Csaba rode down at the head of an army from the heavens. Csaba and his army routed the Frankish invaders and saved the Huns once again, and three more times he returned down the "Skyway of the Warriors" to defend his people. According to some versions of the legend, he was seen once more several centuries later leading Árpád and the Hungarians, a brother tribe of the Huns, over the Carpathians and into the land that is today known as Hungary. The basic premise of the Hungarian medieval chronicle tradition that the Huns, i.e. the Hungarians coming out twice from Scythia, the guiding principle was the Hun-Hungarian continuity.

Consequently, the meaning of the Hungarian name Csaba (Csaba - "A gift from the sky" or "A gift from the heavens") is said to have been derived from this legend.

Simon of Kéza and Mark of Kalt claimed that he was the legendary ancestor of the Aba clan; Mark additionally claimed that he was the legendary ancestor of the Árpád dynasty. (Note: Anonymus, notary of Béla III, linked the Árpád dynasty to Attila, yet he did not specify from which of Attila's sons; he also did not link Ed(u), his brother Edumen, their Aba descendants: e.g. Pata, Samuel Aba, etc. to Attila; instead he ascribed them Cuman ancestry.)

György Györffy argued the character of Prince Csaba was compiled from real people, such as the 10th-century chieftain Csaba and the 11th-century comes Csaba (or Aba), a confidant of the first king Stephen I of Hungary. The former indeed left Hungary for the Balkans together with his tribe in the mid-10th century, while the latter was perhaps the father of Samuel Aba and thus ancestor of the prestigious Aba clan.

== Family tree ==
Árpád dynasty's coat of arms

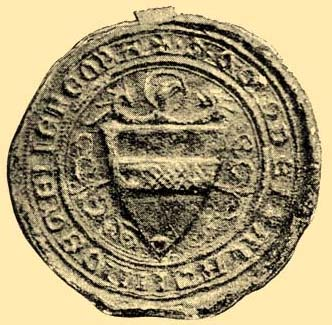
Seal of Amadeus Aba (early 14th century)

According to Simon of Kéza's Gesta Hunnorum et Hungarorum and Mark of Kalt's Chronicon Pictum:

Attila
Csaba
Árpád dynasty	Aba clan
