= Creontius =

Bavarian official and historian

Creontius or Craentius, Germanized Crantz (fl. 8th century), was a Bavarian official and historian.

He served as the referendarius of Duke Tassilo III (r. 748–788), a position variously translated as chief counsellor, secretary or chancellor. He wrote a now lost chronicle in Latin that is partially preserved by Johannes Aventinus (1477–1534), who inserted passages from it into his Annales ducum Boiariae and also translated some into German for his Bairische Chronik. These passages were "long considered spurious but [are] now accepted as authentic". Nonetheless, Aventinus occasionally amended the works he copied to give them a false precision, so his version of Creontius' text must be approached critically. It is still a valuable source because it offers a unique Bavarian perspective on the reign of Tassilo. P. D. King translated into English six excerpts attributed to Creontius, one from the Annales and five from the Chronik.

Creontius is a contemporary and independent source. He has a pro-Bavarian bias and, on account of Tassilo's marriage to Liutperga, daughter of the Lombard king Desiderius, a pro-Lombard bias as well. He was generally hostile to the Frankish king Charlemagne, who engineered Tassilo's deposition. Despite his pro-Lombard stance, he favoured Christopher and Sergius against Pope Stephen III. He was apparently an eyewitness to the downfall of Christopher and Sergius in 771. He was either residing in Rome at the time, or attached to Desiderius' entourage when the latter came to Rome. Under that same year, Creontius records Charlemagne's repudiation of his queen, Gerperga, another daughter of Desiderius. He says that she returned to Italy near death and, "although it had been bruited about that she was sterile, she bore a son in Italy and died in childbirth." This claim is not corroborated elsewhere and is considered unlikely, but it indicates Creontius' hostility to Charlemagne and partiality to Desiderius that he tried to combat the official line on Gerperga.

Creontius provides important information about Tassilo's wars with the Carantanians. He gives an account of Tassilo's meeting with Charlemagne at Worms in 781, reporting that "they concluded an eternal peace with each other". He provides a detailed account of the fighting between the Bavarians and Charlemagne's Italian lieutenant, Rotpert, near Bolzano in the valley of the Adige in 784 or 785, even connecting it with the ongoing rebellion of Widukind:

Duke Widukind from Saxony, who attacked Francia, did great damage to king Charles. For this reason, king Charles's chief man in Italy, the above-named duke Rotpert, believed there was a plot instigated by duke Tassilo in Bavaria, fell upon that land in the valley of the Adige, captured the city of Bolzano, sacked it and left it burned to the ground. The Bavarians, seeking to revenge this, came to their city of Bolzano, repossessed it and drove into Italy against duke Rotpert of Lombardy ... And duke Tassilo concluded an eternal peace with his neighbours the Huns [Avars]. And duke Rotpert again invaded Bavaria intending to capture the Bavarian city of Bolzano. Duke Tassilo sent his chief men there, Gewein and Iwein; they killed duke Rotpert and many of the enemy with him; the rest of the people all fled. And so the Bavarians won a great victory and much booty.

In his account of the extreme weather events and supernatural signs that occurred in the winter of 786—widely noted at the time—Creontius reports that Tassilo, "on the advice of the Bavarian bishops and other wise men of the land, had a general fast ordered throughout the entire land; everyone including the prince himself had to fast, to strew ashes on his bare head, to go barefoot, to do public penance in church and to make confession."

== Editions ==
- Riezler, Sigmund von, ed. (1881). "Ein verlorenes bairisches Geschichtswerk des achten Jahrhunderts". Sitzungsberichte der königlichen bayerischen Akademie der Wissenschaften, philosophisch-philologisch-historische Klasse. 1: 247–291. urn:nbn:de:bvb:824-dtl-0000069688
  - Riezler's text was included in Duchesne, Louis, ed. (1886), Liber pontificalis, vol. I, Paris, at p. 484, n. 58.
- King, P. D., ed. (1987). Charlemagne: Translated Sources. Lambrigg: P. D. King. pp. 340–343.
