= Silver Chalice =

Silver Chalice may refer to:

- The Silver Chalice (novel), a 1952 historical novel by Thomas B. Costain
- The Silver Chalice (film), a 1954 adaptation of the book, starring Paul Newman
- Silver Chalice Wicca, an American Wiccan tradition which formed the basis of Universal Eclectic Wicca
- Silver Chalice, digital and media investment subsidiary of the Chicago White Sox
