= Annales ducum Boiariae =

1519 and 1521 bavarian history by Johannes Aventinus

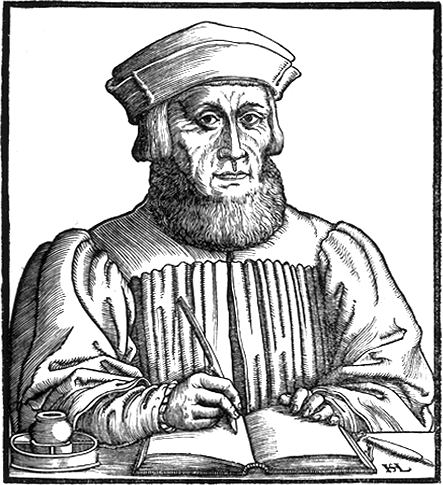
- Johannes Aventinus
- Author: Johannes Aventinus
- Language: Latin
- Genre: History
- Publisher: de:Simon Schard
- Publication date: 1554
- Media type: book

The Annales ducum Boiariae is a Latin chronicle detailing the history of Bavaria, written between 1519 and 1521 by Johannes Aventinus (1477–1534), the first official historiographer of Bavaria. Aventinus also authored numerous shorter works focusing on Bavarian monasteries and cities. His writings received widespread acclaim from humanists and scholars across Germany.

== Overview ==
Despite the praise, Aventinus faced opposition from his patrons, Duke William IV and Duke Louis X of Bavaria, due to his pro-emperor stance and criticism of the Catholic Church. Consequently, his works were not published during his lifetime, and he was briefly imprisoned. Posthumously, the Annales ducum Boiariae was published in 1554, followed by the German-language Bayerische Chronik in 1566, both becoming foundational texts in German historical literature.

In 1563, the Council of Trent included the Annales ducum Boiariae in the Index Librorum Prohibitorum due to its candid remarks about the Pope and clergy. However, Duke Albert V of Bavaria later commissioned a revised edition and recommended its acquisition by monasteries in his duchy. Despite earlier censorship, Aventinus's works continued to influence scholars and were referenced by notable figures, reflecting their enduring significance in Bavarian historiography.

== History ==
Annales ducum Boiariae is a history of Bavaria written in Latin between 1519 and 1521 by Johannes Aventinus (4 July 1477 – 9 January 1534).

He also wrote numerous less extensive works, which are primarily dedicated to Bavarian monasteries and cities. Numerous humanists were full of praise for the first official Bavarian historiographer. Also scholars from outside Bavaria found enthusiastic words of praise for his writings.

Beatus Rhenanus only expressed the opinion of the historians of his decades when he happily informed Aventin in a letter: Tuam in optimis studiis diligentiam tota Germania praedicare incipit.

The clients, the ducal brothers William IV, Duke of Bavaria and Louis X, Duke of Bavaria, condemned the strictly pro-emperor stance of their court historiographer, but above all his criticism of the Catholic Church. Because Aventine's political and religious views were in clear opposition to their politics, they refused to publish them during their lifetime. For this reason he was even imprisoned for a short time. The copies of the Bavarian Chronicles were confiscated, and the author was expressly forbidden from publishing them independently on the basis of his manuscripts.

Until the posthumous publication of Aventinus' Chronicles, there was a number of calls for it to be printed quickly, full of eager anticipation. Aventinus's main works, the Latin "Annales ducum Boiariae" and the German-language "Bayerische Chronik" became basic works of historical literature in Germany after their publication in 1554 and 1566 respectively, and have since been updated several times.

At the Council of Trent 1563, it was decided to create the Index Tridentinus, a list of forbidden books. Annals ducum Boiariae was included in the Index Tridentinus because of its frank words about the Pope and the clergy.

Since 1550 Albert V was Duke of Bavaria. The Annales ducum Boiariae were included in the Index Tridentinus of forbidden books, and the reading of the works of the auctor haereticus primae classis was forbidden to Catholic Christians. Albert V, Duke of Bavaria commissioned the printing of the "Annales ducum Boiariae" in a purged version and not only omitted Aventinus' name when publishing the Index Tridentinus in 1569, but also included his main work in a list of books recommended for the monasteries of his duchy to purchase. The Editio princeps of the "Bavarian Chronicle" was published from Aventinus's estate in 1566 in Frankfurt by the Speyer Chamber Court assessor de:Simon Schard concerned. This was the decisive step in the history of influence. Even the harsh verdict of the influential counter-reformers Petrus Canisius and Caesar Baronius and the return of Duke William V to the orthodox church policy of his grandfather could only hinder the spread, not prevent it.

From 1579 onwards, William V, Duke of Bavaria had his own Bavarian index published.

The name Aventine is also mentioned in the Bavarian index published in 1582. The Wittelsbach court library then placed the Aventine inscriptions under lock and key. The court archivist Michael Arrodenius required the express permission of the Curia to use them. However, these measures largely came to nothing.

On the other hand, even ducal officials such as Hieronymus Ziegler, de:Wolfgang Hunger or de:Wiguleus Hund as well as the respected church historian Onofrio Panvinio afford to openly and laudably refer to the indexed author in their works.
