= Liutperga =

- Duchess of Bavaria
- Reign: c. 770 – c. 788
- Born: c. 750
- Died: c. 794
- Spouse: Tassilo III, Duke of Bavaria
- Issue: Theodo; Cotani; Hrodrud; Theodebert
- Father: Desiderius, King of the Lombards
- Mother: Ansa
- Religion: Roman Catholicism

Liutperga (Liutpirc) (fl 750 - fl. 793) was a Duchess of Bavaria by marriage to Tassilo III, the last Agilolfing Duke of Bavaria. She was the daughter of Desiderius, King of the Lombards, and Ansa.

== Duchess of Bavaria ==
She was married to Tassilo at some point prior to 770, possibly in 763, to confirm the traditional alliance between Lombardy and Bavaria. The couple had two sons, Theodo and Theodebert, and two daughters, Cotani and Hrodrud.

=== Political agency ===
It has been argued that Liutperga resented the Frankish king Charlemagne. This argument is based on both the supposed repudiation of his marriage to Liutperga's sister Desiderata and his subsequent destruction of the Kingdom of Lombardy and imprisonment of her parents.

Liutperga played an apparently major role in her husband's opposition to Charlemagne. Frankish annals references to Liutperga suggest this. The Annales Mettense Priores refer to her as Tassilo's "wicked wife" and the Revised Royal Frankish Annals refer to the Liutperga's "urging" of her husband to push the Avars into conflict with Charlemagne.

Liutperga is also referenced in a Freising charter of 804. The charter notes that a 'Bishop Arbeo' had angered Tassilo and Liutperga because of his close relations with the Franks and they had therefore removed churches from his possession.

== Later life ==
When, in 788, her husband was deposed and tonsured along with her eldest son Theodo, Liutperga is unaccounted for. However, the Murbach annals state that Charlemagne sent his agents to Bavaria for the wife and children of Tassilo. It was in the 788 trial that the Royal Frankish Annals describe Liutperga’s role in inciting her husband to plot against the Frankish kingdom. That same year, her brother, Adalgis, launched a failed attempt to reclaim the Lombard kingdom via southern Italy with Byzantine assistance and afterward was never mentioned again.

In 794, when Tassilo was placed on trial before the Council of Frankfurt and his dynasty renounced, Liutperga is yet again not mentioned. It has been suggested this could be due to her death.

While in 802-3, years after she was last mentioned, it appears Charlemagne still considered Liutperga’s influence a threat as she is included in his capitularies as one of very few women mentioned.

== Tassilo Chalice ==
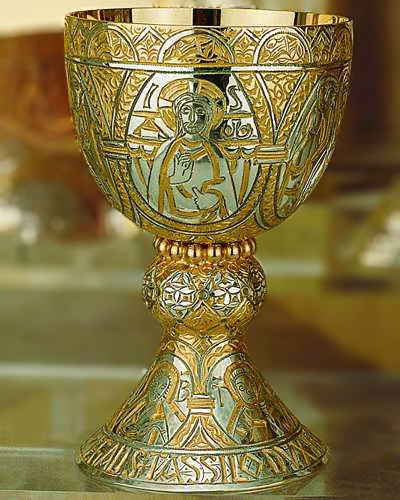
Reproduction of the 'Tassilo Chalice', c.770x788

The Tassilo chalice, a creation of someone with experience in insular craftmanship, somewhen between 770-788, was most likely a gift to the Kremsmünster monastery from Liutperga and Tassilo. The inscriptions at the bottom of the cup read '+ Tassilo Dux fortis + Liutpirc virga regalis'. 'virga regalis' translates to 'the royal rod/branch'.

Preceded by Hiltrud	Duchess of Bavaria; 770–788	Succeeded by Fastrada
