= Theodo (son of Tassilo III) =

Theodo, sometimes numbered Theodo II, was the eldest son of Duke Tassilo III of Bavaria and his co-ruler from at least 782 until 787.

Theodo was born between 767 and 771 to Tassilo and his wife, Liutperga, a daughter of King Desiderius of the Lombards. His day of birth, October 8, is known from the Walderdorffer calendar fragment, which suggests that it was celebrated annually, probably by services of thanksgiving in the church for the birth of an heir. In 772, he was sent to Rome, where he was baptized by Pope Hadrian I on Whitsunday (17 May), with King Desiderius presiding. According to the Auctarium Garstense, the pope also anointed him. The choice of his name and his place of baptism were probably connected, since Duke Theodo I was the first Bavarian duke to go to Rome.

In the foundation charter of Kremsmünster Abbey, Tassilo refers to Theodo as his "most beloved son", but later scribes emended the document to state that it was Theodo's first year as duke (co-reigning with his father). The first authentic document in which Theodo receives a title is from 782, in which he is called nobilissimus.

On 3 October 787, Tassilo handed Theodo over to Charlemagne, king of the Franks, as a hostage along with twelve others for his obedience as a vassal. On 6 July 788, Theodo was tonsured as a monk along with his father at the abbey of Sankt Goar. He was confined to Saint Maximin's Abbey, Trier.

The year of Theodo's death is unknown.
