= Forced monasticism =

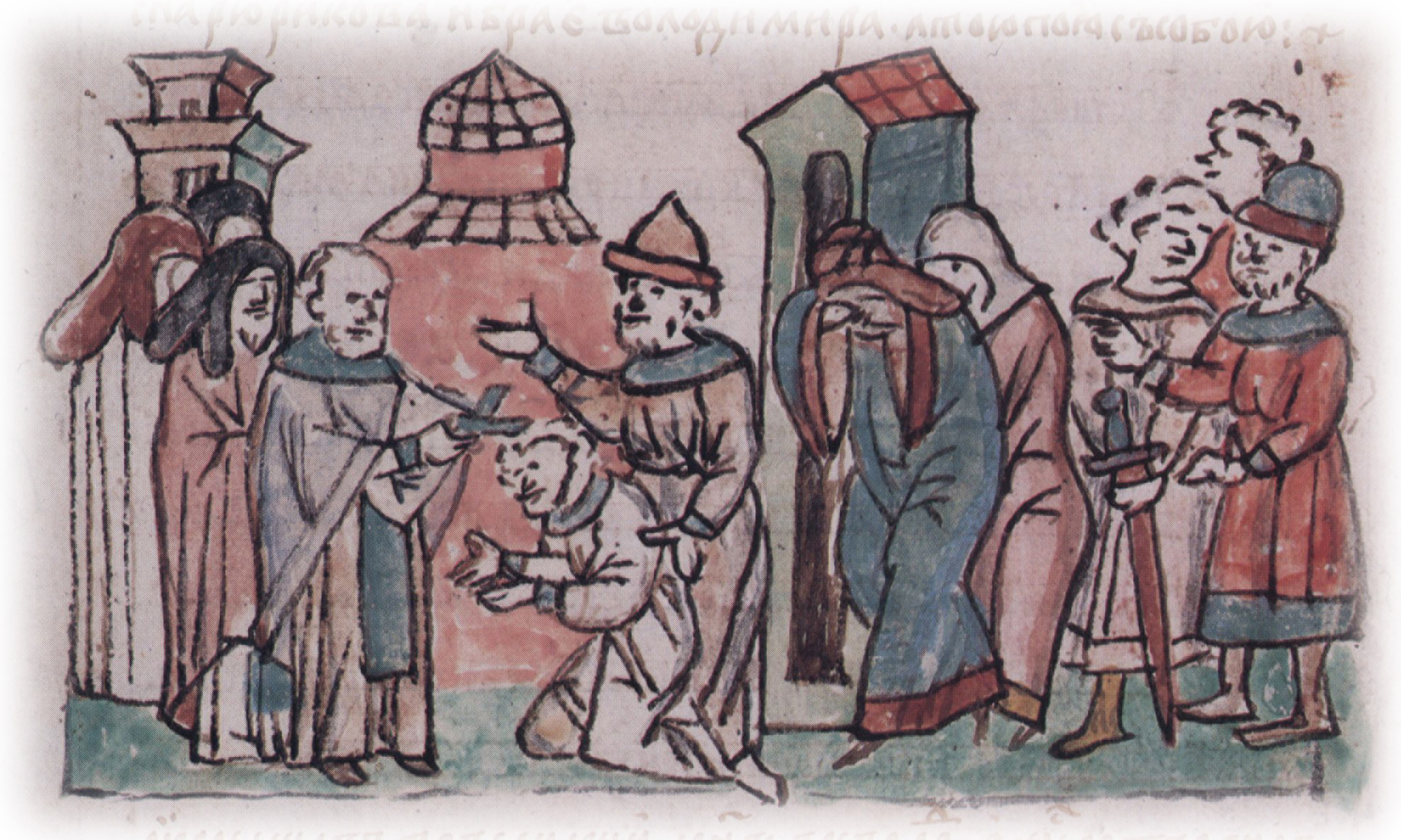
Rurik II being forcefully monasticised with his wife and daughter after dethronement

Forced monasticism is the practice of compelling a person to enter a monastic life without their consent. Historically, it was practiced within Christendom in some places during the Middle Ages as a way to neutralize political rivals. In Russian tsardom and Russian Empire it survived well into the modern era, and most Russian Orthodox Church monasteries were built as prisons, as such they were employed later by the Soviet authorities to serve the country's Gulag system.

== Background ==
Monasticism usually entails people separating themselves from the world in a spiritual sense, by forgoing marriage, property and some personal freedom, in order to more greatly pursue religious devotion and service. Monks and nuns may feel a calling that inspires them to pursue this kind of spiritual life. Usually this choice is made freely without compulsion, however, this has not always been the case in practice.

Among the Merovingians, long hair was a sign of royalty, while in contrast, clerics were tonsured and wore their hair short. In medieval Gaul, if one removed the long hair of a king, you removed his claims to kingship as well. Tonsuring was seen as a more humane method of dealing with rivals or rebels than the death penalty, the decision being left to the clemency or political judgment of the monarch.

== Political tonsuring in Medieval Christendom ==
During the time of the early Frankish kingdoms, the Merovingian dynasty employed forced monasticism against their enemies, including members of their own family.

- Chararic, a king, and his son were both forcibly tonsured by Clovis I after they failed to help Clovis in a war. Both were also forcibly ordained to holy orders. When they tried to resist this and return to secular life, Clovis had them both killed.
- Merovech, son of King Chilperic I of Neustria was forced to accept tonsure and ordination to the priesthood by his father after he tried to marry his late uncle's wife and his father suspected him of betrayal.
- King Theuderic III was tonsured but grew his hair again and regained power.
- Ebroin, Frankish mayor of the palace, was deposed by the Burgundian nobles, but his life was spared at the intervention of a number of bishops; he was tonsured and confined to Luxeuil Abbey.
- In Anglo-Saxon England, Ceolwulf of Northumbria was deposed, forcibly tonsured by his enemies and placed in a monastery, but was quickly restored.
- Theudechild, wife of king Charibert I, was forced into a nunnery after her husband's death.

After the death of Chlodomer, King of Orleans, his brothers Chlothar and Childebert coveted his kingdom and determined to kill Chlodomer's three young sons. The two eldest were murdered, but loyal members of the household were able to bring the youngest, Clodoald to safety. He came to prefer the solitude of life as a hermit rather than the hazards of life at court. When he was twenty he had his hair cut in a public ceremony by the Bishop of Paris, thus demonstrating to his uncles that he sought no part of his father's kingdom and posed no threat.

== Forced monachization ==
Forced monachization was a phenomenon of the early modern period in which elite families would consign a younger sibling to a monastery. This was generally done for economic purposes in order to keep the family estate intact for a primary heir. The individual confined could appeal to church authorities to be released from their vows. The idea of a woman being forced into monastic life has become a trope in nunsploitation films.

=== Prohibition ===
Forced monachization refers to the practice of forcing young boys and girls to enter monastic life against their will. It was addressed in the XXV Session of the Council of Trent, which took place between the 3rd and the 4th of December 1563 in Trent (Italy). Later it was further regulated by regional Church authorities, notably in Milan.

Overall, the practice was condemned and prohibited by the introduction of stringent requirements regarding the age of these girls and their examinations of vocation. Canon XV established the minimum age of 16 for young boys and girls to enter monastic life. A year was required to elapse between their education, which was often conducted in monasteries and convents, and their permanent entry into the religious community. Canon XVII imposed that the Vicar of the Nuns or another clergyman available for such task performed an examination of the young girls’ vocation. The purpose was to establish whether the decision of taking the veil was indeed coming from the girl’s intention or, rather, it was the product of duress, threat or deceit. Finally, Canon XVIII punished with excommunication (anathema) anyone, regardless of their position or status, who forced a woman, whether a maiden, widow, or otherwise, to enter a monastery, wear a religious habit, or take vows against her will. The same consequences applied to anyone who supported or enabled such actions, whether by offering advice, assistance, approval, or simply being present while knowing the decision was not freely made.

These provisions were substantiated by the legislation issued between 1627 and 1632 by the Milanese Church. This initiative followed the legacy of Carlo Borromeo, Archbishop of Milan after the Council of Trent, who was deeply committed to implementing Tridentine reforms. His successors, notably Pope Paul V, expanded Borromeo’s efforts, leading to more detailed codifications of the relevant canons. Though initially applied in the Duchy of Milan, these procedures gradually inspired adoption elsewhere in Italy. Central to this framework was a decree titled Way of Examining the Little Girls Eager for Monastic Life. It prescribed a three-stage examination process: (i) within the religious community, (ii) at entry into the monastery, and (iii) before final profession. Vicars were instructed to examine motivations, timing, and possible external pressures, such as family interests, financial needs, or lack of dowry. At each step, girls had to freely confirm or reconsider their decision, and superiors were tasked with assessing their determination and motives to make sure they were convinced to enter monastic life.

Once entered, legally escaping monastic life was cumbersome and rare, especially for women. The Council of Trent allowed for release from vows within five years, but the rule was often unknown or practically inaccessible. Alternatively, after five years, if petitioners were able to prove violations of one or more canonical requirements, they could petition the Pope for a restitutio in integrum, before the competent forum, namely the Sacra Congregatio Concili in Rome. Even when successful, the process, requiring a decree of nullitas professionis, was prohibitively complex and expensive. As a result, most women who had been forced into religious life remained bound by their vows.

== Oblates ==
Children vowed and given by their parents to the monastic life, in houses under the Rule of St. Benedict, were commonly known by the name "oblate" during the century and a half when the custom was in vogue. Often the offering was made in completion of a vow, along with a donation towards the child's support. In many cases the family may have already had a connection to the monastery chosen, with a family member serving as abbot or prioress. There the child would be educated. Not professed monks or friars, the Council of Toledo (656) forbade their acceptance before the age of ten and granted them free permission to leave the monastery, if they wished, when they reached the age of puberty. The term puer oblatus (used after that Council) labels an oblate who had not yet reached puberty and thus had a future opportunity to leave the monastery.

== Russian Orthodox Church ==
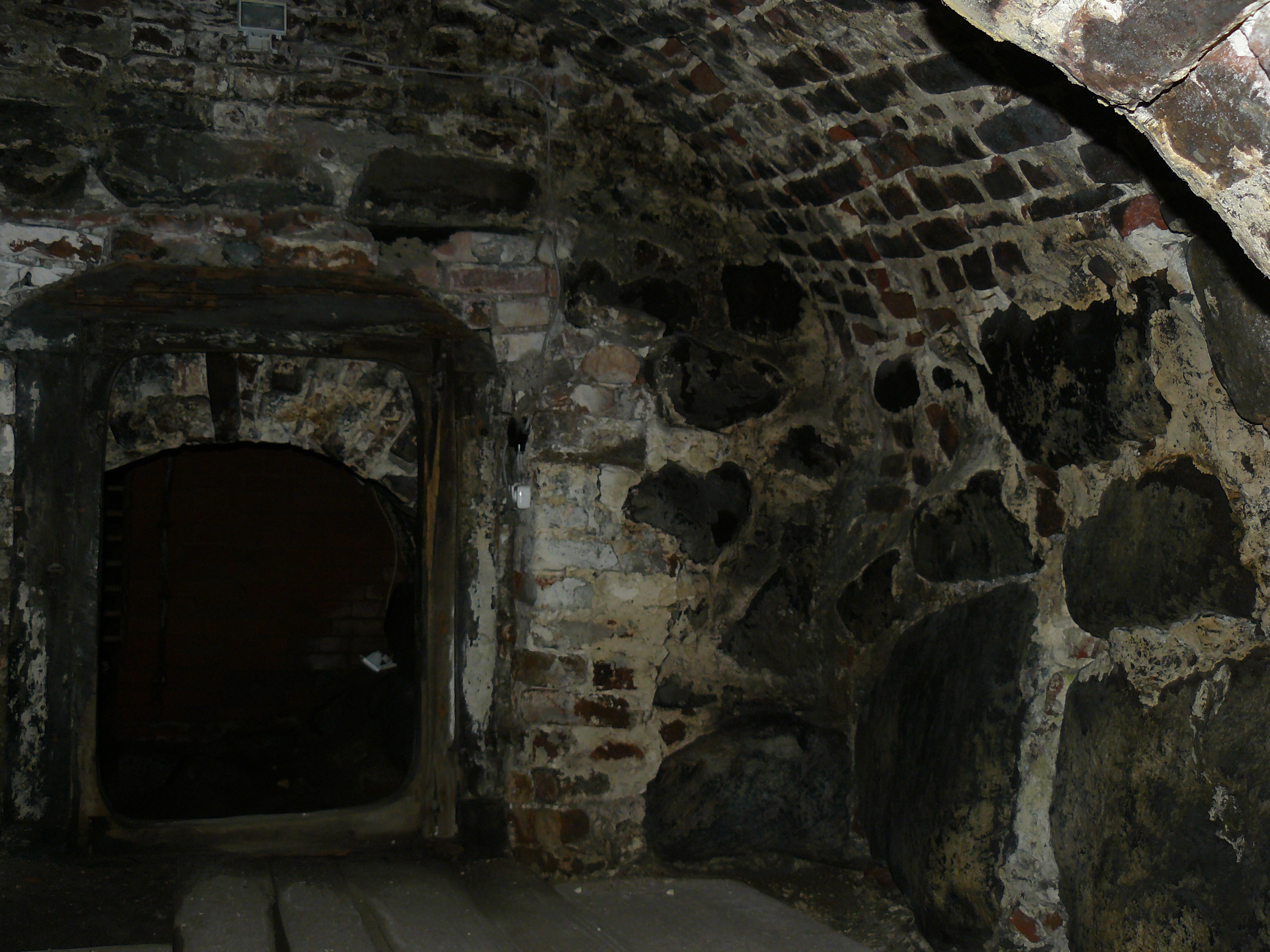
Dungeon of the Solovetsky Monastery Prison, where Petro Kalnyshevsky was incarcerated

A number of the Russian Orthodox Church monasteries were employed by the NKVD as prisons for the Soviet prison system, with minor or no refurbishments:

- Achairsky Cross Monastery
- Belopesotsky Monastery
- Golgotha-Raspyatsky Skete
- Catherine's Hermitage
- St. John the Baptist Monastery
- Kirillo-Novoezersky Resurrection Monastery
- Makariyevskaya Hermitage
- St. Michael the Archangel Monastery
- Nilov Monastery
- Novinsky Monastery
- Novospassky Monastery
- Optina Hermitage
- Pertominsky Spaso-Preobrazhensky Monastery
- St. Catherine's Monastery
- Solovetsky Monastery
- Spaso-Preobrazhensky Monastery
- Spaso-Prilutsky Monastery
- Starobelsky Monastery
- Tregulyaevsky St. John the Baptist Monastery
- Kholmogory Dormition Monastery

With Solovetsky and Optina Monastery being the most populous prisons, containing tens of thousands of inmates.
