= Johannes Aventinus =

Bavarian Renaissance humanist historian and philologist (1477-1534)

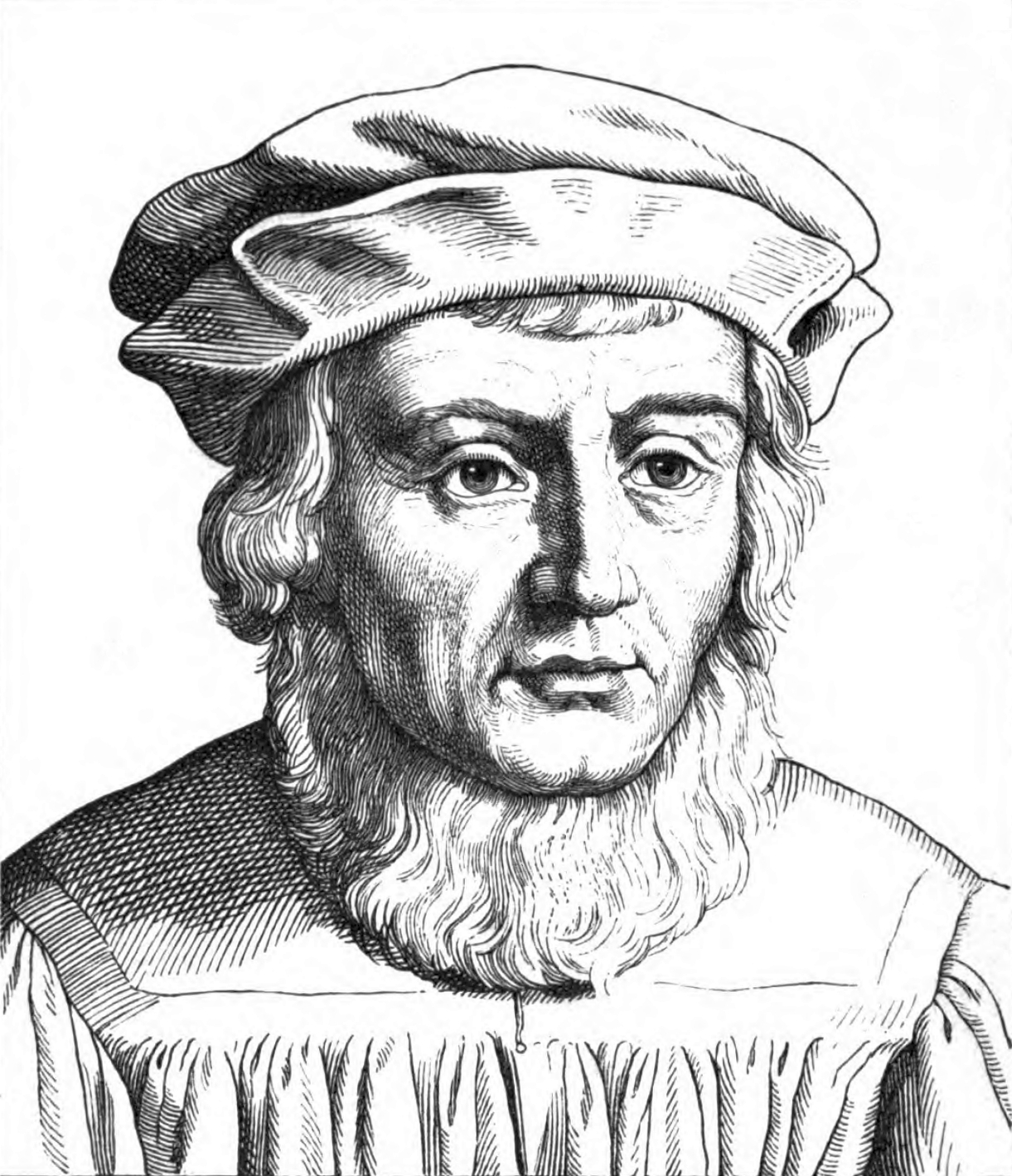
Johannes Aventinus, illustration from 19th century

Johann Georg Turmair (or Thurmayr) (4 July 1477 – 9 January 1534), known by the pen name Johannes Aventinus (Latin for "John of Abensberg") or Aventin, was a Bavarian Renaissance humanist historian and philologist. He authored the 1523 Annals of Bavaria, a valuable record of the early history of Germany.

== Tutor ==
Having studied at Ingolstadt, Vienna, Cracow and Paris, he returned to Ingolstadt in 1507 and in 1509 was appointed tutor to Louis and Ernest, the two younger brothers of William IV, Duke of Bavaria, all three the sons of Albert the Wise, the late duke of Bavaria. Aventinus retained this position until 1517, wrote a Latin grammar (Rudimenta grammaticae latinae; 1512) and other manuals for the use of his pupils, and in 1515 traveled in Italy with Ernest. In his zeal for learning, he helped found the Sodalitas litteraria Angilostadensis, the "literary brotherhood of Ingolstadt", under the auspices of which several old manuscripts were brought to light; however, it soon ceased to exist (1520).

== Historian of Bavaria ==
In 1517, William appointed him as Bavaria's official historian and commissioned him to write a history of the country. Many of the important authorities that Aventinus collected for this purpose have been preserved only in his copies. He embodied a critical treatment of them in a complete history of Bavaria, Annales Bojorum ("Annals of Bavaria"). His condensed German version, the Bayerische Chronik, is one of the first major works of history written in the German language.

== The Reformation ==
Aventinus remained a Catholic throughout his life, even though he sympathized with aspects of the Protestant reform. He was in communication with Philipp Melanchthon and Martin Luther. He rejected auricular confession, objected to pilgrimages and indulgences, and opposed the claims of the hierarchy as excessive. He showed a strong dislike for monks. On this account, he was imprisoned in 1528, but his friends soon effected his release. The remainder of his life was somewhat unsettled, and he died at Regensburg.

== Annals of Bavaria ==
The Annals, which are in seven volumes, deal with the history of Bavaria in conjunction with general history from the earliest times to 1460, and the author shows sympathy for the Empire in its struggle with the Papacy. He took pains with his work, and to some degree anticipated the modern historiography. Another result of his nonconformity was that the Annals were not published until 1554. Many passages were omitted in this Ingolstadt edition, as they reflected on the Roman Catholics.

A more complete edition was published at Basel in 1580 by Nicholas Cisner. Aventinus, who has been called the "Bavarian Herodotus," wrote other books of lesser importance, and a complete edition of his works was published at Munich (1881–1886).

In his Annals, Aventinus preserved some of the text of the now lost 8th-century chronicle of Creontius.

=== Teutonic genealogy ===
In his Chronik, Aventinus fabricated a succession of Teutonic kings stretching back to the Great Flood, ruling over vast swathes of Germany and surrounding regions until the 1st century BC, and involving themselves in numerous events from Biblical and Classical history.

These rulers and their exploits are mostly fictitious, though some are derived from mythological, legendary or historical figures. Examples of the latter are Boiger, Kels II and Teutenbuecher, whose joint reign is given as 127–100 BC, and who are based on King Boiorix of the Cimbri, the unnamed king of the Ambrones, and King Teutobod of the Teutons.

Dynasty of Tuitsch
Dynasty of Mader
Dynasty of Brenner III
Unknown dynastic affiliation

| Ruler | Ruler | Ruler |
|---|---|---|
| Tuitsch 2214–2038 | Adalger 1377–1328 | Mader 644–589 |
| Mannus 1978–1906 | Larein 1328–1277 | Brenner II & Koenman 589–479 |
| Eingeb 1906–1870 | Ylsing 1277–1224 | Landein, Antör & Rögör 479–399 |
| Ausstaeb 1870–1820 | Brenner I 1224–1186 | Brenner III 399–361 |
| Herman 1820–1757 | Heccar 1186–1155 | Schirm & Brenner IV 361–263 |
| Mers 1757–1711 | Frank 1155–1114 | Thessel, Lauther & Euring 279–194 |
| Gampar 1711–1667 | Wolfheim Siclinger 1114–1056 | Dieth I & Diethmer 194–172 |
| Schwab 1667–1621 | Kels I, Gal & Hillyr 1056–1006 | Baermund & Synpol 172–127 |
| Wandler 1621–1580 | Alber (& six unnamed others) 1006–946 | Boiger, Kels II & Teutenbuecher 127–100 |
| Deuto 1580–1553 | Walther, Panno & Schard 946–884 | Scheirer 100–70 |
| Alman 1553–1489 | Main, Öngel & Treibl 884–814 | Ernst & Vocho 70–50 |
| Baier 1489–1429 | Myela, Laber & Penno 814–714 | Pernpeist 50–40 |
| Ingram 1429–1377 | Venno & Helto 714–644 | Cotz, Dieth II & Creitschir c. 40–13 |

== Legacy ==
Ludwig I of Bavaria had Aventinus' bust erected in the Walhalla temple. There is a German wheat beer named after him, made by G. Schneider & Son.
