= 768 =

Calendar year

768 in various calendars
Gregorian calendar	768; DCCLXVIII
Ab urbe condita	1521
Armenian calendar	217; ԹՎ ՄԺԷ
Assyrian calendar	5518
Balinese saka calendar	689–690
Bengali calendar	174–175
Berber calendar	1718
Buddhist calendar	1312
Burmese calendar	130
Byzantine calendar	6276–6277
Chinese calendar	丁未年 (Fire Goat); 3465 or 3258 — to — 戊申年 (Earth Monkey); 3466 or 3259
Coptic calendar	484–485
Discordian calendar	1934
Ethiopian calendar	760–761
Hebrew calendar	4528–4529
- Hindu calendars
Vikram Samvat	824–825
Shaka Samvat	689–690
Kali Yuga	3868–3869
Holocene calendar	10768
Iranian calendar	146–147
Islamic calendar	150–151
Japanese calendar	Jingo-keiun 2 (神護景雲２年)
Javanese calendar	662–663
Julian calendar	768; DCCLXVIII
Korean calendar	3101
Minguo calendar	1144 before ROC 民前1144年
Nanakshahi calendar	−700
Seleucid era	1079/1080 AG
Thai solar calendar	1310–1311
Tibetan calendar	阴火羊年 (female Fire-Goat); 894 or 513 or −259 — to — 阳土猴年 (male Earth-Monkey); 895 or 514 or −258

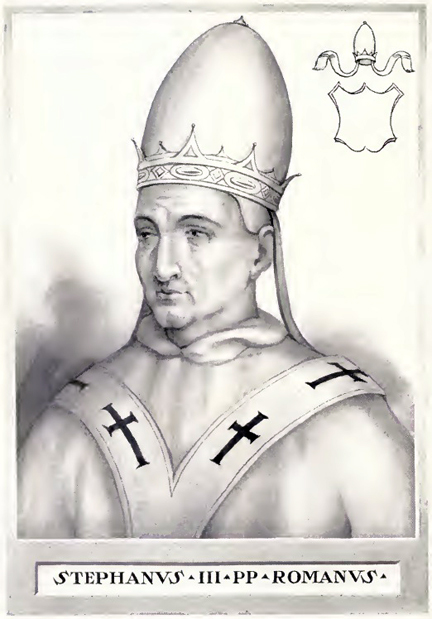
Pope Stephen III (768–772)

Year 768 (DCCLXVIII) was a leap year starting on Friday of the Julian calendar. The denomination 768 for this year has been used since the early medieval period, when the Anno Domini calendar era became the prevalent method in Europe for naming years.

== Events ==
=== By place ===
==== Frankish Kingdom ====
- September 24 – King Pepin III (the Short) dies at Saint-Denis, Neustria. The Frankish Kingdom is divided between his two sons: Charlemagne and Carloman I. According to Salic law Charlemagne receives the outer parts of the kingdom bordering on the sea, namely Neustria, western Aquitaine, and the northern parts of Austrasia; while Carloman is awarded his uncle's former share, the inner parts: southern Austrasia, Septimania, eastern Aquitaine, Burgundy, Provence, Swabia, and the lands bordering Italy.
- Waiofar, duke of Aquitaine, and his family are captured and executed by the Franks in the forest of Périgord. Waiofar's kinsman Hunald II succeeds to his claims and continues to fight against Charlemagne.

==== Iberian Peninsula ====
- Fruela I (the Cruel), the King of Asturias, is assassinated in Cangas, his capital, after he murders his brother Vimerano. Fruela is succeeded by his cousin Aurelius, who is chosen by the nobility.
- In al-Andalus, the Berber tribal chieftain Saqiya ibn Abd al Wahid al-Miknasi leads a rebellion against the Emirate of Córdoba, in the present-day Spanish province of Extremadura.

==== Britain ====
- King Alhred of Northumbria marries Princess Osgifu, possibly daughter of the late king Oswulf (approximate date).

==== Asia ====
- The Kasuga Shrine is erected at Nara (Japan), by the Fujiwara family. The interior is famous for its many bronze lanterns, as well as the stone lanterns that lead up to the Shinto shrine

=== By topic ===
==== Religion ====
- August 7 – Pope Stephen III succeeds Paul I as the 94th pope of the Catholic Church. The antipope Constantine II is overthrown at Rome, through intervention by King Desiderius of the Lombards, after a brief reign (see 767).
- Lebuinus, Anglo-Saxon missionary, founds the city of Deventer (modern-day Netherlands), and builds a wooden church on the bank of the River IJssel (approximate date).
- Archbishop Elfodd of Gwynedd persuades the Welsh Church to accept the Roman dating of Easter, as agreed by the British Church at the Synod of Whitby (see 664).

== Births ==
- Han Yu, Chinese philosopher and poet (d. 824)
- Konstanti Kakhi, Georgian nobleman (d. 853)
- Song Ruoxin, Chinese scholar, poet and lady-in-waiting (d. 820)
- Xue Tao, Chinese poet (d. 831)

== Deaths ==
- August 20 – Eadberht, king of Northumbria
- September 24 – Pepin the Short, king of the Franks (b. 714)
- Dub-Indrecht mac Cathail, king of Connacht (Ireland)
- Fruela I, king of Asturias
- Li Huaixian, general of the Tang Dynasty
- Pagan, ruler (khagan) of the Bulgarian Empire
- Toto, duke of Nepi
- Waiofar, duke of Aquitaine
- Winibald, Anglo-Saxon abbot
- Yaxun B'alam IV, ruler (ajaw) of Yaxchilan (b. 709)
