= George (bishop of Ostia and Amiens) =

George was a Franco-papal diplomat who served as the bishop of Ostia (753–798) in the Papal State and bishop of Amiens (767–798) in Francia. He moved extensively between Italy and Francia, but his best recorded mission is the one he made to England in 786.

== Bishop of Ostia before 767 ==
The start of the translation of the Chronographia with an attribution to George above the text: Cronica Georgii Ambianensis episcopi ('Chronicle of Bishop George of Amiens')

George was a native of Italy. He may have been a Greek from southern Italy and thus a native speaker of Greek. He was apparently the owner of a now lost manuscript of the Greek Chronographia Scaligeriana, which he gave, loaned or sold to the abbey of Corbie around 780, where it was rather clumsily translated into Latin.

George is recorded as the bishop of Ostia from 753. The earliest reference to the bishop of Ostia and the other suburbicarian bishops as "cardinal bishops" dates from George's time. In 754, George accompanied Pope Stephen II to the court of the court of the Frankish king Pippin III for the anointing of Pippin and his sons, Charlemagne and Carloman. The Liber pontificalis lists him first among the pope's followers on this occasion, before Wilchar and the archdeacon Theophylact. In early 756, during the Lombard siege of Rome, Stephen sent George back to Pippin with letters requesting Frankish intervention.

George was also sent on further diplomatic missions to Francia by Pope Paul I between 757 and 759. In 757, he attended the Council of Compiègne. In 761, Paul gave him permission to reside permanently in Francia. George's prolonged absences from Italy have been linked to the gradual abandonment of the Constantinian Basilica, the ancient cathedral of Ostia, which declined in the late 8th century only to be completed despoiled for the building projects of Pope Gregory IV (r. 827–842).

In 767, the pope-elect Constantine II recalled George to Rome, probably to perform the bishop of Ostia's traditional role in the confirmation of a new pope. Because of the disputed legality of Constantine's election, George refused to return. To regularize the situation, Pippin III arranged for him to become bishop of Amiens, while continuing to hold the see of Ostia.

== Bishop of Ostia and Amiens ==
The red rubric at the bottom of the page is the dating formula at the start of the legates' report to Hadrian, from a copy made c. 1000. George's name can be seen at the start of the last line.

After his appointment to Amiens, George spent more time in Francia than in Italy. In the division of Francia that followed the death of Pippin III in 768, Amiens fell within the kingdom of Charlemagne. George was one of twelve bishops from Francia sent to attend the Lateran synod of 769, which confirmed the deposition of Constantine II. In the spring of 773, Charlemagne sent George, Abbot Wulfhard of Tours and a certain Alboin to Pope Hadrian I in Rome to ascertain the state of affairs in Italy. The envoy's report confirmed that the Lombards were delinquent in their treaty obligations, paving the way for Charlemagne's invasion of Italy. A letter from Hadrian to Charlemagne dated about 782 confirms that George was a subject of both the pope and the king with dual loyalty for his two bishoprics.

In 786, George led a papal legation to England. Setting out from Italy, he was accompanied by Bishop Theophylact of Todi as co-legate and Abbot Wigbod of Trier as Charlemagne's representative. Several sources, including the Anglo-Saxon Chronicle, treat this mission as the first of its kind since Augustine of Canterbury's two centuries earlier. One of the purposes of the mission was to coordinate the celebration of litanies in England and France for Charlemagne's victory in the Saxon Wars and the baptism of the Saxon leader Widukind. According to the Northern Annals, "George held primacy among" the legates "and they were honourably received by kings and bishops, and by princes and nobles of this country." The legates' report, in the form of a letter to Hadrian, survives, albeit incomplete.

According to their report, the legates landed in Kent and "rested" at Canterbury as guests of Archbishop Jænberht before travelling to the court of King Offa of Mercia. A legatine council was held in Mercia attended by Offa, his bishops and King Cynewulf of Wessex. After this, the legates split up, with George going to Northumbria and Theophylact visiting Wales. In Northumbria, George held a council attended by King Ælfwald I and Archbishop Eanbald I of York. The report to Pope Hadrian is most detailed concerning the Northumbrian council. It was attended by Alcuin and Pyttel, who accompanied George and Wigbod back to Mercia as the legates of Ælfwald and Eanbald. After George's return to Mercia, a new council was convoked by Offa at which the decisions of the Northumbrian council were read out and accepted.

George returned to the continent in late 786. His report was available in Rome by January 787. He brought Alcuin back with him to the Frankish court. In 790, when Alcuin was back in Northumbria, he wrote to Abbot Adalard of Corbie asking him "to send greetings to my [spiritual] father George."

George's last recorded act was to consecrate the churches of the Abbey of Saint-Riquier in 798.

== Bibliography ==
- Bachrach, Bernard (2013). Charlemagne's Early Campaigns (768–777): A Diplomatic and Military Analysis. Brill.
- Burgess, Richard W. (2013). "The Date, Purpose, and Historical Context of the Original Greek and the Latin Translation of the so-called Excerpta Latina Barbari". Traditio. 68: 1–56. doi:10.1017/S0362152900001616.
- Davis, Raymond, ed. (1992). The Lives of the Eighth-Century Popes (Liber Pontificalis): The Ancient Biographies of Nine Popes from AD 715 to AD 817. Liverpool University Press.
- Levison, Wilhelm (1946). England and the Continent in the Eighth Century. Clarendon Press. ISBN 978-0-585-27808-7.
- McKitterick, Rosamond (2008). Charlemagne: The Formation of a European Identity. Cambridge University Press.
- McKitterick, Rosamond; Espelo, Dorine van; Pollard, Richard Matthew; Price, Richard, eds. (2021). Codex Epistolaris Carolinus: Letters from the Popes to the Frankish Rulers, 739–791. Liverpool University Press.
- Nelson, Janet L. (2019). King and Emperor: A New Life of Charlemagne. Penguin.
- Story, Joanna (2003). Carolingian Connections: Anglo-Saxon England and Carolingian Francia, c. 750–870. Ashgate.
- Wallace-Hadrill, J. M. (1983). The Frankish Church. Clarendon Press. ISBN 978-0-19-826906-9.
- Whitelock, Dorothy, ed. (2007) [1955]. English Historical Documents, c.500–1042 (2nd ed.). Routledge.
