= Lateran Council (769) =

Synod held in Rome

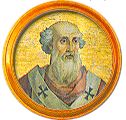
Pope Stephen III, who convoked the Lateran Council of 769 (fictional portrait at Saint Paul Outside the Walls, c. 1850)

The Lateran Council of 769 was a synod held in the Basilica of St. John Lateran to rectify perceived abuses in the papal electoral process which had led to the elevation of the antipopes Constantine II and Philip. It also condemned the rulings of the Council of Hieria. It is perhaps the most important Roman council held during the 8th century.

== Background ==
The death of Pope Paul I, on 28 June 767, led to the uncanonical election of two antipopes. Constantine II was a layman who was elevated to the Papal See by his brother Toto of Nepi and a group of Tuscan nobles. He was opposed by another antipope, Philip, who was installed by an envoy of the King of the Lombards, Desiderius, and reigned just for one day, 31 July 768. With the election of Pope Stephen III on 1 August 768, and the forcible removal of the antipopes, Stephen III had sent a request to Pepin the Short, asking for bishops well versed in the Scriptures and in canon law to assist at a synod which would seek to prevent any repeat of the events that led to the elevation of the antipopes. By the time the envoys reached Francia, Pepin was dead. They appealed to his sons Charlemagne and Carloman, who agreed to send 12 bishops to Rome. Rome was at the time part of the Byzantine Empire.

== Meetings of the Council ==
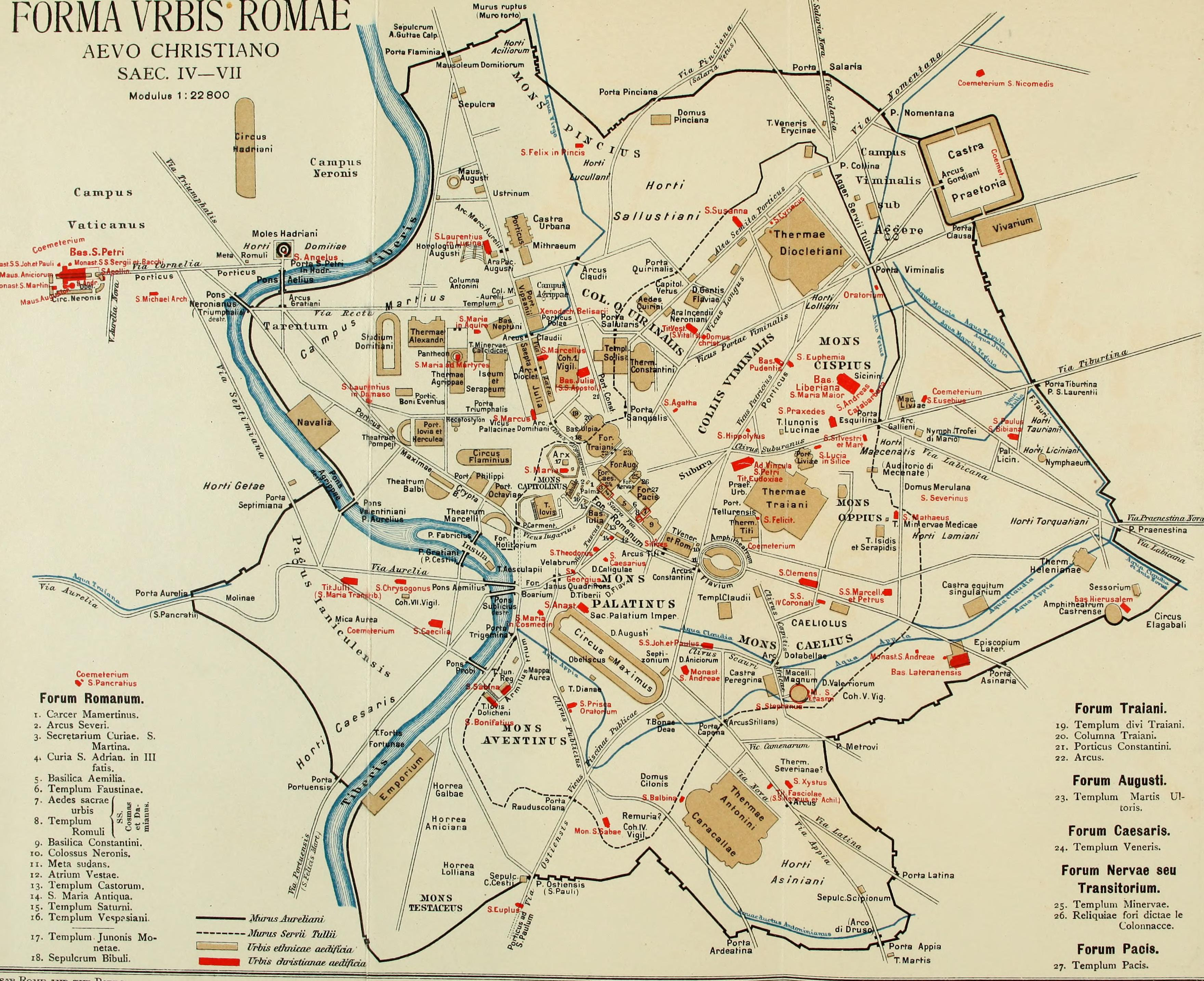
Map of medieval Rome: Lateran Basilica circled

On 12 April 769 the Pope opened the synod in the Lateran Basilica. Present were around 52 bishops (or representatives of bishops), including ones from Tuscany and Campania, as well as a large number of priests, deacons, and the laity. The Council met during four sessions, spread over four days, lasting until 15 April. The first sessions of the Council, lasting two days, were dedicated to reviewing the activities of the antipope Constantine II, in which Wilichar of Sens took a leading role.

Constantine was brought before the synod, and was asked how he justified his own accession as a layman to the Apostolic See. Constantine replied that he had been forced to take on the role, as the Roman people had been looking for someone to fix the problems left behind by Pope Paul I. He then confessed to the charges, and threw himself on the mercy of the synod. On the following day however, he retracted his confession, arguing that his actions had not been any different from other papal elections in the past. He pointed to two episcopal elections, those of Sergius, Archbishop of Ravenna, and Stephanus, Bishop of Naples, where the successful candidates had been laymen. Infuriated by his arguments, the Synod ordered Constantine to be beaten and excommunicated from the Church. Constantine's acts and rulings were then publicly burnt before the entire synod, as Pope Stephen III, the bishops, alongside the Roman laity present, all prostrated themselves, singing the Kyrie eleison, and declaring that they had sinned in receiving Holy Communion from the hands of Constantine.

The Third Session (14 April) revolved around revising the rules by which papal elections were held. After a review and discussion on the canons of the Church, as well as recent elections, the Council decreed that no layperson could be made Pope, and that only cardinal deacons or priests, who had been consecrated and had moved through the minor orders, could be elected pope. The Council then mandated that from the time of the Council onward, the laity could not participate in the election of a pope. Prohibitions were placed upon the presence of armed men, or of soldiers from Tuscany and the Campania, during the papal election. Once, however, the election had been held by the clergy, and a pope selected, the Roman army and people were to greet and acknowledge the pope-elect before he was escorted to the Lateran Palace.

The third session on that same day saw the issuing of decrees with regards to the ordinations undertaken by the antipope Constantine. The synod decided that the bishops, priests, and deacons whom Constantine had ordained were to once again return to their previous station that they held prior to Constantine's appointment. However, the synod also stated that if those who had been consecrated bishops by Constantine were re-elected via a canonical method, they might be reconciled and restored to the episcopate by the Pope. The Pope could also reinstate priests and deacons; however, any layperson who had been ordained a priest or deacon by Constantine was consigned to spend the rest of his life in a monastery, and none could ever be promoted to a higher religious office.

The final session of the Council, held on 15 April, was dedicated to providing a ruling concerning the ongoing Iconoclast controversy. Reviewing the writings of the Church Fathers, the Council decreed that it was permissible and desirable for Christians to venerate icons. It confirmed the rulings of the Council of Rome in 731 concerning the valid use of images. The synod then condemned the Council of Hieria and anathematized its iconoclastic rulings. Finally, it collected additional texts in support of the veneration of icons, including portions of a letter from the three eastern patriarchs to Pope Paul I.

Once the meetings had been concluded, a procession of clergy and people walked barefoot to St. Peter's Basilica. There, the Council's decrees were announced, anathemas were invoked, condemning any who violated the decrees, and both were written up for exposition to the people.

== Immediate outcome and long-term effects ==
The bishops who had been consecrated by Constantine seem to have been on the whole reconciled by the Pope. Pope Stephen III, however, never returned priests or deacons to the rank to which the antipope Constantine had raised them. In general, the sacraments administered by Constantine, apart from Baptism and Confirmation, were repeated under Stephen. The iconoclast portion of the Council was meant to clearly align Rome with Francia, and to signal to the Franks that the Byzantines were heretics. Significantly, the Roman dating of the Council was no longer by the years of the Byzantine Emperors, and thus apparently indicating that the Council was not recognising imperial sovereignty whilst the Church was in schism.

The rulings of this Council concerning the election of the popes were gradually eroded over the course of the decades and centuries. As early as 827, the election of Pope Valentine saw the election of a pope where the nobility and people actively took part in the election. This continued development, and the ignoring of the Council's rulings, saw the Papacy reach its nadir during the 10th century, when the papacy became the plaything of the Roman aristocracy.

== Participants ==
Pope Stephen III was the principal prelate at the Council. After him was placed the representative of the Archbishop of Ravenna, indicating his status as the first Metropolitan bishop of the west.

=== Frankish bishops ===
- Wilichar of Sens
- Wulfram of Meaux
- Lullus of Mainz
- Gaugenus of Tours
- Ado of Lyons
- Herminarius of Bourges
- Daniel of Narbonne
- Erembert of Worms
- Verabulp of Bordeaux
- Herulfus of Langres
- Tilpin of Reims
- Giselbert of Noyon

=== Italian bishops ===
- George of Ostia
- Joseph of Dertona
- Lanfried of Castrum
- Aurinand of Tuscania
- Peter of Populonium
- Felerad of Luna
- Theodore of Pavia
- Peter of Caere
- Maurinus of Polimartium
- Leo of Castellum
- Sergius of Ferentino
- Jordanes of Segni
- Ado of Orte
- Ansualdus of Narni
- Nigrotius of Anagni
- Agatho of Sutri
- Theodosius of Tibur
- Pinius of Tres Tabernae
- Boniface of Piperno
- Valeran of Trevi
- Bonus of Manturanum
- Gregory of Silva Candida
- Eustratius of Albano
- Pothus of Nepi
- Cidonatus of Portus
- Antoninus of Caesena
- John of Faenza
- Stabilinus of Pesaro
- Maurus of Fano
- Juvian of Gallese
- George of Sinigaglia
- Sergius of Ficoclae
- Tiberius of Rimini
- Florence of Eugubium
- Temaurinus of Urbino
- Cidonatus of Velletri
- The (unknown) Bishop of Bagnoregio
- The (unknown) Bishop of Centumcellae
- The (unknown) Bishop of Alatri

== General and cited references ==
- Cenni, Gaetano (1735). Concilium Lateranense Stephani III. an. 769 (in Latin). Rome: Typographie Vaticana.
- Duchesne, Louis, ed. (1886). "XCVI: Stephan's III". Le Liber pontificalis (in French and Latin). Vol. Tome premier. Paris: Ernest Thorin. pp. 468–485.
- Hefele, Charles Joseph (1896). A History of the Councils of the Church from the Original Documents, Vol. V. Translated by Clark, William R.
- Jaffé, Philipp, ed. (1885). Regesta pontificum romanorum: ab condita ecclesia ad annum post Christum natum MCXCVIII (in Latin). Vol. Tomus primus (editio altera ed. G. Wattenbach ed.). Leipzig: Veit. pp. 283–288.
- Kuttner, Stephan (1945). "Cardinalis: The History of a Canonical Concept". Traditio. 3: 129–214. doi:10.1017/S0362152900016883. JSTOR 27830076.
- Landon, Edward Henry (1909). A manual of councils of the Holy Catholic Church, Volume 2. p. 98.
- Mann, Horace K. (1903). The Lives of the Popes in the Early Middle Ages, Vol. I: The Popes Under the Lombard Rule, Part 2, 657–795.
- McKitterick, Rosamond (2008). Charlemagne: The Formation of a European Identity. Cambridge University Press.
- Noble, Thomas F. X. (2009). Images, Iconoclasm, and the Carolingians. University of Pennsylvania Press.
