= Aldebert =

8th-century Christian preacher

Aldebert (sometimes spelled Adelbert) was a Christian preacher in 8th-century Gaul. He claimed that an angel had conferred miraculous powers on him at birth, and that another had brought him relics of great sanctity from all parts of the earth. He claimed to be able to see the future and read people's thoughts, telling those who came to him that they had no need to confess, since he knew what they had done, and that their sins were forgiven.

== Life ==
Aldebert appeared in the district of Soissons in the 8th century and practised and preached a life of Apostolic poverty. He was banned by his bishop from preaching in churches, and worked in the countryside, in the open air and later in churches that his followers (he had acquired many of them) built for him.

According to St Boniface, he erected crucifixes at fields and springs and claimed to have received a letter that Jesus Christ had given from heaven to Jerusalem, which Aldebert used in his own preachings.

He used mystic prayers of his own composition to call on angels who were not accepted by church canon (Uriel, Raguel, Tubuel, Adinus, Tubuas, Sabaoc and Simiel), and who his detractors alleged were demons (some of these names had gnostic connections). One of his prayers invoked the angel Raguel. His "miracles" gained him the awe of the people, and he began to give away parings from his nails and locks of his hair as amulets. He managed to get 'unlearned' (indoctri) bishops to consecrate him a bishop. He erected crosses and built small chapels in the countryside and at springs and ordered public prayers to be offered there.

St. Boniface wrote to Rome asking for the Pope to help him "lead back the Franks and Gauls to the right path", claiming that Aldebert had seduced the multitudes. St Boniface appealed to the Pope for a synod, which held in 744 in Soissons, with the help of Carloman. The synod, led by Boniface, decided to take Aldebert into custody. The Synod ordered Aldebert's crosses burned. Aldebert escaped and continued to preach. A German synod the following year, presided over by Boniface and Carloman, excommunicated him along with an Irish preacher named Clement and many others.

They continued to preach. Pope Zachary held another council in Rome in 745 to deal with him. Boniface's account and biography was personally approved by Aldebert (neither Boniface nor Aldebert was present). Although the decisions of the northern councils that condemned him were upheld by the Roman council, they did not accede to Boniface's wish to have him excommunicated. The Council thought him to be a lunatic (as opposed to a charlatan) and decided he should be given a chance to repent, rather than excommunicated (the Irish preacher's excommunication was upheld). The Synod ordered his writings (his approved biography, his prayer, and his supposed letter from Jesus) burned.

He was still active in 746; King Pepin sent an embassy to Rome to report that the heretics were still at large and still preaching. Pope Zachary sent a letter to Boniface in 747, calling for a new council that both Boniface and Aldebert should attend, and that if the council found Aldebert to be a heretic, that Aldebert should then be sent to him so that he could personally judge the case.

A century later, the Anonymous of Mainz wrote that Aldebert had been condemned and deposed at a Synod at Mainz (which may have been the council that Pope Zachary had called for), and that afterwards he was imprisoned for blasphemy in the monastery of Fulda. The same account noted that he later escaped and was killed by thieves, although he may have died in jail. He wrote an account of his own life, but only a fragment survives. St Boniface also wrote about him, and left the largest extant record.
