= Abel of Reims =

Bishop of Reims

Saint Abel of Reims
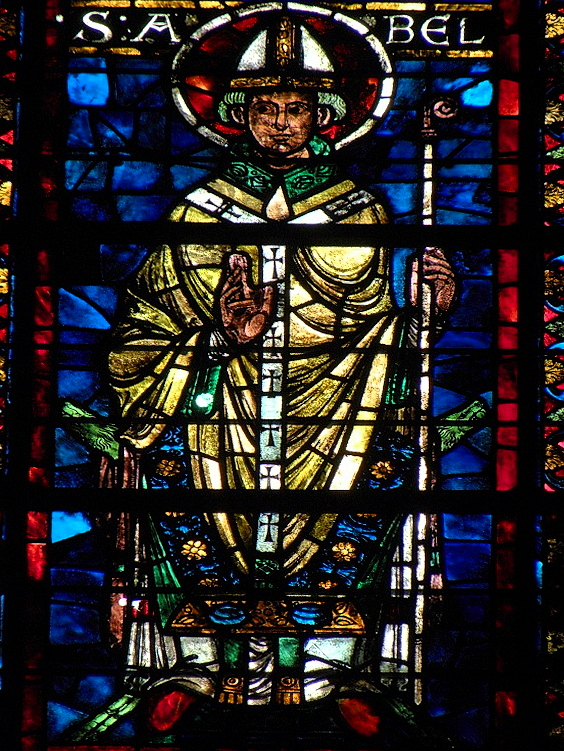
- See: Reims

Personal details
- Born: Possibly Ireland
- Died: c.751 Lobbes Abbey

Sainthood
- Feast day: 5 August (Bollandists)
- Venerated in: Catholic Church

Abel (fl. 744–747) served as the Bishop of Reims in Francia, now modern-day France. He has sometimes been venerated as a saint in the Catholic Church, particularly by the Bollandists.

== Origins ==
In the late 10th century, Folcuin wrote that Abel had been a monk in Lobbes Abbey (modern day Belgium) while Bishop Ermino (d. 737) served as abbot, and had been born in Ireland. In contrast Boniface, in a letter to a priest in the English kingdom of Mercia, insisted that Abel had in fact been born and raised in England. The modern historian Wilhelm Levison has suggested there were two individuals with the same name, but Eugen Ewig accepts the identification by Boniface as more accurate. If Folcuin's later testimony has any basis in reality, it may be that Abel, like his near contemporary Ecgberht (d. 729), had once visited Ireland and formed a close association.

== Bishop of Reims ==
In March 744, Boniface presided over the Council of Soissons and the conciliar acts record that Abel was elected archbishop (but of an unspecified see). In June, Pope Zacharias confirmed this decision by sending Abel the pallium which conferred episcopal authority. Abel is next named in the sources as one of Boniface's 'fellow bishops' who around 746 sent a letter of exhortation to Æthelbald, king of Mercia as part of his wider missionary efforts. It seems that Milo (bishop of Trier) in effect controlled a number of episcopal sees (despite only being a laymen), while Abel remained in office only as suffragan bishop. In 751, Boniface once more addressed a letter to Pope Zacharias, in which he lamented the injustices of lay control over the church, but his erstwhile ambitions to change this were not realised in his lifetime. It is unknown when Abel gave up his position or died. The 9th-century Life of Saint Remigius, written by Hincmar, Archbishop of Rheims, claims that Milo had driven Abel out from the see in favour of Tilpin. The date given is 748, but it also may be the case that Tilpin only succeeded in 762 or 763 when Able died. It's suggested that Abel may have retired in his later years to Lobbes Abbey to become abbot.

== Commemoration ==
Abel has been recognized at various times as a pre-congregation saint in the Catholic Church. In the early modern period, Abel's name was inserted in a number of martyrologies, under a variety of dates - despite the fact he was not martyred. Examples are the 17th-century martyrology of Gabriel Bucelin, the Martyrologium Gallicanum (1637) of André du Saussay, and John Mabillon. The Bollandists include a Life of Abel under 5 August, compiled by John Pinius.

Catholic Church titles
Preceded by Milo	Bishop of Reims fl. 744–748; Served alongside: Milo	Succeeded by Tilpin?
