= Papal selection before 1059 =

Selection of early Catholic leaders

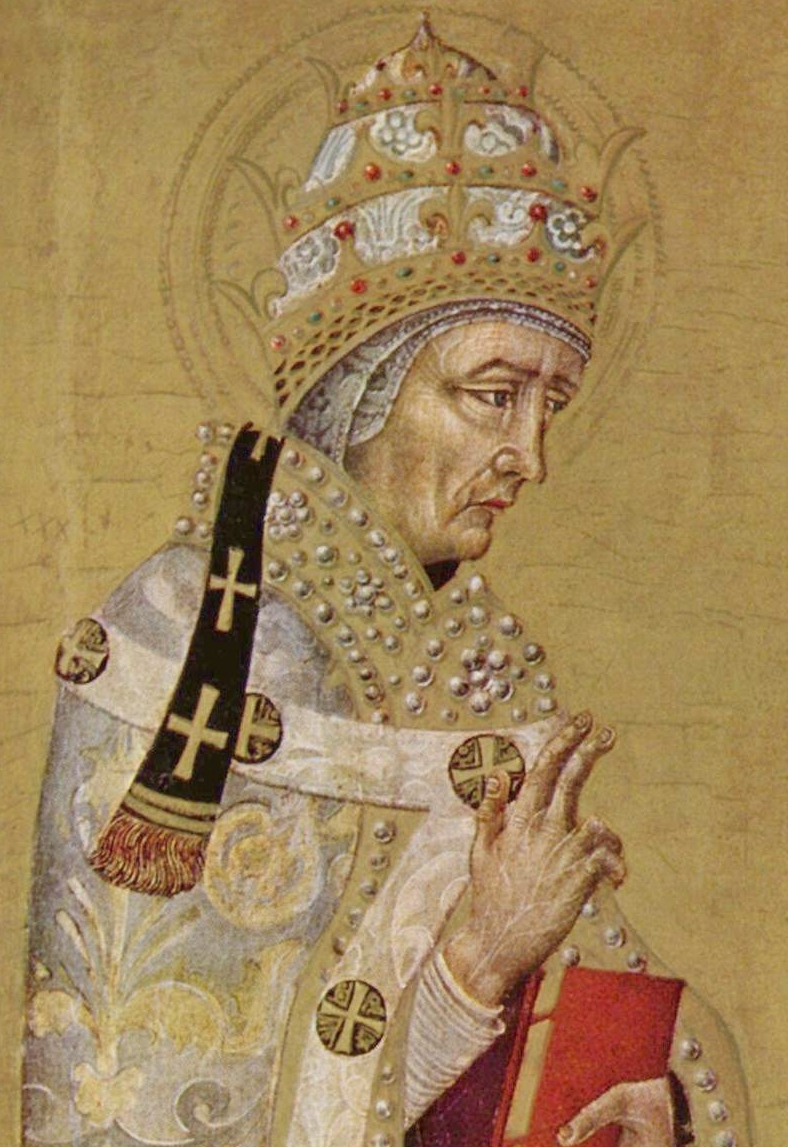
Fabian was reputedly selected as bishop because a dove landed on him, the first historical reference to a method of papal succession.

The selection of the pope, the bishop of Rome and supreme pontiff of the Catholic Church, prior to the promulgation of In nomine Domini in 1059 varied throughout history. Popes were often putatively appointed by their predecessors or by political rulers. While some kind of election often characterized the procedure, an election that included meaningful participation of the laity was rare, especially as the popes' claims to temporal power solidified into the Papal States. The practice of papal appointment during this period would later result in the putative jus exclusivae, i.e., the claimed but invalid right to veto the selection that Catholic monarchs exercised into the twentieth century.

The absence of an institutionalized procedure of papal succession facilitated religious schism, and the Catholic Church currently regards several papal claimants before 1059 as antipopes. Further, the frequent de facto requirement of political approval of elected popes significantly lengthened periods of sede vacante, i.e., transitional vacancy of the papacy, and weakened it. In 1059, Pope Nicholas II succeeded in limiting future papal electors to the College of Cardinals in In nomine Domini, instituting standardized papal elections that eventually developed into the procedure of the papal conclave.

== During the Roman Empire ==
=== From Peter to Anterus (64/67–236) ===
There is no scholarly consensus on when and on what terms Saint Peter the Apostle arrived in Rome, but most agree that he died there in AD 64 or 67. Moreover, Peter was never contemporaneously titled "pope" or even "bishop" (ἐπίσκοπος, episkopos, "overseer"). Unlike the selection procedure for a deacon, which is outlined in Acts 6:1–6, there is no scriptural method for the selection of a bishop other than by simple apostolic appointment except the selection process for those who occupy the same office of leadership as the apostles reported as suggested by Peter himself (Acts 1:20-26); the earliest text that describes the election of a bishop is the Teaching of the Twelve Apostles of circa AD 100.

According to historian Frederic J. Baumgartner, at least in part, although the election of bishops in other early Christian communities is often described in contemporary sources, the earliest Roman sources date from AD 400 and Irenaeus of Lyon (date from AD 180), claiming that Saint Peter the Apostle himself appointed Popes Linus, Cletus/Anacletus, and Clement, in that order, as his successors. Scholars consider the early official enumerations of bishops of Rome problematic because of their alleged partiality toward enhancing papal authority and anachronistically imposing continuity; for example, the earliest, the Liber Pontificalis, probably dated AD 354, is considered not credible for the first two centuries AD.

=== Recorded public elections (236–492) ===
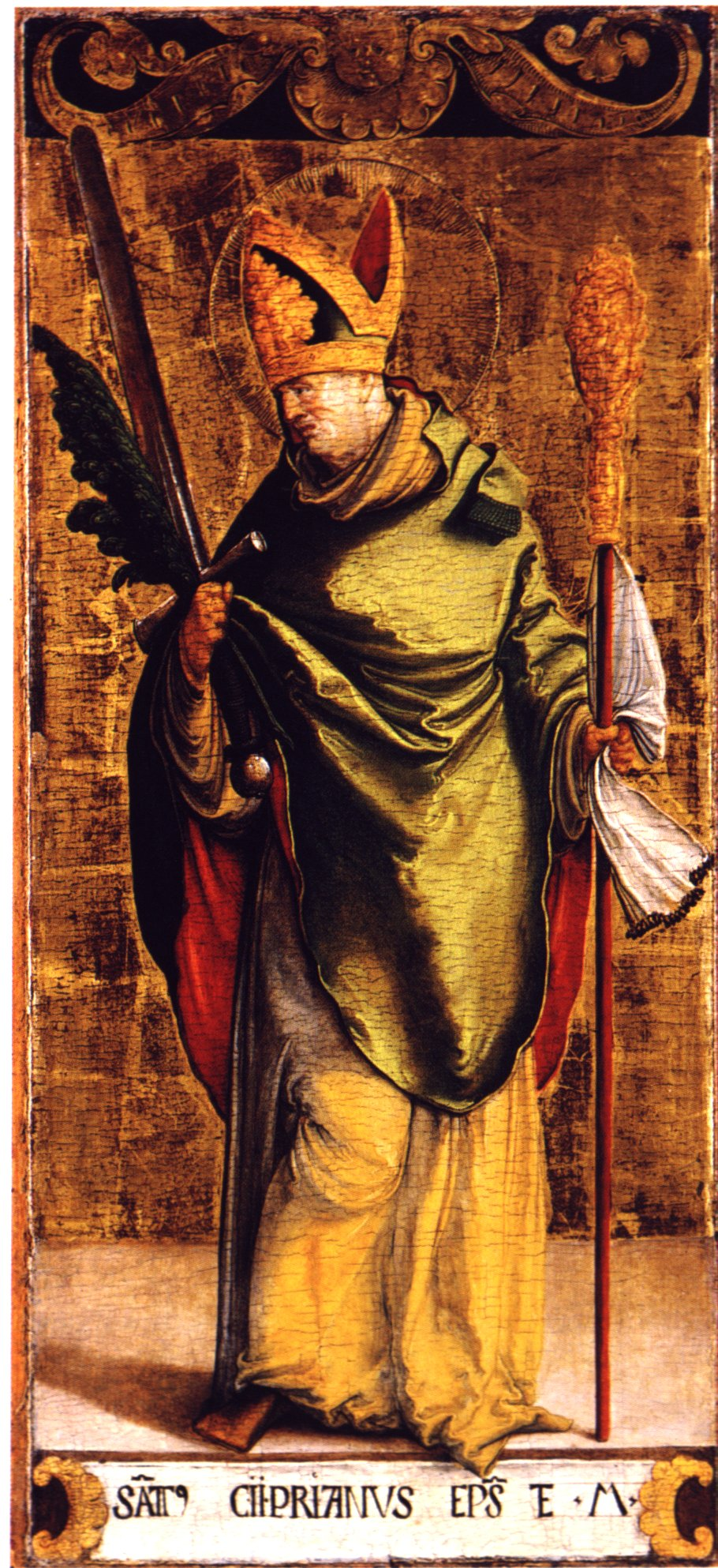
Cyprian of Carthage provides the earliest written evidence of papal election.

Eusebius relates a legend of the election of Fabian, the successor of Anterus, in 236: a dove landed on Fabian's head and "thereupon the people, all as if impelled by one divine spirit, with one united and eager voice cried out that he was worthy, and immediately they set him on the episcopal seat". This anecdote makes clear that "the choice of bishop was the public concern for the entire Christian community of Rome". Fabian can reliably be regarded as a victim of the persecution of Emperor Decius, after which there was no election for fourteen months.

The next available evidence comes from the schism between Novatian and Cornelius, both elected bishop by their own factions, and both writing to Cyprian, Bishop of Carthage for support. Cyprian sided with Cornelius, writing that:

Moreover, Cornelius was made bishop by the choice of God and of His Christ, by the favorable witness of almost all of the clergy, by the votes of the laity then present, and by the assembly of bishops.

Cyprian also remarks that Cornelius had been ordained by sixteen bishops from the surrounding region, while Novatian had only been ordained by three, the first definite evidence of a true schism in the Roman church.

Pope Mark was the first to designate the Bishop of Ostia as the first among the consecrators of the new bishop of Rome (the Bishop of Ostia is currently the Dean of the College of Cardinals). However, the influence of Emperor Constantine I, a contemporary of Sylvester I and Mark, would help solidify a strong role for the Roman emperor in the selection process: Constantine chose Julius I for all intents and purposes, and his son Constantius II exiled Liberius and installed Felix II (an Arian) as his successor. Felix and Liberius were succeeded in schism by Ursinus and Damasus, respectively, the latter of whom managed to prevail by sheer bloodshed, and he is the first bishop of Rome who can non-anachronistically be referred to as a "pope" (παππάς, or pappas). Damasus persuaded the Emperor to decree him "bishop of bishops", a claim that severely antagonized Eastern bishops, leading to the First Council of Constantinople in 381, which dealt in part with the issue of supremacy.

Even with this new title, however, the method of selection of the bishop of Rome remained much the same. Both the clergy and the laity continued to participate in the selection, along with local and imperial politics. Other trends can be observed, as well, such as father-to-son succession between Pope Anastasius I and Pope Innocent I. Emperor Honorius stepped in to resolve the schism between Eulalius and Pope Boniface I (both elected), siding with Eulalius first and then Boniface I. Honorius decreed that any future schisms should be decided by unanimous selection; although this decree has never been employed in resolving a disputed papal election, it indicates the increasing degree of imperial interest in the question of papal succession.

=== Odoacer ===
Elections of the same manner continued largely undisputed until Pope Simplicius, who was terminally ill for enough of his pontificate to devote time to matters of succession, who decreed that the minister of Germanic general Odoacer, a Roman nobleman, would have the power of approval over his successor (there was no longer a western Roman emperor, Romulus Augustulus having been deposed in 476): the result was Pope Felix III, the first pope to come from a senatorial family.

== Ostrogothic rule (493–537) ==
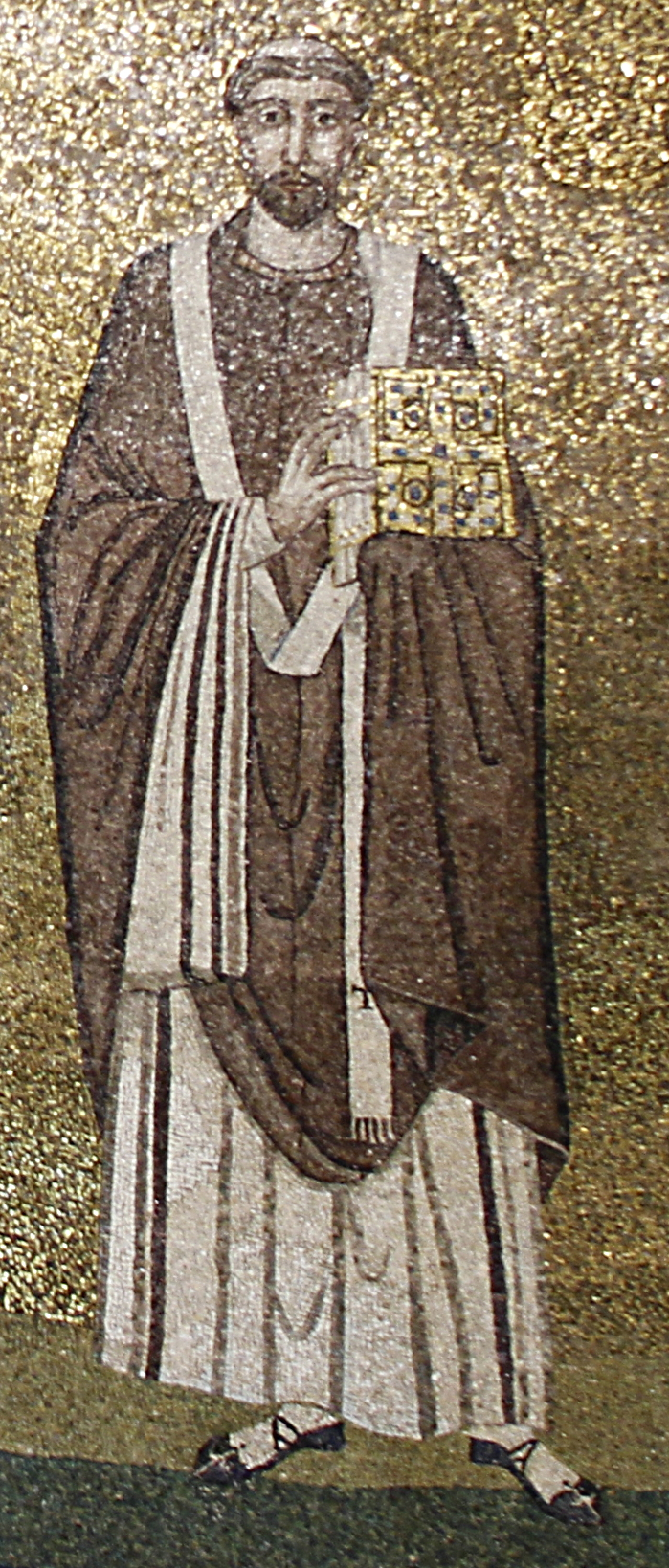
Pope Symmachus's triumph over Laurentius is the first recorded case of papal simony.

The next electoral schism of note developed between Symmachus and Laurentius, who both appealed to Theodoric the Great, the Ostrogoth king of Italy (and an Arian); the result is the first documented case of papal simony, wherein both candidates attempted to bribe the royal councilors, if not Theodoric himself, to influence his choice; Theodoric sided with Symmachus who proceeded to decree that reigning bishops would be able to designate their own successors, ending the participation of the laity for at least half a century.

This process was used without serious issue until the death of Pope Felix IV, who had given his pallium to Pope Boniface II on his deathbed in 530 and decreed excommunication of any who refused to accept the succession. The Roman Senate disliked the absence of election and denounced Felix, affirming a decree of Pope Anastasius II, which had prohibited the practice of a pope designating a successor. Boniface II was supported only by a minority of the clergy, with the larger share supporting Antipope Dioscorus, with only Dioscorus' death halting the schism.

Boniface II attempted to re-entrench the practice of appointing his successor, but the public resistance was too great, resulting in a very disputed election in 532 characterized by widespread accounts of bribery and coercion, which resulted in Pope John II (the first to take a papal name). Athalaric, the Ostrogoth king, forced John II to approve decrees that banned any private agreements to elect a pope and enacting limits on the amount of money that could be spent during a papal election (an early example of campaign finance reform). In fact, Athalaric himself was able to engineer the election of Pope Silverius, the son of Pope Hormisdas, upon the death of John II.

== Byzantine influence (537–752) ==
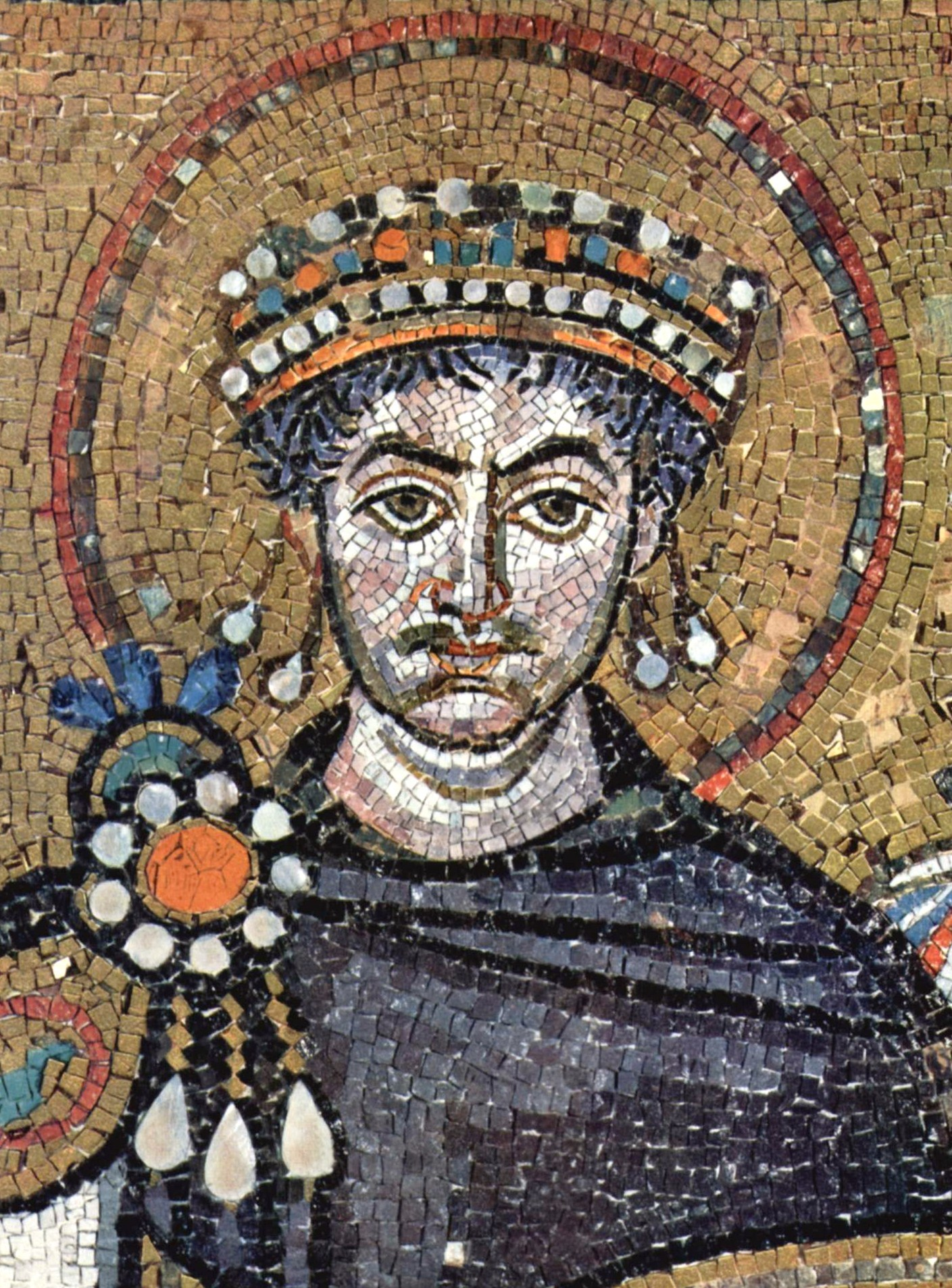
Justinian I appointed three popes following his invasion of Italy.

Upon his invasion of Italy, Justinian I forced Silverius to abdicate and in his place installed Pope Vigilius, a former papal legate to Constantinople. Justinian next appointed Pope Pelagius I, holding only a "sham election" to replace Vigilius. Afterwards, Justinian was content with the power of approval of the pope, as with Pope John III after his election. Justinian's successors continued this practice for over a century.

The continuing power of appointment of the Byzantine Emperor can be seen in the legend of Pope Gregory I writing to Constantinople to ask them to refuse his election. Pope Boniface III issued a decree denouncing bribery in papal elections and forbidding discussion of candidates for three days after the funeral of the deceased pope; thereafter, Boniface III decreed that the clergy and the "sons of the Church", i.e. nobles, should meet to elect a successor, each voting according to their conscience. This abated factionalism for the next four successions, each resulting in rapid elections and Imperial approval. However, Pope Severinus was forced to wait 20 months for Imperial approval in 640, receiving it only months before his death. So Pope Martin I refused to wait, insisting on being consecrated only days after his election. This resulted in his abduction by Emperor Constans II to Constantinople in 653, where he was tried and sentenced to exile. The successive seven popes were more agreeable to Constantinople, and approved without delay, but Pope Benedict II had to wait one year in 684. After that, the Emperor delegated the approval to the Exarch of Ravenna, the Byzantine governor of central Italy, including the Duchy of Rome.

During the pontificate of Pope Benedict II (684–85), Emperor Constantine IV waived the requirement of imperial approval for papal consecration, recognizing the great shift in the demographics of the City and its clergy. Benedict II's successor Pope John V was elected "by the general population", returning to the "ancient practice". The ten Greek successors of Agatho were likely the intended result of Constantine IV's concession. The elections of this period are known to have been conducted in the Basilica of St. John Lateran, with the possessor of the Lateran likely to prevail in the event of schism, but the exact participants in the elections are not known with certainty. Lay participation probably still occurred, but the Basilica itself was too small for the phrase "with the whole people" to continue to be literal.

The Roman army, being controlled by local aristocrats, entered papal politics in 686 by seizing the Basilica upon the death of Pope John V and evicting the clergy, violently forcing the consecration of Pope Conon and Pope Sergius I. The army also controlled the successive two elections, but with less overt violence. Pope Zachary in 741 was the last pope to announce his election to a Byzantine ruler or seek his approval.

== Frankish influence (756–857) ==
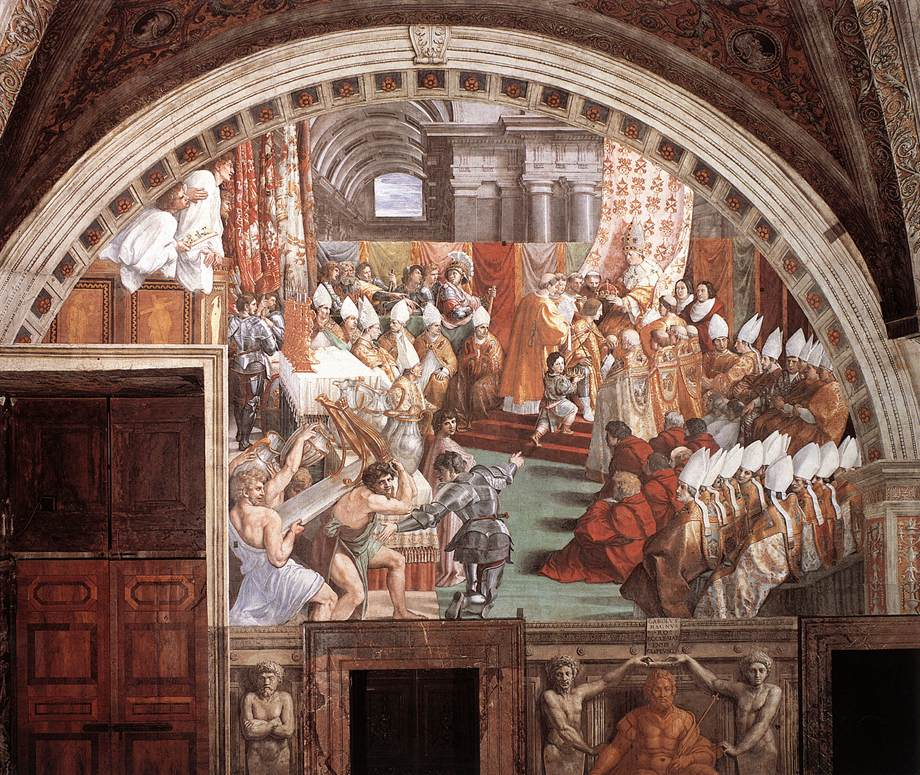
Raphael's The Coronation of Charlemagne, depicting Pope Leo III

Pope Stephen II crossed the Alps to appeal for the aid of Pepin the Short upon his election in 752, following the Lombard conquest of Ravenna, resulting in the Donation of Pepin which strengthened the claim of the Popes to the de facto Papal States, and thus the incentives for secular interference in Papal selection. After the death of Stephen II's brother and successor Pope Paul I, a Roman aristocratic faction led by Toto, dux of Nepi, entered Rome and elected Toto's brother Constantine, then allegedly a layman, as pope. Another Roman noble faction headed by the primicerius Christopher and his son Sergius contested the election, and with the aid of the Lombard king Desiderius they had Constantine imprisoned and Stephen III elected in his place. Constantine and his main supporters subsequently had their eyes gouged out. Stephen III then proceeded to convene a synod of 39 Frankish and Italian bishops, which decided that 'no layman should ever presume to be promoted to the sacred honour of the ponticate, nor even anyone in orders, unless he had risen through the separate grades and had been made cardinal deacon or priest' (that is, within Rome).

Pope Adrian I and Pope Leo III were elected under the rules of Stephen III, but the latter was forced from Rome and sought the aid of Charlemagne. After two unanimous elections, Charlemagne's son Louis the Pious intervened in a bitterly disputed election in favor of Pope Eugene II. Thereafter the process was returned by apostolic constitution to the status quo circa 769, reincorporating the lay Roman nobles, who continued to dominate the procedure for 200 years, and requiring the Pope to swear loyalty to the Frankish monarch. The consecration of Pope Gregory IV was delayed for 6 months to attain the assent of Louis.

When the clergy and the nobles elected different candidates in 844, Emperor Lothair I sided with Pope Sergius II, the noble candidate; three years later Pope Leo IV was consecrated without Imperial approval, which would have been difficult in any case as the Carolingian Empire was in the process of division. Lothair II of Lotharingia indeed failed to impose his own candidate, Pope Benedict III, in 855 until the Roman-elected candidate refused the office (the first recorded historical refusal). Lothair II was present for the election of Pope Nicholas I, who prohibited anyone outside of the Roman community from interfering in Papal elections, and as a result Pope Adrian II was consecrated without even informing the Franks.

== Pornocracy (904–963) ==
The assassination of Pope John VIII inaugurated a period marked by brief pontificates, in which as many as twelve popes were killed, sometimes after resignation, three more deposed, and two abdicated—a period known to historians as the "pornocracy" (Greek for "rule of the harlots") or "saeculum obscurum" (Latin for "dark age"). Following the alliance of Pope Sergius III with Theophylact I, Count of Tusculum (the father of Marozia, Sergius III's son's mother) and his wife Theodora, Theophylact succeeded in creating four of the successive five popes. The son of Sergius III and Marozia acceded to the Papacy as Pope John XI, only to be deposed by King Alberic II of Spoleto, who was able to control the installation of the successive four popes, eventually installing his own son Pope John XII, whose main act was to crown Otto I as Holy Roman Emperor.

A synod in 963 deposed John XII and elected Pope Leo VIII (963–965), but the Romans would not accept him once his protector, Otto I, departed, prompting the election of Pope Benedict V (964). Otto I would further succeed in appointing Pope John XIII (965–972) and Pope Benedict VI (973-974).

== Crescentii era (974–1012) ==
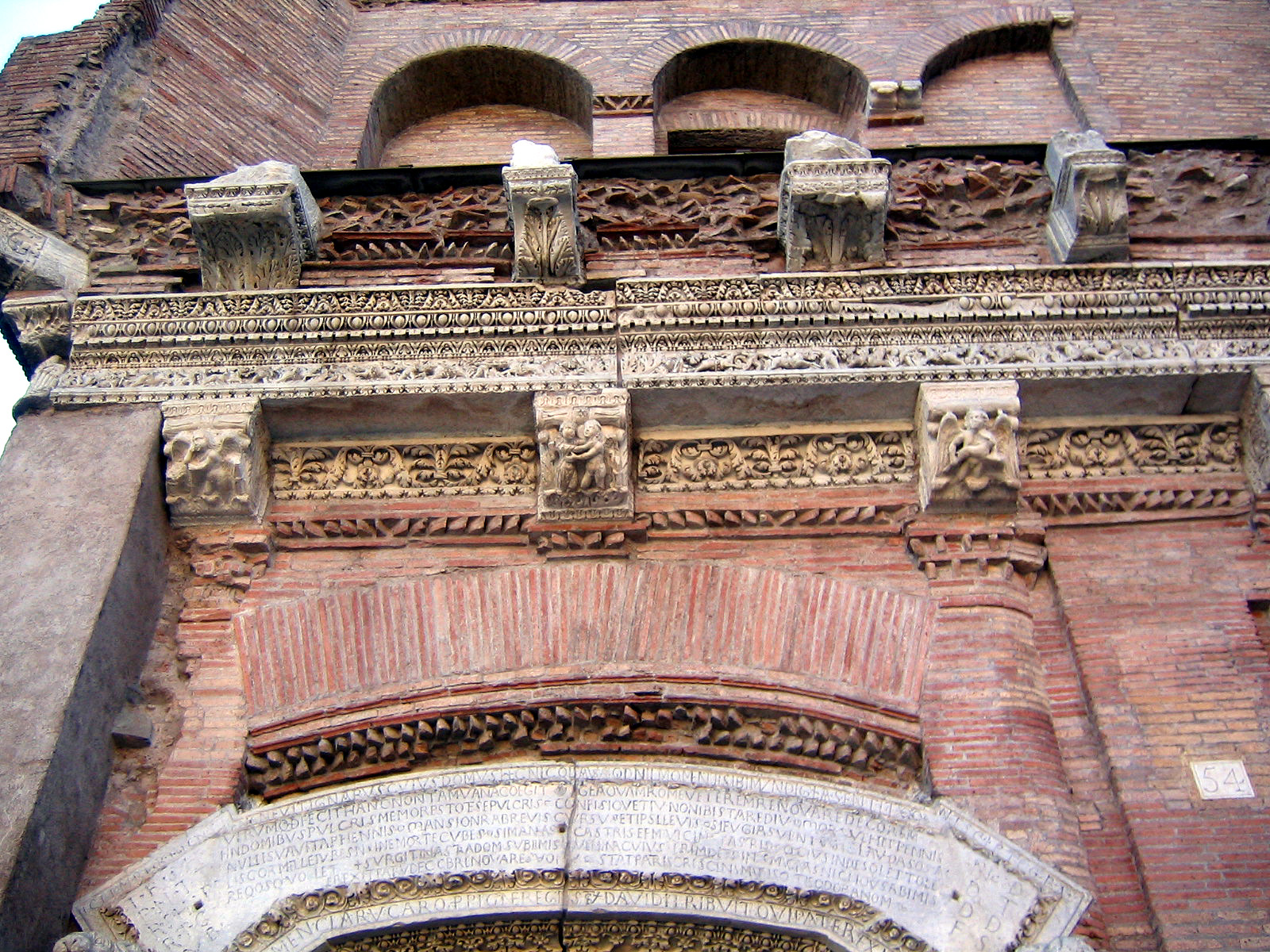
The house of Crescentius the Elder

Otto I's successor, Otto II, was impelled to conquer Rome in 980 to depose Antipope Boniface VII and install his preferred candidate Pope John XIV (983–84), without even feigning an election.

Pope John XV, the candidate of the Roman nobles upon the death of Otto II, did not survive long enough to be deposed by Otto III, who engineered the election of Pope Gregory V upon reaching Rome in 996. However, Gregory V could not remain on the throne once Otto III headed back for Germany, and the Romans replaced him with Antipope John XVI temporarily until Otto III could return. Otto III reinstalled Gregory V and secured the election of Pope Sylvester II (999–1003) upon his death, only to die himself shortly thereafter, allowing the Roman nobles to choose three popes of their own.

== Tusculan Papacy (1012–1048) ==
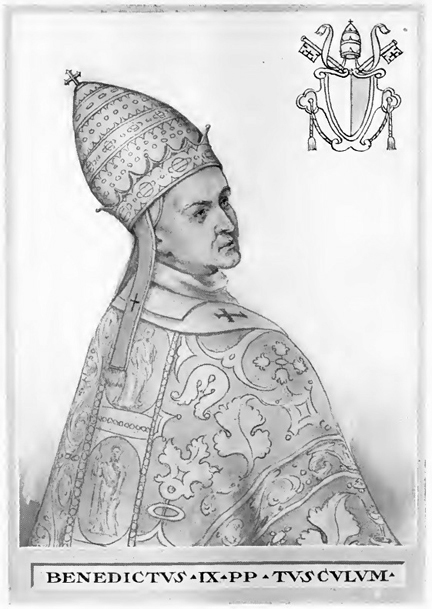
Pope Benedict IX (1032–1044; 1045; 1047–1048) served three non-consecutive terms as pope.

Due to the unprecedented actions of Pope Benedict IX (the only pope currently regarded as having served multiple, non-consecutive terms), Henry III found three different popes in 1046 when he arrived in Rome seeking coronation as Holy Roman Emperor. Henry III decided to depose all three and install Pope Clement II (1046–47).

== Holy Roman Empire (1048–1059) ==
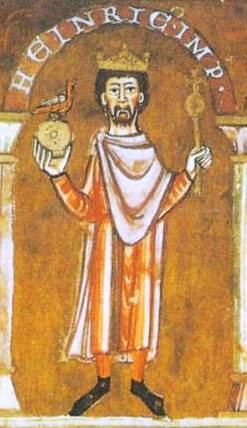
Henry IV was unable to maintain his father's control over papal selection.

Henry III also installed the 3 successors to Pope Leo IX (1049–54), all Germans, without the formality of election. However, the death of Henry III and his succession by the child Henry IV, Holy Roman Emperor allowed Pope Nicholas II (1059–61) to promulgate In Nomine Domini in 1059, ensuring that all future elections and, eventually, conclaves, would conform to a basic procedure that has remained largely unchanged for almost a millennium. This period also overlapped with what would later be described as The Great East–West Schism.
