= Milo (bishop of Trier) =

Bishop of Reims and Archbishop of Trier

Milo Archbishop of Trier
- Church: Chalcedonian Christianity
- Province: Austrasia
- Diocese: Trier, Rhineland-Palatinate, Austrasia (today Germany) Reims, Rhineland-Palatinate, Austrasia (today France)
- Appointed: 722
- In office: 722
- Retired: 744
- Predecessor: St. Leudwinus
- Successor: Abel
- Opposed to: St. Boniface

Orders
- Ordination: Benedictine

Personal details
- Born: Milo of Trier Trier, Rhineland-Palatinate, Austrasia (today Germany)
- Died: Meulenwald, Rhineland-Palatinate, Austrasia (today Germany)
- Buried: Meulenwald, Rhineland-Palatinate, Austrasia (today Germany)
- Denomination: Christian
- Parents: St. Leudwinus and Willigard of Bavaria

Milo of Trier (died 762 or 763) was the son of St. Leudwinus and his successor as Archbishop of Trier and Archbishop of Reims. His great-uncle Saint Basinus had preceded his father as Archbishop of Trier. He was the great-grandson of Saint Sigrada, and Saint Leodegarius was his great-uncle.

== Early life ==
Milo was the son of the Leudwinus of Trier and Willigard of Bavaria. He was born a nobleman and later styled Count of Trier. His brother was Wido (Gui), Count of Hornbach. Rotrude of Hesbaye was possibly his sister. Lambert of Maastricht was a kinsman.

Milo received a monastic education. Prior to his ecclesiastical career, Milo also had a military career, something he had in common with his putative brother-in-law Charles Martel. It is not clear whether Milo received anything more than a diaconal ordination.

== Archbishop of Trier ==
As the scion of one of the most powerful Frankish clans in Austrasia, Milo's future seemed secure. He succeeded his father as Archbishop of Trier becoming the third generation of his family to hold this position.

== Bishop of Reims ==
When Charles Martel drove Saint Rigobert from Reims, Milo was appointed his successor. As bishop, Milo became a controversial figure for the Church. His avarice and fondness of earthly pleasures soon placed him in opposition with the church. Milo did not lead a spiritual life and flagrantly ignored the Rules of Saint Benedict that governed his colleagues. Paul Fouracre says that Boniface considered Milo and bishops like him "warlike, adulterous, and prone to help themselves to church property".

Milo habitually used church property for his personal and political purposes, usually to indulge his illegitimate sons. He accumulated much of the riches of his dioceses and developed a reputation for corruption. Pope Zachary counseled Boniface about dealing with disreputable prelates such as Milo. "As for Milo and his like, who are doing great injury to the church of God, preach in season and out of season, according to the word of the Apostle, that they cease from their evil ways."

Accounts of Milo's time as bishop are collected in the Gesta Treverorum.

== Deposition ==
Politically, Milo was a formidable opponent of Boniface's reforms of the church in the eastern Frankish Empire. However, when Milo's own behavior invited the criticism of Pope Zachary, Boniface seized the opportunity and began a campaign to have Milo replaced.

In March 744, Boniface successfully pursued the Council of Soissons to remove Milo as Archbishop of Trier. By that time, Milo's behavior had become so repugnant even his formidable political connections could not save him. Though he put up a lengthy resistance, Milo was deposed as bishop and replaced by Abel.

== Death ==
Milo was killed by a wild boar in a hunting accident in Meulenwald near Trier sometime between 753 and 758.

Since the 4th century, it had been a tradition to bury the bishops of Trier in the crypt at St. Maximin's Abbey in Trier. However, due to his controversial life, Milo was not given this honor and was instead buried near the scene of the accident where a memorial, The Cross of Milo, was erected.

== Notes ==
Catholic Church titles
Preceded by St. Leudwinus	Archbishop of Trier c. 722–762/3?	Succeeded by Wiomad
Preceded by Rigobert	Bishop of Reims c. 722–762/3?	Succeeded by Abel
