= Legatine council =

Ecclesiastical council presided over by a papal legate

A legatine council or legatine synod is an ecclesiastical council or synod that is presided over by a papal legate.

According to Pope Gregory VII, writing in the Dictatus papae, a papal legate "presides over all bishops in a council, even if he is inferior in rank, and he can pronounce sentence of deposition against them". During the Middle Ages, a legatine council was the usual means by which a papal legate imposed his directives.

Many councils in the Middle Ages were legatine councils, including the council held by Hugh of Die at Autun in 1077. Another was a series of councils held by Cuno of Praeneste in 1114 and 1115, held respectively at Beauvais, Rheims and Chalon, which excommunicated Emperor Henry V, although Pope Paschal II eventually refused to ratify Cuno's actions. In 1116 Cuno demanded that Paschal either confirm or reject the legate's actions, but Paschal did neither. Early in the history of the Crusader states, a number of legatine councils were held in the Kingdom of Jerusalem that not only appointed and deposed ecclesiastics, but also regulated the church government. Legatine councils were also held in the German Empire during the 12th-century.

Legatine councils were held in medieval England, early examples being two held in short succession by King Offa of Mercia in the year 786 and known only by this generic term. One of the recorded two attending legates, George of Ostia, notes that the languages of communication were Latin and "theodisce" (Germanic) "for the better comprehension of all". Further such councils included the Council of Westminster in 1125, and a series of legatine councils held from 1139 to 1151, which unlike the 1125 council, were summoned by English ecclesiastics appointed as legates by the pope, rather than legates who had been sent to England by the papacy.
