= Antipope Constantine II =

8th-century antipope

- Elected: 28 June 767
- Papacy began: 28 June 767
- Papacy ended: 6 August 768
- Predecessor: Paul I
- Opposed to: Philip; Stephen III

Orders
- Ordination: 28–29 June 767 by George, Bishop of Praeneste
- Consecration: 5 July 767 by George, Bishop of Praeneste

Personal details
- Died: c. 769

Antipope Constantine II (Latin: Constantinus; died c. 769) was a Roman prelate who claimed the papacy from 28 June 767 to 6 August 768. He was overthrown through the intervention of the Lombards and tortured before he was condemned and expelled from the Church during the Lateran Council of 769.

Upon the death of Pope Paul I various factions contended to secure the appointment of their respective candidates as pope. Constantine, although a layman, was supported by a group of Tuscan nobles, led by his brother. They secured his election by force of arms. The following spring, local authorities, with Lombard support, succeeded in deposing him. The Lombards then attempted to install their own candidate, a priest named Philip. He, in turn, was overthrown the same day by the local authorities who then elected the churchman Stephen. For a short time Constantine retained some support outside the city, which resulted in armed conflict. As part of a generally unsuccessful attempt to hinder antipopes from claiming the title, the supporters of Stephen had the imprisoned Constantine blinded. After that, Constantine was held in close confinement in a monastery. He is today considered an antipope.

== Background ==
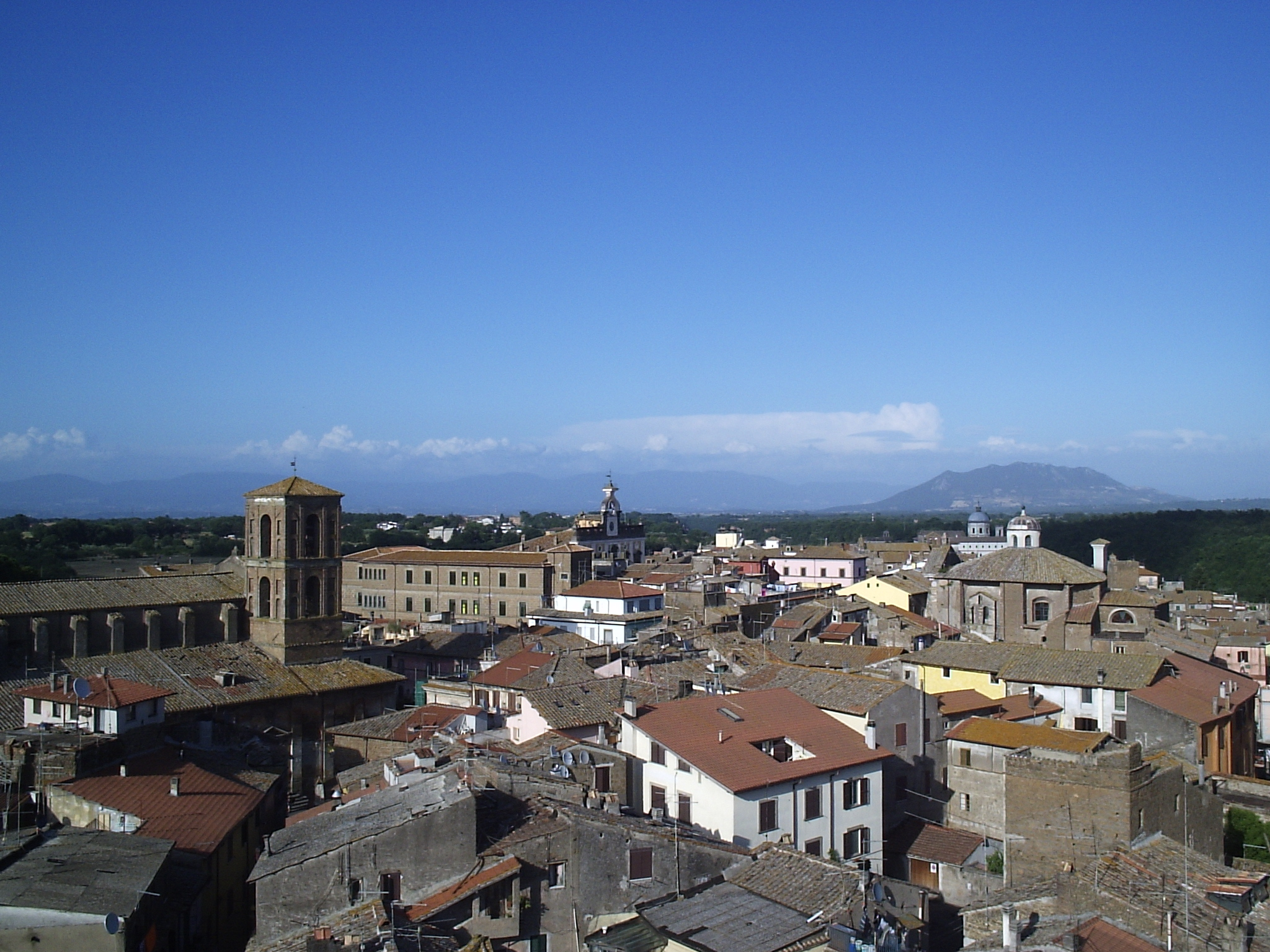
The town of Nepi, where Constantine II was born

Constantine was born into a noble Roman family in Nepi near Viterbo. He was one of four brothers, of which the most prominent was Toto of Nepi. Toto, the papal governor and self-styled "Duke" of Nepi, began to position himself to take advantage of the expected death of Pope Paul I, and elevate his own candidate onto the papal throne. Christophorus, the primicerius of the notaries, forced Toto to take an oath to respect the traditional clerical method of papal elections. Toto, however, having retired to his estates in Nepi, with the help of Constantine and his other brothers collected troops from his duchy and other parts of Tuscany, in addition to arming a group of peasants to swell the numbers.

== Election ==
On 28 June, hearing that Pope Paul was on the verge of dying, Toto and his armed men forced their way into the city through the Gate of St. Pancratius. With Paul’s death, Toto made his way to the Basilica of the Apostles where the other members of the papal court and Roman nobility were gathering, and there Christophorus had everyone swear that they would all uphold each other’s rights during the upcoming election. However, as soon as the meeting had broken up, Toto’s armed retainers had assembled in his house at Rome and elected his brother Constantine as pope.

Since Constantine was still a layperson, he needed to be ordained deacon and priest and then consecrated as bishop in rapid succession. Although frowned upon by canon law, this approach was far from unknown at the time. Therefore, accompanied by a group of armed men, he was escorted to the Lateran Palace, where they attempted to force George, the Bishop of Praeneste, to ordain Constantine as a monk. George threw himself at Constantine’s feet, begging Constantine not to make him do this. However, Constantine and his supporters made it clear that he would be forced to, one way or another. George therefore performed the ceremony, ordaining Constantine as a monk. The next day, 29 June, Bishop George made Constantine a subdeacon followed immediately by his elevation to deacon. This contravened canon law, which required an interval between the giving of the major orders of at least one day.

The Roman people were then required to take an oath of fidelity to Constantine, who again forced George of Praeneste, together with bishops Eustratius of Albano and Citonatus of Porto, to consecrate him as Bishop of Rome on 5 July 767. In the meantime, opposition to the antipope was being led by Christophorus, the Primicerius, and his son Sergius, the treasurer of the Roman church. Noting, however, that their lives were in danger, they fled for sanctuary to St. Peter’s Basilica, where they remained until April 768.

== Reign ==
One of Constantine’s first acts was to give notice to the Frankish King, Pepin the Short of his election, to secure the king’s approval of his actions. Constantine’s letter to Pepin declared that, against his wishes, he had been raised to the Apostolic See by "the people of Rome and the cities adjoining it", and that he hoped for the continuation of the friendship Pepin had shown to both his predecessors, Paul I and Stephen II. Pepin ignored this letter; Constantine wrote another, in which he declared that only the actions of the people had compelled him to take on the burdensome office. He begged Pepin to bestow his friendship, promising that he would be even more in his debt than his predecessors were, and to pay no attention to any slanderous accusations regarding him or his election. Pepin refused to reply to either letter.

On 12 August, Constantine received a letter, addressed to his predecessor Paul, from all the Eastern patriarchs apart from the Patriarch of Constantinople. It was a synodical letter of faith, sent by Theodore, Patriarch of Jerusalem, and endorsed by Theodore, Patriarch of Antioch, and Cosmas, Patriarch of Alexandria. It was also endorsed by a large number of the eastern Metropolitan bishops. In it, it described their support of the veneration of Icons, and their opposition to the iconoclasm being enforced by the Byzantine Emperor Constantine V. Constantine had the letter read before the Roman people, after which he forwarded it to King Pepin.

Meanwhile, Christophorus and Sergius had hatched a plot with key supporters in the city. They begged Constantine to allow them to leave the city and become monks in the Monastery of Our Saviour, near Rieti in the Duchy of Spoleto. Swearing an oath to that effect, they were allowed to depart around 10 April 768. Instead of going to the monastery, however, father and son headed straight for Theodicius of Spoleto, who arranged an interview with Desiderius, King of the Lombards. Desiderius agreed to provide Christophorus and Sergius with troops from Spoleto, and that he would support their march on Rome to overthrow the antipope. With these troops and a Lombard priest named Waldipert, Sergius returned to the city, helped through the Gate of St. Pancratius on 30 July 768 by supporters within. His force took the walls, but were hesitant to descend the Janiculum Hill into the city.

As soon as word came through that the Lombards had entered the city, Toto came out to confront them with his own forces. During a battle in the streets of Rome, Toto was killed, and his brother Passivus rushed to warn Constantine to flee. The two brothers finally shut themselves within the oratory of St. Cesarius, managing to hide for a few hours before they were discovered and thrown into prison by Roman army officers.

== Deposition and mutilation ==
Whilst Constantine was in prison, there was an attempt to install another antipope, Philip, followed by the election of Pope Stephen III. After his election, followers of the new pope began attacking key members of Constantine’s regime, including Bishop Theodore, the Vice-dominus and Constantine’s brother, Passivus, both of whom were blinded. Constantine was taken from prison, put on a horse and driven through the city on top of a woman’s saddle, with heavy weights attached to his feet, among jeering crowds. He was then imprisoned in the monastery of San Saba.

On 6 August, Constantine was taken to the Lateran Basilica, and canonically degraded. His pallium was thrown at his feet by a subdeacon, and his papal shoes were cut off his feet. There was still support for Constantine, however. The town of Alatri, under the leadership of its governor, Gracilis, who held the title of a Tribune, came out in support of the antipope. He pillaged the region around Campania, but the town was stormed by a force of Romans, Tuscans and armed troops from various parts of Campania, and Gracilis was captured. Concerned that Constantine was still a focus of dissent, the papal Chartularius, Gratiosus, and two other officials, gave permission for Constantine to be taken from the monastic prison early in the morning, blinded him, and left him lying in the street. They prohibited anyone from giving him aid; after 24 hours, however, complaints from the people prompted the monks to re-imprison him in the monastery.

In April 769, Pope Stephen III opened a new Lateran Council; a major topic for discussion was the elevation of Constantine. The blinded prisoner was brought before the council, where they questioned his elevation to the Apostolic See when he was still a layman. Constantine responded that he had been forced to take on the role, as the Roman people had been looking for someone to fix the problems left behind by Pope Paul I. He then confessed to the charges, and threw himself on the mercy of the synod. On the following day, however, he retracted his confession, arguing that his actions had not been any different to other papal elections in the past. He stated:

I have done nothing, my brethren, which cannot be excused by recent examples. Sergius, a layman like myself, has been consecrated metropolitan of Ravenna; the layman Stephen has even been ordained Bishop of Naples...

Infuriated by his arguments, the synod ordered Constantine beaten, had his tongue torn out, and excommunicated him from the Church. Constantine's acts and rulings were then publicly burnt before the entire synod. He was returned to his monastery, and no further mention of him is known.
