= Leo I (archbishop of Ravenna) =

Leo I Archbishop of Ravenna
- Church: Catholic Church
- Diocese: Archdiocese of Ravenna
- Elected: 769
- In office: 770-777
- Predecessor: Sergius
- Successor: Giovanni VI

Leo I (or Leone) was archbishop of Ravenna from A.D. 770, following a disputed election, until his death in A.D. 777. Archbishop Leo played an important role in the arrest of Paul Afiarta and was the subject of letters from Pope Hadrian I to Charlemagne collected in the Codex Carolinus and dated from late 774.

== Disputed Election ==
Sergius, Archbishop of Ravenna, died on 8 August 769. Leo, then Archdeacon, was elected to succeed him and received official papal approval. However, the election was challenged by a layman named Michael, backed by Duke Maurice of Rimini with the support of Desiderius, King of the Lombards. Archbishop Sergius had, as argued by Thomas F. X. Noble, been loyal to the papacy in the face of conflict coming from the Lombards, or at the very least had refrained from being disloyal. The death of Sergius created an opportunity for Desiderius to bring his influence to bear upon the diocese. Louis Marie DeCormenin wrote in his history that Leo was imprisoned at Rimini by Lombard soldiers while Michael occupied the see at Ravenna. Noble's account does not include this detail. Supporters of Michael in the city of Ravenna sent requests to Pope Stephen III for his consecration as Archbishop with the bribe of gifts in return. Stephen refused and according to DeCormenin had Michael excommunicated.

Leo's fortunes took a positive turn during a diplomatic mission he made to Rome in 770. There, Bertrada of Laon, the mother of Charlemagne, agreed with Pope Stephen that her son would provide assistance to resolve the dispute over Ravenna. Charlemagne sent his missus Hugbald to arrest Michael and bring him to Rome, this permitting Leo to occupy at last the see of Ravenna and begin to govern.

== Arrest of Paul Afiarta ==
In 772, following his election, Pope Hadrian I set out to remove the influence of Paul Afiarta who, during the pontificate of Stephen III, had begun moving against supporters of the murdered Christophus and his son Sergius. Hadrian reintroduced those who had been purged by Afiarta and sent him away on a diplomatic mission to Pavia. This intended to allow time for Hadrian to organise a case against him, however the mission did not reach Pavia before Desiderius launched an attack against the Papacy and captured Faenza, Ferrara, and Comacchio. Leo, following this attack, had written Hadrian to request support as Lombard forces began to pose a threat to Ravenna itself.

During this chaos Hadrian decided to act against Afiarta and ordered Archbishop Leo to have him seized at Ravenna on his journey back to Rome. A tribune named Julian was sent on behalf of Hadrian to Leo at Ravenna to request this and he was captured. In a further letter Hadrian gave Leo greater details as to how he should handle Afiarta, ordering that the prisoner should be sent into exile, but Leo, having previously disputed with agents of Desiderius similar to Afiarta, wanted him executed. When papal envoys travelled to deal with Afiarta they found he was dead

According to DeCormenin, Afiarta was beheaded.

== Conflict with Pope Hadrian I ==
Leo had twice now been at odds with agents of Desiderius and when the Lombard Kingdom fell to Charlemagne in 774 he was relieved of any neighbouring threat. Leo is alleged to have begun to manage the territory of his diocese personally as a new form of the exarchate. This prompted four letters written between 774 and 776 from Pope Hadrian I to Charlemagne, found collected in the Codex Carolinus. In these letters Hadrian accuses Leo of subjugating cities in Emilia and the Pentapolis under his firm control, excluding papal officials from them and from the rest of his diocese, and even placing Ravenna under his own personal government. To add greater insult Leo excused his actions by claiming that he had the permission of the Papacy to do this. Another issue that Hadrian had with Leo was that the latter had allegedly had been in contact with Charlemagne without first going through Rome. In the letter no. 53 of the Codex Carolinus, dated 775 it is suggested that Archbishop Leo had travelled to the Frankish court to meet with Charlemagne in person.

By means of his correspondence with Charlemagne in 775 regarding the Leo's case, Hadrian had hoped to achieve a meeting with Charlemagne himself at Rome later that year but by November this appeared unlikely. Archbishop Leo's role in driving a wedge between the Frankish King and the Pope has been questioned by historians writing on the events. Janet Nelson wrote in her biography of Charlemagne, King and Emperor: A New Life of Charlemagne, that Charlemagne had been supporting Leo's moves against the Papacy in order to strengthen his own control over the diocese. In contrast, Thomas Noble wrote that while Charlemagne was indeed disposed towards good relations with Leo, he was not an active supporter of his cause against Rome. Noble believes this friendly disposition to be a natural result of Charlemagne's initial intervention to bring Leo to bring to the episcopal throne of Ravenna.

== See also ==
- Bishop of Ravenna

== Bibliography ==
- DeCormenin, Louis Marie (1857). A Complete History of the Popes of Rome, from Saint Peter, the First Bishop to Pius the Ninth.
- Nelson, Janet L. (2019). King and Emperor: A New Life of Charlemagne. Allen Lane.
- Nelson, Jinty (2016), Nelson, Jinty; Herrin, Judith (eds.), "Charlemagne and Ravenna" Ravenna, its role in earlier medieval change and exchange, School of Advanced Study, University of London, pp. 239–252, retrieved 2019-11-04.
- Noble, Thomas F. X. (1984). The Republic of St Peter. Pennsylvania: University of Pennsylvania Press
