= Synods of Westminster =

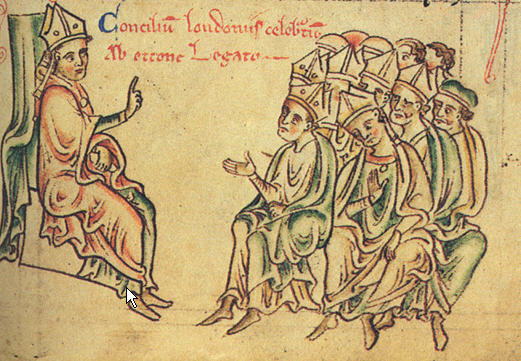
Legatine Council in London, 1237

Synods of Westminster were certain of the more important ecclesiastical councils held within the present bounds of London. Though the precise locality is occasionally uncertain, the majority of the medieval synods assembled in the chapter-house of old St Paul's, or the former chapel of St Catherine within the precincts of Westminster Abbey or at Lambeth. The councils were of various types, each with a constitutional history of its own. Before the reign of Edward I, when convocation assumed substantially its present form, there were convened in London various diocesan, provincial, national and legatine synods; during the following six centuries, however, the chief ecclesiastical assemblies held there were convocations of the province of Canterbury.

== Eleventh century ==
The first really notable council at St Paul's was that of 1075 under the presidency of Lanfranc; it renewed ancient regulations, forbade simony and permitted three bishops to remove from country places to Salisbury, Chichester and Chester respectively.

== Twelfth century ==
In 1102 a national synod at Westminster under Anselm of Canterbury adopted canons against simony, clerical marriages and slavery.

The councils of 1126, 1127 and 1138 were legatine, that of 1175 provincial; their canons, chiefly re-enactments, throw light on the condition of the clergy at that time. The canons of 1200 are based in large measure on recommendations of the Lateran Council of 1179.

== Thirteenth to fifteenth century ==
At St Paul's the legatine constitutions of Otto of Tonengo were published at a synod of 1237, those of Ottoboni in 1268: these were the most important national councils held after the independence of York had been established. A synod at Lambeth in 1281 put forth canons none too welcome to Edward I; they included a detailed scheme for the religious instruction of the faithful.

During the next two centuries the councils devoted much attention to heresy:

- eight propositions concerning the body of Christ after his death were rejected at St Mary-le-Bow in 1286;
- the Expulsion of the Jews from England was sanctioned by a legatine synod of Westminster in 1291;
- ten theses of John Wyclif were condemned at the Dominican friary in 1382
- eighteen articles drawn from Wyclif's Trialogus met the same fate at St Paul's in 1396;
- John Oldcastle was condemned at St Paul's in 1413.

The 14th-century synods at St Paul's concerned themselves largely with the financial and moral status of the clergy, and made many regulations regarding their dress and behaviour (1328, 1342, 1343; cf. 1463).

== Later synods ==
From the time of Edward VI on, many of the most vital changes in ecclesiastical discipline were adopted in convocations at St Paul's and in the Abbey. Among the most important were those of 1547, 1552, 1554, 1562, 1571, 1604, 1605, 1640 and 1661.

In 1852 there was held the first of a series of synods of the newly organized Catholic archdiocese of Westminster. For the Pan-Anglican Synods see Lambeth Conferences.
