= Archdeacon Theophylact =

Theophylact was an archdeacon of the Roman Church. After the death of Pope Stephen II in 757, a faction wanted to place him on the Holy See, but the majority chose the deceased Pope's brother Paul as successor. Theophylact remained in the papal service, in 794 serving as one of Adrian I's legates to the Synod of Frankfurt.
