= Rigobert =

French bishop and Catholic saint (died c. 743)

Saint Rigobert
- Born: ?
- Died: c. 750
- Venerated in: Catholic Church
- Feast: January 4

Rigobert (died c. 750) was a Benedictine monk and later abbot of the Abbey Saint-Pierre of Orbais who subsequently succeeded Saint Rieul as bishop of Reims in 698. He is venerated as a saint in the Catholic Church.

== Biography ==
Rigobert baptized Charles Martel, but Charles afterwards had him brutally driven from the see and replaced, for political reasons, by the warlike and unpriestly Milo, who was already Archbishop of Trier. Rigobert took refuge in Aquitaine and then retired to Gernicourt, in the Diocese of Soissons, where he led a life in the exercises of penance and prayer.

He died about the year 750, and was buried in the church of Saint Peter at Gernicourt, which he had built. Hincmar translated his relics to the abbey of Saint Theodoric, and later, to the church of Saint Dionysius at Reims. Fulk, Hincmar's successor, removed them into the metropolitan Church of Our Lady of Reims, in which the greater part is preserved in a rich shrine, though a portion is kept in the church of Saint Dionysius at Reims, and another portion in the cathedral of Paris, where a chapel bears his name.

His feast day is 4 January.

== Bibliography ==
Catholic Church titles
Preceded by Rieul	Bishop of Rheims; 698–717	Succeeded by Milo
