= Capitulary of Soissons =

Start of the capitulary in a 10th- or 11th-century manuscript from Lotharingia

The Capitulary of Soissons is a record of the council held in Soissons on 2 or 3 March 744 under the aegis of Pippin III, the mayor of the palace for Neustria under King Childeric III. The assembly included both lay and ecclesiastical leaders, including 23 bishops. The council was limited Neustria, while in Austrasia a council was held about the same time at Les Estinnes by Pippin's brother Carloman. Called a synodum vel concilio in the Latin of the capitulary, the assembly may have combined a church synod with the annual Frankish war council, the Marchfield. The two groups probably met in separate sessions. The capitulary was promulgated by Pippin and credits him with convoking the council. The king is named only in the dating clause. He was probably in attendance.

Unlike in earlier conciliar acta, the attending bishops did not subscribe the capitulary. The "presiding spirit" was the missionary bishop Boniface. The purpose of the council was to restore discipline and structure to the church. Two bishops were raised to archbishops, Abel of Reims and Ardobert of Sens. A certain preacher named Aldebert was condemned by the bishops as a heretic and the oratories and cruciculas (small crosses) he had erected were ordered destroyed. Monks and nuns were ordered to cease wandering about and priests to cease fornication, wearing lay apparel and hunting with dogs. It was ordained that synods should be held annually.

The council's plan to appoint two new archbishops with real authority over their suffragans received from the pope was soon quashed in favour of maintaining the traditional role of the metropolitan bishop. In the end, only Grimo, the metropolitan of Rouen, received the pallium from Rome.

The Capitulary of Soissons is preserved in six manuscripts.

== Works cited ==
- Collins, Roger (1998). Charlemagne. University of Toronto Press.
- Glatthaar, Michael (2020). "Boniface and the Reform Councils". In Michel Aaij; Shannon Godlove (eds.). A Companion to Boniface. Brill. pp. 219–246.
- Halfond, Gregory I. (2010). Archaeology of Frankish Church Councils, AD 511–768. Brill.
- Ubl, Karl; et al., eds. (2014). "Pippini principis capitulare Suessionense [BK 12]". Capitularia: Edition der fränkische Herrschererlasse.
- Wallace-Hadrill, J. M. (1983). The Frankish Church. Clarendon Press.
- Weidemann, Margarete (1998). "Zur Chronologie der Merowinger im 7. und 8. Jahrhundert". Francia. 25 (1): 177–230. doi:10.11588/fr.1998.1.61147.
