= Pope Stephen III =

Head of the Catholic Church from 768 to 772

- Bishop of Rome
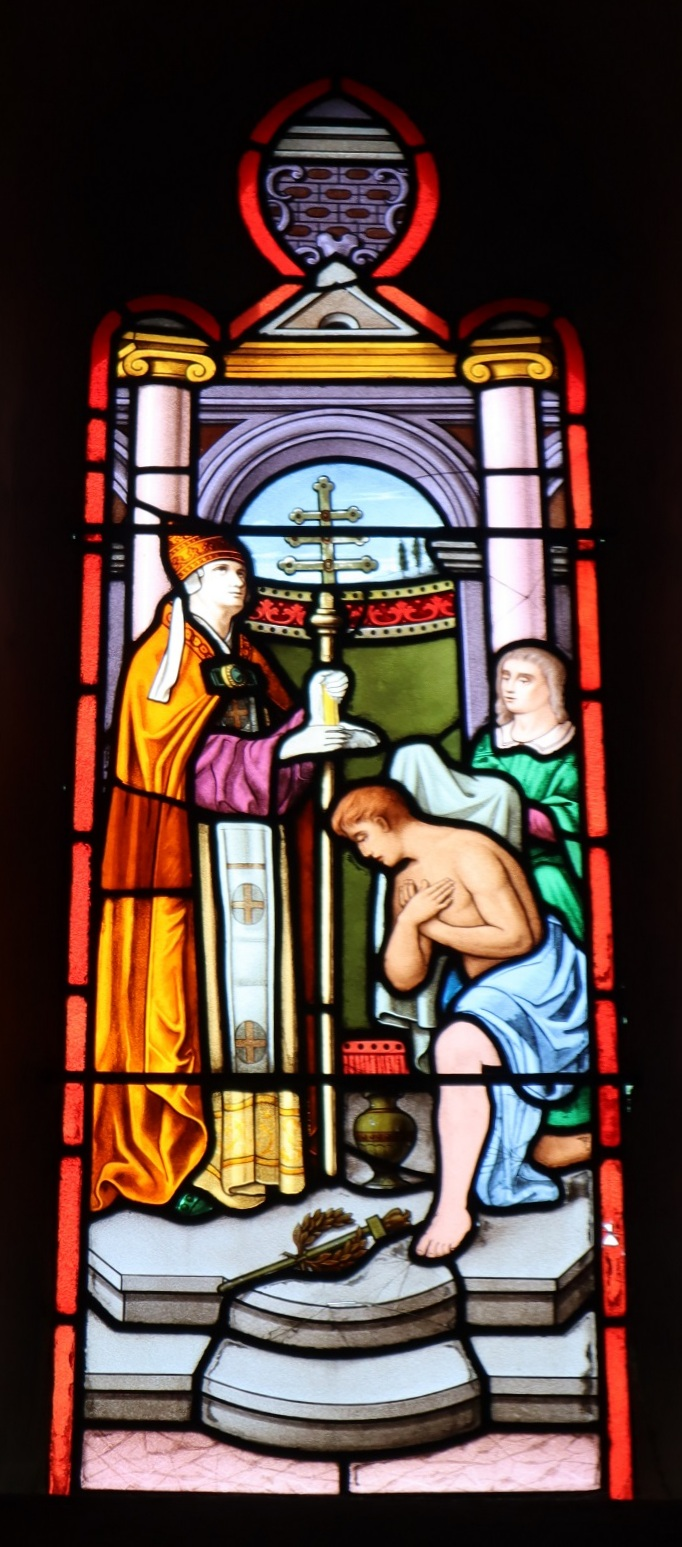
- Stained-glass window in Chantepie, France, showing Stephen III baptising Charlemagne.
- Church: Catholic Church
- Papacy began: 7 August 768
- Papacy ended: 24 January 772
- Predecessor: Paul I
- Successor: Adrian I
- Opposed to: Constantine II

Personal details
- Born: 720 Sicily, Byzantine Empire
- Died: 24 January 772 (aged 52) Rome, Papal States

Pope Stephen III (Latin: Stephanus III; 720 – 24 January 772) was the bishop of Rome and leader of the Papal States from 7 August 768 to his death on 24 January 772. Stephen was a Benedictine monk who worked in the Lateran Palace during the reign of Pope Zachary. In the midst of a tumultuous contest by rival factions to name a successor to Pope Paul I, Stephen was elected with the support of the Roman officials. He summoned the Lateran Council of 769, which sought to limit the influence of the nobles in papal elections. The council also opposed iconoclasm.

== Early career ==
A Greek born in Sicily, Stephen III was the son of a man named Olivus. Coming to Rome during the pontificate of Pope Gregory III, he was placed in the monastery of St. Chrysogonus, where he became a Benedictine monk. During the pontificate of Pope Zachary, he was ordained a priest, after which the pope decided to keep him to work at the Lateran Palace. Stephen gradually rose to high office in the service of successive popes, and was at the bedside of the dying Pope Paul I as powerful factions began manoeuvring to ensure the election of their own candidate in late June 767.

== Election ==
768 was consumed by the rival claims of antipopes Constantine II (a layman puppet forcibly installed by a faction of Tuscan nobles) and Philip (the candidate of the Lombards), who were forced out of office by the efforts of Christophorus, the primicerius of the notaries, and his son Sergius, the treasurer of the Roman Church. With the capture of Constantine II, Christophorus set about organising a canonical election, and on 1 August he summoned not only the Roman clergy and army, but also the people to assemble before the Church of St. Adrian in the area of the old Comitium. Here, on 7 August, the combined assembly elected Stephen as pope. They then proceeded to the Church of Santa Cecilia in Trastevere, where they acclaimed Stephen as pope-elect, and escorted him to the Lateran Palace.

At this point, supporters of the Pope-elect Stephen began to brutally attack key members of Constantine's regime, including Constantine himself, who was hounded through the streets of Rome, with heavy weights attached to his feet. Bishop Theodore, Constantine's vice-dominus, was blinded and had his tongue cut out, while Constantine's brother, Passivus, was also blinded. Constantine was officially dethroned on 6 August, and Stephen was consecrated pope on the following day. Retributions continued even after the consecration of Stephen; the town of Alatri revolted in support of Constantine, and after its capture, the key members of the revolt were blinded and had their tongues ripped out. Then on the orders of the papal chartularius, Gratiosus, Constantine was removed from his monastic cell, blinded, and left on the streets of Rome with specific instructions that no-one should aid him. Finally, on a charge of conspiring to kill Christophorus and many other nobles, with the intent of handing over the city to the Lombards, the priest Waldipert, who was the prime mover in the elevation of Philip, was arrested, blinded, and soon died of his wounds.

The role of Stephen III in these events is somewhat obscure. According to the historian Horace Mann, Stephen was an impotent observer, and that the responsible agent was in reality the chartularius, Gratiosus. However, according to Louis Marie DeCormenin, Stephen was the key person responsible for issuing the orders, and took great delight in destroying his rival and his rival's supporters. A middle position was taken by the historian Ferdinand Gregorovius, who observed that Stephen, while he may not have instigated or ordered the atrocities, did not seek to prevent them either, either through self-interest or the weakness of his position. What is clear, however, is that the recent creation of the Papal States had seen the traditional rivalries of the ruling families of Rome transformed into a murderous desire to control this new temporal power in Italy, dragging the papacy with it.

== Pontificate ==
=== Lateran Council ===
With Constantine's supporters largely dealt with, Stephen wrote to the Frankish king, Pepin the Short, notifying him of his election, and asking for a number of bishops to participate in a council he was seeking to hold to discuss the recent confusion. As Pepin had died, it was Charlemagne and Carloman I who agreed to send twelve bishops to participate in the Lateran Council of 769. The council saw the final condemnation of Constantine II, who was beaten and had his tongue removed before being returned to his monastic cell. All clerical appointments made by Constantine were declared null and void. It also set about establishing strict rules for papal elections, thereby restricting the involvement of the nobility in subsequent elections. Finally, the rulings of the Council of Hieria were rejected, and the practice of devotion to icons was confirmed (see iconoclasm).

In 770, Stephen was asked to confirm the election of Michael, a layperson, as archbishop of Ravenna. In fact, Michael, in league with the Lombard king Desiderius and the duke of Rimini, had imprisoned Leo I, who had been elected first. Stephen refused to confirm Michael's election; citing the conventions of the Lateran council, he sent letters and envoys to Michael, demanding that he stand down. Michael refused, and the stand-off continued for over a year, until the arrival of the Frankish ambassador in Ravenna along with the papal legates encouraged Michael's opponents to overthrow him, and send him to Rome in chains. Leo followed soon after, when Stephen consecrated him as archbishop.

=== Frankish-Lombard alliance ===
Throughout his pontificate, Stephen was apprehensive about the expansionist plans of the Lombards. Placing his hope in the Franks, he attempted to mediate in the quarrels between Charlemagne and Carloman I, Pepin's sons and successors, which were only helping the Lombards' cause in Italy. In 769, he helped them reconcile, and pressured them to support the still infant Papal States, by reminding them of the support that their father had given the papacy in the past. He also begged them to intercede on his behalf by entering into discussions with the Lombards.

Consequently, an embassy was sent to the Lombard king, Desiderius, in 770, which included Charlemagne's mother, Bertrada of Laon. Their intervention achieved a result favourable to the papacy by restoring to the pope the parts of Benevento that the popes claimed. To Stephen's consternation, however, Desiderius and Bertrada entered into discussions about a possible marriage between Desiderius' daughter, Desiderata, and one of Bertrada's sons. It is also possible that discussions took place around the marriage of Charlemagne's sister, Gisela to Desiderius' son, Adalgis.

Stephen therefore wrote to both Charlemagne and Carloman, protesting about the proposed alliance. Apart from noting that both men were already married, he reminded them of their promises to previous popes, that they would consider the pope's enemies as their enemies, and that they had promised to Saint Peter to resist the Lombards and restore the rights of the Church. He wrote:

"You who are already, by the will of God and the commands of your father, lawfully married to noble wives of your own nation, whom you are bound to cherish. And certainly it is not lawful for you to put away the wives you have and marry others, or ally yourselves in marriage with a foreign people, a thing never done by any of your ancestors.... It is wicked of you even to entertain the thought of marrying again when you are already married. You ought not to act thus, who profess to follow the law of God, and punish others to prevent men acting in this unlawful manner. Such things do the heathen. But they ought not to be done by you who are Christians, a holy people and a kingly priesthood."

Stephen's pleas fell on deaf ears, and Charlemagne married Desiderata in 770, temporarily cementing a familial alliance with the Lombards.

=== Fall of Christophorus and Sergius ===
Throughout 769 and 770, Stephen continued to rely on the support and advice of Christophorus and Sergius who had placed him on the papal throne. Their antipathy towards the Lombards and general pro-Frankish stance caused King Desiderius to engineer their downfall. He bribed the Papal Chamberlain, Paulus Afiarta, and other members of the papal court to spread rumors about them to the pope. When Desiderius attempted to enter Rome in 771 with an army, claiming to be on a pilgrimage to pray at the shrine of St. Peter, Christophorus and Sergius shut the gates of the city against them. Arriving at the gates and seeing armed troops manning the walls, the Lombard king asked to speak to the Pope, who came out to him. During Stephen's absence, Afiarta and his supporters sought to stir up a mob to overthrow Christophorus and Sergius. But the Primicerius and his son gained the upper hand, and forced Afiarta and his colleagues to flee to the Lateran Palace.

By this stage, Stephen had returned to the Lateran, and he was confronted in the Basilica of St. Theodore by the fleeing Afiarta and his co-conspirators being chased by Christophorus and his supporters. Apparently at this point, a suspicious Christophorus, believing that Stephen had entered into some agreement with Desiderius, forced Stephen into taking an oath that he would not turn Christophorus or his son over to the Lombards. After this, a furious Stephen berated Christophorus, demanded he stop harassing Afiarta, and ordered him and his followers to withdraw, to which Christophorus complied. The next day, Stephen fled to St. Peter's Basilica to seek the protection of Desiderius. The Lombard king, shutting Stephen up in his suites in the Basilica, made it clear to the Pope that the price for his help was to be the handing over of Christophorus and Sergius. The Pope sent two bishops to negotiate with Christophorus and Sergius, telling them that they must either retire to a monastery or come out to him at St. Peter's. At the same time, a message was sent from Desiderius to the people of the city, declaring that: "Pope Stephen bids you not to fight against your brethren, but to expel Christophorus from the city, and save it, yourselves, and your children."

This message from the Lombard king had the desired effect; Christophorus and Sergius began to suspect their associates, who in turn rapidly abandoned them. Both were reluctant to leave the city, but eventually both made their way to the Pope during the night. The next day Stephen was allowed to return to the city, while Christophorus and Sergius were left in Lombard hands. Negotiations to secure their release were unsuccessful, and before the day was out, Afiarta arrived with his partisans. After discussing the situation with Desiderius, they had both men blinded. Christophorus died after three days, while Sergius was kept in a cell in the Lateran.

In an attempt to forestall the potential intervention of Charlemagne, Desiderius had Stephen write a letter to the Frankish king wherein he declared that Christophorus and Sergius had been involved in a plot with an envoy of Charlemagne's brother, Carloman, to kill the Pope. Further, that Stephen had fled to Desiderius for protection, and that eventually Christophorus and Sergius were brought out against their will. While Stephen managed to save their lives, later a group of men had them blinded, but not on Stephen's orders. He then concludes that if it wasn't for "his most excellent son Desiderius", he would have been in fatal danger, and that Desiderius had reached an agreement with him to restore to the Church all the lands that she had claims on that were still in Lombard hands.

That such a letter was a fiction was demonstrated very soon after; when Stephen asked Desiderius to fulfil the promises he had made over the body of Saint Peter, the Lombard king responded: "Be content that I removed Christophorus and Sergius, who were ruling you, out of your way, and ask not for rights. Besides, if I do not continue to help you, great trouble will befall you. For Carloman, king of the Franks, is the friend of Christophorus and Sergius, and will be wishful to come to Rome and seize you."

=== Continuing troubles and the death of Stephen ===
Desiderius continued to stir trouble in Italy; in 771, he managed to convince the bishops of Istria to reject the authority of the Patriarch of Grado, and to have them place themselves under the Patriarch of Aquileia, which was directly under Lombard control. Stephen wrote to the rebellious bishops, suspending them and ordering them to place themselves once again under the authority of Grado, or face excommunication.

After Christophorus' fall, Paulus Afiarta continued to serve the papal court in a high capacity. During early 772, as Stephen fell ill and was soon clear that he was dying, Afiarta took advantage of this to exile a number of influential clergy and nobles from Rome, while others he put into prison. Then on 24 January, eight days before Stephen's death, Afiarta dragged the blinded Sergius from his cell in the Lateran and had him strangled.

Stephen died on 24 January or 1 February 772. He was succeeded by Adrian I.

== Local cult of sainthood ==
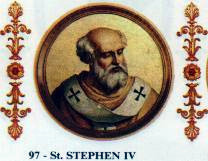
Pope Stephen III (portrait at Saint Paul Outside the Walls, c. 1850)

During the Middle Ages, Stephen III was considered a saint in his home island of Sicily. Various calendars, martyrologies, etc., such as the ancient calendar of the saints of Sicily, number Stephen among the saints, and assign his feast to 1 February. The citizens of Syracuse at one point attempted to convince the Holy See to officially endorse the sainthood of the pope, but this was not successful.

== Notes ==
Catholic Church titles
Preceded by Paul I	Pope; 768–772	Succeeded by Adrian I
