= Fulda monastery school =

High school in Fulda, Germany

The Fulda monastery school, also known as Rabanus-Maurus-Schule (Domgymnasium), named after its most famous teacher, Rabanus Maurus, is a grammar school in the German city of Fulda. It developed from the monastery school founded in AD 748 by the Abbot Sturmi and is therefore one of the oldest schools in Germany.
