= Pope Stephen II =

Head of the Catholic Church from 752 to 757

- Bishop of Rome
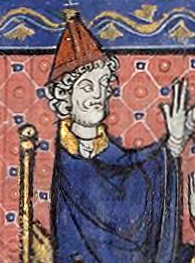
- Miniature of Stephen II, c. 1274
- Church: Catholic Church
- Papacy began: 26 March 752
- Papacy ended: 26 April 757
- Predecessor: Zachary
- Successor: Paul I

Orders
- Created cardinal: before 750 by Zachary

Personal details
- Born: 714 Rome, Italy, Eastern Roman Empire
- Died: 26 April 757 (aged 43) Rome, Papal States

Pope Stephen II (Latin: Stephanus II; 714 – 26 April 757) was the bishop of Rome from 752 until his death in 757. Stephen II marks the historical delineation between the Byzantine Papacy and the Frankish Papacy. During Stephen's pontificate, Rome was facing invasion by the Lombards when Stephen II went to Paris to seek assistance from Pepin the Short. Pepin defeated the Lombards and made a gift of land to the pope, eventually leading to the establishment of the Papal States.

== Early life ==
Stephen was born in Rome, Exarchate of Italy, Eastern Roman Empire. He was a member of the Orsini family.

== Election ==
In 751, the Lombard king Aistulf captured the Exarchate of Ravenna, and turned his attention to the Duchy of Rome. Stephen, a Roman aristocrat and member of the Orsini family, was selected on 26 March 752 to succeed Pope Zachary following the recent death of Pope-elect Stephen.

== Lombard threat ==
Relations were very strained in the mid-8th century between the papacy and the Eastern Roman emperors over the support of the Isaurian dynasty for iconoclasm. Likewise, maintaining political control over Rome became untenable as the Eastern Roman Empire itself was beset by the Abbasid Caliphate to the south and Bulgars to the northwest. Constantinople could send no troops, and Emperor Constantine V Copronymus, in answer to the repeated requests for help of the new pope, Stephen II, could only offer him the advice to act in accordance with the ancient policy of Rome, to pit some other Germanic tribe against the Lombards.

Stephen turned to Pepin the Short, the king of the Franks who had recently defeated the Muslim Umayyad invasion of Gaul. He traveled to Paris to plead for help in person against the surrounding Lombard and Muslim threats. On 6 January 754, Stephen re-consecrated Pepin as king. In return, Pepin assumed the role of ordained protector of the Church and set his sights on the Lombards, as well as addressing the threat of Islamic Al-Andalus. Pepin invaded Italy twice to settle the Lombard problem and delivered the territory between Rome and Ravenna to the papacy, but left the Lombard kings in possession of their kingdom.

== Duchy of Rome and the Papal States ==
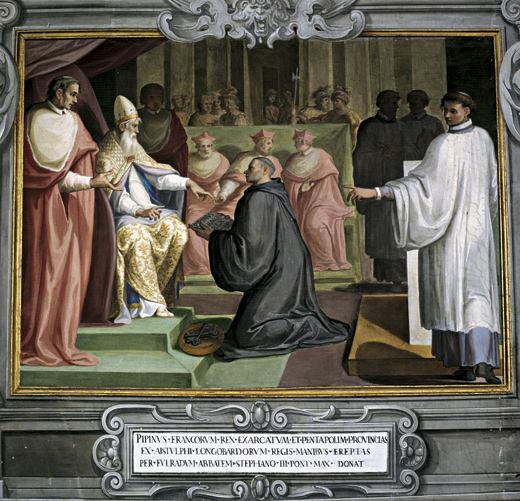
Painting depicting Abbot Fulrad giving Pepin's written guarantee to Stephen II

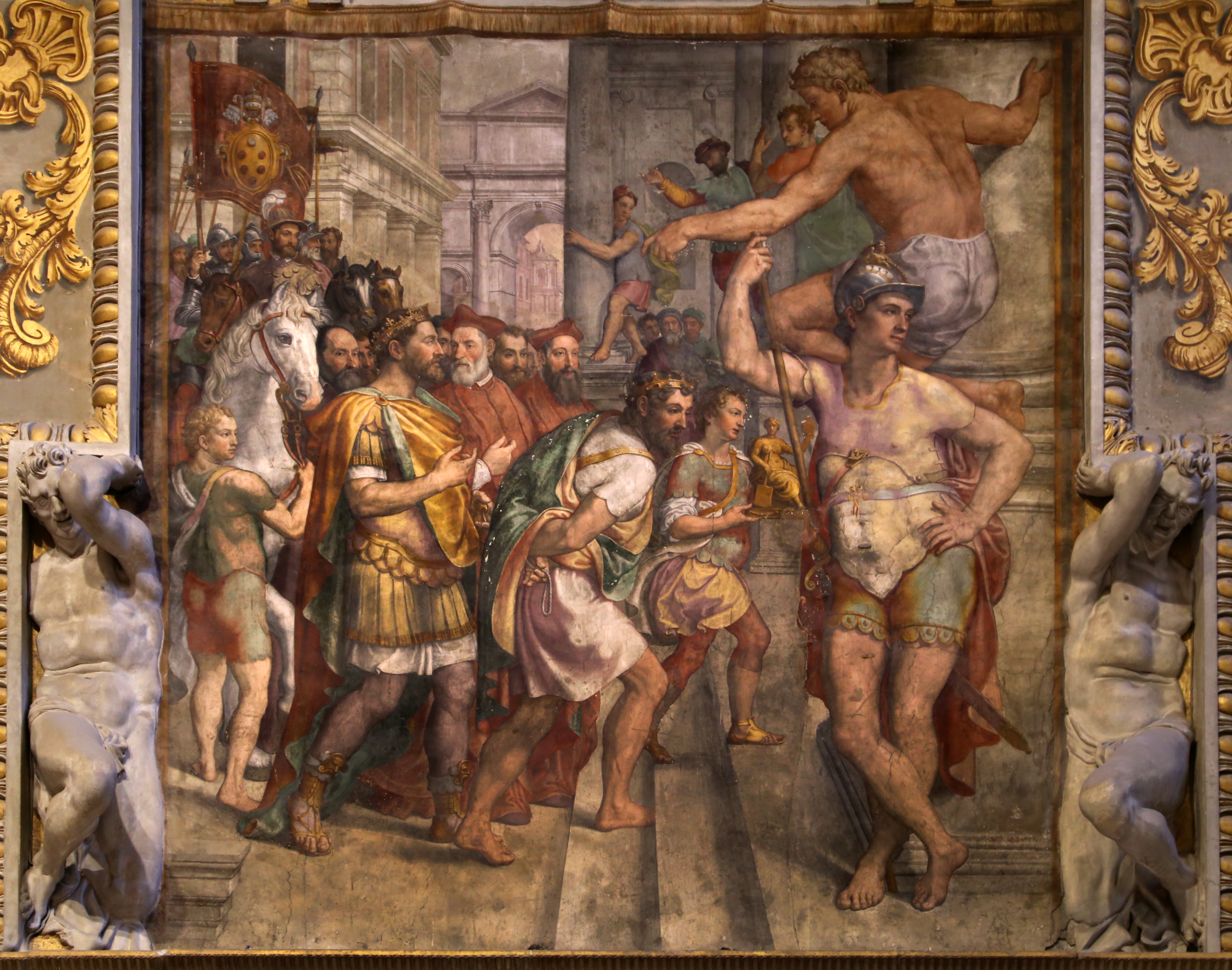
Fresco in the Sala Regia, Vatican, Pepin III gives Ravenna and the Pentapolis to Pope Stephen II (Girolamo Siciolante da Sermoneta, 1565–68)

Prior to Stephen II's alliance with Pepin, Rome had constituted the central city of the Duchy of Rome, which composed one of two districts within the Exarchate of Ravenna, along with Ravenna itself. At Quiercy the Frankish nobles finally gave their consent to a campaign in Lombardy. Catholic tradition asserts that then and there Pepin executed in writing a promise to give to the Church certain territories that were to be wrested from the Lombards, and which would be referred to later as the Papal States. Known as the Donation of Pepin, no actual document has been preserved, but later 8th-century sources quote from it.

Stephen anointed Pepin as king of the Franks at Saint-Denis in a memorable ceremony that was evoked in the coronation rites of French kings until the end of the ancien régime in 1789. In return, in 756, Pepin and his Frankish army forced the Lombard king to surrender his conquests, and Pepin officially conferred upon the pope the territories belonging to Ravenna, even cities such as Forlì with their hinterlands, laying the Donation of Pepin upon the tomb of Saint Peter, according to traditional later accounts. The gift included Lombard conquests in the Romagna and in the duchies of Spoleto and Benevento, and the Pentapolis in the Marche (the "five cities" of Rimini, Pesaro, Fano, Senigallia and Ancona). For the first time, the Donation made the pope a temporal ruler over a strip of territory that extended diagonally across Italy from the Tyrrhenian to the Adriatic. Over these extensive and mountainous territories the medieval popes were unable to exercise effective sovereignty, given the pressures of the times, and the new Papal States preserved the old Lombard heritage of many small counties and marquisates, each centered upon a fortified rocca.

Pepin confirmed his Donation in Rome in 756, and in 774, Charlemagne confirmed the donation of his father. Stephen II died on 26 April 757 (Note: Thomas Noble states Stephen was buried 26 April 757.) and was succeeded by his brother Paul I.

== See also ==
- Annales laureshamenses
- List of popes

== Sources ==
- Paolo Delogu: Stefano II. In: Massimo Bray (ed.): Enciclopedia dei Papi. Volume 1: Pietro, santo. Anastasio bibliotecario, antipapa. Istituto della Enciclopedia Italiana, Rome 2000, pp. 660–665 (treccani.it).
- Ekkart Sauser (1995). "Stephan II. (III.)". In Bautz, Traugott (ed.). Biographisch-Bibliographisches Kirchenlexikon (BBKL) (in German). Vol. 10. Herzberg: Bautz. cols. 1351–1354. ISBN 3-88309-062-X.
- Rudolf Schieffer (1997). "Stephan II". Lexikon des Mittelalters, VIII: Stadt (Byzantinisches Reich) bis Werl (in German). Stuttgart and Weimar: J. B. Metzler. col. 116–117. ISBN 3-89659-908-9.
- Noble, Thomas F. X. (1984). The Republic of St. Peter: The Birth of the Papal State, 680-825. University of Pennsylvania Press. ISBN 9780812200911.
- Riche, Pierre (1993). The Carolingians: A Family Who Forged Europe. Translated by Allen, Michael Idomir. University of Pennsylvania Press. ISBN 9780812213423.

Catholic Church titles
Preceded by Zachary	Pope; 752–757	Succeeded by Paul I
