= Pope Zachary =

Head of the Catholic Church from 741 to 752

Pope Saint Zachary
- Bishop of Rome
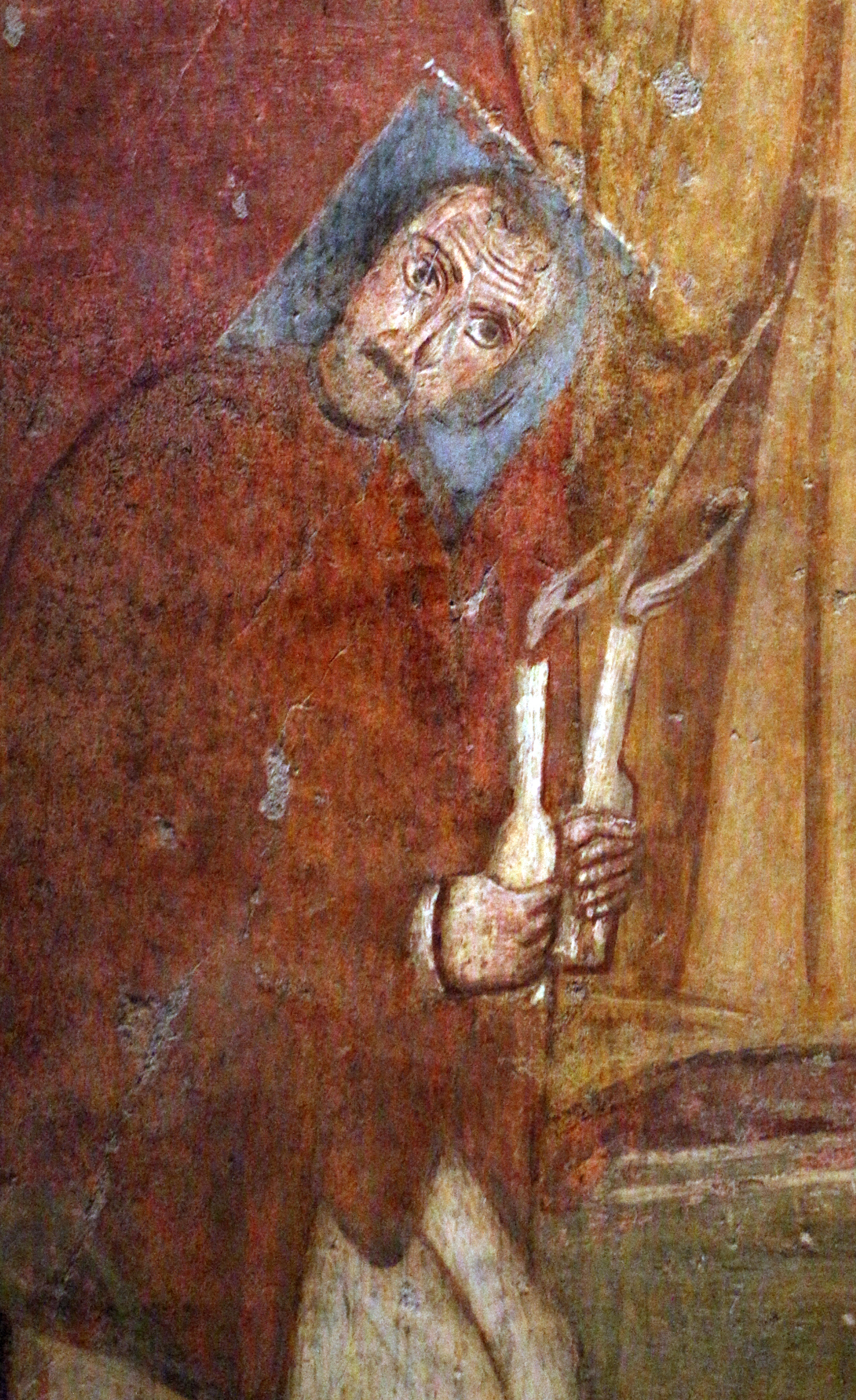
- Contemporary Byzantine fresco in Santa Maria Antiqua
- Church: Church of Rome
- Papacy began: 3 or 5 December 741
- Papacy ended: 15 March 752
- Predecessor: Gregory III
- Successor: Stephen II

Orders
- Consecration: 4 or 6 December 741
- Created cardinal: 12 April 732 by Gregory III

Personal details
- Born: 679 Santa Severina, Calabria, Eastern Roman Empire
- Died: 15 March 752 (aged 72–73) Rome, Duchy of Rome

Sainthood
- Feast day: 15 March
- Venerated in: Catholic Church; Eastern Orthodox Church

Pope Zachary (Latin: Zacharias; 679 – 15 March 752) was the bishop of Rome from 3 or 5 December 741 until his death on 15 March 752. He was the last pope of the Byzantine Papacy. Zachary built the original church of Santa Maria sopra Minerva, forbade the traffic of slaves in Rome, negotiated peace with the Lombards, and sanctioned Pepin the Short's usurpation of the Frankish throne from Childeric III. Zachary is regarded as a capable administrator and a skillful and subtle diplomat in a dangerous time.

== Early career ==
Zachary was born into a family of Greek origin, in the Calabrian town of Santa Severina. He was most probably a deacon of the Roman Church and as such signed the decrees of the Roman council of 732. He was selected to succeed Gregory III as pope on 3 December or 5 December 741.

== Pontificate ==
Gregory III's alliance with the Lombard Duchy of Spoleto put papal cities at risk when the dukes of Spoleto and Benevento rebelled. Zachary turned to King Liutprand the Lombard directly. Out of respect for Zachary the king restored to the church of Rome all the territory seized by the Lombards and sent back the captives without ransom. The contemporary history (Liber pontificalis) dwells chiefly on Zachary's personal influence with Liutprand, and with his successor Ratchis. At the request of the Exarchate of Ravenna, Zachary persuaded Liutprand to abandon a planned attack on Ravenna and to restore territory seized from the city.

Zachary corresponded with Archbishop Boniface of Mainz, counseling him about dealing with disreputable prelates such as Milo, bishop of Reims and Trier. "As for Milo and his like, who are doing great injury to the church of God, preach in season and out of season, according to the word of the Apostle, that they cease from their evil ways." At Boniface's request, Zachary confirmed three newly established bishoprics of Würzburg, Büraburg, and Erfurt. In 742 he appointed Boniface as papal legate to the Concilium Germanicum, hosted by Carloman, one of the Frankish mayors of the Palace. In a later letter Zachary confirmed the metropolitans appointed by Boniface to Rouen, Reims and Sens. In 745 Zachary convened a synod in Rome to discourage a tendency toward the worship of angels.

Zachary corresponded with temporal rulers as well. Answering a question from the Frankish Mayor of the Palace Pepin the Short, who planned to usurp the Frankish throne from the puppet-king Childeric III, Zachary rendered the opinion that it was better that he should be king who had the royal power than he who had not. Shortly thereafter, the Frankish nobles decided to abandon Childeric, the last Merovingian king, in favor of Pepin. Zachary remonstrated with the Byzantine emperor Constantine V on his iconoclastic policies.

Zachary built the original church of Santa Maria sopra Minerva over an ancient temple to Minerva near the Pantheon. He also restored the decaying Lateran Palace, moving the relic of the head of Saint George to the church of San Giorgio al Velabro. After Venetian merchants bought many slaves in Rome to sell to the Muslims of Africa, Zachary forbade such traffic and then paid the merchants their price, giving the slaves their freedom.

== Death and legacy ==
Pope Zachary died on 15 March 752 and was buried in St. Peter's Basilica. His elected successor, Stephen, died within days, and Zachary was finally succeeded by Stephen II. The letters and decrees of Zachary are published in Jacques Paul Migne, Patrolog. lat. lxxxix. p. 917–960.

Church historian Johann Peter Kirsch said of Zachary: "In a troubled era Zachary proved himself to be an excellent, capable, vigorous, and charitable successor of Peter." Peter Partner called Zachary a skilled diplomat, "perhaps the most subtle and able of all the Roman pontiffs, in this dark corridor in which the Roman See hovered just inside the doors of the Byzantine world."

Catholic Church titles
Preceded by Gregory III	Pope; 741–752	Succeeded by Stephen II
