= Pope Paul I =

Head of the Catholic Church from 757 to 767

Pope Saint Paul I
- Bishop of Rome
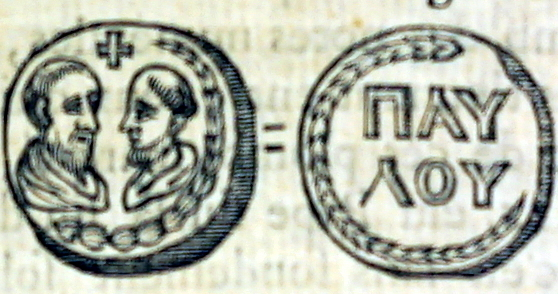
- Seal of Paul I, with Greek text ΠΑΥΛΟΥ (Paulou, "of Paul")
- Church: Catholic Church
- Papacy began: 29 May 757
- Papacy ended: 28 June 767
- Predecessor: Stephen II
- Successor: Stephen III

Personal details
- Born: 700 Rome, Italy, Eastern Roman Empire
- Died: 28 June 767 (aged 66–67) Rome, Papal States

Pope Paul I (Latin: Paulus I; 700 – 28 June 767) was the bishop of Rome and leader of the emerging Papal States from 29 May 757 to his death on 28 June 767. He first served as a Roman deacon and was frequently employed by his brother, Pope Stephen II, in negotiations with the Lombard kings.

== Rise ==
Paul was a Roman aristocrat and member of the Orsini family. He and his brother Stephen had been educated for the priesthood at the Lateran Palace. Stephen became pope in 752. After Stephen's death on 26 April 757, Paul prevailed over a faction that wanted to make Archdeacon Theophylact pope and was chosen to succeed his brother by the majority that wished a continuation of Stephen's policy.

== Pontificate ==
Paul I's reign was dominated by relations with the Frankish and Lombard kings and with the Eastern Roman emperor. He wrote to Pepin the Short that the Frankish alliance should be maintained unimpaired. Paul was likely concerned of the danger posed by the Lombard king Desiderius. The Lombards held the cities of Imola, Osimo, Bologna, and Ancona, which were claimed by the papacy, and in 758 seized upon the duchies of Spoleto and Benevento.

On his return from suppressing a revolt in Benevento, Desiderius visited Rome and compelled Paul to write to Pepin asking him to concede all the Lombard claims. He promised to return Imola, but on condition that the pope should persuade Pepin to send back Lombard hostages held by the Franks. Paul agreed and sent a letter to Pepin. Pepin found it advisable to maintain good relations with Desiderius, and Paul apparently accomplished little by his double-dealing. Later, however, Pepin gave the pope some support and acted as arbiter between the Roman and Lombard claims.

In 765, papal privileges were restored in the duchies of Benevento and Tuscany and partially in Spoleto. Meanwhile, the alienation from the Eastern Roman Empire grew greater. On several occasions, especially in 759, Paul feared that the emperor would send an army against Rome. This meant that he lived in constant dread of Eastern Roman ambitions turning the Frankish influence in favor of the Lombards. This was actually attempted, but Pepin held to his original policy regarding Italy.

Paul died in Rome on 28 June 767.

Catholic Church titles
Preceded by Stephen II	Pope; 757–767	Succeeded by Stephen III
