= Byzantine expedition to Calabria (788/789) =

In late 788 or early 789, the Byzantine Empire invaded southern Italy in an effort to detach the kingdom of the Lombards from the Frankish domination and restore the exiled king Adelchis. The expeditionary army, supported by the Sicilian theme, was defeated in a major battle by a combined force of Lombards and Franks under Duke Grimoald III of Benevento.

The cause of the war was the breakdown in 788 of the proposed marriage between the Emperor Constantine VI, still under the regency of his mother, Irene, and Rotrude, the daughter of the Frankish king Charlemagne. Following the war, relations between the two empires were not re-established until 797.

== Date ==
In the words of the Royal Frankish Annals, "there was war between the Greeks and the Lombards" in 788. Theophanes the Confessor places the conflict under the year 6281 of the Byzantine calendar, which began on 1 September 788 and ended 31 August 789. Scholars generally date the invasion to 788 in accordance with the Annals. According to Tibor Živković, the expedition probably took place no earlier than December 788, since the definitive rupture in Franco-Byzantine relations occurred in October 788 and Constantine VI's marriage to Maria of Amnia in November, and no later than the spring of 789. Warren Treadgold believes the expedition landed in Italy in November 788, timed "to come just after" Constantine's marriage. Judith Herrin places it in 789.

Byzantine and Frankish sources agree that the cause of the war was the canceling of the engagement between Charlemagne's daughter Rotrude and Constantine VI. They disagree on the initiative for the cancelation, with Theophanes crediting Irene and the Royal Annals Charlemagne. The historian Roger Collins accepts the Frankish account, which makes the Byzantine expedition into retaliation for Charlemagne cancelling the marriage alliance.

== Commanders and contingents ==
The Byzantine expeditionary force was under the command of the sakellarios John and the Lombard exile Adelchis. John was a eunuch who had commanded the army against the Abbasid invasion of Asia Minor in 781. Adelchis, called Theodotos by Theophanes, had been co-king of the Lombards with his father Desiderius prior to Charlemagne's conquest of the kingdom in 774. He continued to be recognised as the legitimate king by the Byzantine government. Had the expedition been successful, he would have been restored to rule in Italy under a Byzantine protectorate.

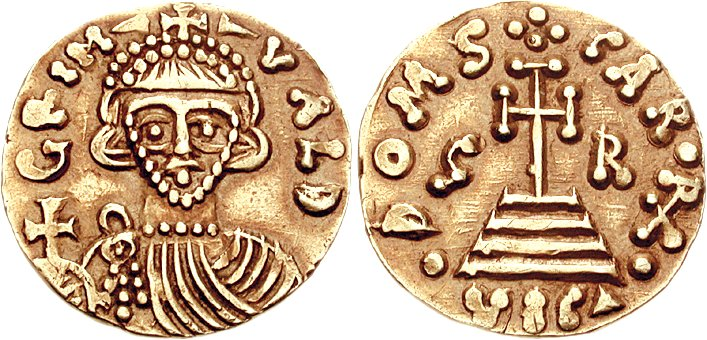
Traditional golden solidus of Benevento with Grimoald's effigy and Charlemagne's name (DOMS CAR RX = Lord King Charles)

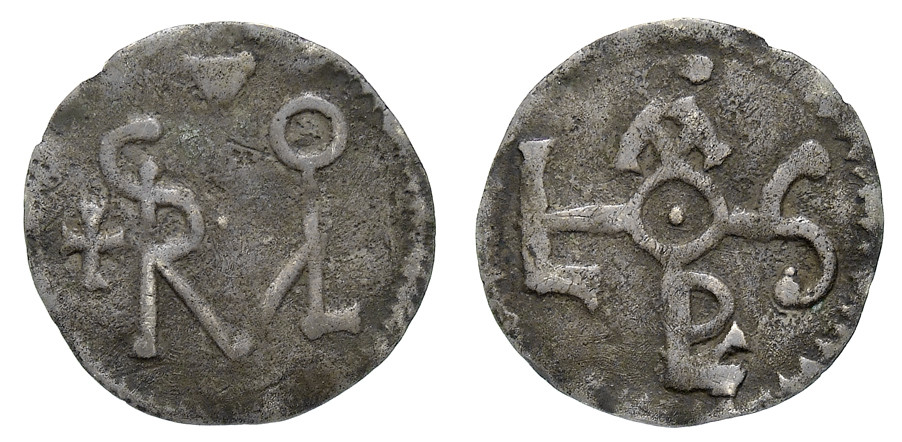
Silver denarius of Frankish type bearing the monograms of Grimoald and Charlemagne

Coins from the period of Grimoald III's submission to the Franks.

In the words of Theophanes, the purpose of the expedition was "to hold off Charles—if they could—and to detach some men from him." In addition to sending an expeditionary force, Irene ordered Theodore, the governor of Sicily, to provide support to the invasion. Theophanes says that Theodore was "with them" at the battle.

The Lombards were led by Duke Grimoald III of Benevento and Duke Hildeprand of Spoleto. A contingent of Franks under Winigis was sent, in the words of the Annals, "to oversee everything they [the Lombards] did". The Frankish force was probably small. The actual commander was Grimoald. He had been a hostage of Charlemagne for the good behaviour of his father, Arechis II. His elder brother Romuald and his father died suddenly within weeks of each other in 788. Charlemagne released Grimoald on the promise that Frankish overlordship would be recognized in Benevento, including on charters and coins.

== Battle and aftermath ==
The Byzantines landed in Calabria and marched towards the border with the Duchy of Benevento. The main battle took place in Calabria, near the frontier. The Annals credits victory to the Franks and Lombards. Theophanes describes John as the commander "defeated by the Franks". He was captured in battle and "put to a cruel death". In a letter dated 790, Alcuin of York, Charlemagne's confidant, wrote to Colcu of Clonmacnoise that the Byzantines "fled to their ships" after their defeat, having lost 4,000 men killed and 1,000 captured. A substantial booty was also recovered. The ultimate fate of Adelchis is unknown. He disappears from the historical record after his defeat.

Following the battle, there is no recorded diplomatic contact between the two powers until Constantine VI sent the strategos of Sicily, Niketas, on an embassy to Aachen in 797. It probably dealt with the release of prisoners. One of these captives, not released at that time, was Sisinnios, elder brother of Patriarch Tarasios of Constantinople. According the Annals, in 798, after Constantine's death, Irene negotiated his release.

== Bibliography ==
- Borri, Francesco (2021a). "Troubled Times: Narrating Conquest and Defiance between Charlemagne and Bernard (774–818)". In Christopher Heath; Robert Houghton (eds.). Conflict and Violence in Medieval Italy, 568–1154. Amsterdam University Press. pp. 117–147.
- Borri, Francesco (2021b). "The Duke of Istria, the Roman Past and the Frankish Present". In Thomas J. MacMaster; Nicholas S. M. Matheou (eds.). Italy and the East Roman World in the Medieval Mediterranean Empire: Cities and Elites, 476–1204. Routledge. pp. 234–244.
- Brown, Thomas S. (2019). "Byzantine Italy (680–876)". In Jonathan Shepard (ed.). The Cambridge History of the Byzantine Empire, c. 500–1492. Cambridge University Press. pp. 433–464.
- Brubaker, Leslie; Haldon, John F. (2011). Byzantium in the Iconoclast Era, c. 680–850: A History. Cambridge University Press.
- Collins, Roger (1998). Charlemagne. Macmillan.
- Efthymiadis, Stephanos, ed. (2016) [1998]. The Life of the Patriarch Tarasios by Ignatios Deacon (BHG1698): Introduction, Edition, Translation and Commentary. Routledge.
- Fabbro, Eduard (2021). "Constructing the Enemy: Byzantium in Paul the Deacon". In Thomas J. MacMaster; Nicholas S. M. Matheou (eds.). Italy and the East Roman World in the Medieval Mediterranean Empire: Cities and Elites, 476–1204. Routledge. pp. 70–94.
- Falkenhausen, Vera von (1978). La dominazione bizantina nell'Italia meridionale dal IX all'XI secolo. Ecumenica Editrice.
- Gay, Jules (1904). L'Italie meridionale et l'empire byzantin depuis l'avènement de Basile I^{er} jusqu'à la prise de Bari par les Normands (867–1071). Albert Fontemoing.
- Grierson, Philip; Blackburn, Mark (1986). Medieval European Coinage. Vol. 1: The Early Middle Ages (5th–10th Centuries). Cambridge University Press.
- Hägermann, Dieter (2011) [2000]. Carlo Magno: Il signore dell'Occidente. Translated by Giuseppe Albertoni. Arnoldo Mondadori Editore.
- Herrin, Judith (2001). Women in Purple: Rulers of Medieval Byzantium. Princeton University Press.
- Hodgkin, Thomas (1967) [1889]. Italy and Her Invaders. Vol. VIII, Book IX. The Frankish Empire, 774–814. Russell & Russell.
- King, P. D. (1986). Charlemagne. Methuen.
- Kreutz, Barbara (1991). Before the Normans: Southern Italy in the Ninth and Tenth Centuries. University of Pennsylvania Press.
- Marazzi, Federico (2021). "Byzantines and Lombards". In Salvatore Cosentino (ed.). A Companion to Byzantine Italy. Brill. pp. 169–199.
- Minois, Georges (2014). Charlemagne. Perrin.
- Nelson, Janet L. (2019). King and Emperor: A New Life of Charlemagne. Penguin.
- Noble, Thomas F. X. (1984). The Republic of St. Peter: The Birth of the Papal State, 680–825. University of Pennsylvania Press.
- Noyé, Ghislaine (2021). "Byzantine Calabria". In Salvatore Cosentino (ed.). A Companion to Byzantine Italy. Brill. pp. 434–452.
- Poupardin, René (1907). Études sur l'histoire des principautés lombardes de l'Italie méridionale et de leurs rapports avec l'empire Franc. Honoré Champion.
- Scholz, Bernhard Walter, ed. (1970). Carolingian Chronicles: Royal Frankish Annals and Nithard's Histories. University of Michigan Press.
- Treadgold, Warren (1988). The Byzantine Revival, 780–842. Stanford University Press.
- Turtledove, Harry (1982). The Chronicle of Theophanes: An English Translation of Anni Mundi 6095–6305 (A.D. 602–813). University of Pennsylvania Press.
- West, G. V. B. (2003). "Charlemagne's Involvement in Central and Southern Italy: Power and the Limits of Authority". Early Medieval Europe. 8 (3): 341–367. doi:10.1111/1468-0254.00052.
- Wickham, Chris (1981). Early Medieval Italy: Central Power and Local Society, 400–1000. Macmillan.
- Živković, Tibor (1999). "The Date of the Creation of the Theme of Peloponnese". Byzantina Symmeikta. 13: 141–155. doi:10.12681/byzsym.863.
