= Hildeprand of Spoleto =

Italian noble

Hildeprand was duke of Spoleto from 774 to 788, during the period following the collapse of the Lombard kingdom under Charlemagne. His rule took place during the transition from Lombard to Frankish power in Italy. He married Regarde, daughter of Gotfrid.

== Background ==
Before 774, relations between the duchy of Spoleto and the papacy had evolved significantly. Although earlier the duchy had often been in conflict with Rome, a reversal of alliances occurred beginning with the reign of Liutprand. Rome became an ally and protector of Spoleto against Lombard royal authority. This relationship was demonstrated when Duke Transamund took refuge in Rome in 739 after being removed from power. Under Pope Gregory III, the papacy took a sustained interest in the duchy as part of its political strategy against the Lombard kings. During the reign of Duke Alboin, Rome again acted as protector of the duchy and guarantor of its autonomy, establishing a precedent for later intervention.

== Election ==
Hildeprand came to power in 774 during the final phase of the Lombard kingdom. At that time, King Desiderius had withdrawn to Pavia to face the advancing Frankish forces of Charlemagne, while other Lombard forces were dispersed. In this situation, groups from the duchy of Spoleto, including inhabitants of Spoleto and Rieti, sought refuge in Rome. They placed themselves under the protection of Pope Adrian I and swore an oath of fidelity to the pope. As part of this act of submission, they adopted Roman customs, including the cutting of their hair in Roman fashion.

After this oath, Hildeprand was chosen as duke by the Spoleto group that had taken refuge in Rome. He was described as nobilissimus, indicating his membership in the elite of the duchy. Pope Adrian I recognized him as duke following this election. The available information does not provide details about Hildeprand’s origins or earlier roles within the duchy. His rise to power is associated with a faction opposed to the previous duke, Theodicius, who had been installed under Lombard royal authority and is attested as still in office in September 773 in material preserved at Farfa Abbey. Theodicius likely remained loyal to King Desiderius and did not participate in the shift toward Rome.

The installation of Hildeprand reflects a transfer of authority in the duchy from Lombard royal control to papal influence. Although the duke was chosen by the Spoleto group, papal recognition became necessary for the establishment of his authority. This arrangement marked a shift from dependence on the Lombard king to dependence on the papacy.

== Subordination to the papacy ==
Following his election, Hildeprand initially operated under papal authority. This situation is reflected in two documents: a ducal precept and a donation charter to the monastery of Farfa. In both cases, the dating formula refers to Pope Adrian I rather than to a Lombard king. This represents a departure from earlier practice, where documents were dated according to the regnal years of Lombard rulers. The absence of papal regnal years in these formulas makes precise dating difficult, but the documents are placed between October 773 and December 775.

This phase of papal control over the duchy appears to have been brief. Diplomatic evidence indicates that it lasted no more than about two years. During this period, the duchy was effectively under the authority of Rome, following the oath of fidelity sworn in 774.

== Shift toward Frankish allegiance ==
In 775, Charlemagne sent two envoys, Rabigaudus and Possessor, to Spoleto and Benevento. These envoys did not pass through Rome, and Pope Adrian I complained that he had been excluded from their mission. Their purpose was to secure the loyalty of the southern duchies and prevent conflict in Italy while Charlemagne was engaged elsewhere.

Hildeprand began to distance himself from papal authority during this period. By late 775, tensions between the duke and the pope had increased. The envoys later appeared before the pope and requested that he grant pardon to Hildeprand, indicating that the duke had acted in opposition to papal expectations. The pope agreed to this request, although reluctantly.

In February 776, Pope Adrian I accused Hildeprand of involvement in a conspiracy with Arichis of Benevento, Hrodgaud of Friuli, and Regibald of Chiusi. According to this accusation, the group planned coordinated military action with Greek forces and Adalgis, son of Desiderius, aiming to attack Rome and restore Lombard rule. Although Hildeprand was likely aware of the planned revolt, subsequent events show that he did not participate in the uprising when it occurred in March 776. The rebellion was suppressed without involvement from Spoleto or Benevento.

By January 776, documents issued in the duchy of Spoleto began to use the name of Charlemagne instead of that of the pope in their dating formulas. This change marks the formal shift of the duchy into the Frankish sphere. Hildeprand’s alignment with Charlemagne was established through negotiations with the royal envoys.

== Rule under Frankish authority ==
After 776, Hildeprand governed the duchy as a supporter of Charlemagne. Diplomatic documents consistently include the name of the Frankish king, and dates are given according to his regnal years in Italy. Despite this change, the internal administration of the duchy remained largely unchanged. Hildeprand continued to hold assemblies, appoint officials, and manage public resources.

Hildeprand’s position within the Frankish system is illustrated by his meeting with Charlemagne in 779 at Verzenay. On this occasion, he presented gifts and was received favorably by the king, who confirmed him in his duchy. This event reinforced his alignment with Frankish authority.

The duchy’s relationship with the papacy remained tense. In April 781, during a visit by Charlemagne to Rome, the king agreed to restore to the Church certain territories in the Sabina, referred to as the patrimonium Savinense. This territory lay partly within the duchy of Spoleto, and its transfer reduced ducal control. The boundary between papal territory and the duchy was fixed along the Tiber between Rome and Narni, with Rieti marking the limit of the duchy.

== Conflict involving San Vincenzo al Volturno ==
An episode involving the monastery of San Vincenzo al Volturno illustrates tensions between Hildeprand and the papacy. In October 777, Autpert Ambrose, a Frank, became abbot of the monastery. He was later deposed at the end of 778 and took refuge with Hildeprand in Spoleto. His successor, Pothon, was accused of treason before Charlemagne but was later supported by Pope Adrian I, who ruled in his favor after an appeal.

The proceedings involved multiple figures, including the monk Rodicausus, who accused Pothon, and other monks who testified against him. Hildeprand supported the accusers, who had taken refuge in Spoleto. Despite this, the papal judgment favored Pothon and the monastic community. The case reflects broader tensions within the monastery between supporters of Frankish and Lombard positions, as well as the ongoing rivalry between papal and ducal authority.

== Opposition within the duchy ==
Evidence from charters indicates that Hildeprand’s pro-Frankish policy was not universally accepted within the duchy. A document dated 782 records that lands belonging to a man named Agemundus were confiscated because of his infidelitas. These lands were then granted to the monastery of Monte Cassino. The context suggests that this action may have been connected to opposition to the duke’s alignment with the Franks.

== Political identity and titulature ==
Hildeprand’s rule is associated with changes in ducal titulature. In documents issued after 776, he adopted the title gloriosissimus et summus dux ducatus Spoletani, introducing an explicit reference to the territory of the duchy. The new titulature reflects broader changes in political identity following the fall of the Lombard kingdom. The traditional association with the gens Langobardorum became less central, and the duchy increasingly defined itself in relation to its territory. This development contrasts with Benevento under Arichis, where Lombard identity remained a central element of political ideology.

== Later years ==
Hildeprand remained duke of Spoleto until 788, after which he is no longer attested.

== Sources ==
- Hodgkin, Thomas. Italy and her Invaders. Clarendon Press: 1895.

Regnal titles
Preceded by Theodicius	Duke of Spoleto; 774–789	Succeeded by Winiges
