= Adalgis =

Lombard prince

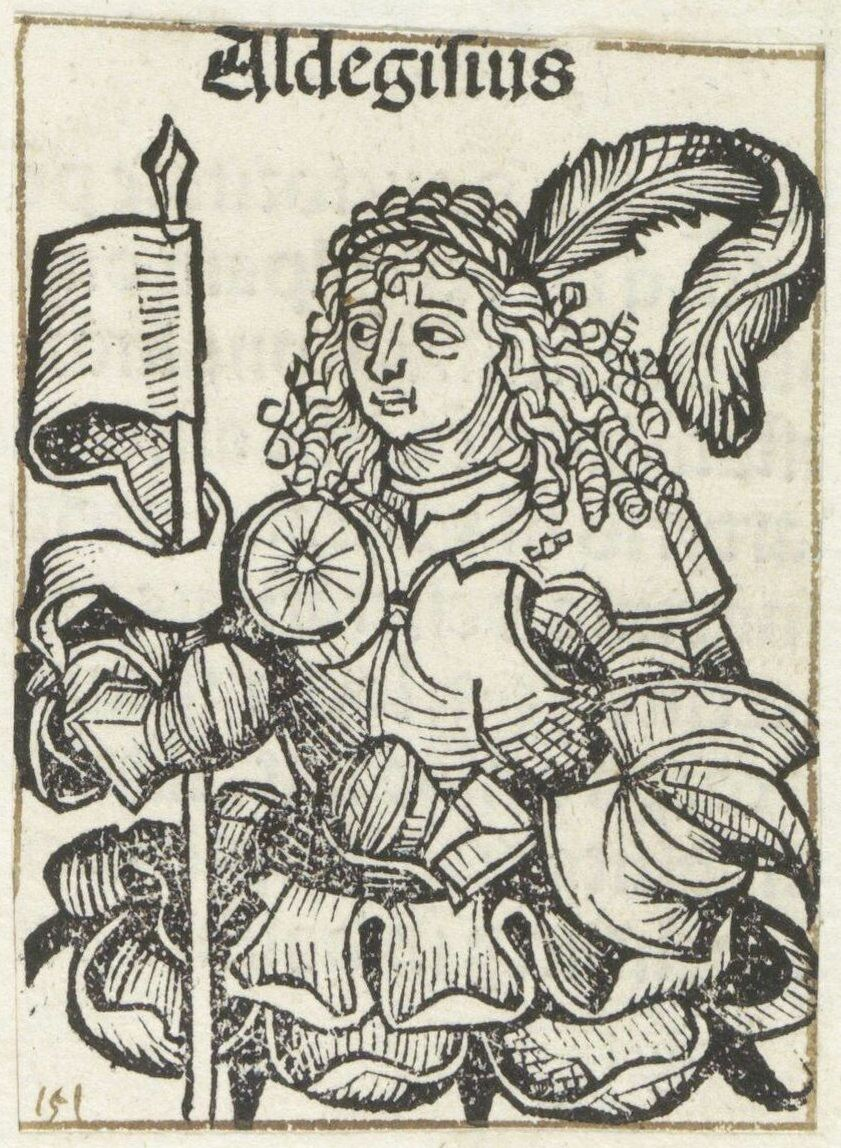
- An illustration of Adalgis from the Nuremberg Chronicle

King of the Lombards
- Reign: August 759 – June 774
- Predecessor: Desiderius
- Successor: Charlemagne
- Born: c. 740
- Died: 788
- House: Lombardy
- Father: Desiderius

Adalgis or Adelchis (c. 740 – 788) was an associate king of the Lombards from August 759, reigning with his father, Desiderius, until their deposition in June 774. He is also remembered today as the hero of the play Adelchi (1822) by Alessandro Manzoni.

== Biography ==
Adalgis was the son of Desiderius and his wife Ansa. He was associated with his father in the kingship in August 759. In Desiderius' attempts to rekindle an alliance between the Lombards and Carolingians he proposed that Adalgis should marry Charlemagne's sister Gisela. Bachrach has suggested that this proposal was to undermine the Carolingian's relationship with the papacy.

When in 773 the Lombard kingdom was invaded by Charlemagne, the king of the Franks, Desiderius stayed in Pavia, the capital, where he unsuccessfully resisted a siege. Adalgis instead took refuge in Verona, where he sheltered the widow and children of Charlemagne's younger brother, Carloman I, who had entered an Italian monastery after abdicating the kingship. Even before the fall of Pavia, when the Frankish army approached Verona, Adalgis did not resist. He escaped to Constantinople, where he was received by the Eastern Roman emperor Constantine V, who raised him to the patriciate.

Adalgis hoped to return to re-conquer Italy, and solicited help from Duke Arechis II of Benevento for this purpose. Many Lombards refused to submit to Frankish rule, believing that Adalgis's return was imminent. The historian Paul the Deacon reflected a widespread belief among the Lombards when he wrote, as part of his poetic epigraph for the tomb of Ansa, that "in her, by Christ, the greatest hope of the Lombards spent a time." Einhard, Charlemagne's biographer, also records that "on [Adalgis] everybody's hope seemed to incline" (in quem spes omnium inclinatae videbantur).

Only in 787, after the efforts of the Empress Irene to obtain the hand in marriage of Charlemagne's daughter Rotrude for her son, Constantine VI, did the Romans move to give Adalgis the military assistance he required. An expeditionary corps was placed under the command of the saccellarius and logotheta Ioannes and augmented by troops from Sicily under the patrikios Theodoros. The Roman army landed in Calabria towards the end of 788, but was met by the united armies of the Lombard dukes Hildeprand of Spoleto and Grimoald III of Benevento, who had succeeded his father, Arechis, and made peace with the Franks. These Lombard forces were accompanied by Frankish troops under Winiges. In the ensuing battle the Romans were defeated, but there is no further record of the fate of Adalgis.

== Notes ==
=== Works cited ===
- Bertolini, Ottorino (1960). "ADELCHI, re dei Longobardi". Dizionario Biografico degli Italiani (in Italian). Vol. 1: Aaron–Albertucci. Rome: Istituto dell'Enciclopedia Italiana. OCLC 883370.

Regnal titles
Preceded by Desiderius	King of the Lombards; 759–774	Succeeded by Charlemagne
