= Adelberger =

8th-century physician

- Years active: fl. 760
- Father: Desiderius

Adelberger of Lombardy (fl. 760) was among several lay medical women who were taught by the historian Paul of Lombardy (720–800), a Benedictine monk from Como. Adelberger was the daughter of Desiderius (ruled 756–774). Very little information about Adelberger survives today.

== Legacy ==
Adelberger is a featured figure on Judy Chicago's installation piece The Dinner Party as one of the 999 names on the Heritage Floor.
