= Grimoald III of Benevento =

8th-century Italian prince

Grimoald III
- Prince of Benevento
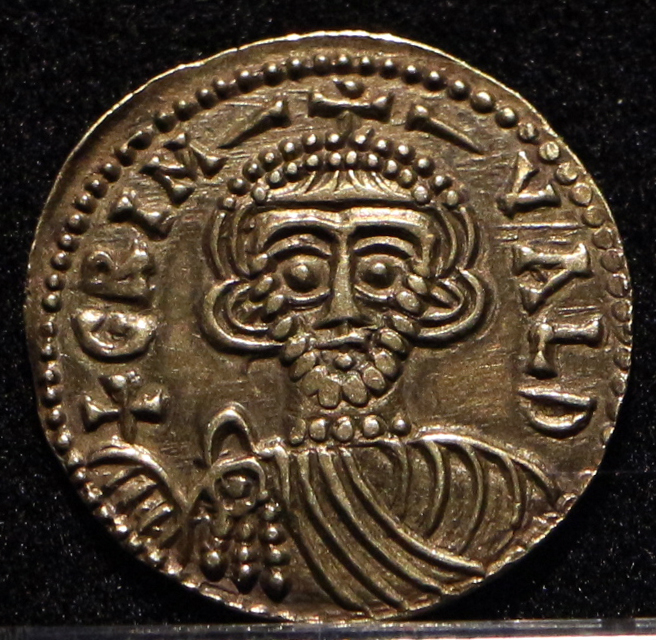
- Solidus of Grimoald III, made after 792
- Reign: 788 – 806
- Predecessor: Arechis II
- Successor: Grimoald IV
- Born: c. 760; Benevento, Duchy of Benevento
- Died: 806 (aged 45–46); Southern Italy, probably Benevento
- Father: Arechis II of Benevento
- Mother: Adelperga

Grimoald III (c. 760 – 806) was the Lombard Prince of Benevento from 788 until his own death. He was the second son of Arechis II and Adelperga. In 787, he and his elder brother Romoald were sent as hostages to Charlemagne who had descended the Italian peninsula as far as Salerno to receive the submission of Benevento. In return for peace, Arechis recognised Charlemagne's suzerainty and handed Grimoald over as a hostage.

When his father and brother both died in 787, Grimoald was allowed to return to Italy. He recognised Frankish overlordship, but was permitted practical independence in return for defending Italy from the Eastern Romans. In 788 he faced a Roman invasion commanded by Adelchis, the son of the last Lombard king, Desiderius. A Frankish army under Winigis and Hildebrand, Duke of Spoleto, joined Grimoald and defeated Adelchis on the coast soon after his landing.

Later, Grimoald tried to throw off Frankish suzerainty, but Charlemagne's sons, Pepin of Italy and Charles the Younger, forced him to submit in 792.

== Sources ==
- Gwatkin, H. M., Whitney, J. P. (edd.) The Cambridge Medieval History: Volume II—The Rise of the Saracens and the Foundations of the Western Empire. Cambridge: Cambridge University Press, 1926.
- Oman, Charles. The Dark Ages 476-918. London: Rivingtons, 1914.
- Hodgkin, Thomas. Italy and her Invaders. Oxford: Clarendon Press, 1895.
- McKitterick, Rosamond. The Frankish Kingdoms under the Carolingians, 751–987. London: Longman, 1983. ISBN 0-582-49005-7.
