= Valle Trita =

Region in Italy

The Valle Trita was a remote area lying beneath the highest peak in the Central Apennines. It was mainly forest and pastureland, classified as a gualdus during the Lombard period. It is famous for the long dispute between its inhabitants and the monastery of San Vincenzo al Volturno in the early Middle Ages.

The Valle Trita belonged to the royal fisc until about 758, when King Desiderius granted it to San Vincenzo about 100 kilometres away. The monastery began collecting as rents the dues (or taxes) formerly owed to the crown. The monks built up an estate in the valley and claimed that the peasants were slaves who did not own the land but owed service to the monastery for their right to it. The peasants claimed that they were free, and could produce precepts (precepta) of the Dukes of Spoleto, the highest local Lombard official, to that effect.

In 779, after the Carolingians had replaced the Lombards, the monastery brought the peasants to court to enforce their obedience. It won, but the peasants did not accept the verdict. In 787, Abbot Paul brought a petition to King Charlemagne, who confirmed Desiderius' grant of Trita to the monastery. The peasants were taken to court again that year and in 822, 823, 824, 854, 872 and 873: a total of eight court cases for which records survive in the cartulary of the monastery. The records also indicate a ninth court challenge, for which the proceedings have not survived, took place. San Vincenzo won every trial, but was unable to consistently enforce the rulings in the remote area. After the 854 ruling it had some success in forcing corvée from the peasants, who worked twelve weeks a year for the monastery. In January 873, when the peasants refused to attend court, the army of the Emperor Louis II, which was in the area, rounded them up and brought them to trial. The cold weather had prevented the peasants from taking to higher ground.

In 881 San Vincenzo was sacked by Muslim raiders and lost control over most of its estates for decades. The Valle Trita is not recorded again in the monastic cartulary until 998. Chris Wickham concludes that in all of Europe only at Trita did peasants successfully resist intrusive lordship for a long period before 900. Nevertheless, the peasant resistance of Trita may be only the best chronicled of many cases of remote pastoral communities with a history of independence resisting feudalisation in central Italy. More rare, but better recorded were the wide-ranging and violent revolts of the lower classes, such as the contemporary Saxon Stellinga in 841–42.

== Sources ==
- Albertoni, Giuseppe (2010). "Law and the Peasant: Rural Society and Justice in Carolingian Italy". Early Medieval Europe. 18 (4): 417–45. doi:10.1111/j.1468-0254.2010.00305.x.
- Balzaretti, Ross (1999). "Review Article: San Vincenzo al Volturno. History Rewritten?". Early Medieval Europe. 8 (3): 387–99. doi:10.1111/1468-0254.00054.
- Wickham, Chris (1981). Early Medieval Italy: Central Power and Local Society, 400–1000. London: Macmillan.
- Wickham, Chris (1982). Studi sulla società degli Appennini nell'alto Medioevo: contadini, signori e insediamento nel territorio di Valva (Sulmona). Bologna: Editrice CLUEB.
- Wickham, Chris (2005). Framing the Early Middle Ages: Europe and the Mediterranean, 400–800. Oxford: Oxford University Press.
