= Adelperga =

8th-century Lombard noblewoman

- Born: c. 740
- Died: after 787
- Spouse: Arechis II of Benevento
- Children: Grimoald III of Benevento
- Parents: Desiderius, King of the Lombards; Ansa, Queen of the Lombards

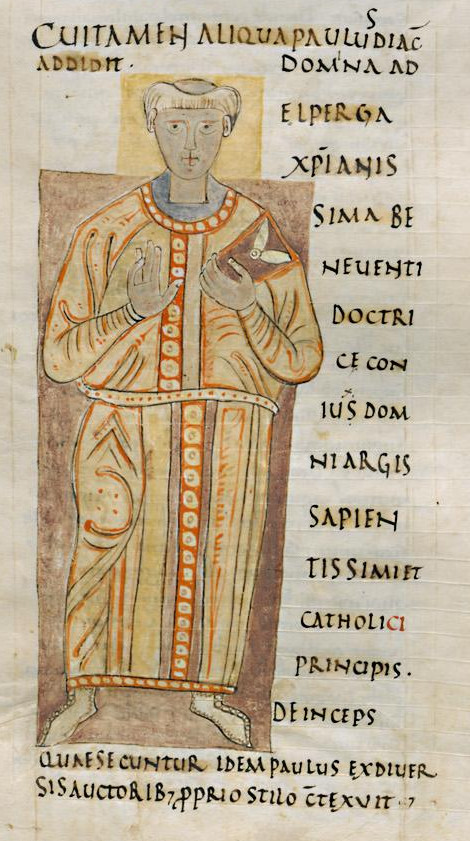
Beginning of Paul the Deacon's continuation of Eutropius (Laurentian Library Plut. 65.35 fol. 34r, 10th century). The text mentions Domina Adelperga Christianissima Beneventi Doctrice coniux Domini Argis Sapieneissimi et Catholici Principis

Adelperga (born c. 740 – died after 787) was a Lombard noblewoman, Duchess of Benevento by marriage to Arechis II of Benevento. She acted as regent of Benevento for her son Grimoald in 787-788. She was the third of four daughters of Desiderius, King of the Lombards, and his wife Ansa. Her elder sister Desiderata was a wife of Charlemagne.

== Early life ==
She was the third of four daughters of Desiderius, King of the Lombards, and his wife Ansa. Adelperga was tutored by Paul the Deacon.

== Duchess ==
About 757, she married Arechis II, Duke of Benevento. She remained in contact with Paulus, who, at her request, wrote his continuation of Eutropius about 775. Paul dedicated to her his Versus de Annis, including an acrostic spelling Adelperga pia.

Adelperga and Arechis had five children, Romuald (761/2–787), Grimoald (before 773 – April 806), Gisulf (d. before 806), Theoderada (d. after 787) and Adelchisa (b. after 773, d. after 817), abbess of San Salvatore d'Alife.

=== Conflict with Charlemagne ===
After the fall of the Kingdom of the Lombards to Charlemagne, Adelperga's parents and sister were exiled to Francia, where they were imprisoned in religious houses.

Adelperga and her sister Liutperga embarked upon a struggle to regain their patrimony and take revenge upon Charlemagne. Liutperga ultimately brought ruin upon herself and her family by encouraging her husband Tassilo to rebel against his cousin Charlemagne. Charlemagne discovered Tassilo's plots and confiscated his goods. Tassilo, Liutperga, and their children were banished to monasteries.

Adelperga was more successful; her husband resisted Charlemagne for some time, until in 787 he agreed to make peace. At the encouragement of his wife and the Byzantines, he refused the peace treaty, which would have entailed surrendering part of his duchy to the Papacy.

Adelperga and Arechis sponsored the church of Santa Sofia in Benevento.

== Regency ==
When Arechis died on 26 August 787, Adelperga acted as regent because Charlemagne hesitated to release Adelperga's son Grimoald, whom he kept as a hostage. Grimoald was released and acceded as duke in February 787. He arrived in Benevento in 788, thus discontinuing Adalperga's regency.

Grimoald swore fealty to Charlemagne and defeated a Byzantine invasion commanded by Adelchis. After this, Adelperga is not mentioned again.
