= Anselperga =

Italian Abbess

Anselperga (fl. 772), was an Italian abbess. She was the eldest daughter of Desiderius, King of the Lombards, and Ansa. She was the second Abbess of San Salvatore e Santa Giulia, which her parents had formed in Brescia from the union of San Michele e San Pietro with San Salvatore e Santa Maria.

Anselperga was richly endowed with land. She received donations from her father, mother, brother Adelchis, and her maternal relatives. During her tenure San Salvatore was removed by her father from the jurisdiction of the Patriarch of Aquileia and given to the Archbishop of Milan. Nevertheless, on 13 October 772, Anselperga received a privilege from Patriarch Siguald. The date of Anselperga's death is unrecorded, but she was replaced by Radoara as early as 781.

== Sources ==
- Ghisalberti, A. M., ed. Dizionario Biografico degli Italiani: III Ammirato – Arcoleo. Rome, 1961.
- Murray, A. C., and Goffart, W. A., edd. After Rome's Fall: Narrators and Sources of Early Medieval History. Toronto: University of Toronto Press, 1998.
