= Gerberga, wife of Carloman I =

Wife of Carloman I

Gerberga, wife of Carloman, King of Austrasia

Gerberga (8th century) was the wife of Carloman I, King of the Franks, and sister-in-law of Charlemagne. Her flight to the Lombard kingdom of Desiderius following Carloman's death precipitated the last Franco-Lombard war, and the end of the independent kingdom of the Lombards in 774.

Very little is known of Gerberga. Her family and background are otherwise unknown: references to her being a daughter of Desiderius appear to be based upon confusion between herself and her sister-in-law, the Lombard princess Desiderata, who had married Carloman's brother, Charlemagne, as part of a pact between the Franks and the Lombards. That she in fact was a Frank is attested by Pope Stephen III: when the Pope, hearing of the marriage between Desiderata and Charlemagne, wrote a scolding letter to Carloman and Charlemagne, he claimed to the pair that "by your father's [i.e. Pepin the Short] explicit order, you were united in marriage to beautiful Frankish women..."

Gerberga bore her husband Carloman two sons, the elder of whom was named Pippin, during their marriage. After Carloman died (of a severe nosebleed, according to one source), Gerberga expected her sons to inherit Carloman's realm, and perhaps intended to rule as regent; instead, Charlemagne seized his brother's territory, and Gerberga fled Francia with her sons and Carloman's chief advisor, Autchar. Charlemagne's biographer, Einhard, claimed she fled "for no reason at all".

In Lombardy, Gerberga and her companions were given refuge by King Desiderius at Pavia. Desiderius and Carloman had been enemies during the latter's reign, due to the alliance between Desiderius and Charlemagne, with whom Carloman had lived in a state of hostility. Desiderius, however, had been alienated from Charlemagne by the latter's repudiation of Desiderius' daughter, Desiderata, shortly before, and now moved in support of Carloman's family. He made overtures to Pope Hadrian I, requesting that he crown Carloman's sons as Kings of the Franks, and acknowledge their right to succeed their father.

In 773, Charlemagne invaded Italy, intending to end the threat that Desiderius and Gerberga posed towards him. Desiderius was besieged at Pavia, the Lombard capital; Gerberga took refuge with her sons, Desiderius' son Adalgis, and Autchar, in Verona, the strongest of the Lombard cities. Pavia would fall in June 774; Verona had already been taken before that, the citizens being unwilling to give a protracted resistance to the Frankish army, and Gerberga, her children, and Autchar were brought before Charlemagne.

Their fate thereafter is unknown, since there is no further reference to them in Frankish or Papal histories. Some historians consider it likely that Gerberga and her sons (the latter having been tonsured) were sent to religious houses, as was the fate of Desiderius and his family. Others consider Charlemagne's exhortations to his own sons in the Divisio Regni, where he orders that none of his sons should harm their sons or nephews, and suggest that he might have had in mind his own treatment of his nephews.

== Children ==
- Pepin, Prince of the Franks (bef. 769)
- unknown son (ca. 770)
- Kunigunde or Auberge

Preceded by Bertrada of Laon	Queen of the Franks c. 768–771 with Desiderata (768–771)	Succeeded by Hildegarde
