= Autpert Ambrose =

Frankish Benedictine monk

Saint Autpert Ambrose

Abbot of San Vincenzo al Volturno
- Born: c. 730; Likely in Provence
- Died: 784; Italy
- Venerated in: Catholic Church; Eastern Orthodox Church
- Feast: 19 July

Autpert Ambrose (Ambroise) (Latin: Ambrosius Autpertus) (ca. 730 – 784) was a Frankish Benedictine monk. An abbot of San Vincenzo al Volturno in South Italy in the time of Desiderius, king of the Lombards, Autpert wrote a considerable number of works on the Bible and religious subjects generally. Among these are commentaries on the Apocalypse, on the Psalms, and on the Song of Songs; a life of the founders of the monastery of San Vincenzo (Latin: Vita Paldonis, Tasonis et Tatonis); and a Conflictus vitiorum et virtutum (Combat between the Virtues and the Vices). Jean Mabillon calls him "sanctissimus" because of his great virtue and the Bollandists gave him the title "saint". His cultus has been approved.

== Biography ==
Autpert Ambrose was born in Gaul, probably Provence, at the beginning of the eighth century. He moved to Italy and entered the Benedictine monastery of San Vincenzo al Volturno, near Benevento, in Southern Italy, where he received his intellectual and spiritual formation and was ordained a priest sometime before 761. He became abbot on 4 October 777. In 774 Charlemagne had defeated the Lombards, but had not subjugated the Duchy of Benevento: Autpert's election aggravated the disputes between French and Lombard monks, and on 28 December 778 he was forced to leave the monastery to the Lombard Poto and flee to Spoleto. Summoned to Rome by Charlemagne to resolve the conflict, he died on the way, perhaps murdered, in 784. Information about his life is available primarily from the fragmentary Chronicon Vulturnense written by a monk named John, and from brief autobiographical references in some of his own writings. The same chronicle places him in the court of Charlemagne. This is apparently an error due to the confusion of Autpert with a certain Aspertus or Asbertus, who was chancellor of Prince Arnolfus from 888 to 892.

In 2009, Pope Benedict XVI gave a homily about him in Saint Peter's square. In this homily, Autpert's death date is given as 784 (older scholarship had given a date between 778 and 779).

== Works ==
Autpert's most famous work is his lengthy Expositio in Apocalypsin which is dependent upon a variety of patristic authors whom Autpert explicitly acknowledges, including Jerome, Victorinus, Ticonius, Augustine of Hippo, Primasius of Hadrumetum, and Gregory the Great. In fact, this commentary is one of the sources for a partial reconstruction of the lost Apocalypse commentary of the Donatist Ticonius. It is prefaced by a letter to Pope Stephen III in which Autpert defends himself from his detractors. His Vita sanctorum patrum Paldonis, Tatonis et Tasonis is an account of the three founders of the monastery at Volturno who through their pious lives offer an example of the imitation of Christ. His Libellus de conflictu vitiorum atque virtutum emphasizes monastic themes such as fear of God, obedience, and fidelity. Other works include Oratio contra septem vitia, Sermo de cupiditate, Sermo in purificatione sanctae Mariae, Homilia de transfiguratione Domini, and Sermo de adsumptione sanctae Mariae. Several additional sermons, known to have existed, have not survived. His extant sermons are marked by a strong mystical imprint. His commentaries on Leviticus, the Song of Songs, and the Psalms, mentioned in the Chronicon Vulturnese, are also not extant. Whether or not Autpert is the author of the hymn Ave maris stella is debated. The reason for this possible attribution is that Mary plays a significant theological role in both his sermons and Apocalypse commentary. She is not only a figure of the Church but also its most excellent member. As mother of Christ, she is also mother of the elect.

== Expositio in Apocalypsin ==
Autpert's masterpiece is considered his Expositio in Apocalypsin, a lengthy commentary on the Book of Revelation. Autpert refers to various early Christian writers to give his commentary authority. In addition, he uses the writers to correct heresy where he believed it to exist. Although he is very careful not to depart from the tradition of the Church or from orthodox teaching, his work is no mere string of patristic quotations. Throughout his Apocalypse commentary Christ is mystically identified with the Church, so much so that the Church actually begins with the birth of Christ. In addition, there is only one Church in heaven and on earth, not two. To those knowing the truth there is manifest one and the same Church, neither divided nor separated, which reigns with Christ in heaven, encompassing those members who have completed their struggle, and which reigns with Christ on earth, encompassing those members who continue in battle. The first resurrection (cf. Rev. 20:5b–6a), which implies a second, refers to the reign of Christ for a thousand years and the reign of the just with him. The second resurrection refers not to the resurrection of the flesh from dust but rather to the life of the soul rising from the abandonment of sin. The second death (cf. Rev. 20:6b) is eternal damnation. Gog and Magog (cf. Rev. 20:8) refer to the nations all over the earth which are agents of the devil persecuting the Church. The book of life (cf. Rev. 20:12) is the Old and New Testament, whose contemplation brings the elect to the light of day and the love of neighbour. The city of God continuously grows in number through the washing and regeneration of the Holy Spirit, and at the end of the present age the Last Judgment of God will come through his son Jesus Christ.

== Bibliography ==
- Paul the Deacon, Historia Langobardorum, VI, 40, in Monumenta Germaniae Historica in usum scholarum, Hannoverae 1878, p. 231.
- Morin, Germain (1910). "Le Conflictus d'Ambroise Autpert et ses points d'attache avec la Bavière". Revue Bénédictine. XXVII (1–4): 204–212. doi:10.1484/J.RB.4.03226.
- Manitius, Maximilianus (1911). Geschichte der lateinischen Literatur des Mittelalters. Vol. I. München. p. 287.
- D'Argenio, Massimo (1947). Ambrogio Autperto e la sua dottrina spirituale nella Vita dei tre Fondatori e nel Conflictus. Milan.
- Winandy, Jacques (1949). "Les dates de l'abbatiat et de la mort d'Ambroise Autpert". Revue Bénédictine. LIX (1–4): 206–210. doi:10.1484/J.RB.4.00225.
- Winandy, Jacques (1950). "L'oeuvre littéraire d'Ambroise Autpert". Revue Bénédictine. LX (1–4): 93–119. doi:10.1484/J.RB.4.00022.
- Winandy, Jacques (1953). Ambroise Autpert moine et théologien. Paris.
- Del Treppo, Mario (1953–1954). "Longobardi, Franchi e Papato in due secoli di storia vulturnense". Archivio Storico per le Province Napoletane. XXXIV: 37–59.
- Bovo, Mario (1957). "Le fonti del Commento di Ambrogio Autperto sull'Apocalisse". Miscellanea Biblica et Orientalia R. P. Athanasio Miller Oblata. Rome: 372–403.
- Weber, Robert (1960). "Édition princeps et tradition manuscrite du commentaire d'Ambroise sur l'Apocalypse". Revue Bénédictine. LXX: 526–533. doi:10.1484/J.RB.4.00434.
- Silvestre, Hubert (1982). "À propos de la récente édition des Opera omnia d'Ambroise Autpert". Scriptorium. 36 (2): 304–313. doi:10.3406/scrip.1982.1283.
- Barry, M. J. (2003). "Autpert, Ambrose, St.". In Berard Marthalar (ed.). New Catholic Encyclopedia. Vol. 1: A-Azt (2 ed.). Detroit: Thomson Gale. pp. 925–926.
