= Arechi Castle =

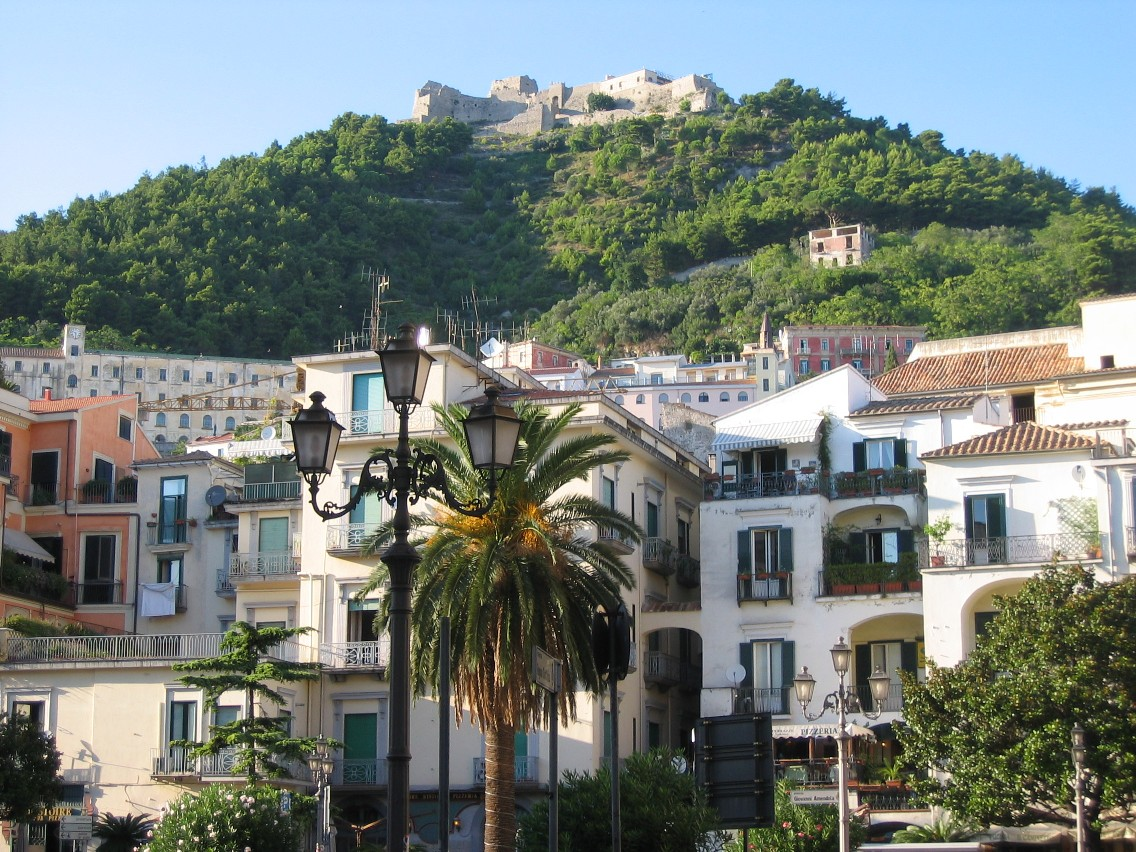
- Arechi Castle as seen from Salerno

- Location within Italy

General information
- Type: castle
- Location: Salerno
- Coordinates: 40.414°N 14.4517°E
- Completed: VI w.

Website
- http://www.ilcastellodiarechi.it/

Arechi Castle is a castle in southern Italy located on top of a mountain (about 360m above sea level), at the foot of which lies the city of Salerno.

== History ==
The construction of the castle began in the 6th century (over the remains of an old roman castrum) under the Byzantine rule (the construction of the oldest part of the ramparts made of sandstone blocks is characteristic of this period).

Salerno was part of the Duchy of Benevento, which was the southernmost part of the Kingdom of the Lombards. When Charlemagne attacked the Lombards in the year 774, the Duchy of Benevento was ruled by Arechi II. He moved the main centre of power from Benevento to Salerno in order to strengthen his control over strategic areas such as the coastline and to secure communications within the province of Campania. During this period the castle was heavily fortified and its ramparts took the shape that have survived to our times.

It was the place where lived the longobard rulers of the Principality of Salerno until the beginning of the Italian Rinascimento.

Over the centuries, the castle had many owners. Archaeological work has identified, among other things, traces of the Norman presence.

A watchtower was built north of the castle, allowing to conduct observations of the Gulf of Salerno. The castle suffered heavy damage during the 1694 earthquake and since then remained abandoned until the unification of Italy in 1861 (when was started a small initial reconstruction).

== Current condition ==
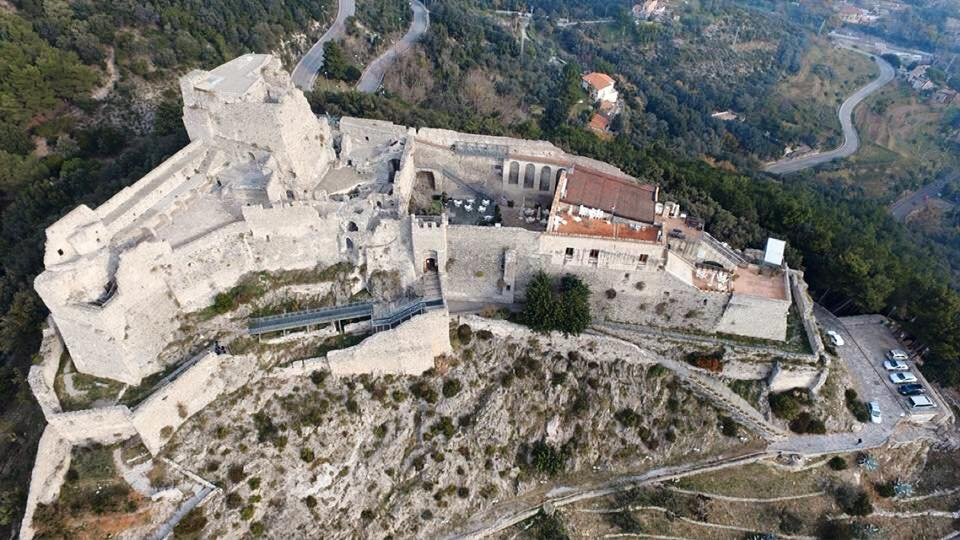
the actual Arechi castle

Currently, the castle has been partially rebuilt in the late 1950s, when most of the castle was reopened to the public.

It was recently bought from the Salerno's commune by a private company, that arranged a restaurant inside.

The defensive walls, however, are open to visitors free of charge. And there it is also a museum in the castle (large collections of coins and medieval ceramics were found during the renovation).

At night, perfectly lit, it is visible from almost anywhere in Salerno, where it is one of the main tourist attractions.

== Bibliography ==
- Magnusson, Magnus; Goring, Rosemary, eds. (1990). Cambridge Biographical Dictionary. Cambridge, UK: Cambridge University Press. ISBN 0-521-39518-6.

== See also ==
- Salerno
- Principality of Salerno
