= Adelchi =

Play written by Alessandro Manzoni

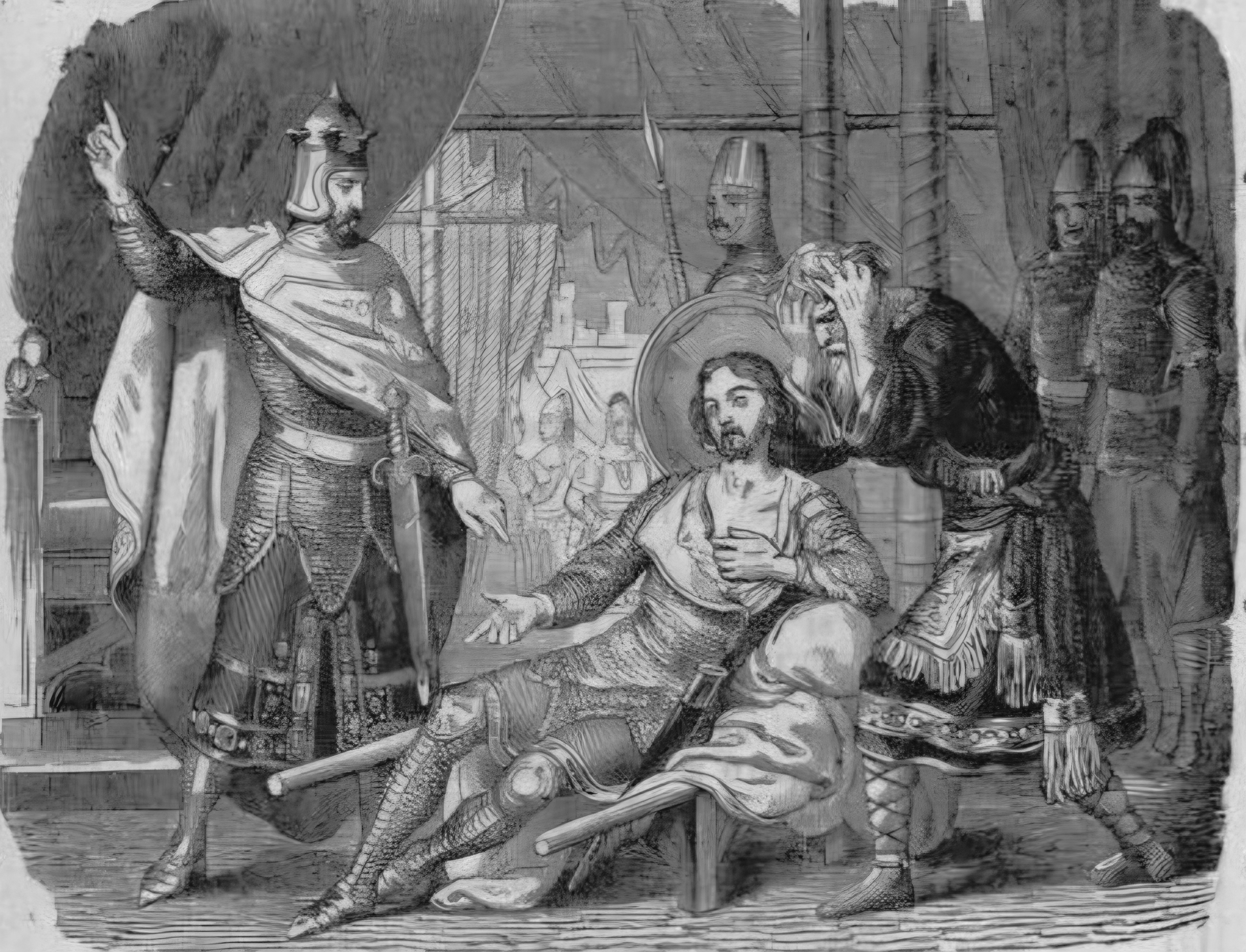
- Adelchi, mortally wounded, with his father Desiderius and Charlemagne
- Original language: Italian
- Written by: Alessandro Manzoni
- Characters: Adalgis; Desiderius; Charlemagne; Desiderata of the Lombards
- Genre: Tragedy

Premiere
- Date: August 1828
- Place: Florence

Adelchi (Italian pronunciation: [aˈdɛlki]) is the second tragedy written by Alessandro Manzoni. Set on the Italian Peninsula, the play was first published in 1822. The main character is Adelchis, the son of the last Lombard King Desiderius, torn by the inner conflict between his father's will and his own desire for peace.

== Synopsis ==
The tragedy has five acts and two choruses: it bears a touching dedication to Manzoni's wife, Henriette Blondel. Set in the 8th century, during the struggle between Franks and Lombards for the domination of Italy, it dramatizes the defeat of the Lombard king Desiderius and his son Adelchis by the Frankish emperor Charlemagne.

Ermengarda, the daughter of King Desiderius, repudiated by her husband Charlemagne, king of the Franks, goes back to Pavia to live with her father and brother, Adelchis. In the meantime Pope Adrian I has ordered Desiderius to leave the lands of the church; he refuses, and the pope asks Charlemagne for support.

In the war that follows, Adelchis successfully defends Italy from Charlemagne's army at the impregnable pass of Le Chiuse. Charlemagne is about to withdraw from the war when Martino, a deacon sent by the Archbishop of Ravenna, arrives on the scene and points out another pass across the Alps through which it is possible to attack the enemy's rear.

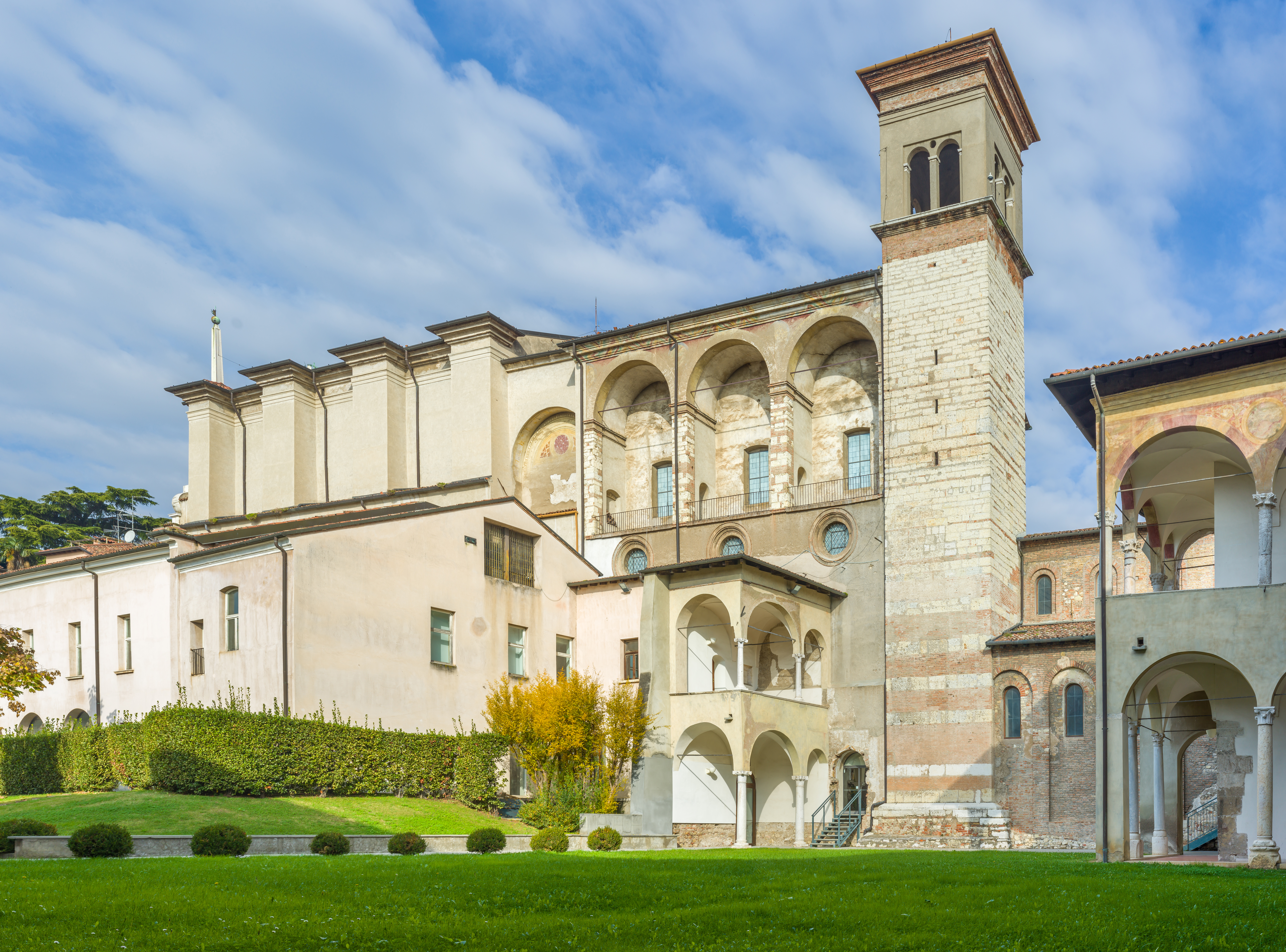
The monastery of San Salvatore in Brescia

Seized by panic, the Lombard army disbands in utter confusion. Adelchis rallies the fugitives and prepares to make a stand in the cities of Brescia, Pavia, and Verona. Meanwhile Ermengarda dies in the monastery of San Salvatore in Brescia, heartbroken and still in love with her culpable husband.

Treachery and fatigue hasten the fall of the Lombard cities. Pavia opens its gates to the Franks and Desiderius is taken prisoner. Adelchis realizes that all resistance is useless and leaves Verona.

Surprised by the enemy, he fights heroically and falls mortally wounded. He dies in Charlemagne's tent where not long before his father had vainly pleaded for mercy for him. Before he dies, Adelchi forgives Charlemagne in words that show clearly that he is aware of the vanity of all earthly power and glory.

Standing out in this drama is the figure of Adelchis. Adelchis is a romantic hero who is torn between the ideal of an unattainable justice and the cruel realities of life. He will have no part of the climate of bullying and betrayal, of contradiction and of injustice, in which he is forced to live while clearly seeing hard role of the honest man, this reflecting Manzoni's most pessimistic phase.

Ermengarda stands out too, she having been much appreciated by Benedetto Croce, who contrasted her with the chilly and self-controlled Lucia of the Betrothed. "Ermengarda is the freshest and richest creature of Manzoni's first poetic works: she lives in her dreams and in her frezies, in her delicacy and fragility, of a loving but betrayed woman'.

In the framework of the tragedy, Adelchis and Ermengarda represent the high-minded and unselfish but star-crossed and vanquished personages. Charlemagne and Desiderius, in contrast, are delineated as hard-handed power- hungry conquerors addicted to ambitious dreams of predominance beyond the limits of their own territories.

As in his previous tragedy, Il Conte di Carmagnola, Manzoni resorts to the chorus to express his own thoughts and feelings on the agelong national predicament of his homeland. The first chorus, at the end of act three, reiterates the theme of Italy's subjugation by foreign invaders and the poet's hope of its rebirth as a free and independent nation. The second chorus, following the scene of Ermengarda's death (IV, 1), contemplates the value of faith in a reward after life and the redemptive power of suffering.

== Critical assessment ==
Adelchi is considered the masterpiece of Italy's romantic theatre, it reaching heights of impassioned poetry – although owing to an at times too-analytic and reflective mood, it is not considered to be completely successful as a strictly theatrical work. Manzoni, a poet, is much more lyrical than tragic, and (in this work) he displayed clear signs of what Sapegno felicitously called an essentially narrative vocation, which would, in fact, come to find its outlet in The Betrothed. In the Adelchi anyway, the theme "is spontaneously and thoroughly intermingled with evocative and symbolic values. And the verses and the images flow out more willingly than ever, light, with the same density and intensity of figure and of meaning, but without the effort and the harshness and the dissonance that at times break the flow of harmony in other of Manzoni's lyrics". Manzoni's tragedies won him the praise of György Lukács, who considered him "the most important exponent of historical drama at the time in Western Europe."

== Legacy ==
Adelchi was first performend in 1843 by the Reale Sarda Compagnia. The tragedy was staged by several prominent Italian actors, including Ernesto Rossi in 1874, Vittorio Gassman in 1960 and Carmelo Bene in 1984. An opera based on Adelchi was produced at Vicenza in 1852, with music by Giuseppe Apolloni.

== English translations ==
- Alessandro Manzoni (2002). Two Plays. Translated by Michael J.Curley. New York: Peter Lang. ISBN 978-0820461588.
- Alessandro Manzoni's The Count of Carmagnola and Adelchis. Translated by Federica Brunori Deigan. Baltimore and London: Johns Hopkins University Press. 2004. ISBN 9780801878817.

== Sources ==
- Reynolds, Barbara (1948). "Verdi and Manzoni: An Attempted Explanation". Music & Letters. 29 (1): 31–43.
- Reízov, Boris; Lasorsa, Claudia (1968). "La teoria del processo storico nella tragedia «Adelchi» di A. Manzoni". Aevum. 42 (1/2): 70–90. JSTOR 25820667.
- Sapegno, Natalino (1974). Compendio di storia della letteratura italiana: Dal Foscolo ai moderni. Florence: La Nuova Italia.
- Radcliff-Umstead, Douglas (1974). "The Transcendence of Human Space in Manzonian Tragedy". Studies in Romanticism. 13 (1): 25–46. JSTOR 25599913.
- Banham, Martin, ed. (1998). The Cambridge Guide to Theatre. Cambridge: Cambridge UP. ISBN 0-521-43437-8.
- Wood, Ian (2008). ""Adelchi" and "Attila": The Barbarians and the Risorgimento". Papers of the British School at Rome. 76: 233–55. JSTOR 40311136.
- Battera, Francesca (2012). "«Dalla rea progenie degli oppressor discesa». Considerazioni sull'Ermengarda manzoniana". Lettere Italiane. 64 (3): 401–442. JSTOR 26240136.
