= Winigis =

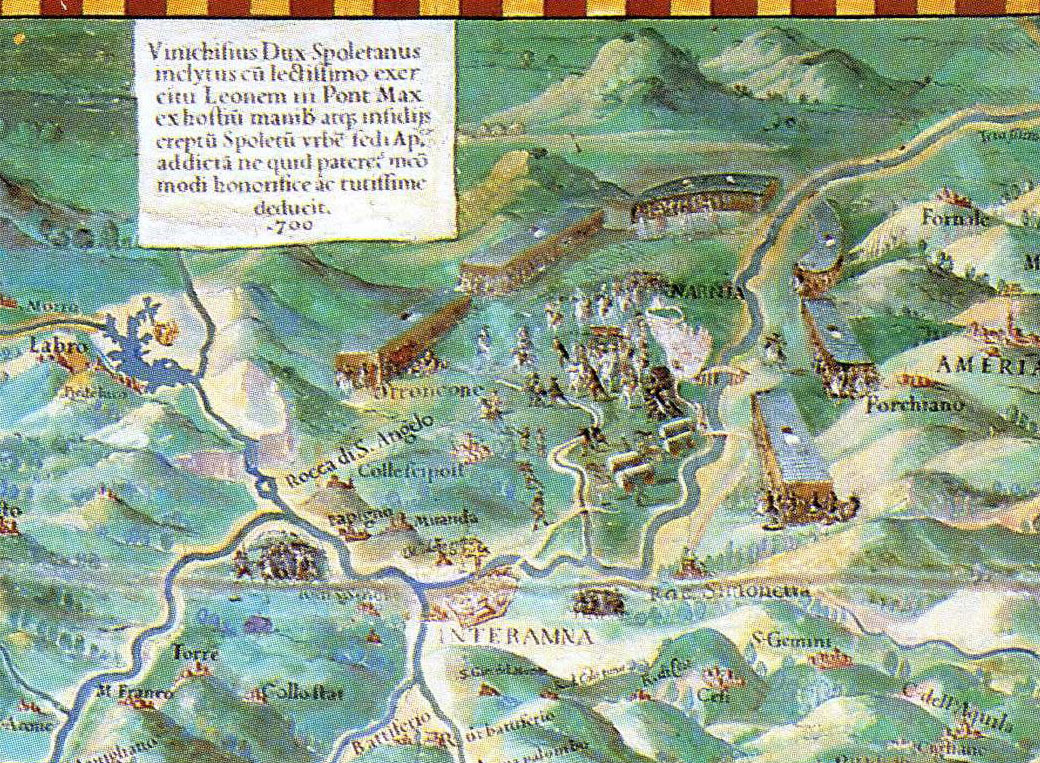
Rescue of Pope Leo III by Winigis; fresco by Ignazio Danti (1580)

Winigis, also spelled Winiges or Winichis (Note: Contemporary Latin: Winigisus, Italian: Guinigi(sio)) (died 822), was the Duke of Spoleto (dux Spolitanus) from 789 to his death. He was sent by Charlemagne in 788 with Frankish troops to assist Dukes Hildeprand of Spoleto and Grimoald III of Benevento against a Byzantine invasion.

In this, his first recorded action, he was successful, defeating a Byzantine expeditionary force led by Theodoros in Calabria in 788. Hildeprand, however, died on the campaign and Charlemagne appointed Winiges to succeed him in the Duchy of Spoleto.

Winiges was appointed by Charlemagne to act as his missus dominicus in the Ducatus Romae and he was at Saint Peter's Basilica when Pope Leo III was assaulted on 25 April 799. It was then he who brought him to shelter in Spoleto until he could safely return to Rome.

Winiges got involved in a war with Grimoald of Benevento, however, and was captured while being besieged at Lucera in 802. He was held captive for a year before being released in 803.

While Leo III was nearing death in 815, the Roman citizens revolted, but King Bernard sent Winiges to Rome to quell the unrest.

In 822, Winiges abdicated his worldly office and retired to a monastery, where he died not too long after (probably that same year). His successor was Suppo I, Brixiæ civitatis comes ("Count of the city of Brescia").

== Sources ==
- Hodgkin, Thomas. Italy and her Invaders. Clarendon Press: 1895.

Regnal titles
Preceded by Hildeprand	Duke of Spoleto; 789–822	Succeeded by Suppo I
