= Carloman I =

King of the Franks (r. 768–771) of the Carolingian dynasty

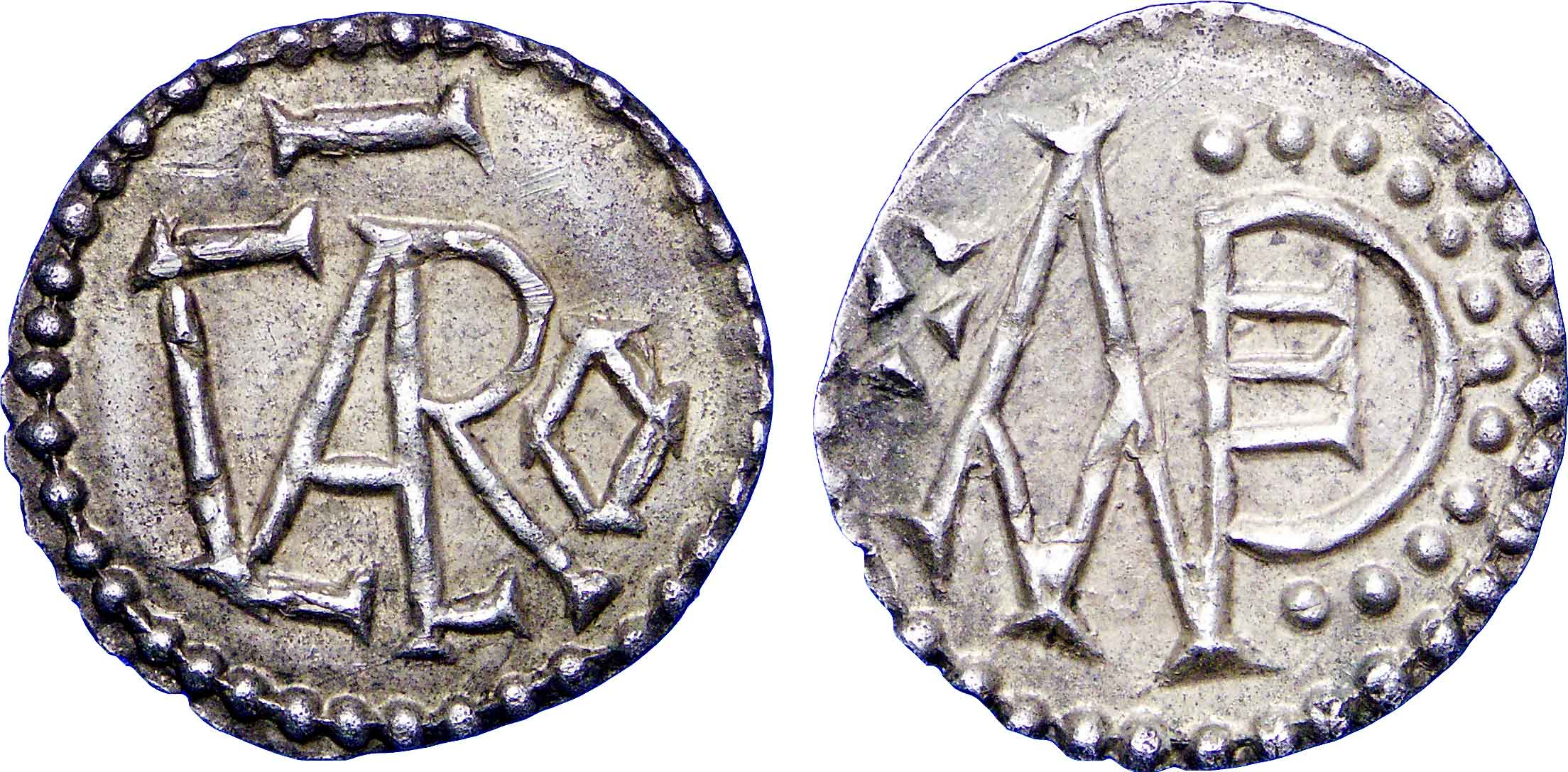
- A denarius minted by Carloman I

King of the Franks
- Reign: 9 October 768 – 4 December 771
- Predecessor: Pepin the Short
- Successor: Charles I
- Born: 28 June 751
- Died: 4 December 771 (aged 20)
- Spouse: Gerberga
- Issue: Pepin; Second son
- House: Carolingian dynasty
- Father: Pepin the Short
- Mother: Bertrada of Laon

Carloman I (28 June 751 – 4 December 771), German Karlmann, Karlomann, was king of the Franks from 768 until his death in 771. He was the second surviving son of Pepin the Short and Bertrada of Laon and was a younger brother of Charlemagne. His death allowed Charlemagne to take all of Francia.

== Split of the Frankish kingdom ==
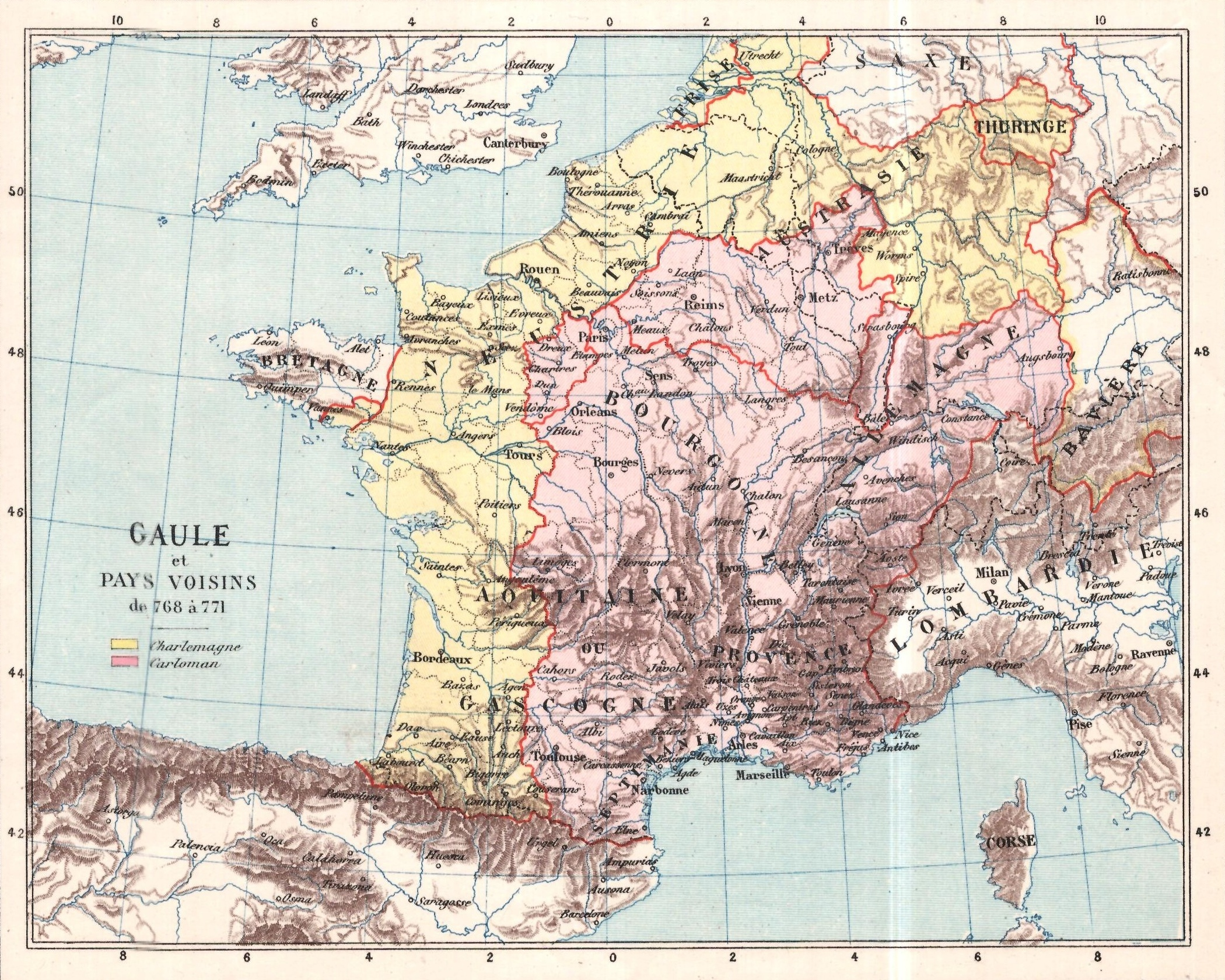
Carloman's kingdom in red (according to Auguste Longnon)

At the age of 3 he was, together with his father Pepin the Short and his elder brother Charlemagne, anointed King of the Franks and titled "Patrician of the Romans" by Pope Stephen II, who had left Rome to beg the Frankish King for assistance against the Lombards. Carloman and Charlemagne each inherited half of the Kingdom of the Franks upon Pepin's death. His share was based in the centre of the Frankish Kingdom, with his capital at Soissons, and consisted of the Parisian basin, the Massif Central, the Languedoc, Provence, Burgundy, southern Austrasia, Alsace, and Alemannia; the regions were poorly integrated and surrounded by those bequeathed to Charlemagne, and, although Carloman's territories were easier to defend than those of Charlemagne, they were also poorer in income.

It is commonly agreed that Carloman and Charlemagne disliked each other. However, the reasons behind this are unclear: some historians suggest that each brother considered himself rightfully to be the sole heir of their father – Charlemagne as the elder child, Carloman as the legitimate child (Charlemagne is sometimes claimed to have been born a bastard in 742, a claim not always accepted). Be that as it may, Pepin the Short's disposal of his kingdom appears to have exacerbated the bad relations between the pair since it required cooperation between the pair and left both feeling cheated.

== Competition with Charlemagne ==
Carloman's reign proved short and troublesome. The brothers shared possession of Aquitaine, which broke into rebellion upon the death of Pepin the Short; when Charlemagne campaigned to put down the revolt, Carloman led his own army to assist. The two quarreled at Moncontour, near Poitiers, and Carloman withdrew. This, it had been suggested, was an attempt to undermine Charlemagne's power since the rebellion threatened Charlemagne's rule. Charlemagne crushed the rebels, while Carloman's behaviour damaged his standing amongst the Franks. Relations between the two then degenerated further, requiring the mediation of their mother, Bertrada, who appears to have favoured Charlemagne, with whom she would live out her widowhood.

Rosamond McKitterick has argued, however, that our assumption about the relationship between the two brothers can't be based solely on a few examples and that there is no evidence to suggest that there was lasting animosity between the two. She also points out that Charlemagne showed great political pragmatism and astuteness throughout his reign and that it would have been in the brothers' common interest to work together to secure their dynasty's control over the Franks, having only recently gained royal power. She also argues that it cannot be assumed that Bertrada favoured one son over the other, pointing out the meeting between Bertrada and Carloman in 770 at Seltz.

In 770, his mother Bertrada began a series of diplomatic offensives to encircle Carloman. Charlemagne had married Desiderata, the daughter of the Lombard king Desiderius in Italy, which created an alliance between Charlemagne and the Lombards; Bertrada had also secured for Charlemagne the friendship of his cousin Tassilo III of Bavaria; she had even attempted to secure Papal support for the marriage by arranging for Desiderius to cede certain territories to Rome, to which the Papacy laid claim. Although Pope Stephen III remained hostile to an alliance between the Franks and the Lombards in theory, in reality, he was deeply conflicted between the threat the Lombards posed to him and the chance to dispose of the anti-Lombard Christopher the Primicerius, the dominant figure at the Papal court.

These maneuvers had generally favoured the Franks but posed serious threats to Carloman's position. He had been left without allies: he attempted to use his brother's alliance with the Lombards to his advantage in Rome, offering his support against the Lombards to Stephen III and entering into secret negotiations with the Primicerius, Christopher, who had been isolated by the Franco-Lombard rapprochement; but after the murder of Christopher by Desiderius, Stephen III gave his support to the Lombards and Charlemagne. However, Carloman's position was rescued by Charlemagne's sudden repudiation of his Lombard wife, Desiderius' daughter. Desiderius, outraged and humiliated, appears to have allied with Carloman in opposition to Charlemagne and the Papacy, which took the opportunity to declare itself against the Lombards.

== Death and legacy ==
Carloman died on 4 December 771 at the Villa of Samoussy; the death, sudden and convenient though it was, was set down to natural causes (a severe nosebleed is sometimes claimed as being at fault). At the time of his death, he and his brother Charlemagne were close to outright war, which Charlemagne's biographer Einhard attributes to the miscounsel of Carloman's advisors. Carloman was buried in Reims, but he was reburied in the Basilique Saint-Denis in the 13th century.

Carloman married a Frankish woman, Gerberga, who, according to Pope Stephen III, was chosen for him, together with Charlemagne's concubine, Himiltrude, by Pepin the Short. With Gerberga, he had two sons, the older of whom was named Pepin after his grandfather, marking him according to Carolingian tradition as the heir of Carloman, and of Pepin the Short. After Carloman's death, Gerberga expected her elder son to become king and for herself to rule as his regent; however, Carloman's former supporters – his cousin Adalhard, Abbot Fulrad of Saint Denis and Count Warin – turned against her, and invited Charlemagne to annex Carloman's territory, which he duly did. Gerberga then fled (according to Einhard, "for no reason at all") with her sons and Count Autchar, one of Carloman's faithful nobles, to the court of Desiderius, who demanded of the new Pope Hadrian I that he anoint Carloman's sons as kings of the Franks. Gerberga's flight ultimately precipitated Charlemagne's destruction of the Kingdom of the Lombards; he responded to Desiderius' support of Carloman's children, which threatened Charlemagne's position, by sweeping into Italy and subjugating it. Desiderius and his family were captured, tonsured, and sent to Frankish religious houses; the fate of Gerberga and her children by Carloman is unknown, although it is possible that they, too, were sent by Charlemagne to monasteries and convents.

Despite their complex relationship and the events following Carloman's death, Charlemagne would later name his second legitimate son "Carloman" after his deceased brother. This had, perhaps, been a public gesture to honour the boy's uncle's memory and quell any rumours about Charlemagne's treatment of his nephews. If so, it was swept away in 781, when Charlemagne had his son renamed as Pepin.

== Family ==
He had several children with Gerberga.

- Pepin (bef. 769)
- Unknown son (ca. 770)

Carloman I Carolingian Dynasty Born: 751 Died: 771
Preceded by Pepin the Short	King of the Franks; 768–771 with Charles I (768–771)	Succeeded by Charles I
