= Coelchu =

Coelchu, also called Colcu ua Duinechda (died 796), was the abbot of the school of Clonmacnoise in Ireland.

Coelchu was remarkable for his learning, and was surnamed "the Scribe", and also "the Wise". He is generally assumed to be the person with whom Alcuin apparently had some correspondence. In his letter Alcuin gives Coelchu an account of the state of religion on the Continent, mentions Joseph, one of Coelchu's pupils then in France, and speaks of disputes between King Charles and Offa of Mercia, on account of which he himself was likely to be sent as negotiator into England. This indicates that the letter was written shortly before 790.
