= Desiderata of the Lombards =

Queen of the Franks from 770 to 771

Queen consort of the Franks
- Tenure: 770 – 771
- Born: c. 754; Pavia
- Died: c. 776
- Spouse: Charlemagne
- Father: Desiderius, King of the Lombards
- Mother: Ansa

Desiderata (fl. 771) was a queen consort of the Franks. She was one of four daughters of Desiderius, King of the Lombards, and his wife Ansa, Queen of the Lombards. Desiderata was married to Charlemagne in 770 in effort to create a bond between Francia and the Kingdom of the Lombards. The marriage also sought to isolate Charlemagne's brother Carloman I, who ruled over the central territories of Francia. It lasted just one year, and there are no known children.

== Marriage to Charlemagne ==
Desiderata was the first (or possibly second) wife of Charlemagne. (There are questions about the nature of Charlemagne's relationship to Himiltrude, who may have been his first wife.) Carolingian historian Janet Nelson writes that the alliance between the Franks and Lombards arising out of the marriage to Desiderata was directed against Charlemagne's brother Carloman, whose territory it encircled. The marriage was opposed by Pope Stephen III, who in the summer of 770 wrote to Charlemagne and Carloman bemoaning the union between "the most notable race of the Franks and that fetid brood of the Lombard's that had brought leprosy into the land." There is no mention of this marriage in the Royal Frankish Annals or their revised version. However, it is mentioned briefly in chapter 18 of Einhard's Life of Charlemagne, which records that "at the urging of his mother, [Charlemagne] married a daughter of Desiderius."

== Debate surrounding her name ==
Although she is commonly referred to by the name Desiderata there is some debate surrounding her name. One school of thought is that the name derives from an editorial error in a 19th-century copy of the Monumenta Germaniae Historica which capitalized the 'D' in desideratam filiam (Latin for 'desired daughter'). Janet Nelson argues that it is far more likely that Desiderata's name is actually 'Gerperga.' Nelson provides multiple reasons as to why this is the case, firstly, the name fits in with the names of Desiderius' other daughters, all of which end in the suffix 'perga.' Secondly, Carloman's wife was called Gerberga, and this, Nelson believes, explains why when Gerberga fled to Desiderius after Carloman's death, the Annals of Lobbes believed that she was fleeing to her father, due to confusion over the similarities of their names. Additionally, in Pope Stephen III's letter to Charlemagne and Carloman, he is not sure of which brother is marrying Gerperga, Nelson argues that this confusion is also caused by the similarity in the names of Desiderius' daughter and Carloman's wife. The Italian writer Alessandro Manzoni in his tragedy Adelchi gave her the name Ermengarda.
