= Alboin of Spoleto =

Lombard Duke of Spoleto (757–758

Alboin was the Lombard Duke of Spoleto from 757 to 758. He was chosen to be duke by the Spoletan nobility without the assent of the king.

While Pope Stephen II was working to give the kingdom into the hands of Desiderius, he also worked to give the homage of the Duchies of Benevento and Spoleto to King Pepin the Short of the Franks. Alboin and Liutprand of Benevento commended their duchies to the Frankish king, who did not ask for it. Desiderius marched on and destroyed Spoleto and Benevento and Alboin was captured; Liutprand fled. Desiderius himself took up the exercise of ducal power in Spoleto.

== Sources ==
- Hallenbeck, Jan T. "Pavia and Rome: The Lombard Monarchy and the Papacy in the Eighth Century." Transactions of the American Philosophical Society, New Ser., Vol. 72, No. 4. (1982), pp. 1–186.

Regnal titles
Preceded by Ratchis	Duke of Spoleto; 757–758	Succeeded by Desiderius
