= Paul the Deacon =

8th-century Benedictine monk, scribe and historian

Dom Paul the Deacon OSB
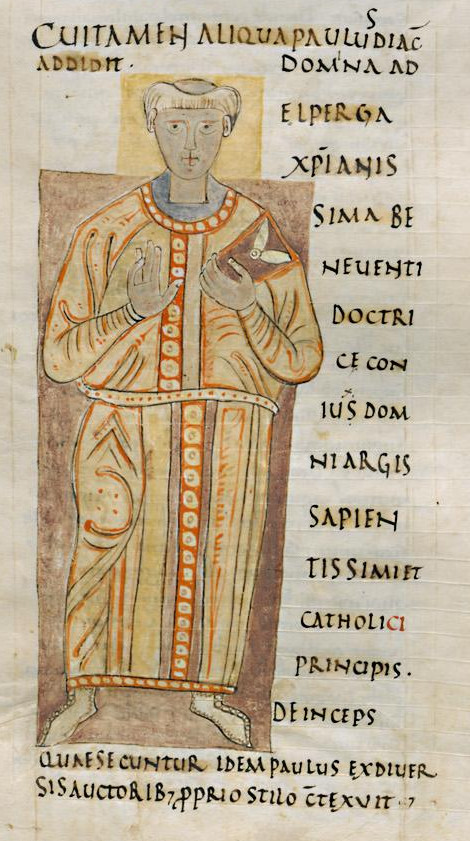
- Portrait of Paulus Diaconus from a 10th-century manuscript (Laurentian Library Plut. 65.35 fol. 34r)
- Title: Deacon

Personal life
- Born: Paulus Warnefridus c. 720s Cividale del Friuli, Kingdom of the Lombards
- Died: 13 April in 796, 797, 798, or 799 AD Monte Cassino, Patrimony of Saint Peter
- Parent(s): Warnefrid and Theodelinda
- Known for: History of the Lombards
- Occupation: Benedictine monk, scribe, and historian

Religious life
- Religion: pre-Schism Latin Church
- Order: Benedictines
- Ordination: c. 782

Paul the Deacon (c. 720s – 13 April in 796-99 AD), also known as Paulus Diaconus, Warnefridus, Barnefridus, or Winfridus, and sometimes suffixed Cassinensis ("of Casīnum", the citadel of which was present day Monte Cassino), was a Benedictine monk, scribe, and historian of the Lombards of Latin language.

== Life ==
An ancestor of Paulus's named Leupichis emigrated to Italy in 568 in the train of Alboin, King of the Lombards. There, he was granted lands at or near Forum Julii (Cividale del Friuli). During an invasion by the Avars, Leupichis's five sons were carried away to Pannonia, but one of them, his namesake, returned to Italy and restored the ruined fortunes of his house. The grandson of the younger Leupichis was Warnefrid, who by his wife Theodelinda became the father of Paul. Paulus was his monastic name; he was born Winfrid, son of Warnefrid, about 720 in the Duchy of Friuli.

Thanks to the possible noble status of his family, Paul received an exceptionally good education, probably at the court of the Lombard king Ratchis in Pavia, learning the rudiments of Greek from a teacher named Flavian. Paul was probably the secretary of the Lombard king Desiderius, a successor of Ratchis. After Desiderius's daughter Adelperga had married Arichis II, duke of Benevento, Paul, at her request, wrote his continuation of Eutropius's Summary of Roman History (Latin: Breviarium Historiae Romanae).

He lived at the court of Benevento for at least several years before 774, when Charlemagne captured Pavia, and he may have fled the city during that conquest. Eventually he entered a monastery on Lake Como, and before 782 he entered the great Benedictine house of Monte Cassino, where he made the acquaintance of Charlemagne. Around 776, Paul's brother Arichis was carried off to Francia as a prisoner after a revolt in Friuli. When Charlemagne visited Rome five years later, Paul wrote to him on behalf of Arichis, who was then freed.

After Paul's literary achievements had drawn the attention of Charlemagne, he became an important contributor to the Carolingian Renaissance. In 787 he returned to Monte Cassino, where he died on 13 April probably in the year 799. His epithet Diaconus indicates that he took orders as a deacon; and some believe he was a monk before the fall of the Lombard Kingdom.

== Works ==
Paul's chief work is his Historia Langobardorum, an incomplete history in six books that he wrote after 787 but no later than 795–96. It covers the history of the Langobards from their legendary origins in the north (in "Scadinavia") and their subsequent migrations—notably to Italy in 568–69—to the death of King Liutprand in 744. The books contain much information about the Eastern Roman Empire, the Franks, and other peoples. The history is written from a Lombardian point of view and is especially valuable for its depictions of the relations between the Franks and the Lombards. It begins:

The region of the north, in proportion as it is removed from the heat of the sun and is chilled with snow and frost, is so much the more healthful to the bodies of men and fitted for the propagation of nations, just as, on the other hand, every southern region, the nearer it is to the heat of the sun, the more it abounds in diseases and is less fitted for the bringing up of the human race.

Among Paul's sources were the document called the Origo gentis Langobardorum, the Liber pontificalis, the lost history of Secundus of Trent, and the lost annals of Benevento. He also heavily drew upon the works of Bede, Gregory of Tours, and Isidore of Seville.

Related to his history of the Langobards is Paul's Historia Romana; this is a continuation of Eutropius's Breviarium, which covers the period 364–553 CE. Paul compiled the Historia Romana at Benevento between 766 and 771. He is said to have advised Adelperga to read Eutropius; she did, but complained that this pagan writer said nothing about ecclesiastical affairs and stopped with the accession of the Emperor Valens in 364. Consequently, Paul interwove extracts from the Scriptures, from ecclesiastical historians, and from other sources with the writings of Eutropius. The six books he ultimately added thus carried Lombardian history down to 553. This work, which was very popular during the Middle Ages, has value for its early historical presentation of the end of the Roman Empire in Western Europe. It was edited by Hans Droysen and published in the Monumenta Germaniae Historica. Auctores antiquissimi series, Band ii. (1879) as well as by A. Crivellucci, in Fonti per la storia d' Italia, N° 51 (1914).

At the request of Angilram, Bishop of Metz (d. 791), Paul wrote a history of the bishops of Metz to 766, the first work of its kind north of the Alps. This was translated into English in 2013 as Liber de episcopis Mettensibus. He also wrote many letters, verses, and epitaphs, including those of Duke/Prince Arichis II of Benevento and of many members of the Carolingian family. Some of these letters were published with the Historia Langobardorum in the Monumenta; poems and epitaphs edited by Ernst Dümmler were published in the Poetae latini aevi carolini, Band i. (Berlin, 1881). Fresher material having come to light, a newer edition of the poems (Die Gedichte des Paulus Diaconus) was edited by Karl Neff (Munich, 1908). Neff denied, however, that Paul had written the most famous poem in the collection, the hymn to St. John the Baptist Ut queant laxis, which Guido of Arezzo set to a melody that had previously been used for Horace's Ode 4.11. From the initial syllables of the first verses of the resultant setting, Guido then took the names of the first notes of the musical scale. Paul also wrote an epitome, which has survived, of Sextus Pompeius Festus's De verborum significatu, which he dedicated to Charlemagne.

While Paul was in Francia, Charlemagne asked him to compile a collection of homilies. Paul granted this request after returning to Monte Cassino; the compilation was largely used in the Frankish churches. Paul also composed two important homilies In Assumptione, in the second of which, unlike Ambrose Autpert, he admits the possibility of Mary's bodily assumption into heaven.

A life of Pope Gregory the Great has also been attributed to Paul, and he is credited with a Latin translation of the Greek Life of Saint Mary the Egyptian.
