= San Vincenzo al Volturno =

Historic Benedictine monastery in Isernia, Italy

Coordinates: 41°38′56.02″N 14°05′01.00″E

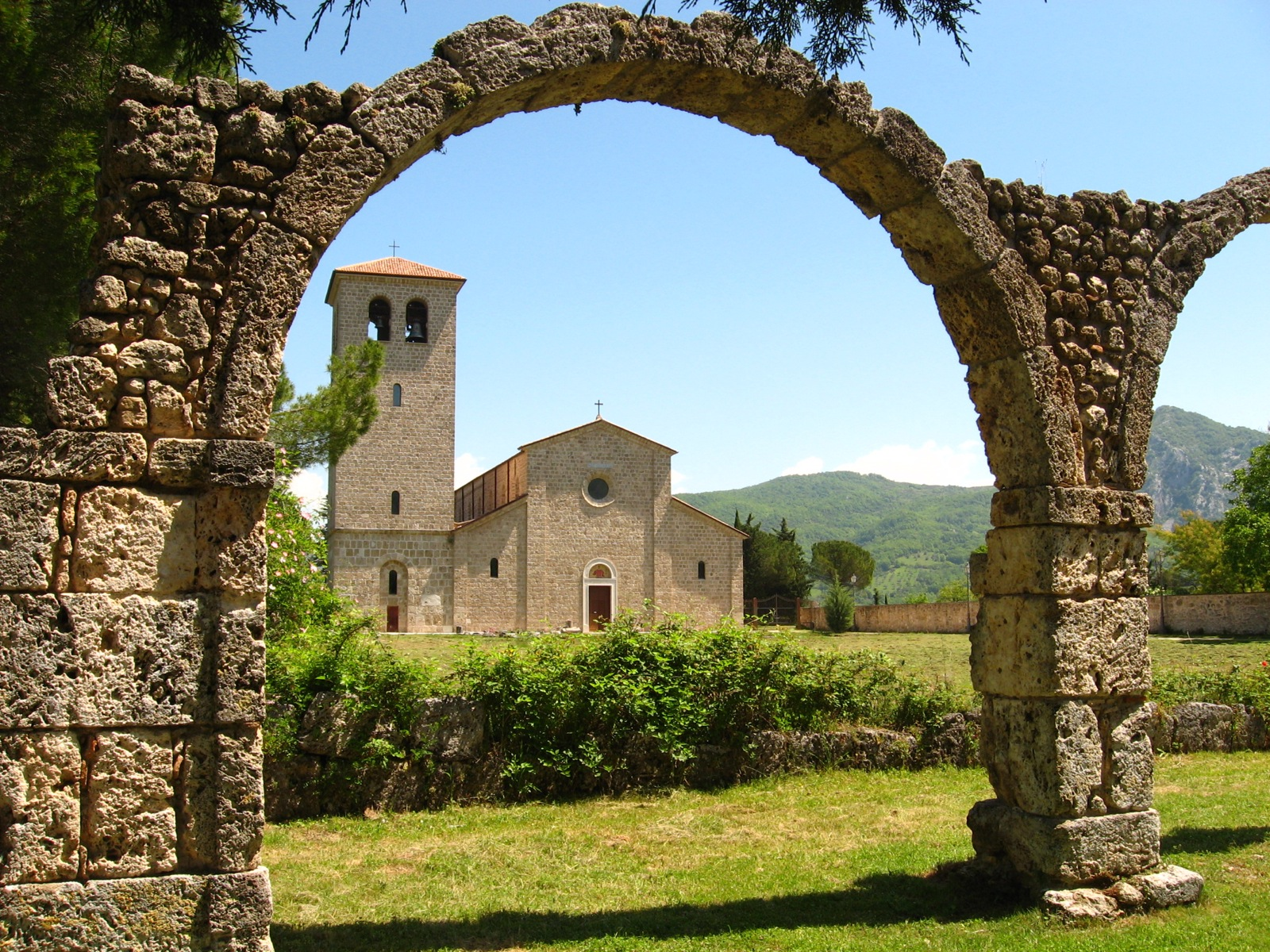
The monastery of San Vincenzo al Volturno

San Vincenzo al Volturno is a historic Benedictine monastery located in the territories of the Comunes of Castel San Vincenzo and Rocchetta a Volturno, in the Province of Isernia, near the source of the river Volturno in Italy. The current monastery, housing a group of eight Benedictine nuns, is located to the east of the river, while the archaeological monastery of the early Middle Ages was located on the west.

The medieval history of the monastery appears in the Chronicon Vulturnense, an illuminated manuscript. A monk of the monastery, Iohannes, composed the Chronicle in circa 1130, using sources from the eighth, ninth and tenth centuries which were available to him, probably in the monastery archives, as well as hagiographic inclusions about some of the historic figures. The aims of the Chronicle may have been to codify the memory of the community and its history in the face of Norman expansion in southern Italy. The manuscript, written in a Beneventan hand and including numerous images, is housed at the Biblioteca Apostolica Vaticana, BAV Barb. lat. 2724.

The monastery has been the subject of long-running archaeological investigation, which took place in a number of campaigns. In the 1970s Dom Angelo Pantoni, a monk from Monte Cassino excavated the area to the east of the river, where the later medieval monastery was built. The San Vincenzo Project began in 1980, led by Richard Hodges, then of the University of Sheffield, and the Soprintendenza archaeologica del Molise. Excavation continued between 1980 and 1986, in the area around the so-called Crypt of Epiphanius and the monastery on the west side of the river Volturno. These scientific excavations continued through the 1980s and 1990s under the direction of Hodges and with the support of the British School at Rome, the abbey of Monte Cassino, and the Soprintendenza archaeologica del Molise. From 1999, the project has been directed by Federico Marazzi, of the Istituto Universitario Suor Orsola Benincasa, Naples.

== History ==
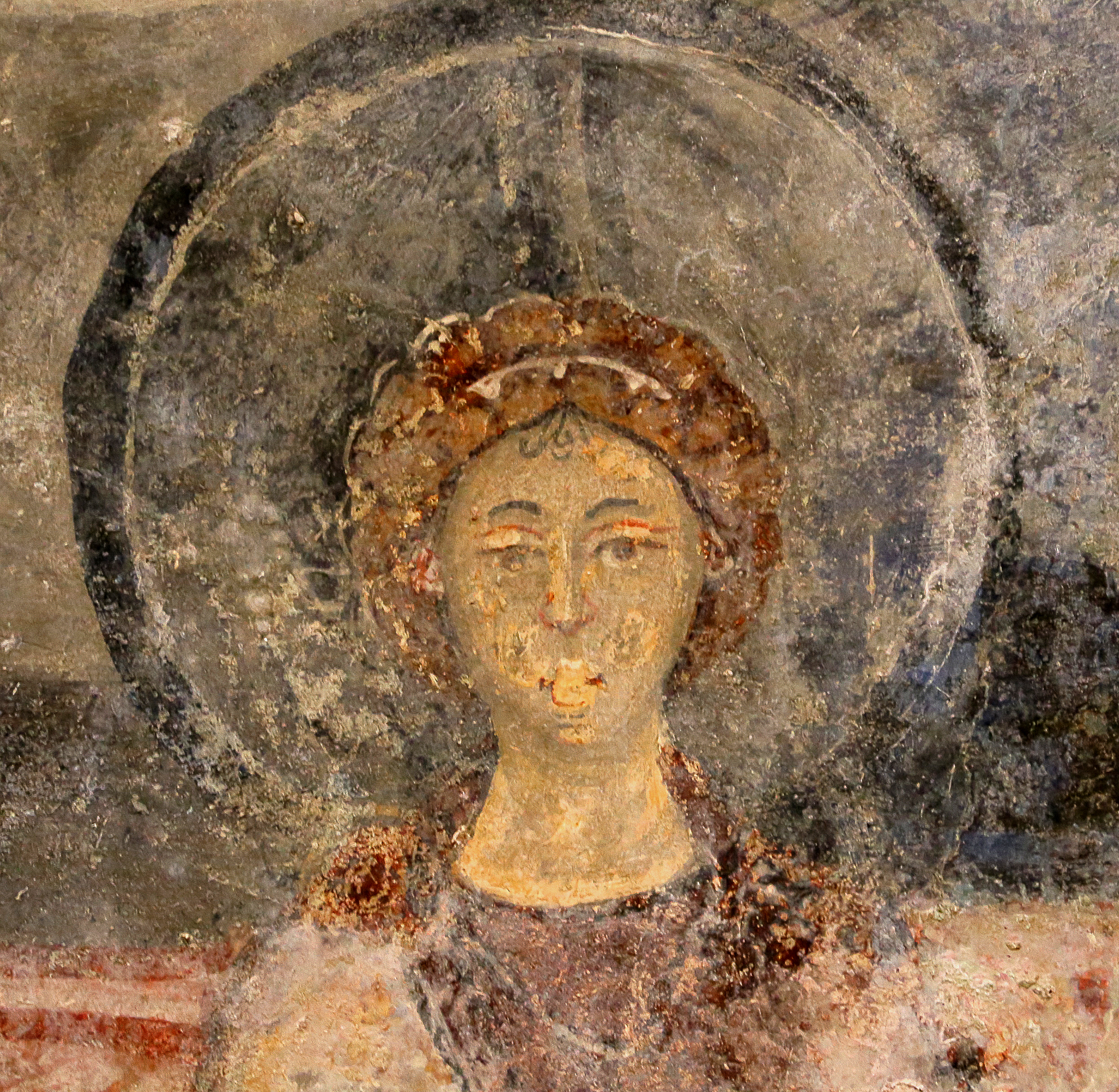
Fresco depicting the Archangel Raphael, from the mid-ninth century (San Vincenzo al Volturno)

The monastery was founded on a site which had been occupied in the pre-Roman period by Samnite peoples, and which had a villa or estate in the early to mid-fifth century. The late-antique fortified estate was abandoned in the fifth century, then in the mid-fifth century, a funerary church was constructed.

According to the Chronicon Vulturnense, the monastery was founded by three noblemen from Benevento named Paldo, Tato and Taso, in 731. The story goes that they were advised to found the monastery on the banks of the Volturno by the abbot of the powerful Abbey of Farfa, north of Rome. Thomas of Maurienne, the abbot of Farfa, suggested the site because, according to the Chronicle, it was home to an oratory founded by Constantine I. The Chronicle's emphasis on the Beneventan origin of the founders suggests that the early monastery enjoyed the patronage of the dukes of Benevento.

With the rise of the Franks and the development of the Papal states, the monastery's location on the border of Lombard and papal/Frankish territory became increasingly strategic. The abbots of the monastery in the late eighth century alternated between Franks and Lombards: Ambrosius Autpertus, elected 777, was a Frank; Poto, elected 781, was a Lombard. He was accused of disloyalty to the Franks for refusing to chant a hymn in honour of the Frankish family. The rest of the monks were obliged to swear an oath of loyalty. Charlemagne conceded fiscal and jurisdictional privileges to the community, making it one of the most independent and powerful abbeys of Europe. The abbots Iosue, Talaricus and Epiphanius in the early ninth century increased the numbers of monks to over 300 and expanded the territories and possessions all over central and southern Italy. Between 779 and 873 the monastery was in constant dispute with the peasants of the Valle Trita over dues and labour.

The Chronicle reports that in 848 the abbey was damaged by an earthquake. In 860, Sawdan, emir of Bari, was paid a handsome tribute not to sack the monastery. In 881, however, Saracens paid by the Duke of Naples, Athanasius, burned and raided the monastery. Surviving monks fled to Capua. They returned in 914 to reconstruct a monastery, but only at the end of the tenth century were they able to reestablish the community in a permanent way, and then with the aid of the emperors Otto II and Otto III. The location of the monastery was transferred to a new, more defensible position on the east side of the river. In 1115 Pope Paschal II consecrated the new abbey church. The twelfth-century Norman conquest of Abruzzo eventually led to the breakdown of the monastery's power. In 1349 a new earthquake destroyed the monastery and left the area open to the expansion of the abbey of Monte Cassino. The monastery was occupied by increasingly fewer monks, and from the fifteenth century it was governed externally. In 1669 the monastery and all its remaining properties were awarded to Monte Cassino.

The monastery was bombed in World War II and severely damaged. In 1989 San Vincenzo al Volturno became home to a new monastic community, the Benedictine nuns of the Connecticut Abbey of Regina Laudis who had to leave the monastery in 2015. During the earthquake of 2016 another monastic foundation brought eight young benedictin nuns to the Abbey of S. Vincenzo, willing to continue monastic life in the millenary abbey.
