= Arechis II of Benevento =

8th-century Italian duke

Duke Arechis, from a 10th- or early 11th-century manuscript of Lombard law

Arechis II (also Aretchis, Arichis, Arechi or Aregis) (born c. 734 – died 26 August 787) was a Duke of Benevento, in Southern Italy. He sought to expand the Beneventos' influence into areas of Italy that were still under Byzantine control, but he also had to defend against Charlemagne, who had conquered northern Italy.

== Genealogy ==
Arechis was descended from the Lombards, who had invaded the Italian Peninsula in the late sixth century. The Lombards established their kingdom in northern Italy. Its capital was at Pavia, and it also included two independent southern duchies—the Spoleto and Benevento.

Arechis was the son of Duke Liutprand, whom he succeeded in 758. Arechis continued to use the title Duke of Benevento until the Lombard kingdom fell to Charlemagne in 774. Arechis adopted the title Prince of Benevento after the fall of the kingdom—probably as a gesture of independence—and continued to use it until his death in 787.

== Family ==
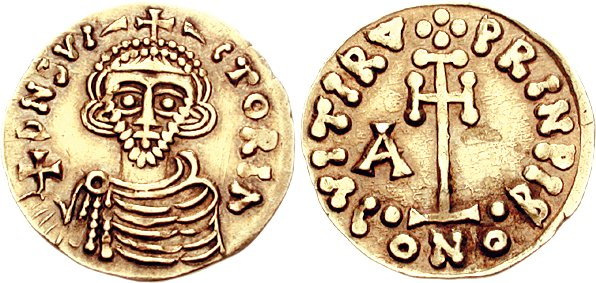
A tremissis bearing Arechis's image after he took the title princeps (prince)

Around 757, Arechis married Adelperga, a daughter of the northern Lombard king Desiderius. Arechis established friendly—but largely independent—relations with Desiderius. This lasted until 774, when the Lombard kingdom fell to the Franks and Desiderius was deposed. The Beneventan couple produced five children: three boys and two girls.

== Cultural contributions ==
By eighth century standards, Adelperga and Arechis were notable patrons of culture. Adelperga commissioned the major Lombard writer Paul the Deacon to produce his Historia Romana, a textbook of Roman history which was widely used during the rest of the Middle Ages. Some historians also argue that they commissioned Paul's more famous Historia gentis Langobardorum although this is uncertain. Arechis arranged for the transfer of saints' relics to the newly commissioned church of Santa Sofia in Benevento. The church still survives, albeit heavily restored. It is decorated with rare eighth-century frescoes.

Arechis also put resources into building projects in Salerno, including a new palace and castle. Salerno became an increasingly important port city during Arechis's reign. Major southern monasteries, such as Montecassino and San Vincenzo al Volturno also received substantial donations from him.

== Political activities ==
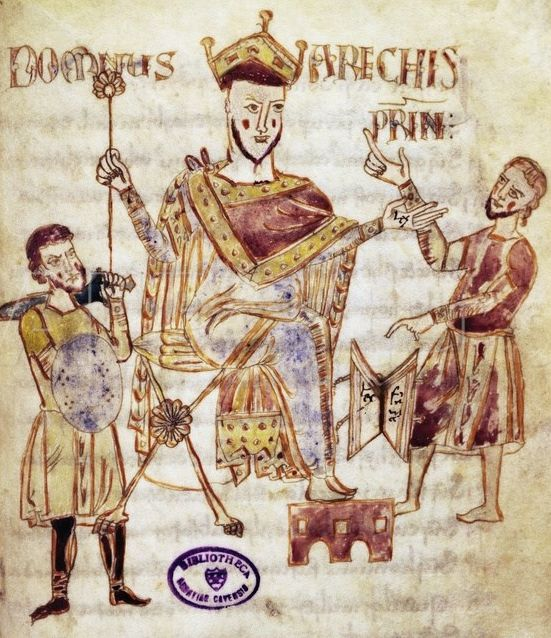
Arechis, from the Codex legum Langobardorum

Arechis was Duke when Charlemagne conquered the north Italian Lombard kingdom in 774. Although Arechis refused to submit when Charlemagne made himself king of the Lombards, Benevento was left largely unmolested. That same year Arechis adopted the title of "prince of Benevento". He also issued a handful of laws. Both these acts were probably intended as a gesture of defiance against Charlemagne—until this time only the Lombard kings had enacted laws. Since Charlemagne now styled himself king of the Lombards, Arechis was effectively rejecting Charlemagne's right to this title.

In November 774, immediately after being solemnly crowned Prince, Arechi II decided to send members of the Cortisani and Baccari families to occupy the middle area of the Biferno river, naming them as gestalds, the official royal authority in the area.

In 776, Arechis was probably involved in a Lombard conspiracy to throw off Frankish domination. Charlemagne successfully crushed this revolt, which was mostly focused in northeastern Friuli. Arechis did not seem to have provided much practical support for the rebellion and Charlemagne was forced to hurry back north of the Alps, rather than dealing with Arechis. Once again, geographical distance had protected Arechis from the Franks.

Arechis's Beneventan state continued to skirmish with and try to seize territory from the neighbouring Byzantine duchy of Naples. At some point, however, perhaps in the mid-780s, Arechis reached an agreement with the Duke of Naples set out in a document called a pactum. This agreement sets forth detailed provisions dealing with landholding and dispute settlement. It may have been intended to relieve Benevento, which was facing the looming Frankish threat.

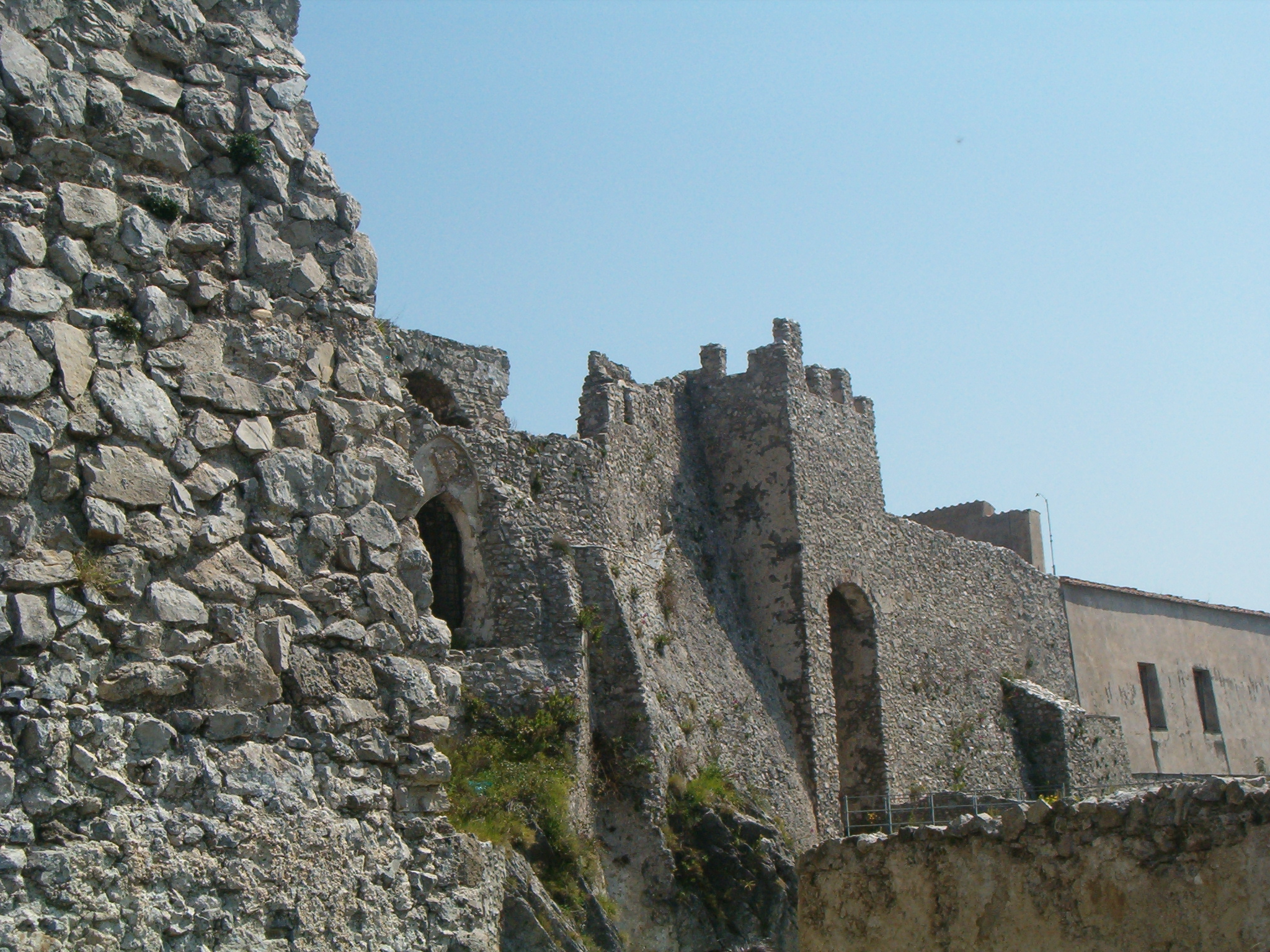
Ruins of the Castello di Arechi, a fortress augmented by Arechis after moving his capital to Salerno

This crystallised in 787, when Charlemagne advanced into south Italy and besieged Capua, an important town in the principality of Benevento. Arechis left Benevento itself and retreated to his new centre, the port of Salerno. Under pressure, Arechis apparently submitted to Frankish suzerainty. As Einhard, Charlemagne's biographer, describes it in his Vita Caroli Magni:

He [Charlemagne] afterwards entered Italy in person with his army [787], and passed through Rome to Capua, a city in Campania, where he pitched his camp and threatened the Beneventans with hostilities unless they should submit themselves to him. Their duke, Aragis, escaped the danger by sending his two sons, Rumold and Grimold, with a great sum of money to meet the King, begging him to accept them as hostages, and promising for himself and his people compliance with all the King's commands, on the single condition that his personal attendance should not be required. The King took the welfare of the people into account rather than the stubborn disposition of the Duke, accepted the proffered hostages, and released him from the obligation to appear before him in consideration of his handsome gift. He retained the younger son only as hostage, and sent the elder back to his father, and returned to Rome, leaving commissioners with Aragis to exact the oath of allegiance, and administer it to the Beneventans. He stayed in Rome several days in order to pay his devotions at the holy places, and then came back to Gaul [787].

Superficially, Charlemagne seemed to have imposed himself on Benevento. Arechis had paid tribute and one of his sons was being held hostage as a guarantee of Benevento's loyalty. Frankish influence was also given formal expression. Traditionally Benevento had produced and used gold coinage, but in 787 the Beneventan mint began to strike silver coins too. The new coins were similar to those issued by Charlemagne's Frankish kingdom. Both the new silver and the traditional gold coins, as well as Beneventan legal documents, all started to include Charlemagne's name and title alongside those of Arechis. The inclusion of titles on coins and in charters was considered an important marker of political authority.

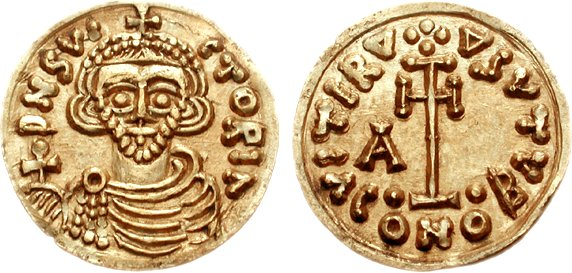
Another tremissis of Arechis

However, Einhard overstates Charlemagne's success. Frankish influence in Benevento proved to be very short-lived. In 788, both Grimoald's elder brother, Romuald, and Arechis himself died. Grimoald III, who was being held hostage by Charlemagne, succeeded as Prince of Benevento. Unwisely, Charlemagne released Grimoald in return for an oath of loyalty. Grimoald did not keep his promise; by c. 791, he had effectively proclaimed himself independent and successfully resisted the Franks. Grimoald later tried to throw off Frankish suzerainty, but Charlemagne's sons, Pepin of Italy and Charles the Younger, forced him to submit in 792.

== Bibliography ==
- Berto, Luigi Andrea, ed. (2021). The Little History of the Lombards of Benevento by Erchempert: A Critical Edition and Translation of 'Ystoriola Longobardorum Beneventum Degentium'. Taylor & Francis.
- Berto, Luigi Andrea (2022). The 'Other', Identity, and Memory in Early Medieval Italy. Taylor & Francis.
- Einhard. The Life of Charlemagne. Translated by Samuel Epes Turner.
- King, P. D. (1987). Charlemagne: Translated Sources. Lancaster.
- Kreutz, Barbara M. (1991). Peters, Edward (ed.). Before the Normans: Southern Italy in the Ninth and Tenth Centuries. University of Pennsylvania Press.
- Noble, T. F. X. (1984). The Republic of St. Peter: the Birth of the Papal State, 680–825. Philadelphia. ISBN 9780812279177.
- Oman, Charles (1914). The Dark Ages, 476–918. London.
- Wickham, Christopher (1981). Early Medieval Italy: Central Power and Local Society, 400–1000. London.

Regnal titles
Preceded by Liutprand	Duke of Benevento; As Prince from 774; 754–787	Succeeded by Grimoald III
