= Desiderius =

King of the Lombards from 756 to 774

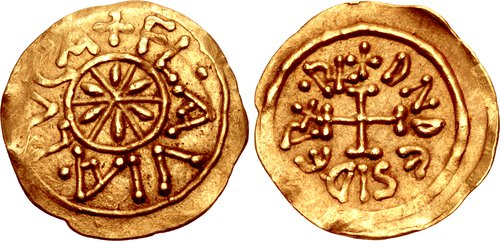
- A gold tremissis of Desiderius minted at Lucca

King of the Lombards
- Reign: 756–774
- Predecessor: Aistulf
- Successor: Charlemagne
- Born: 720 AD
- Died: 786 AD (aged 65–66)
- Consort: Ansa
- Issue: Desiderata; Anselperga; Adelperga; Liutperga; Adelchis
- House: Lombardy

Desiderius, also known as Daufer or Dauferius (born c. 720 – died c. 786), was king of the Lombards in Northern Italy, ruling from 756 to 774. He was dux of Tuscia prior to ascending the throne upon the death of Aistulf. He consolidated his authority by suppressing a revolt mounted by Aistulf's deposed predecessor Ratchis and by subduing the recalcitrant southern duchies of Spoleto and Benevento. Pursuing, in the manner of his predecessors, an expansionist policy across the Italian Peninsula, Desiderius repeatedly came into conflict with the papacy, at one point installing his own claimant to the Holy See, an antipope whose appointment collapsed within a single day.

The Frankish king Charlemagne married one of Desiderius's daughters in 770, only to repudiate her the following year; this rupture, compounded by Pope Hadrian I's appeal for Frankish intervention against continued Lombard encroachment on papal territory, precipitated Charlemagne's invasion of Italy in 773. After an eight-month siege, Charlemagne captured Pavia and Desiderius himself, exiling the deposed king to the abbey of Corbie and, in an unprecedented act of dynastic absorption for a Germanic ruler, assumed the royal style of a kingdom he had subdued. Desiderius is remembered accordingly for his fateful connection to Charlemagne and for having been the last Lombard king. In Brescia, Desiderius founded the monastic church of San Salvatore, which still stands as a testament to Lombard architecture. Centuries later, he was reimagined as an emblem of failed kingship by Italian authors. For instance, in Alessandro Manzoni's tragedy Adelchi, Desiderius is portrayed as a vain ruler destroyed by his own ambition.

== Rise to power ==
Born in Brescia, Desiderius was originally a royal officer, the dux of Tuscia and he became king after the death of Aistulf in 756. (Note: French historian Pierre Riché claims that Aistulf's death was providential for it "allowed the pope to influence the royal election in Pavia" in favor of Desiderius.) At that time, Aistulf's predecessor, Ratchis, left his monastic retreat of Montecassino and tried to seize the kingdom, but Desiderius put his revolt down quickly with the support of Pope Stephen II. At his coronation, Desiderius promised to restore many lost papal towns to the Holy See and even enlarge the Papal State.

By 757, Desiderius began securing his power, taking what historian Walter Goffart terms, "vigorous steps to suppress resistance to himself in the powerful duchies of Spoleto, in central Italy, and Benevento, to the south." When the upstart Liutprand (Duke of Benevento)—who despised Desiderius—challenged his kingship and threatened to place himself under the protection of Pepin the Short, Desiderius obtained naval assistance from Byzantium and put an end to Liutprand's defiant actions. The Lombard king then granted Liutprand's former duchy to his foe's son, Arechis. In that same year, Desiderius deposed Alboin of Spoleto and exercised the ducal powers there himself. Seeking, like his predecessors, to extend Lombard power in Italy, Desiderius challenged the papacy and vied for the southern duchies. In the August of 759, Desiderius made his son Adelchis associate King of Lombardy. (Note: Adelchis and Desiderius co-ruled the region until they were deposed in June 774.)

Shortly after visiting Rome, where he prayed at the tomb of St. Peter, Desiderius "returned to the aggressive expansive policy of his predecessors." He even negotiated with Byzantium in an arrangement that would have eroded papal authority and resulted in further territorial loss for the Holy See in Rome. Sometime in 760, envoys from Pepin convinced Desiderius to return some of the cities he captured back to the papacy, but the Lombard king did not follow through on his promises.

== Appointing Antipope Philip ==
Intervening in the crisis that ensued after the death of Pope Paul I in 767, Desiderius seized a priest named Philip from the Monastery of St. Vitus (Note: Pope Gregory the Great mentions a monastery dedicated to Vitus, located somewhere in or near Sicily ("Epist.", I, xlviii, P.L., LXXXVII, 511).) on the Esquiline Hill in Rome on Sunday, July 31, 768, and summarily appointed him pope. Antipope Philip was not recognized and failed to gain a significant following, so he left the same day and returned to his monastery, where he was never heard from or seen again.

== Carolingian Intervention ==
While Pepin’s previous military campaigns in Italy against Desiderius's Lombard predecessors had been successful, the subsequent relations between the papacy (aligned with the Carolingians) and the Lombards were correspondingly strained and in 773, Pope Hadrian openly broke with king Desiderius. When Desiderius responded by moving against the papal cities, Hadrian immediately appealed to Charlemagne for help against the Lombards. Since the Lombards had blocked the passage through the Alps, Pope Hadrian had to send his embassy by sea; they were commissioned to remind Charlemagne that he was the protector of the papacy.

Originally, Charlemagne had remained on amicable terms with the Lombards, having been married to Desiderius's daughter, Desiderata. (Note: Moreover, Desiderius—in concert with Charlemagne—wanted to ensure there was more than one Carolingian king involved with the papacy and with access to Italy, since the title of patricius Romanorum was shared by both Carloman and Charlemagne (Carloman also controlled Frankish access through the Alps).) Despite not liking the alliance between Lombards and Franks, Stephen III grudgingly maintained positive diplomatic standing with both kings, but his death in February 772 and the elevation of Pope Hadrian, who wished to undermine this relationship, altered the political environment. Hadrian hedged his bets and took measures to provoke Desiderius; actions designed to make him take an aggressive stance against the Holy See so an appeal could be made for Frankish assistance. Upon hearing the call for help, Charlemagne obliged the Holy See. (Note: According to the Annales regni francorum, this legate from the Pope to Charlemagne arrived in 773.) Carloman's death also changed the situation. It seems the widow of Charlemagne’s brother (Carloman) and her children had taken refuge with Desiderius, who—so it was alleged in the Liber Pontificalis—intended to proclaim a Frankish successor. According to historian Roger Collins, the veracity of this claim can be questioned as a possible piece of disinformation from the papacy "intended to ensure the Frankish king’s help against the Lombards."

During the spring of 773, Charlemagne sent two Frankish armies against the Lombards and after an eight month siege, captured the capital of Pavia and Desiderius himself. (Note: The renowned Frankish king also took the city of Pavia, where Desiderius's son Adelchis had taken residence with Carloman's remaining family.) Charlemagne subsequently exiled the Lombard king to the abbey of Corbie in northern France, and as “king of the Franks”, added the title “and of the Lombards”, lengthening his moniker. When Charlemagne took the title rex Langobardorum, it marked the first time a Germanic king adopted the title of a kingdom he had conquered. Although Charlemagne had the power to destroy the Lombards outright, he instead permitted them to "retain their laws and pardoned those who were traitors." In the end, Desiderius's ambitions brought about the end of the Lombard kingdom and he was the final Lombard king on record.

== Family ==
He married Ansa (or Ansia) with whom he had a son and four daughters:

- Anselperga (or Anselberga), abbess of San Salvatore monastery of Brescia
- Adelperga (or Adelberga), married Arechis II of Benevento
- Liutperga (also Liutpirc or Liutberga), married Tassilo III of Bavaria
- Desiderata married Charlemagne in 770 and was repudiated (a medieval form of divorce) in 771.
- Adelchis (or Adalgis), patrician in Constantinople

== Legacy ==
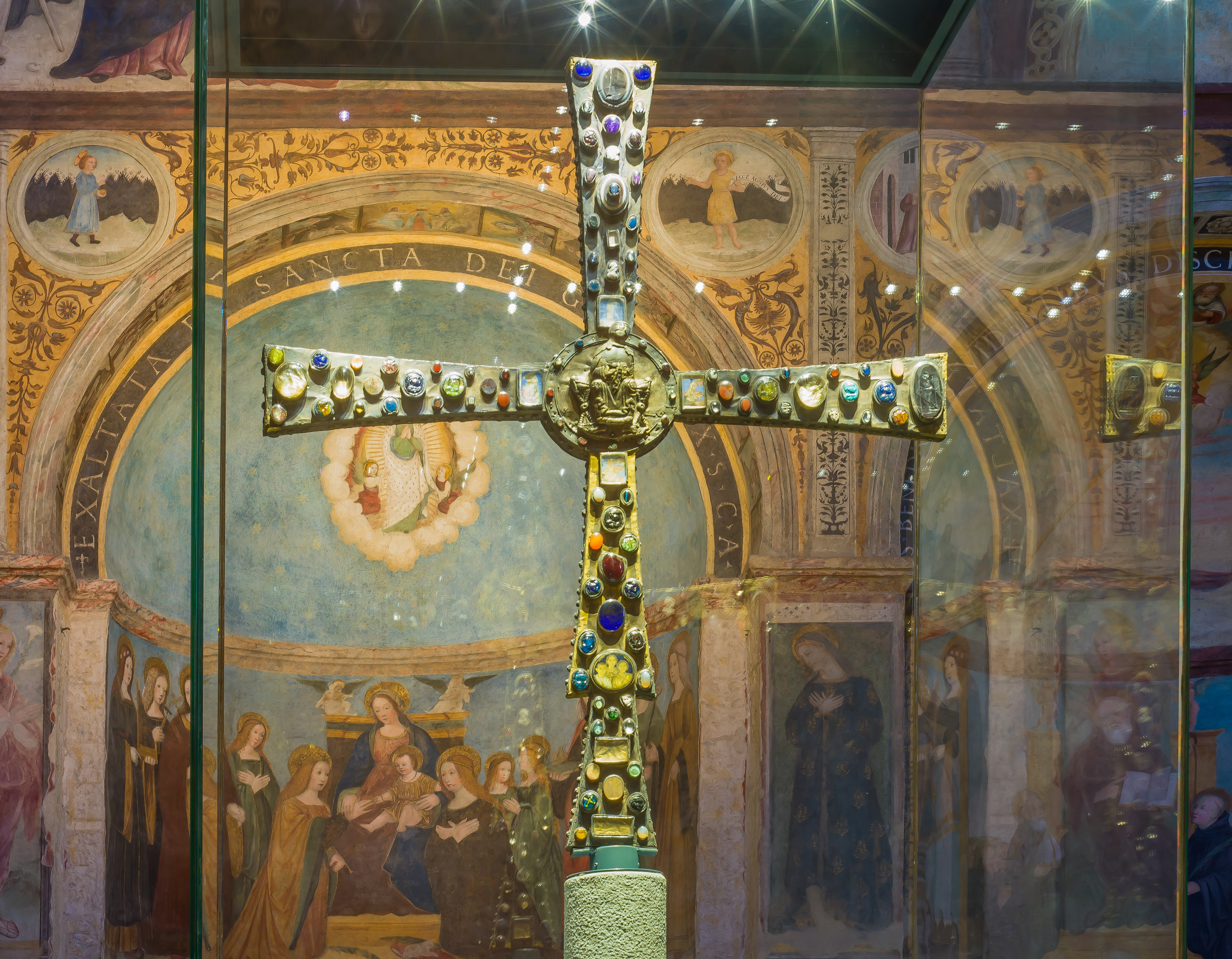
Cross of Desiderius

Today, the legacy of Desiderius still has significance in Italy. The beautiful monastic church of San Salvatore in Brescia, a testament to Lombard architecture still enduring, was constructed by Desiderius. His name in Italian—"Desiderio"—directly translates to "desire" in English. In the tragedy Adelchi, written by renowned Italian novelist and Poet Alessandro Manzoni in 1822, Desiderius is portrayed as vain man, destroying his kingdom and legacy over his desire for power. His son Adelchi (also called Adalgis) is torn over his father's will and his desire for peace, and dies of starvation. In the play, the author expresses regret that Desiderius and the Lombards failed to unite the Italian Peninsula. (Note: Also see: https://www.britannica.com/topic/Adelchi)

== Bibliography ==
- Alighieri, Dante (2007) [1321]. Paradise (Paradiso). Translated by Anthony Esolen. New York: The Modern Library. ISBN 978-0-81297-726-4.
- Bachrach, Bernard; Bachrach, David S. (2017). Warfare in Medieval Europe c.400–c.1453. London and New York: Routledge. ISBN 978-1-13888-765-7.
- Blunsom, E.O. (2013). The Past and Future of Law. Xlibris Corporation. ISBN 978-1-46287-516-0.
- Christie, Neil (1998). The Lombards: The Ancient Longobards. Malden, MA: Blackwell. ISBN 0-631-18238-1.
- Collins, Roger (1999). Early Medieval Europe, 300–1000. New York: St. Martin’s Press. ISBN 978-0-31221-885-0.
- Davis, Jennifer R. (2015). Charlemagne's Practice of Empire. Cambridge and New York: Cambridge University Press. ISBN 978-1-10743-413-4.
- Frassetto, Michael (2003). Encyclopedia of Barbarian Europe: Society in Transformation. Santa Barbara, CA: ABC-CLIO. ISBN 978-1-57607-263-9.
- Fried, Johannes (2015). The Middle Ages. Cambridge and London: The Belknap Press of Harvard University Press. ISBN 978-0-67405-562-9.
- Fried, Johannes (2016). Charlemagne. Cambridge and London: Harvard University Press. ISBN 978-0-67473-739-6.
- Goffart, Walter (2012). The Narrators of Barbarian History (A.D. 550–800): Jordanes, Gregory of Tours, Bede, and Paul the Deacon. Notre Dame, IN: University of Notre Dame Press. ISBN 978-0-26802-967-8.
- James, Edward (1995). "The Northern World in the Dark Ages, 400–900". In George Holmes (ed.). The Oxford History of Medieval Europe. New York: Oxford University Press. ISBN 978-0-19280-133-3.
- Koenigsberger, H.G (1987). Medieval Europe, 400–1500. Essex: Longman. ISBN 0-582-49403-6.
- Lewis, David L. (2009). God's Crucible: Islam and the Making of Europe, 570–1215. New York: W.W. Norton. ISBN 978-0-39306-790-3.
- McKitterick, Rosamond (2001). The Early Middle Ages: Europe, 400–1000. Oxford and New York: Oxford University Press. ISBN 978-0-19873-172-6.
- McKitterick, Rosamond (2008). Charlemagne: The Formation of a European Identity. New York: Cambridge University Press. ISBN 978-0-521-71645-1.
- Nelson, Janet L. (1998). "Making a Difference in Eighth-Century Politics: The Daughters of Desiderius". In Murray, Alexander Callander (ed.). After Rome's Fall: Narrators and Sources of Early Medieval History. Toronto: University of Toronto Press. pp. 171–190. ISBN 0-8020-0779-1.
- Noble, Thomas F.X. (1984). The Republic of St. Peter: The Birth of the Papal State, 680–825. Philadelphia: University of Pennsylvania Press. ISBN 0-8122-1239-8.
- Reardon, Wendy J. (2015). The Deaths of the Popes. Comprehensive Accounts Including Funerals, Burial Places and Epitaphs. Jefferson, NC and London: McFarland. ISBN 978-0-78646-116-5.
- Riché, Pierre (1993). The Carolingians: A Family Who Forged Europe. Translated by Michael Idomir Allen. Philadelphia: University of Pennsylvania Press. ISBN 978-0-81221-342-3.

Regnal titles
Preceded by Aistulf	King of the Lombards; 756–774	Succeeded by Charlemagne
Preceded by Alboin	Duke of Spoleto; 758–759	Succeeded by Gisulf
