= Diptych of Boethius =

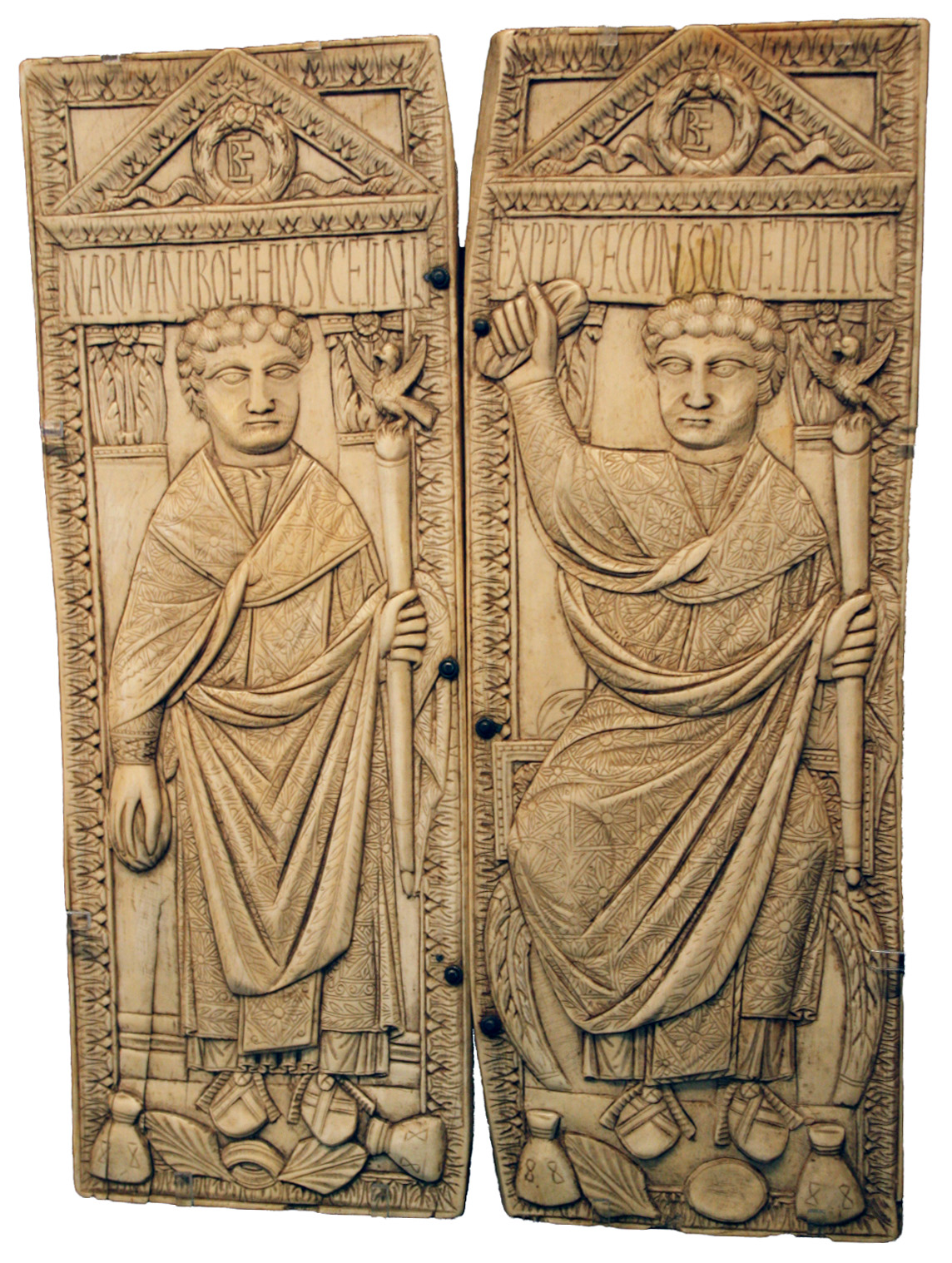
- Year: 5th century
- Type: Diptych
- Medium: Ivory
- Dimensions: 24 cm × 18 cm × 2 cm (9.4 in × 7.1 in × 0.79 in)
- Location: Museo di Santa Giulia; Brescia

The Diptych of Boethius is an ivory consular diptych (24 cm × 18 cm × 2 cm; 9.45 in × 7.09 in × 0.79 in), which dates from the end of the fifth century AD and is conserved in the Museo di Santa Giulia in Brescia.

Acquired by Cardinal Angelo Maria Querini during the eighteenth century, the work passed to the Museo dell'Era Cristiana in his will.

== History ==
The piece was made by Roman artisans to celebrate Manlius Boethius' second appointment as praefectus urbi of Rome in 487. The purpose of the work was purely commemorative - diptychs of this type were commissioned in order to be donated to friends and intimates on the occasion of important events, such as the appointment to important public offices.

Initially displayed in the Museo dell'Era Cristiana, which was opened in some rooms of the suppressed Monastery of Santa Giulia, at the beginning of the nineteenth century, it remained there for some time. With the opening of the Museo di Santa Giulia in 1998, the diptych became part of the "Collectables and applied arts" collection and is found in the vitrines dedicated to the Querini collection.

== Description and style ==
The diptych shows the consul on both panels, seated on a throne and wearing a toga picta — a long, folded scarf arranged by a complex protocol.

In both depictions, his left hand holds a scepter with an eagle surmounting a globe, while his right hand holds handkerchief (mappa circensis) used to begin the consul sponsored games. In both panels, with money bags at his feet are evidence of his munificence. In the image above, the left panel has the consul standing, while on the right panel, he sits on a curial chair.

The dedicatory inscription on the second tablet records the event being celebrated, which therefore allows the work to be dated: EX P(raefecto) P(raetorio) P(raefectus) U(rbi) SEC(undo) CONS(ul) ORD(inarius) ET PATRIC(ius) "From the Praetorian Prefect, Praefectus Urbi for the second time, ordinary Consul and patrician." The inscription on the first tablet identifies the person being commemorated as Manlius Boethius.

The work shows signs of final decoration with a burin which was able to produce the different depths of relief (the sceptres, the figure of Boethius, the architecture in the background) and to create the light but plentiful embroidery of the tunics.

== See also ==
- Diptych of the Lampadii

== Bibliography ==
- Renata Stradiotti (ed.), San Salvatore - Santa Giulia a Brescia. Il monastero nella storia, Skira, Milano 2001
