= Pietro Ricchi =

Italian painter

Pietro Ricchi (1606 – 15 August 1675) was an Italian painter of the Baroque period, born in Lucca.

== Life ==
Pietro Ricchi, called il Lucchese, trained from 1620 to 1623 with Domenico Crespi, called Passignano, in Florence and from 1624 to 1627 with Guido Reni in Bologna. Ricchi presumably spent two years in Rome before traveling to France to paint frescos. For several years he moved between Aix-en-Provence, Arles, Lyon and Paris. In 1632–33, he painted a fresco the rooms of Fléchères castle. He left France following a duel.

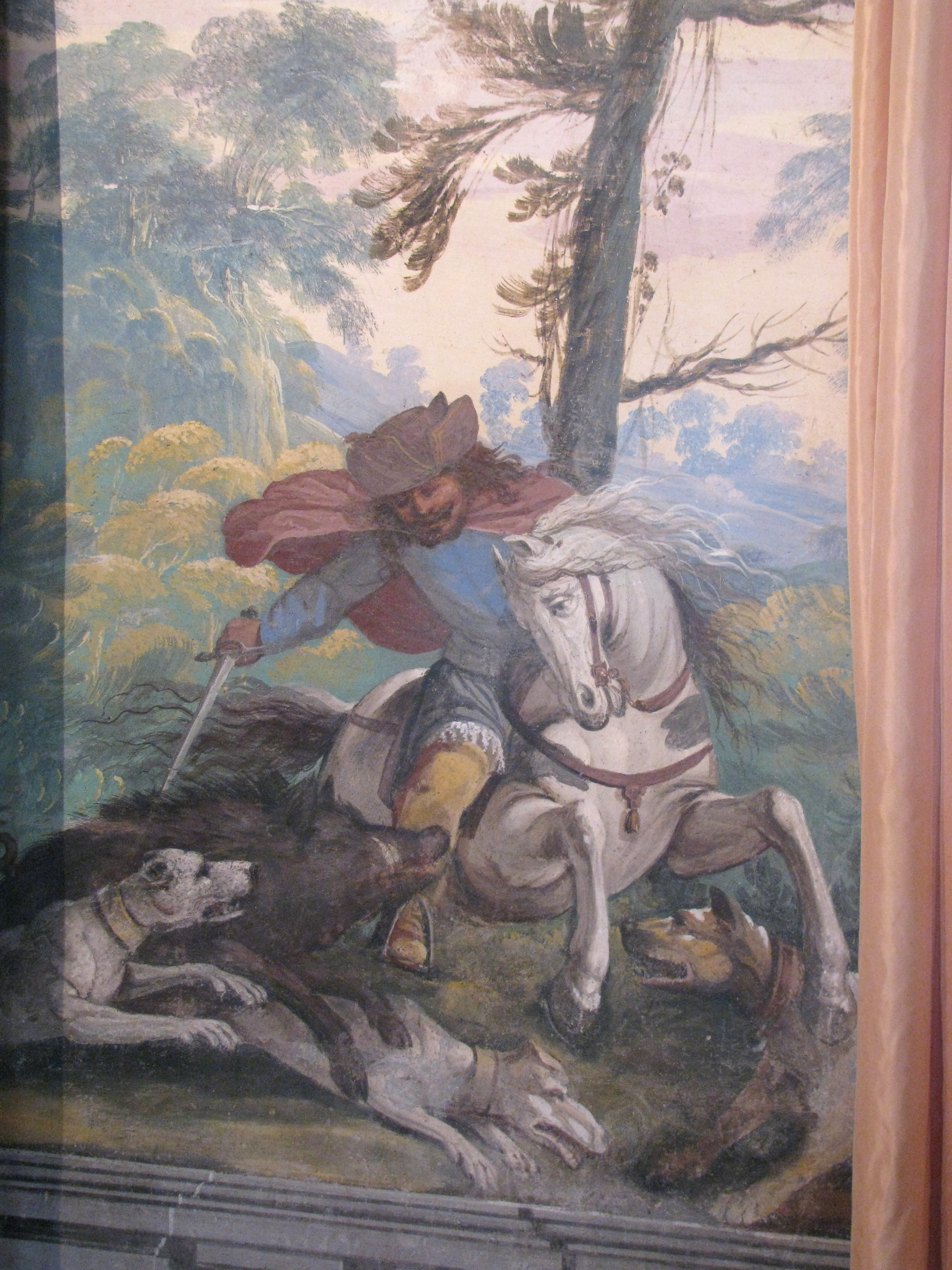
'Salon de la Chasse' : boar hunt

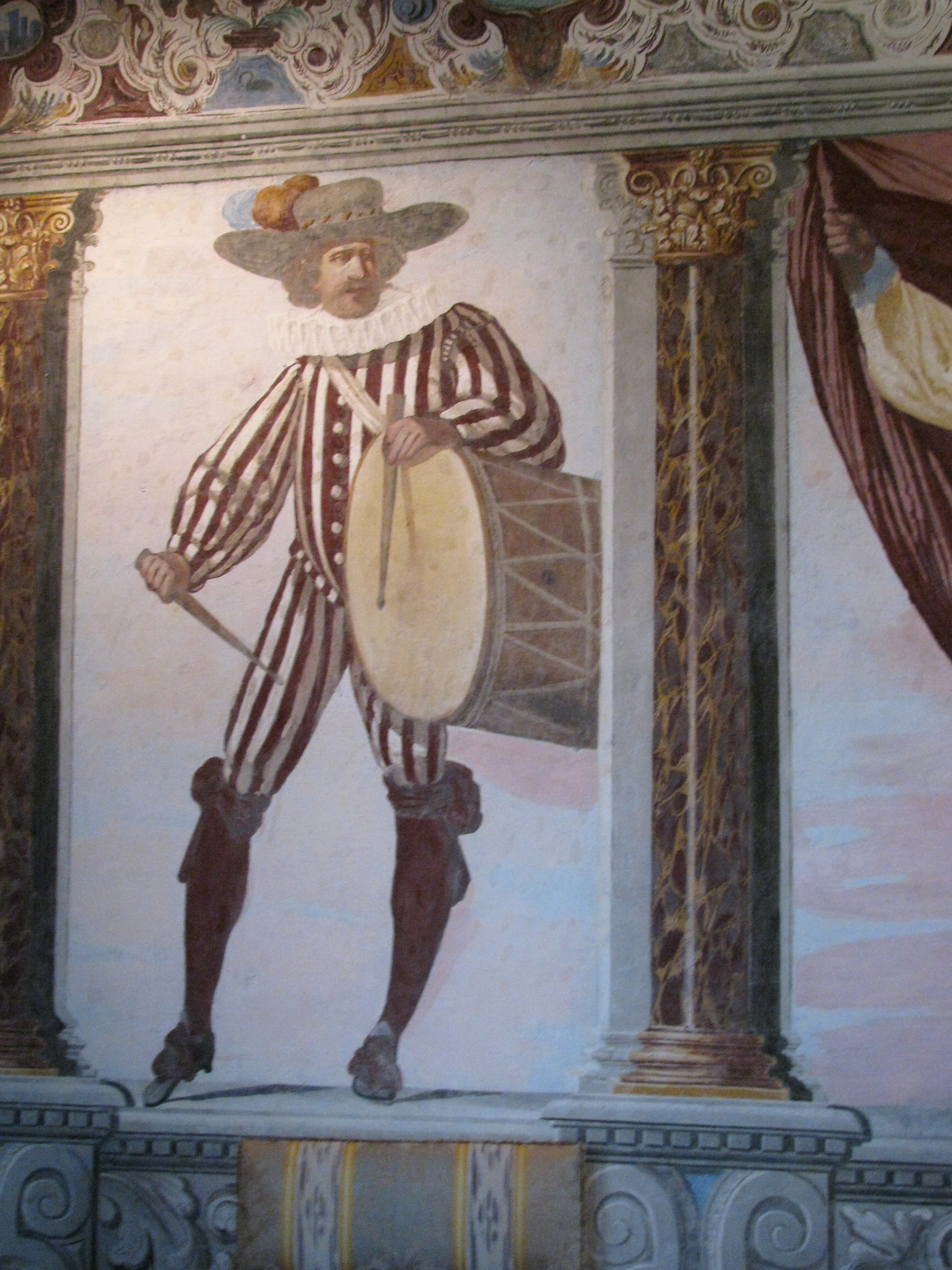
'Chambre de la Parade' : Drummer

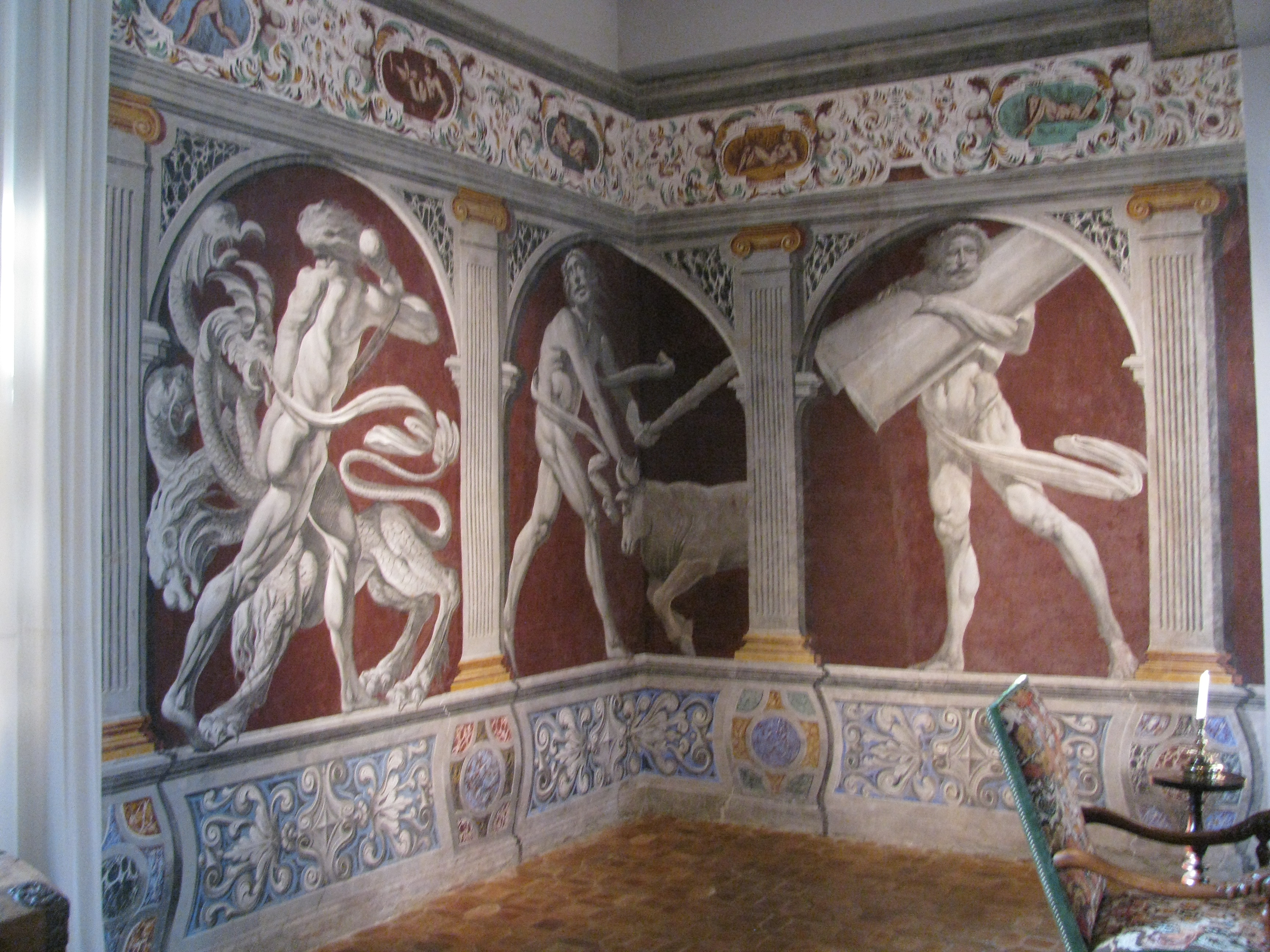
Labours of Hercules room

He traveled widely thorough Northern Italy. In 1634 he went to Milan. He painted an altarpiece for the church of San Francesco in Lucca. He spent the years 1635 to 1652 in Brescia, where he lived in the parish of Santi Faustino e Giovita. Here he produced many of his fresco and oil paintings. From Brescia he took commissions for Bergamo, Verona and Trento. He also decorated the church of San Francesco, Brescia. Francesco Monti (il Brescianino) studied under Ricchi.

Ricchi moved to Venice in 1652, where he painted Faith for the choir area of Madonna dell'Orto.

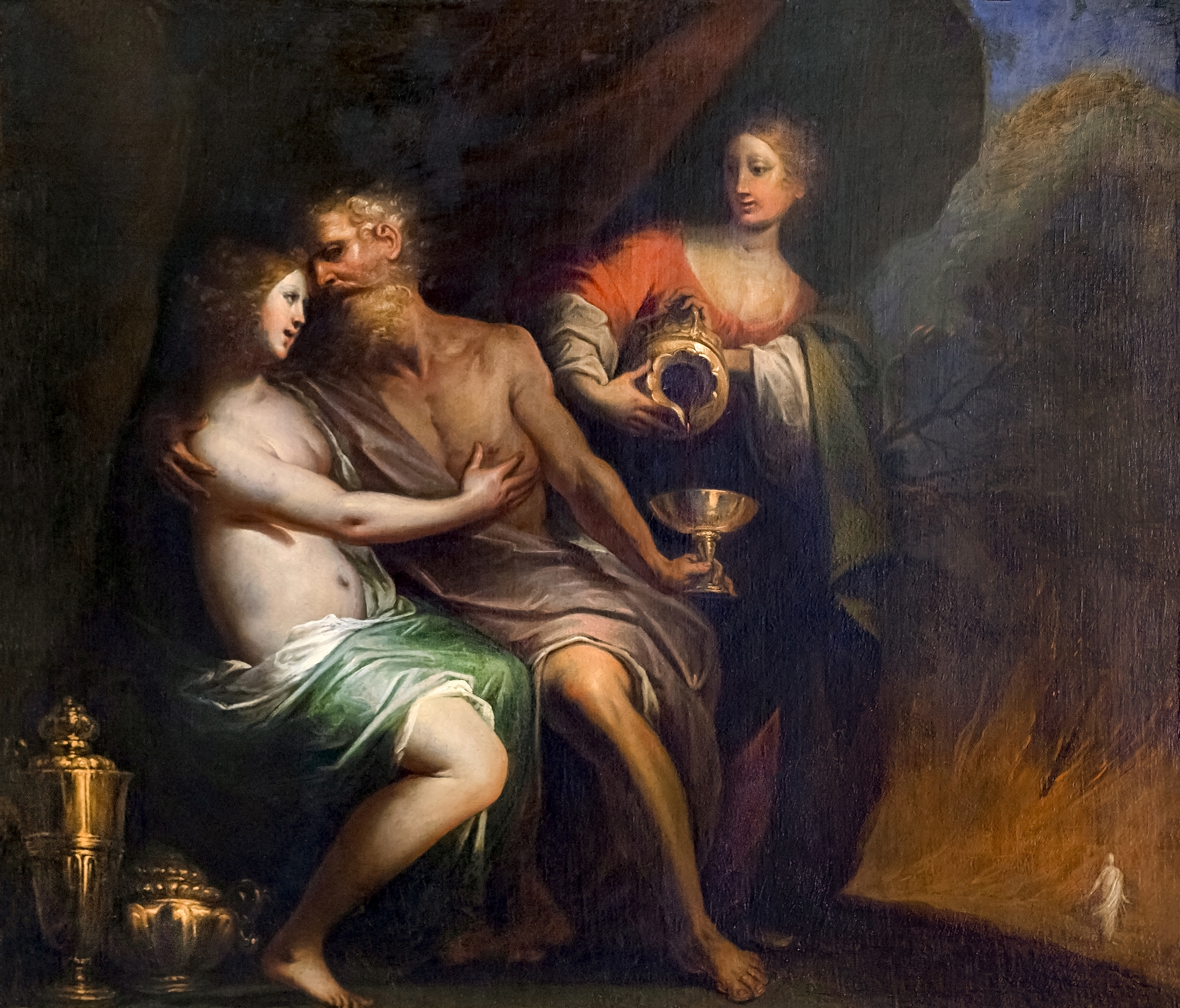
Lot and his daughters
Ca' Rezzonico Venice

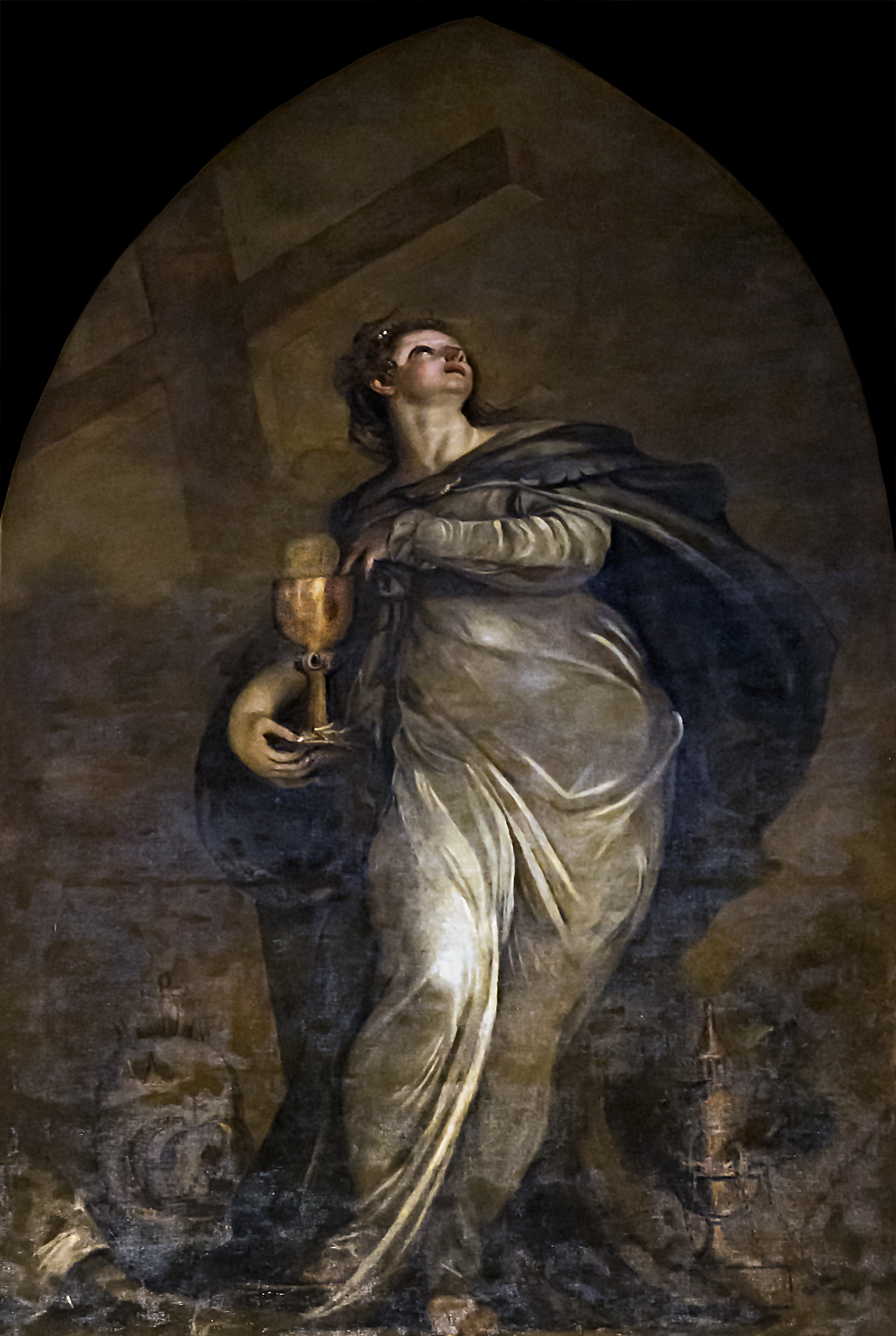
The Faith - Madonna dell'Orto Venice

Ricchi spent his final years from 1670 in Udine, where he died in 1675.

== Other works ==
- Last Supper (1644), Museo Civico, Riva del Garda
- Judith and Holofernes, Buonconsiglio Castle
- Madonna and Saints, Diocesan Museum of Brescia
- Adoration of the Magi (1660), Indianapolis Museum of Art

== Sources ==
- Farquhar, Maria (1855). Ralph Nicholson Wornum (ed.). Biographical catalogue of the principal Italian painters. London: Woodfall & Kinder. p. 144.
