= Brescianino =

Brescianino (= person from Brescia, Italy) has been given as a nickname to:

== Painters ==
- Giovita Brescianino
- Francesco Monti (il Brescianino) (1646–1712)
- Andrea Piccinelli or Andrea del Brescianino, or simply Il Brescianino, Sienese painter
- Raffaello Piccinelli or Raffaello del Brescianino, Sienese painter, brother of the above
