= San Salvatore, Brescia =

Museum and former monastery in Brescia, Lombardy, northern Italy

San Salvatore-Santa Giulia
UNESCO World Heritage Site
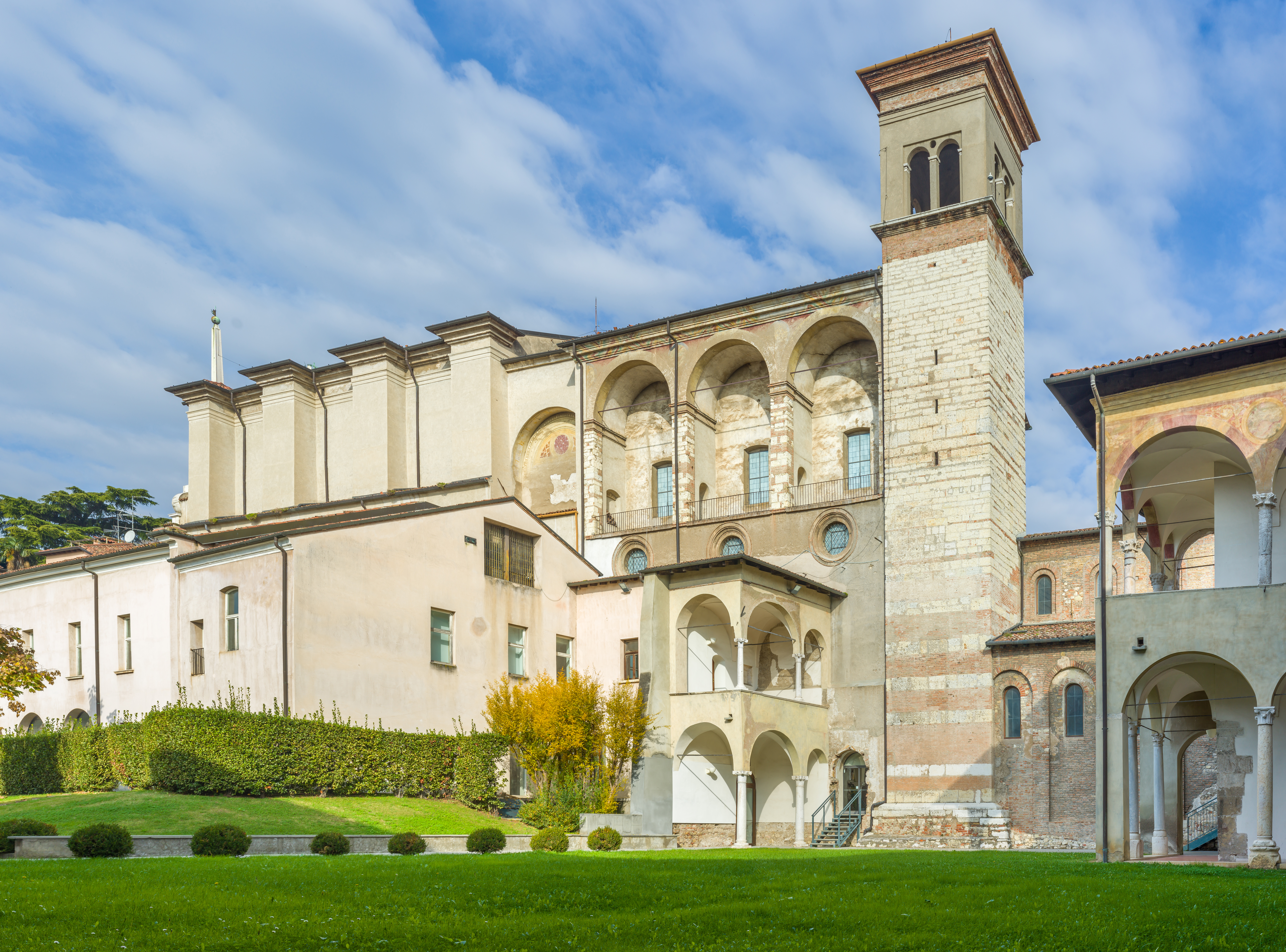
- The Santa Giulia (left) and San Salvatore churches in the Santa Giulia museal complex.

- Location within Italy
- Official name: The monumental area with the monastic complex of San Salvatore-Santa Giulia
- Location: Brescia, Italy
- Part of: Longobards in Italy: Places of Power (568–774 A.D.)
- Criteria: Cultural: (ii), (iii), (vi)
- Reference: 1318-002
- Inscription: 2011 (35th Session)
- Coordinates: 45°32′23″N 10°13′41″E

San Salvatore (or, for most of its existence, Santa Giulia) is a former monastery in Brescia, Lombardy, northern Italy, now turned into a museum. The monastic complex is famous for the diversity of its architecture which includes Roman remains and significant pre-Romanesque, Romanesque and Renaissance buildings.

In 2011, it became a UNESCO World Heritage Site as part of a group of seven inscribed as Longobards in Italy: Places of Power (568–774 A.D.).

The monastery is traditionally considered the place where Desiderata, wife of Charlemagne and daughter of the Lombard King Desiderius, spent her exile after the annulment of her marriage in 771.

== History ==
San Salvatore was founded in 753 by Desiderius, future king of the Lombards, and his wife Ansa, as a female monastery, his daughter Anselperga becoming the first abbess. After the Lombard defeat by Charlemagne, San Salvatore maintained its privileges as a royal institution and enlarged its possessions.

Alfred the Great visited this monastery when he went to Rome in the 850s. He later founded his own monastery for nuns at Shaftesbury Abbey in Dorset, putting his own daughter in charge; although there is no clear evidence, it is possible he took this monastery as his inspiration.

In the 12th century most of the edifices were rebuilt or restored in the Romanesque style, and the oratory of Santa Maria in Solario was erected. In the 15th century, all the structures were again restored and a dormitory was added. In 1599 the church of Santa Giulia was finished.

The monastery was suppressed in 1798 after the French invasion of Lombardy and turned into barracks. It remained in poor condition until 1882, when it became a Museum of the Christian Age; the decay was however not totally halted before 1966, with a general restoration and the creation of a new Museum of Santa Giulia.

== Overview ==
The monastery complex includes:

- The Basilica of San Salvatore, dating from around the 9th century. It has a nave and two apses and is located over a pre-existing church, which had a single nave and three apses, and in turn was built over a Roman edifice dating from the 1st century BC, destroyed in the 5th century AD. The bell tower, built in the 13th-14th century, has frescoes by Romanino. The interior of the basilica houses frescoes by Paolo da Cailina the Younger, as well as others from the Carolingian age. The presbytery (converted in the 16th century) is a former nuns' choir built in 1466.
- The Oratory of Santa Maria in Solario, added in the 12th century. It has a square plan with an octagonal lantern and small arched loggia. The central pillar supporting the vault of the ground floor uses a Roman altar to the Sun as its base - while there are other examples of Roman stonework being recycled in the building of this structure it may be that this particular case was intentional as the writing is displayed in its correct orientation (unlike at least one example on the outside south wall of the structure). The second floor is decorated with scenes of the life of Jesus.
- The 16th-century church of Santa Giulia (which now serves as the museum conference centre).
- The museum holds ancient finds dating from the Bronze Age to Roman times, with some very interesting Iron Age pieces. Among them are the 4th-century ivory Brescia Casket, and the Diptych of Boethius. There is also a plan probably showing the appearance of the Roman centre of Brixia at the time of Emperor Vespasian. The medieval section of the museum houses a processional cross alleged to have belonged to Desiderius (but which is likely slightly later). There are also architectural remnants from local buildings now destroyed, such as frescoes from the city's Broletto, a statue of St. Faustine and a fresco cycle by Moretto da Brescia.

Also visible in the complex are some Roman houses (domus), excavated beneath the former nuns' vegetable garden.

== Gallery ==
=== San Salvatore complex ===
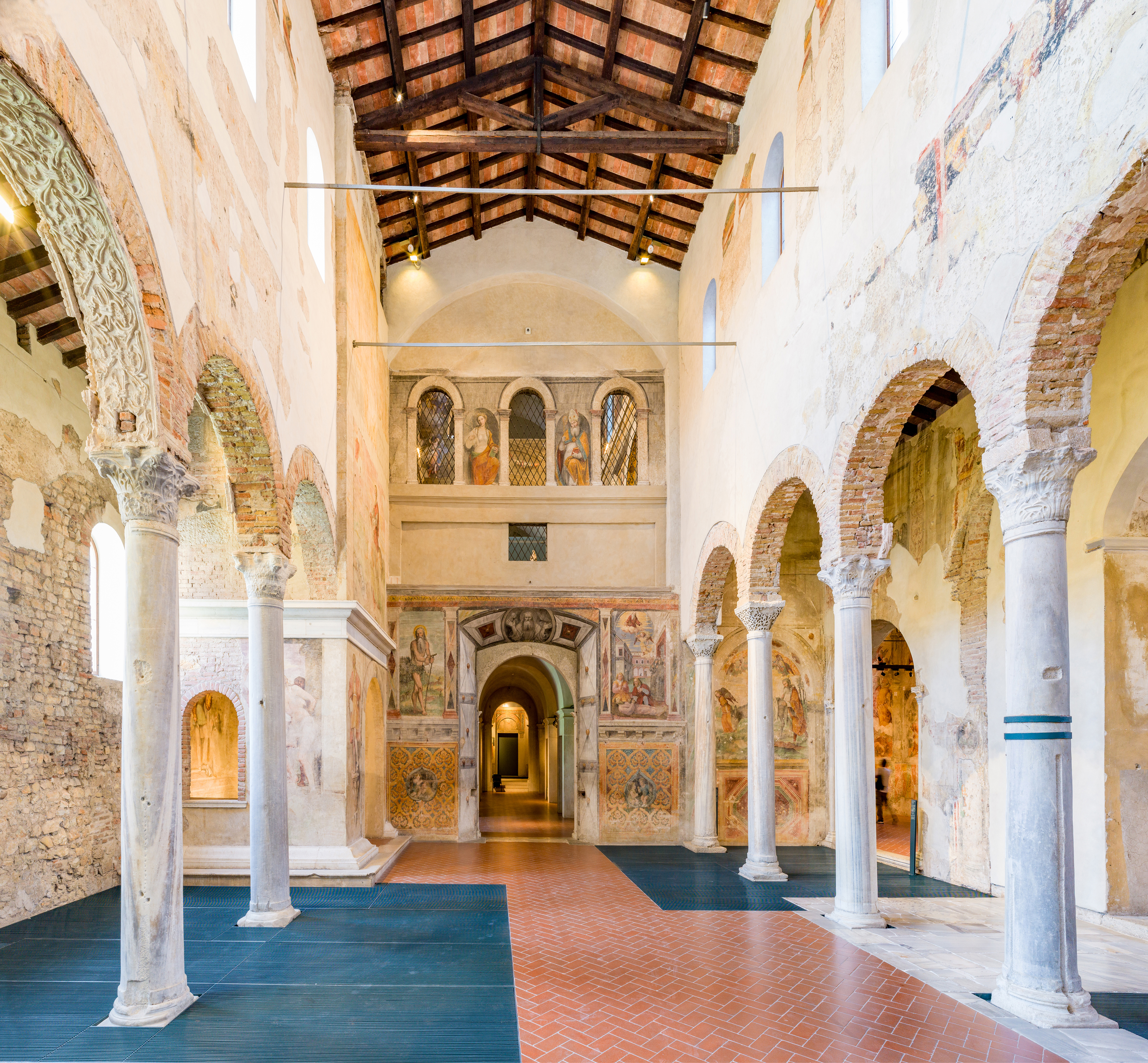
San Salvatore interior

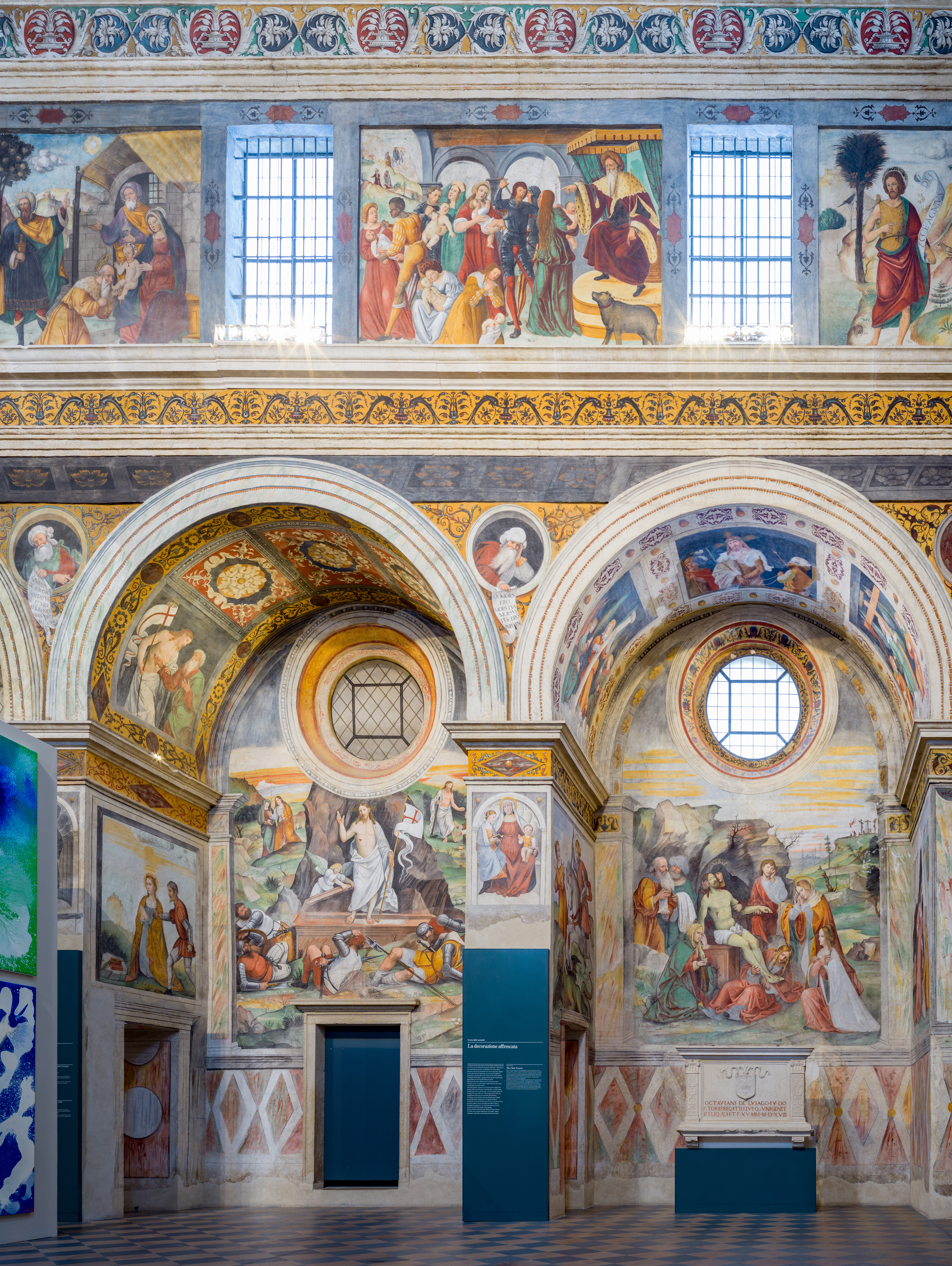
Nuns' choir frescoes

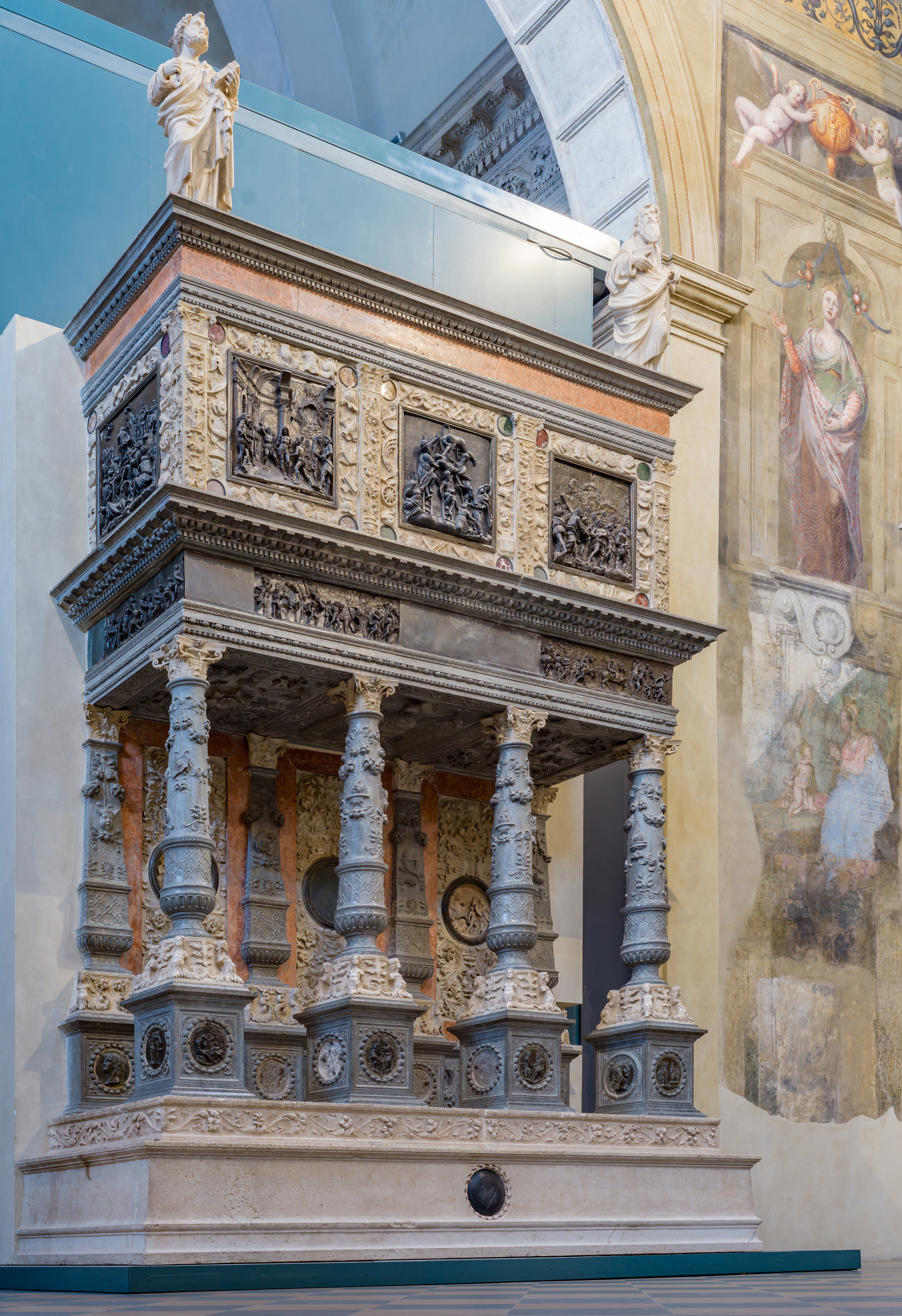
Martinengo cenotaph

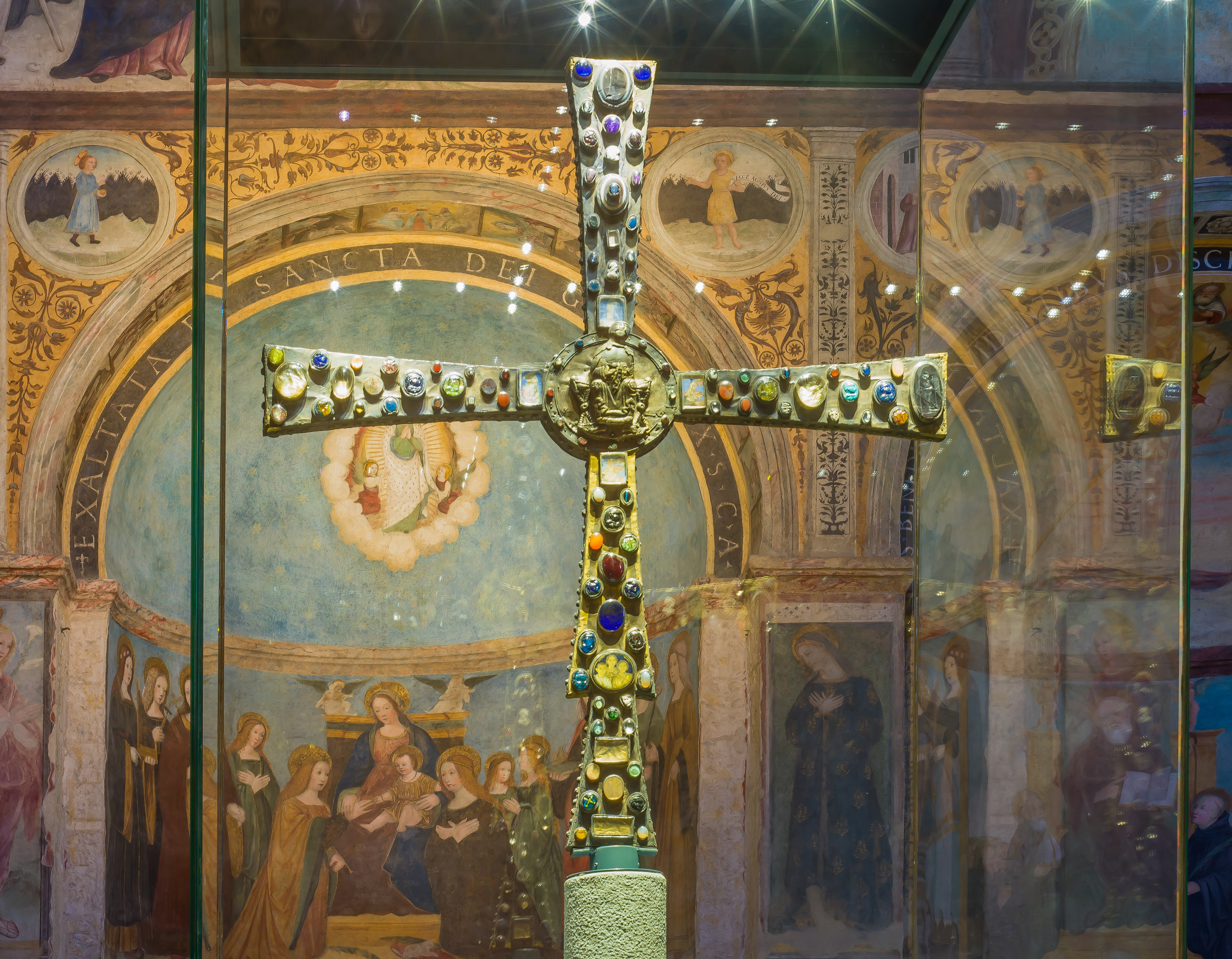
Cross of Desiderius

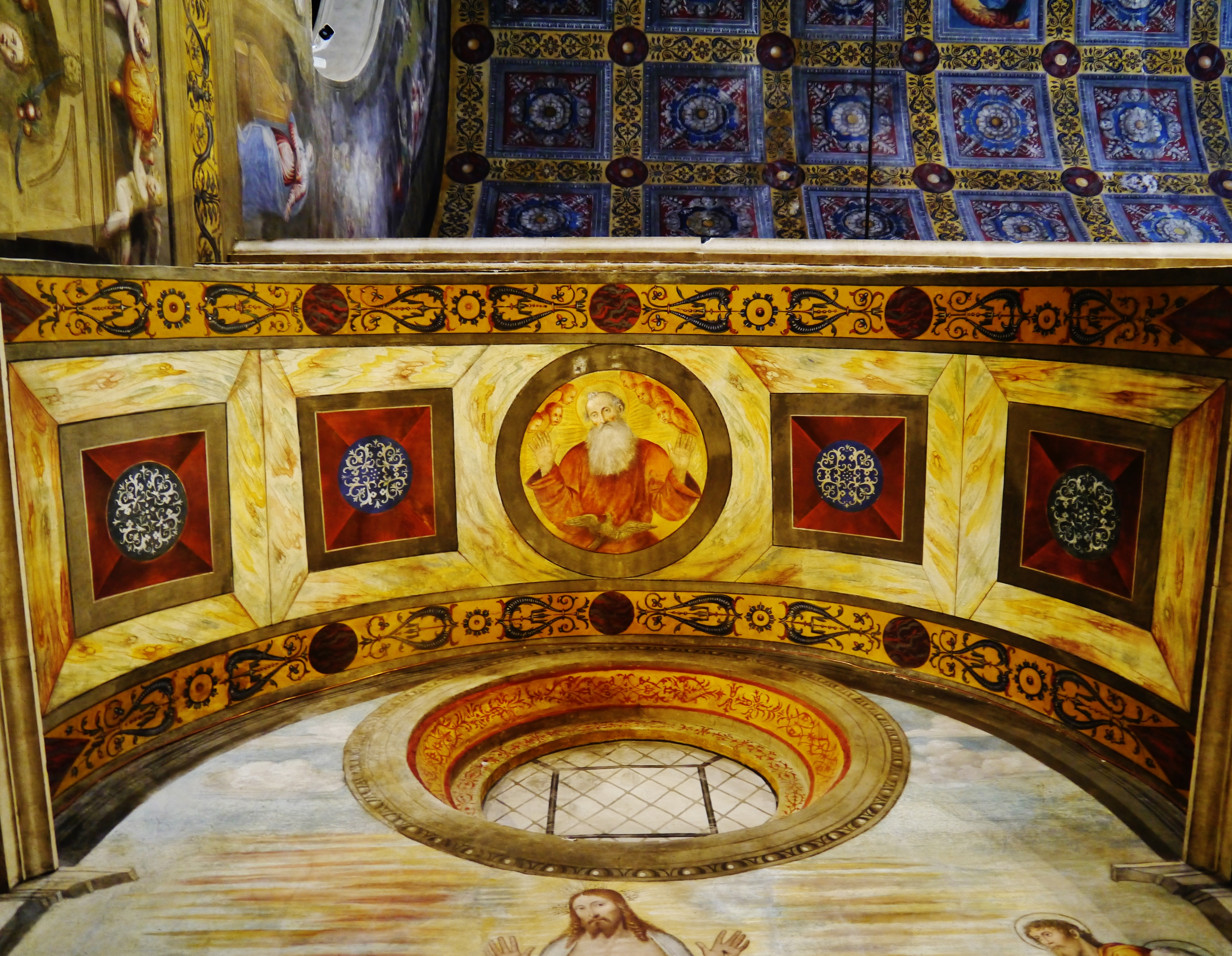
Nuns' choir frescoes

=== Santa Giulia Museum ===
Domus dell'Ortaglia, remains of a group of ancient Roman domus

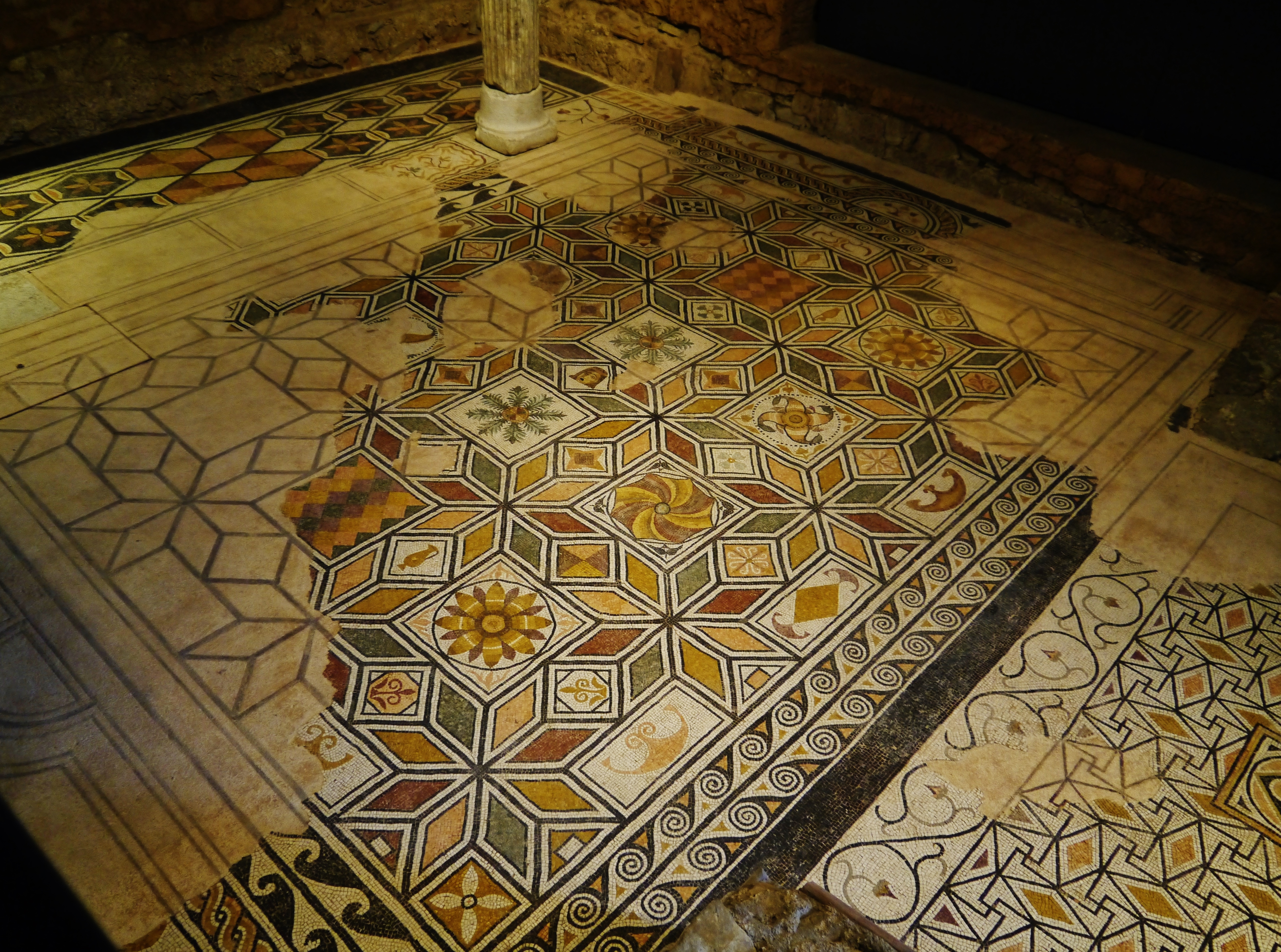
Roman mosaics

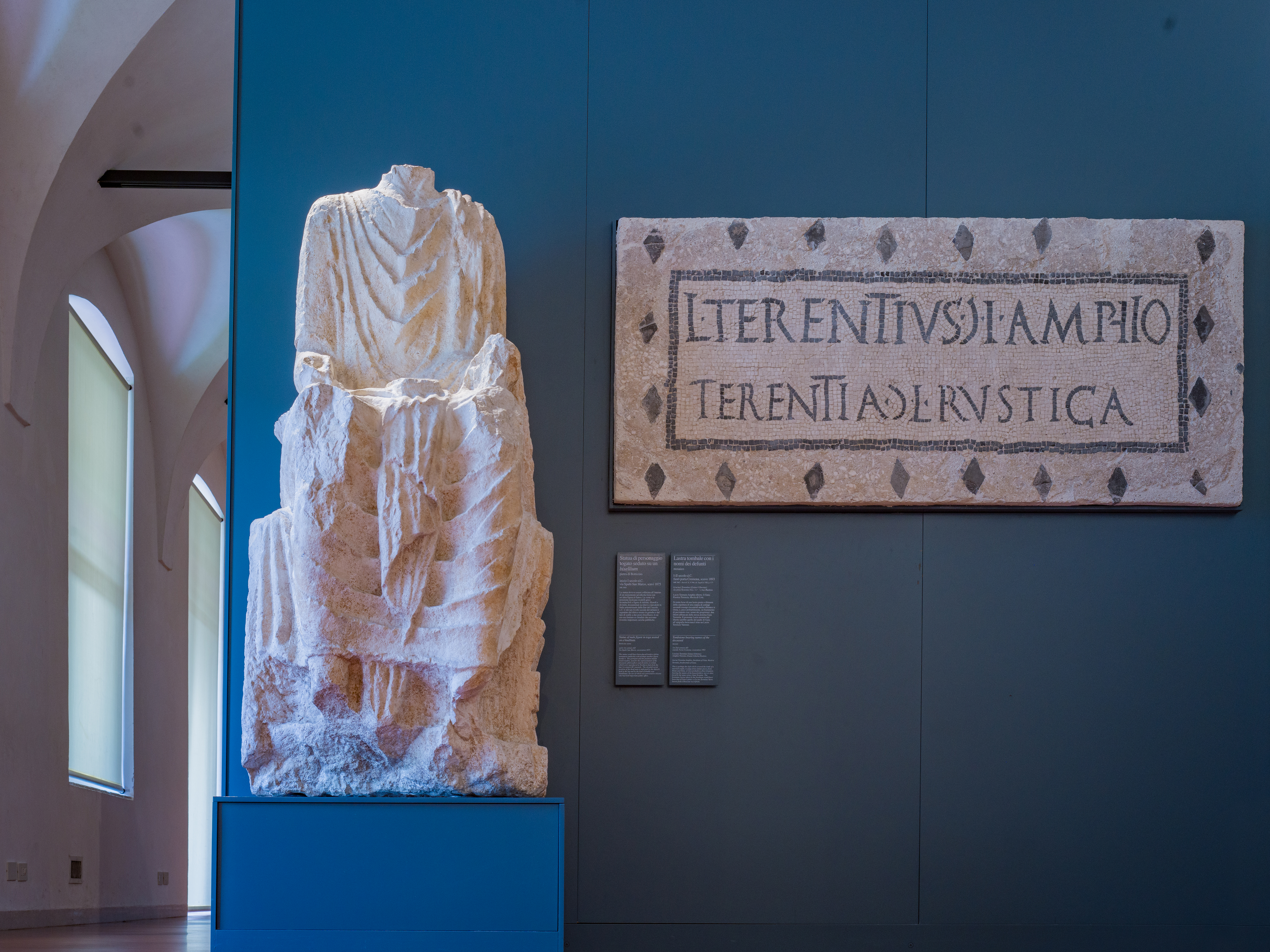
Roman statue with inscription (1st century AD)

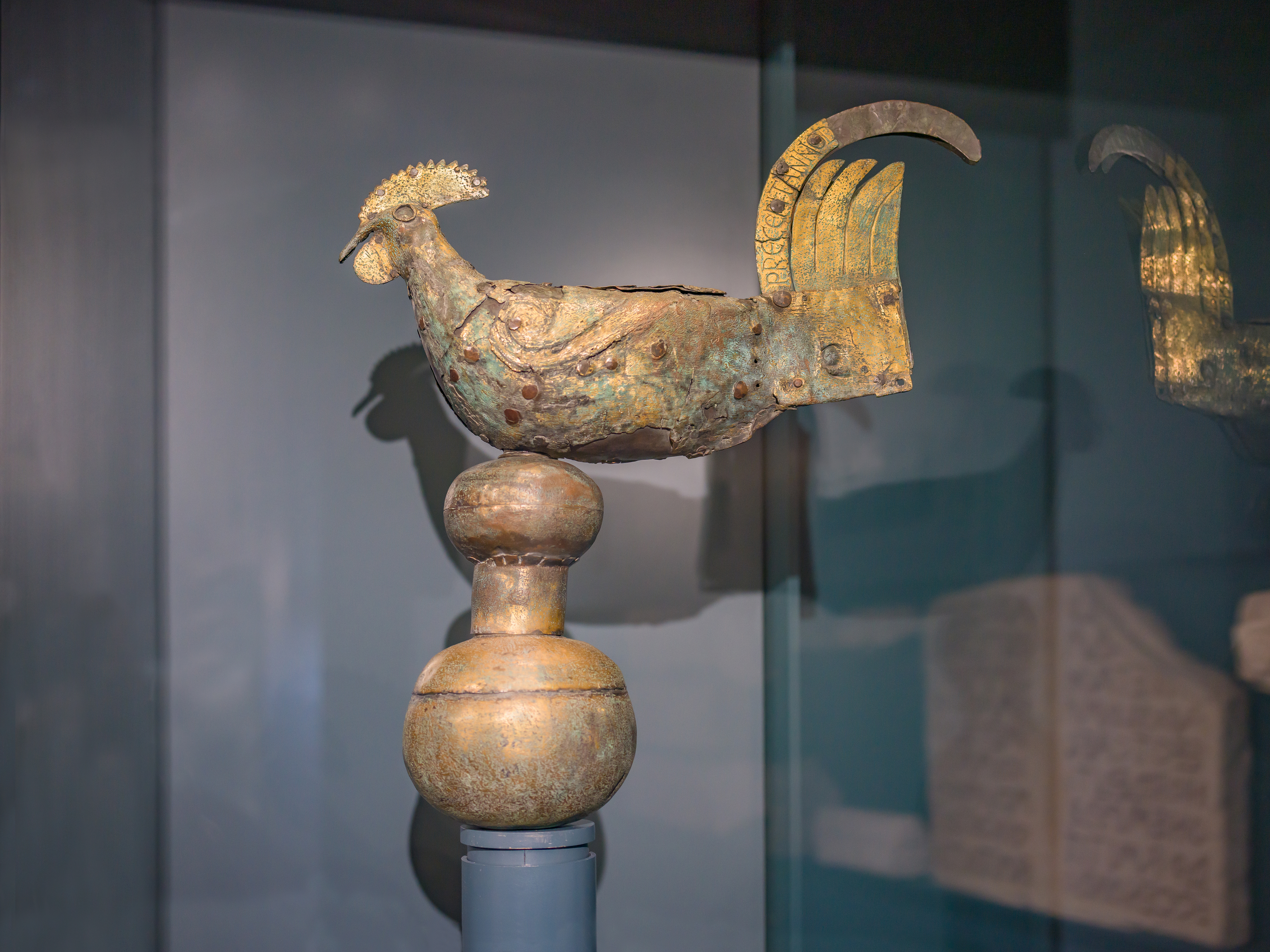
Lombard gilded weather vane also known as Gallo di Ramperto (820 AD)

=== Exterior ===
Northern cloister

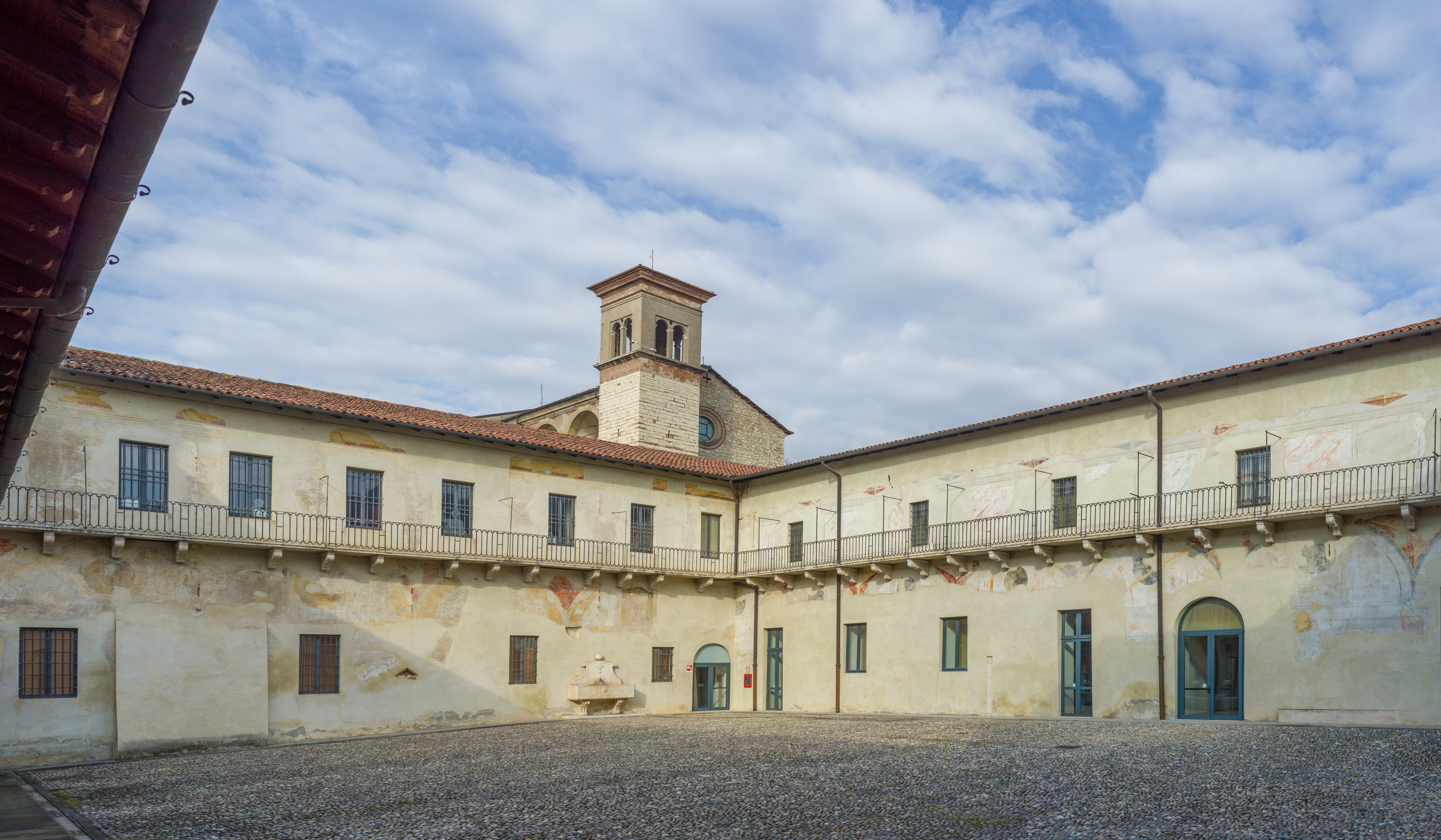
Southeastern cloister

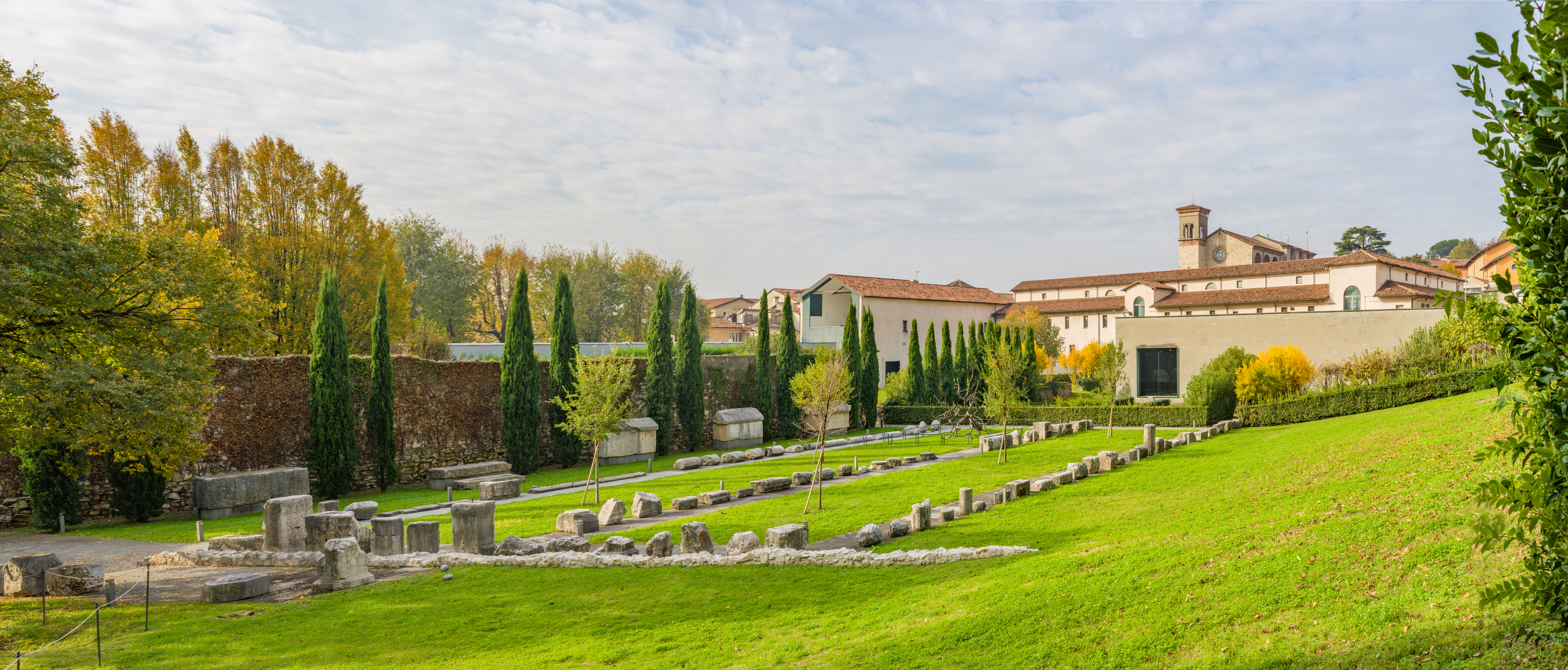
Roman archeological park
