= Christ Carrying the Cross (Romanino) =

Oil painting by Romanino

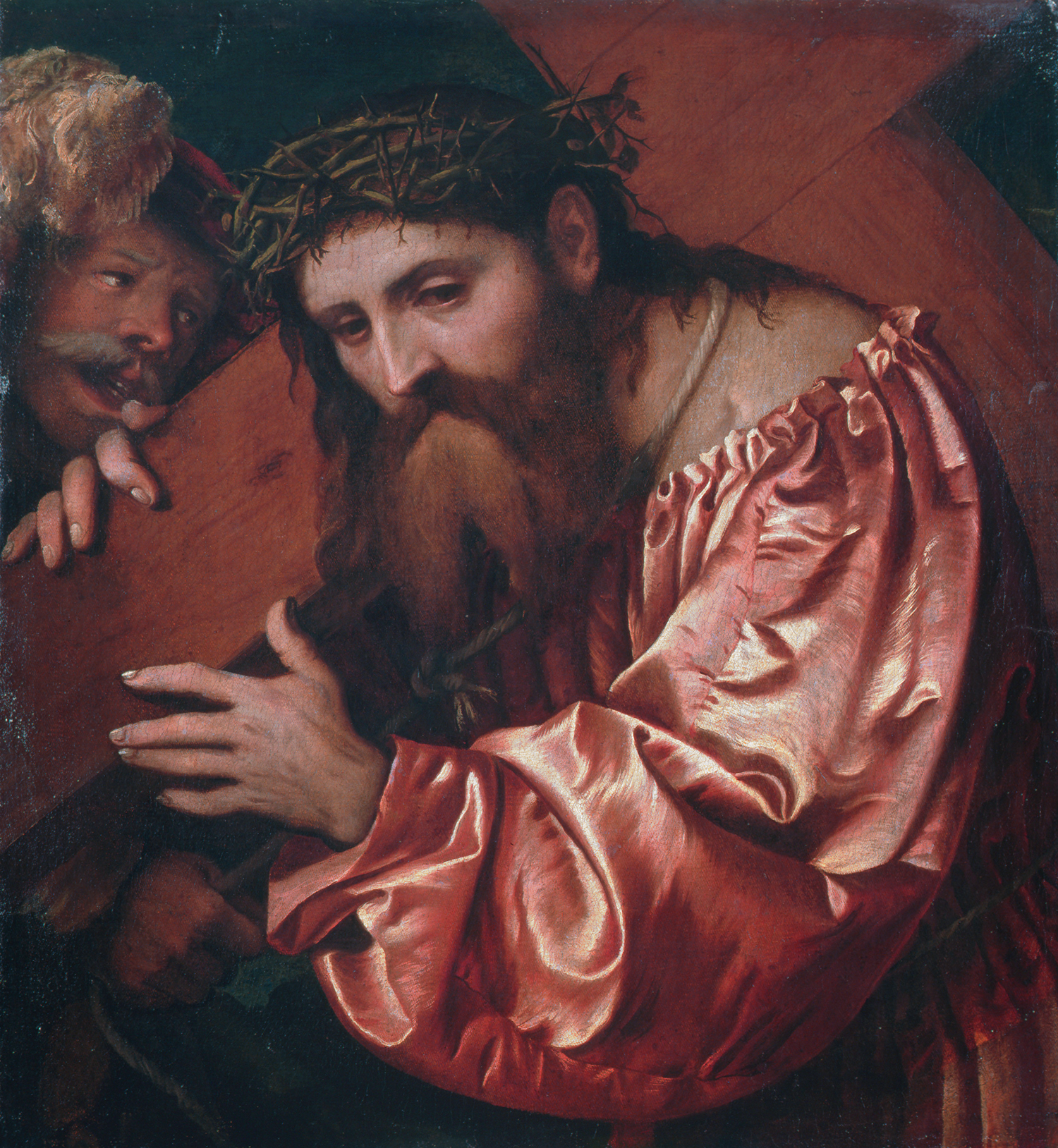
- Artist: Romanino

Christ Carrying the Cross is an oil painting on canvas (81 x 72 cm) by Romanino, datable to around 1540-1550, formerly in the Pinacoteca di Brera in Milan and now in the Alana collection.

== History ==
The subject of the cross-bearing Christ, derived from northern art, was taken up by Giorgione and then had extraordinary success in the Veneto area and northern Italy in general, practiced by Giovanni Bellini, Titian, Lorenzo Lotto, and many others. In the Lombard area it was depicted by Andrea Solario, Bernardino Luini, and Giampietrino.

The painting has been known since 1853 when it was described in the Averoldi collection in Brescia. It then passed to Cristoforo Benigno Crespi and was put up for auction in Paris with the rest of his collection in 1913, when it was purchased by the Jewish collector Federico Gentili di Giuseppe, from whom it was taken in 1941. Romanino's work, along with 70 other works of art from Gentili di Giuseppe's collection, was in fact requisitioned by the pro-Nazi Vichy government and auctioned at the Hôtel Drouot, ending up in a private Milanese collection and finally being purchased by the Pinacoteca in 1998, for 800 million liras.

Gentili di Giuseppe's heirs who survived deportation to the Nazi death camps, almost all of whom now reside in Canada and the United States, had previously requested the return of the painting, but the management of the Pinacoteca, despite being aware of the fraudulent origin of its ownership, had categorically refused their requests.

In 2011 the painting was loaned by the Pinacoteca di Brera, in a group of about 50 works of art, to the Mary Brogan Museum of Art and Science in Tallahassee, Florida. An employee of the well-known auction house Christie's, who learned of the matter, informed one of the great-grandchildren of the original owner, who filed a complaint with the U.S. police authorities, who ordered the museum not to return the painting until the investigation was completed. The matter ended on April 18, 2012, with the return of the painting to the heirs of Federico Gentili di Giuseppe, after a federal court ordered its return to them, no opposition having been received from the Italian government or the Brera Art Gallery.

On June 7, 2012, the canvas was finally auctioned at Christie's in New York for $4,562,500, equivalent to about 3,650,000 euros, the highest amount ever achieved at auction by a Romanino painting. However, the nationality of the buyer was not initially disclosed.

Finally it entered the Alana collection in New York.

== Description and style ==
The iconography involved a fairly narrow cut on the half-figure of Christ, with the cross on his shoulder and the dark background, surrounded by thugs. The devotional function imposed a tight confrontation between the melancholically sorrowful figure of Christ, patiently but painfully suffering martyrdom, and the violent grimaces of the torturers.

Romanino gave the subject an intense and serious interpretation, focusing on Christ's expression, silent and absorbed in his solitary suffering. Entirely in the background appears the gesture of the executioner who with a rope drags Jesus through the noose around his neck. Attention is especially catalyzed by the extraordinary piece of the thick silk sleeve, an homage to the painting of Savoldo, another master of the Brescian Renaissance.

== Bibliography ==
- L Baini (2004). Brera, guida alla pinacoteca (in Italian). Milan: Electa. ISBN 978-88-370-2835-0.
