= The Feast in the House of Simon the Pharisee (Romanino) =

Painting by Girolamo Romani

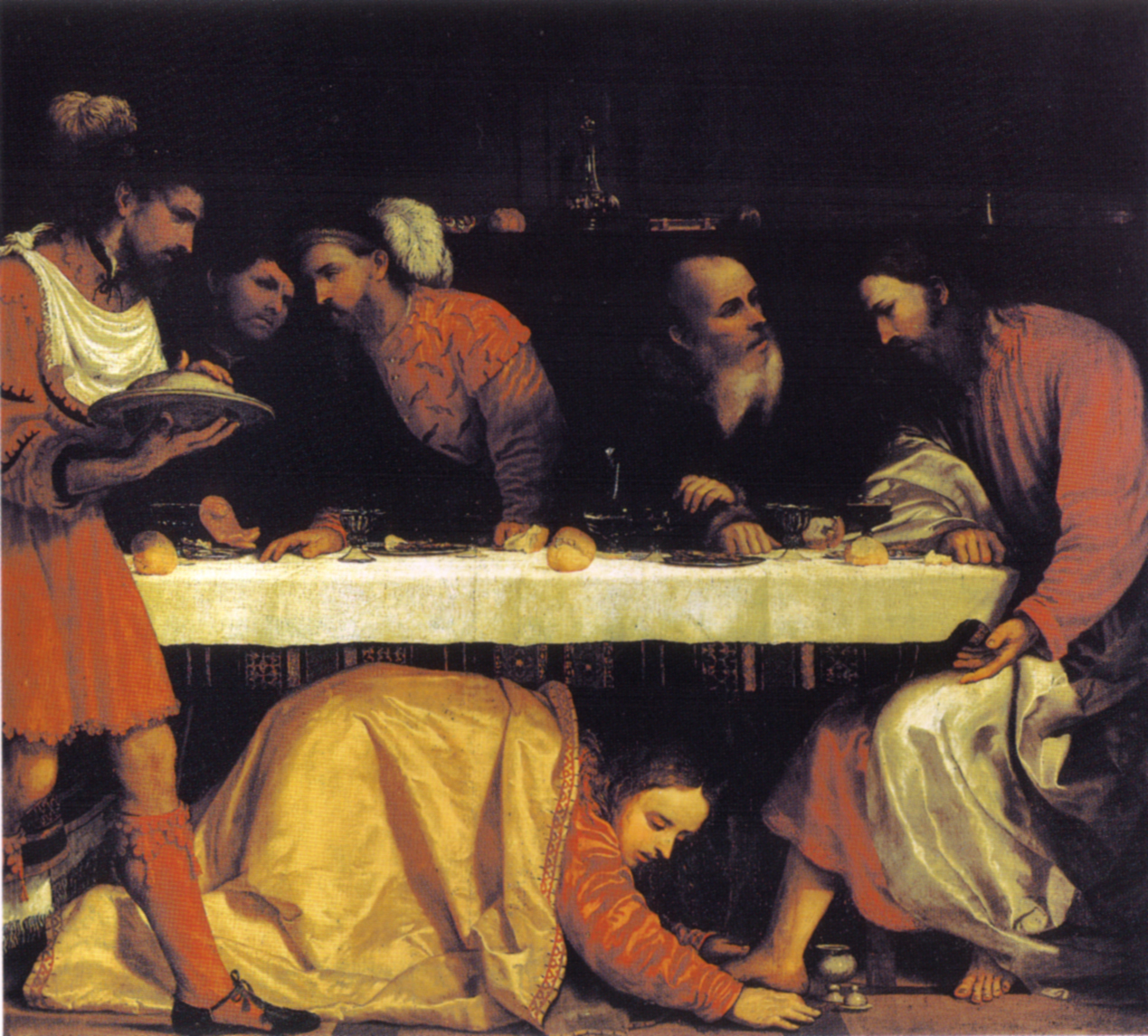

The Feast in the House of Simon the Pharisee is a c. 1545 is an oil on canvas painting by Romanino, now in the church of San Giovanni Evangelista in Brescia.

It is part of the decoration of the Cappella del Santissimo Sacramento. That chapel had been built in 1509 but remained mostly undecorated until on 21 March 1521 the Confraternita del Santissimo Sacramento commissioned Romanino and Moretto to produce a set of paintings. That artistic duel lasted until the mid 16th century.
