= Lattanzio Gambara =

Italian painter

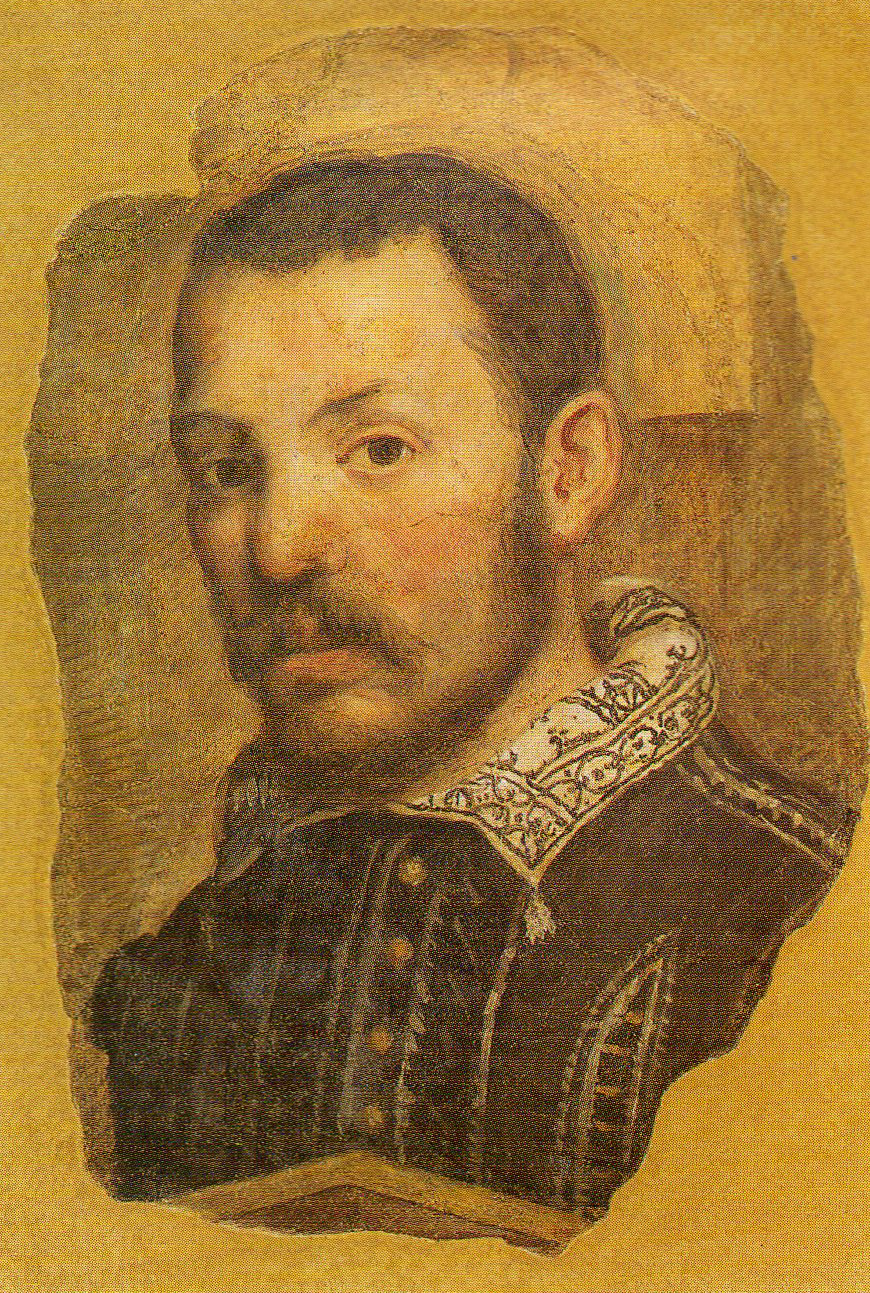
- Self-portrait
- Born: 1530
- Died: 18 March 1574 (aged 43–44)
- Known for: Painting
- Movement: Italian Renaissance and Mannerism

Lattanzio Gambara (c. 1530 – 18 March 1574) was an Italian painter, active in Renaissance and Mannerist styles. It is likely that Gambara is the same 16th century painter referred to as Lattanzio Cremonese or Lattanzio da Cremona.

== Biography ==
Born in Brescia, Gambara initially apprenticed, aged fifteen, with Giulio Campi in Cremona. By 1549 he was working alongside Girolamo Romanino, who became his father-in-law. Gambara's work also shows the influence of il Pordenone. An altarpiece of S. Maria in Silva dates to 1558. He painted frescoes in the Villa Contarini in Asolo. Another fresco cycle on the History of the Apocalypse decorated the Loggia of Brescia, until it was destroyed by bombing in 1944.

In his maturity the artist returned to Brescia to work with Romanino in a series of generally lost frescoes for Sant'Eufemia and Saint Lorenzo in Brescia. He painted altarpieces, all but one of them now lost, for the abbey of Saint Benedict in Polirone, and also decorated Palazzo Mayo in Cadignano (Lama Mocogno, in collaboration with Giulio and Antonio Campi). In 1565 he worked briefly in Venice. He painted a Nativity for the church of San Faustino in Brescia.

In 1566, Gambara completed the fresco cycle in the parish church of S. Stefano in Vimercate, with Scenes from the life of the saint in the inferior part of the apse and God the Father, Christ, Virgin and angels in the half-dome. In 1567–73, he completed his masterpiece, the frescoes in the nave of the Cathedral of Parma, in collaboration with Bernardino Gatti.

During his last years, after the decoration of the drum of the cupola of Santa Maria of the Steccata in Parma, Gambara executed various other frescoes for palaces in Brescia and Parma, including a Deposition (1568) for the church of San Pietro al Po in Cremona. He died, from falling off a scaffold, while painting the frescoes of the cupola of S. Lorenzo in Brescia.

One of his pupils was Giovita Brescianino.
