= San Francesco Altarpiece =

Painting by Girolamo Romani

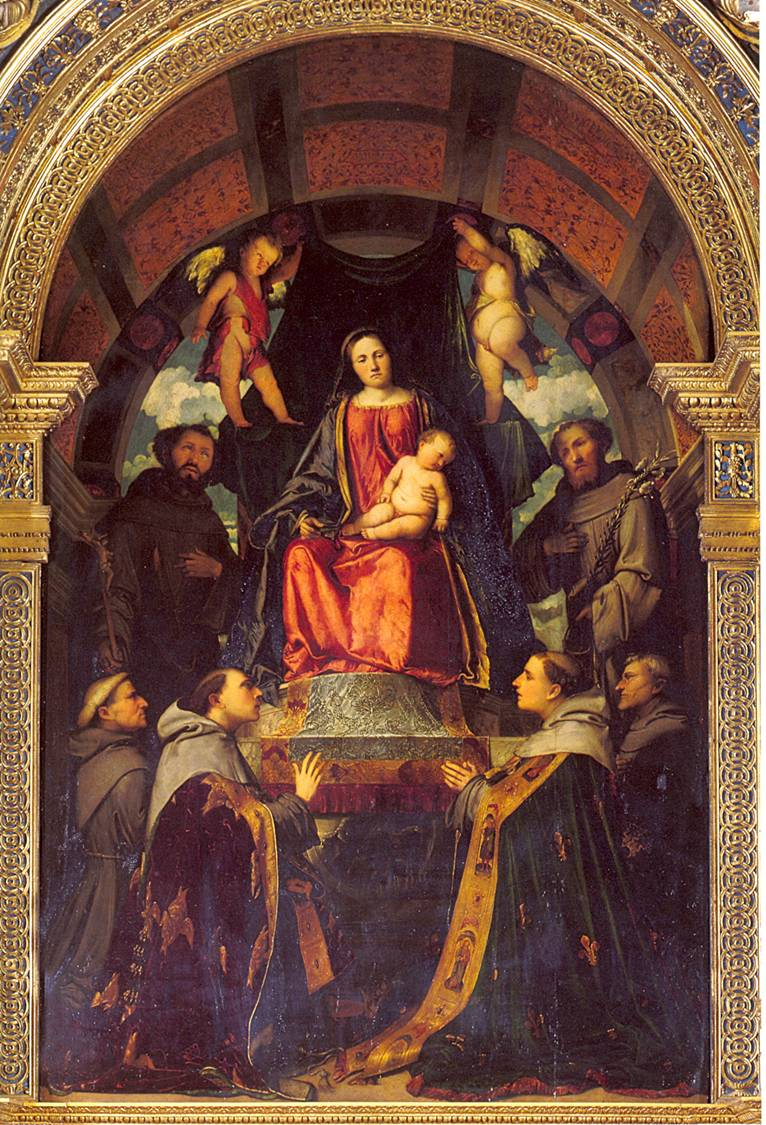
San Francesco Altarpiece (c. 1517) by Romanino

The San Francesco Altarpiece is a c.1517 oil on canvas painting by Romanino, painted for and still on show in the church of San Francesco, Brescia.

It was produced just after the artist's return from Padua, where he had come into contact with the innovations of Titian at the Scuola del Santo. It shows a Madonna and Child surrounded by Franciscan saints - Francis of Assisi and Anthony of Padua standing either side and Bonaventure, Louis of Toulouse and Bernardino of Siena kneeling at the base with a monk (father Francesco Sanson).

== Bibliography ==
- (in Italian) Pierluigi De Vecchi ed Elda Cerchiari, I tempi dell'arte, Milano, Bompiani, 1999, vol. 2. ISBN 88-451-7212-0.
