= Giovita Brescianino =

Italian painter

Giovita Brescianino (also called Giovita da Brescia or simply Bresciano or Brescianino after his native town) was an Italian painter and a pupil of Lattanzio Gambara. He was active in about the year 1580. He should not be confused with later painters called Brescianino.

He worked in Brescia, Italy, which is located in the northwestern section of the Po Valley, at the foot of the Brescian Prealps, between the Mella and the Naviglio, with the Lake Iseo to the west and the Lake Garda to the east. According to Bryan, "he was a reputable painter of history, both in oil and fresco."
