= Diptych of the Lampadii =

Ivory diptych

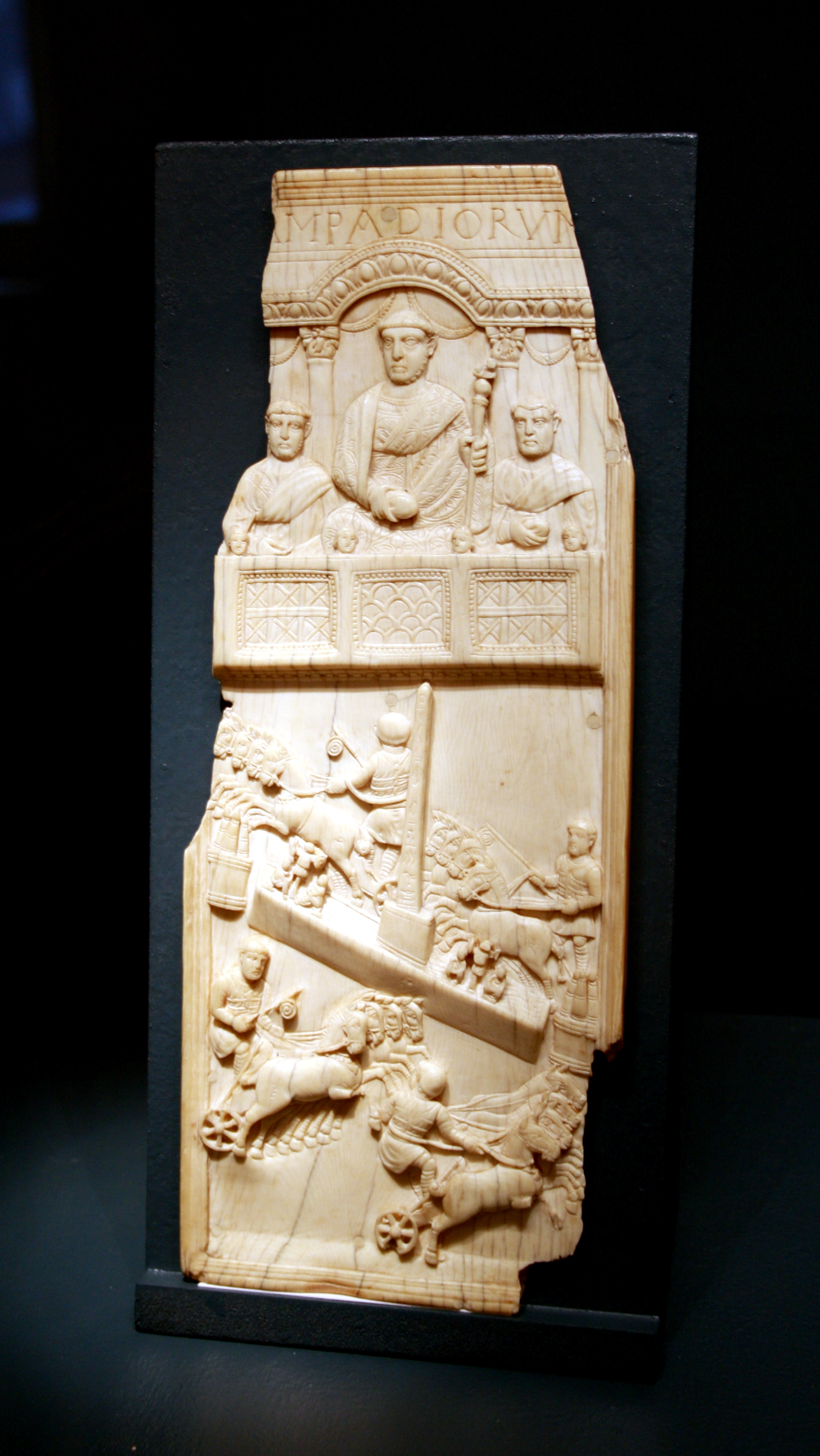
- Year: beginning of the fifth century
- Type: diptych
- Medium: ivory
- Dimensions: 27 cm × 9 cm × 2 cm (11 in × 3.5 in × 0.79 in)
- Location: Museo di Santa Giulia; Brescia

The Diptych of the Lampadii is an ivory diptych, measuring 27x9x2 cm) dating to the beginning of the Fifth century AD. Only the left plate, which is kept in the Museo di Santa Giulia in Brescia, survives.

It was acquired by Cardinal Angelo Maria Quirini in the eighteenth century and was donated to the Museo dell'Era Cristiana in the nineteenth century.

== History ==
The work, datable to the beginning of the fifth century, was made to celebrate an important event in the life of the person named in the inscription, whose only legible fragment reads "AMPADIORVM" - probably indicating a member of the family of the Lampadii.

In general, diptychs were commissioned to celebrate an individual's appointment to the consulship, so one possible identity of the person named by the inscription is Flavius Lampadius, who was consul in 530. However, since the diptych is dated to the beginning of the fifth century on stylistic grounds, it is possible that it was produced on the appointment of another member of the family, a poorly known Lampadius who was praefectus urbi of Rome in 398.

Only the left plate is conserved and that is damaged on several sides. It was acquired by the Cardinal and collector Angelo Maria Querini in the first half of the eighteenth century and he left it to the commune of Brescia in his will.

It was initially displayed in the Museo dell'Era Cristiana, which was located in some rooms of the suppressed Monastery of St. Julia at the beginning of the nineteenth century. There it remained until 1998, when, with the opening of the Museo di Santa Giulia, the diptych reached its current location in the "Collectibles and Applied Art" department, in the vitrines dedicated to Querini's collection.

== Description and style ==
The image on the surviving panel is divided into two parts.

On the upper register there is an important individual, most likely the senator Lampadius, who holds a sceptre topped by an image of the Emperor in one hand and the white cloth (or mappa) for giving the signal to begin the games in his other hand. Either side of him, depicted at a smaller scale are two other functionaries, perhaps his sons. The three individuals are inside a box decorated with panels with geometric patterns. Behind them a cornice supports a curvilinear architrave, above which the fragmentary inscription is found.

In the lower register of the panel is a stylized version of the race course in the circus, which four quadrigae, each drawn by four horses which run around the spina (the median strip) which has an obelisk in the centre, covered with stylised simplifications of Egyptian hieroglyphs. This might recall the Circus Maximus and its obelisks. At the two ends of the spina are things which seem to represent groups of statuary.

The depiction of the race track is very interesting both for its subject matter and for its technical execution, which stylises the course and all its features within the restricted space of the panel in a very efficient way, using side, front, and back views of the space alternately.

== Bibliography ==
- Jaś Elsner, Imperial Rome and Christian triumph: the art of the Roman Empire AD 100-450, Oxford University Press, 1998, ISBN 9780192842015
- Renata Stradiotti (ed.), San Salvatore - Santa Giulia a Brescia. Il monastero nella storia, Skira, Milano 2001
