= Francesco Monti (il Brescianino) =

Italian painter (1646–1703)

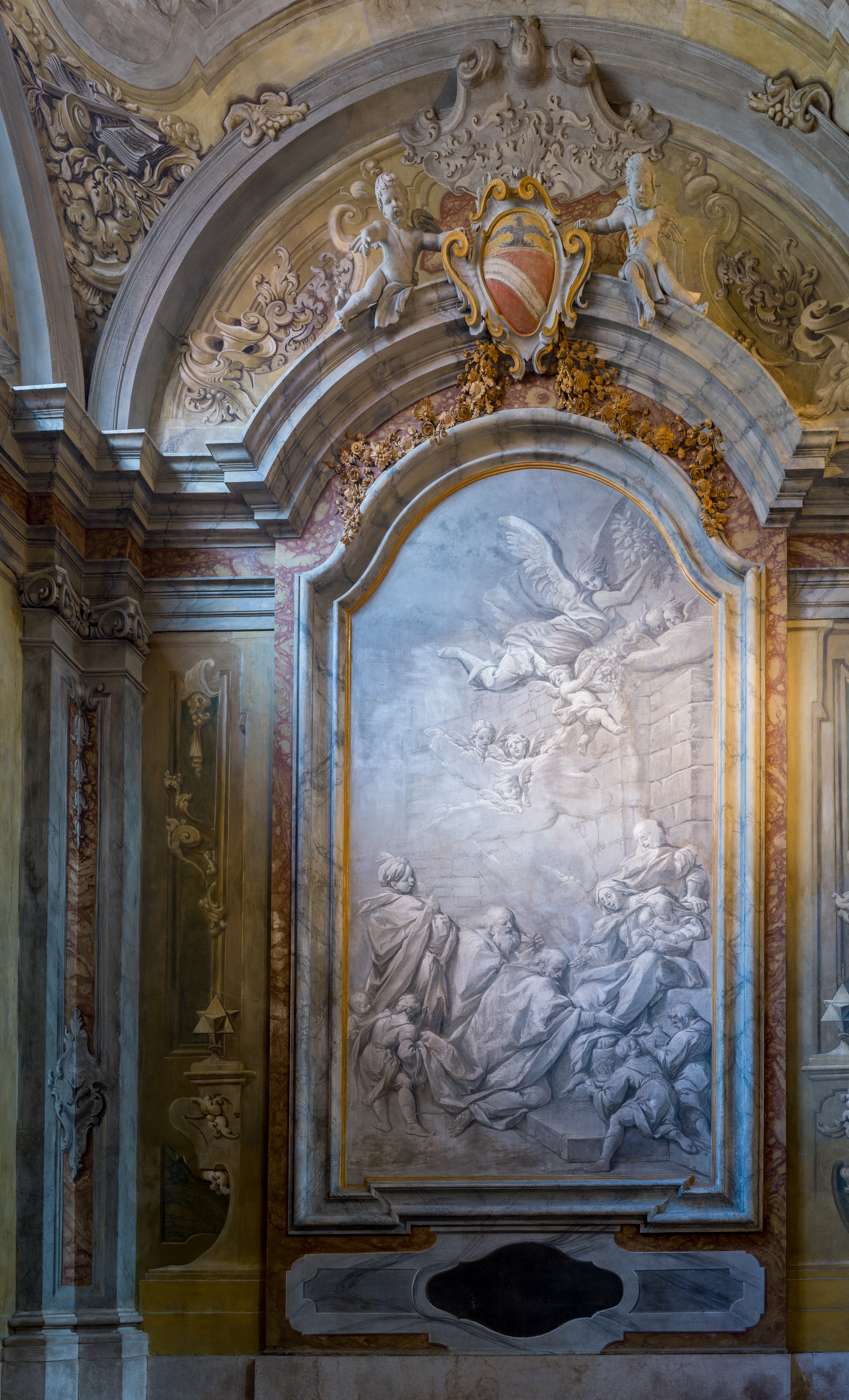
Painting of the Three Wise Men by Francesco Monti frame by Francesco Zanardi in the Holy Innocents chapel in the Santa Maria del Carmine church in Brescia

Francesco Monti (il Brescianino) (1646–1703) was an Italian painter of the late-Baroque period, mainly active in his native city of Brescia, as well as Parma.

He was a pupil of Pietro Ricchi (also known as il Lucchese), then of Jacques Courtois (also known as il Borgognone), who was well known as a battle painter. This association led Monti himself to be called Francesco della Battaglia. For many years before 1700, he worked for the ruling family of Parma. He painted the Blessed Virgin in Adoration of Christ in the Manger for the church of Santa Maria Calcherà in Parma. There are at least three Italian painters who gained the nickname Brescianino.
