= San Francesco, Brescia =

Church in Brescia, Italy

Coordinates: 45.5381°N 10.2150°E

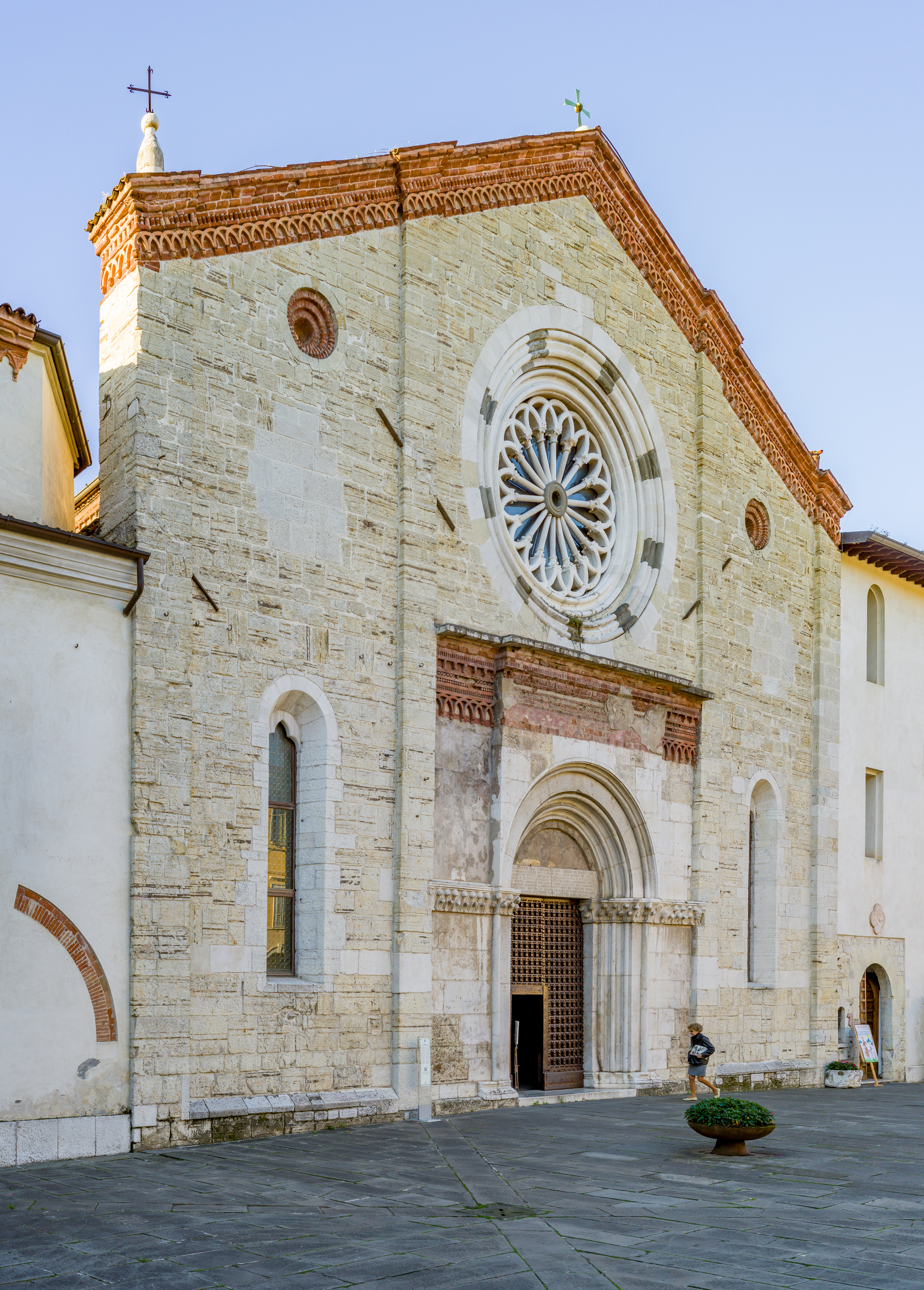
Facade of church

San Francesco is a Romanesque-Gothic style, Roman Catholic church and Franciscan monastery located on Via San Francesco d'Assisi in central Brescia, region of Lombardy, Italy.

== History ==
The Franciscan order arrived in Brescia around 1220, after a visit to the city by the founder himself. Construction of the structures began around 1254 and continued for over a century. The cloister of the adjacent Convent, designed by Guglielmo da Frisone, was completed in 1394.

In the 14th century, it is likely the entire walls and ceilings were frescoed, but the creation of chapels and other restorations covered much of this work except for traces behind the 2nd and third altars. The Crucifixion fresco in the 2nd chapel on the left dates to 1310-1320. On the right, the chapel dedicated to St Jerome has decorative sculpture (1506) by Gasparo da Coirano. Other internal decoration was by Ottavio Viviani, Pietro Ricchi (il Lucchese), and Gian Giacomo Barbello.

The Franciscan order's residence in the monastery was suppressed during Napoleonic rule, only for them to return later in the 19th century. The structure still houses monks from the order.

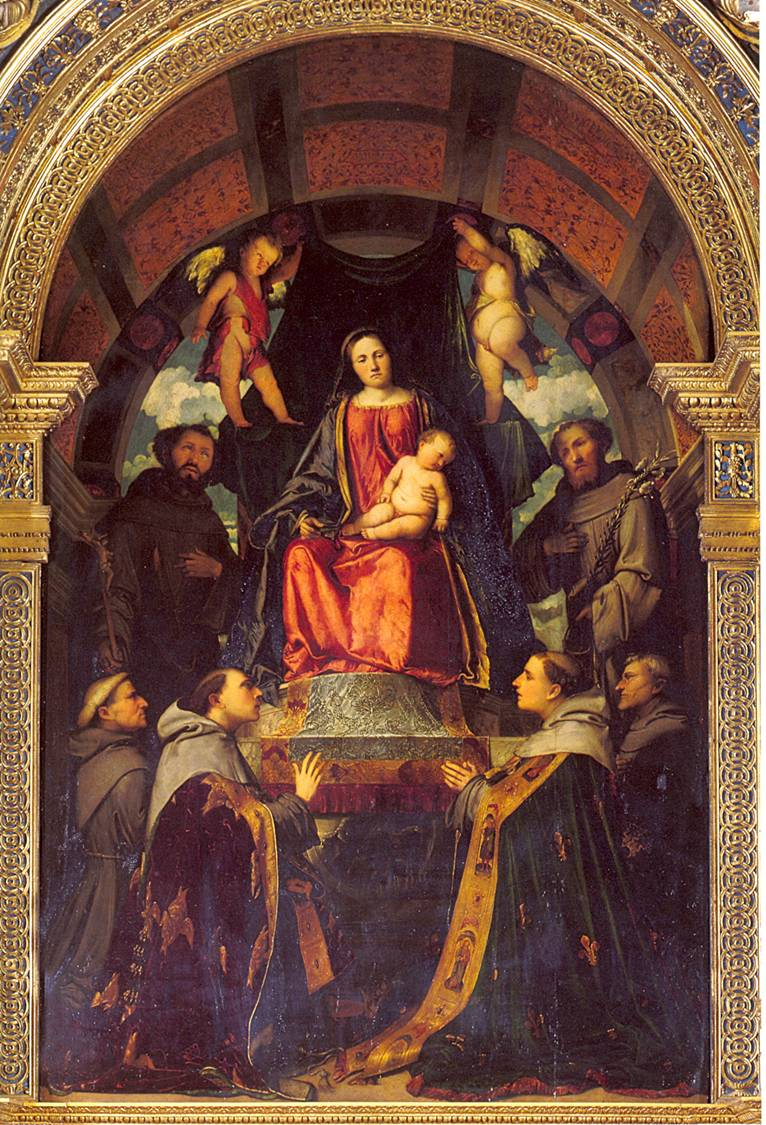
Main altarpiece by Romanino

Among the interior paintings, one finds:

- Saints Margaret of Antioch, Jerome, and Francis (1530), 1st altar on left, by Moretto da Brescia
- Descent of Holy Spirit (1520), 4th altar on left, by Il Romanino
- Madonna and child with Saints Francis, Anthony of Padua, Bonaventure, Louis of Tolouse, and Bernard (1516-1517), main altarpiece, also by Romanino
- Christ and Evangelists, lunettes of presbytery, also by Romanino
- Esther and Assuerus and Judith and Holofernes(1737), 16th-century Chapel of the Immaculate Conception, by Giovani Battista Sassi with quadrature by Giacomo Lecchi
- Main altarpiece (1603) by Grazio Cossali
