= Romanino =

Italian painter (c. 1485 – c. 1566)

Girolamo Romanino
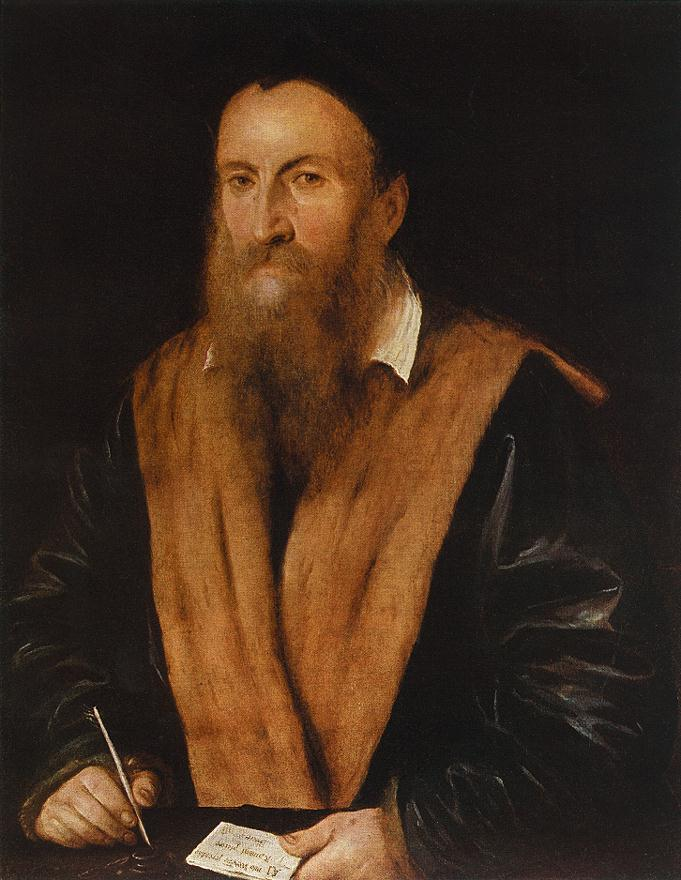
- Portrait of Romanino by Gambara.
- Born: circa 1485
- Died: circa 1566
- Known for: Painting
- Movement: Italian Renaissance

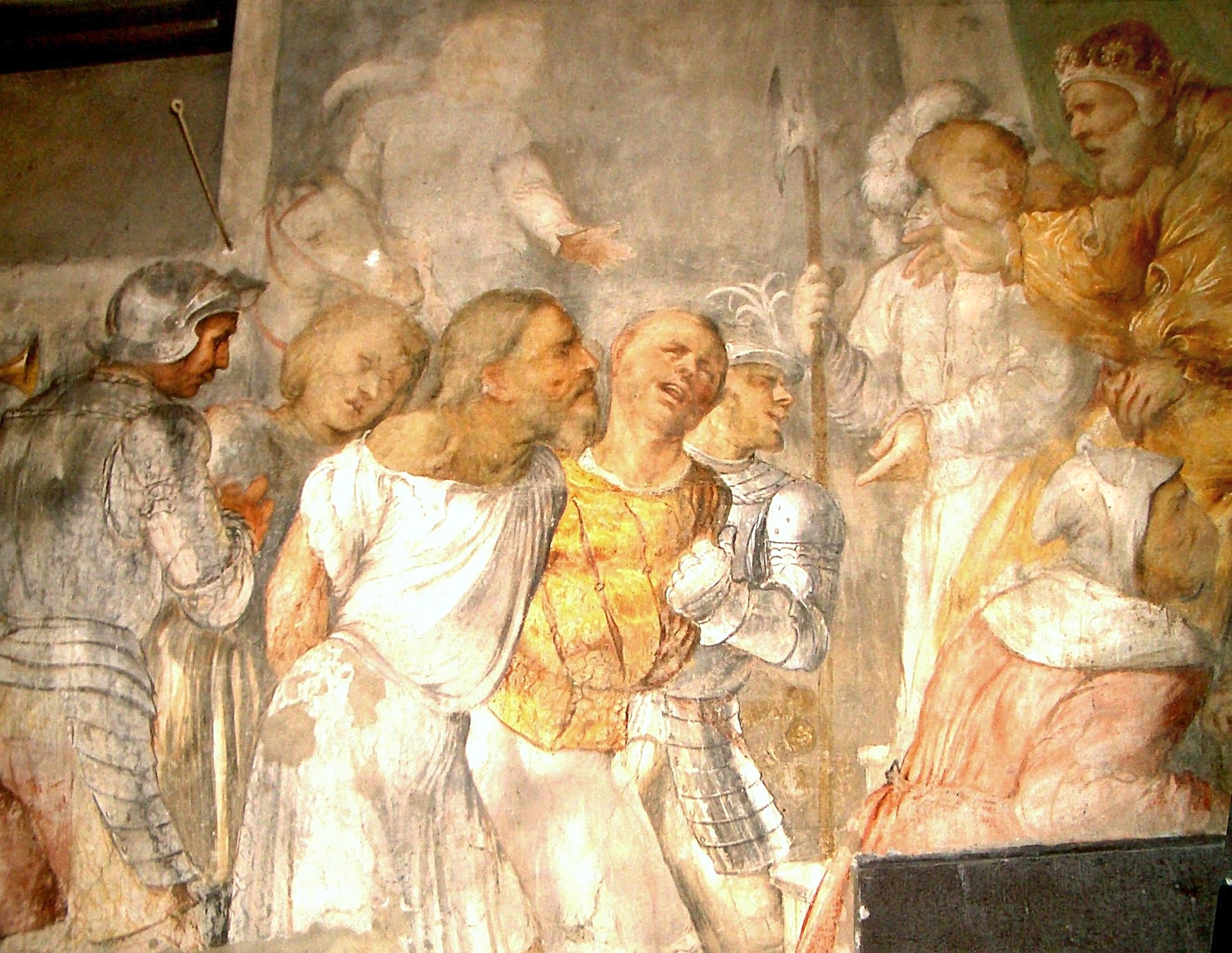
Detail of the scene painted on the right wall of the presbytery (Daniel's three friends brought before Nebuchadnezzar), c 1535, fresco, Church of Saint Anthony the Abbot, Breno, Val Camonica, Italy.

Girolamo Romani, known as Romanino (c. 1485 – c. 1566), was an Italian High Renaissance painter active in the Veneto and Lombardy, near Brescia. His long career brought forth several different styles.

== Biography ==
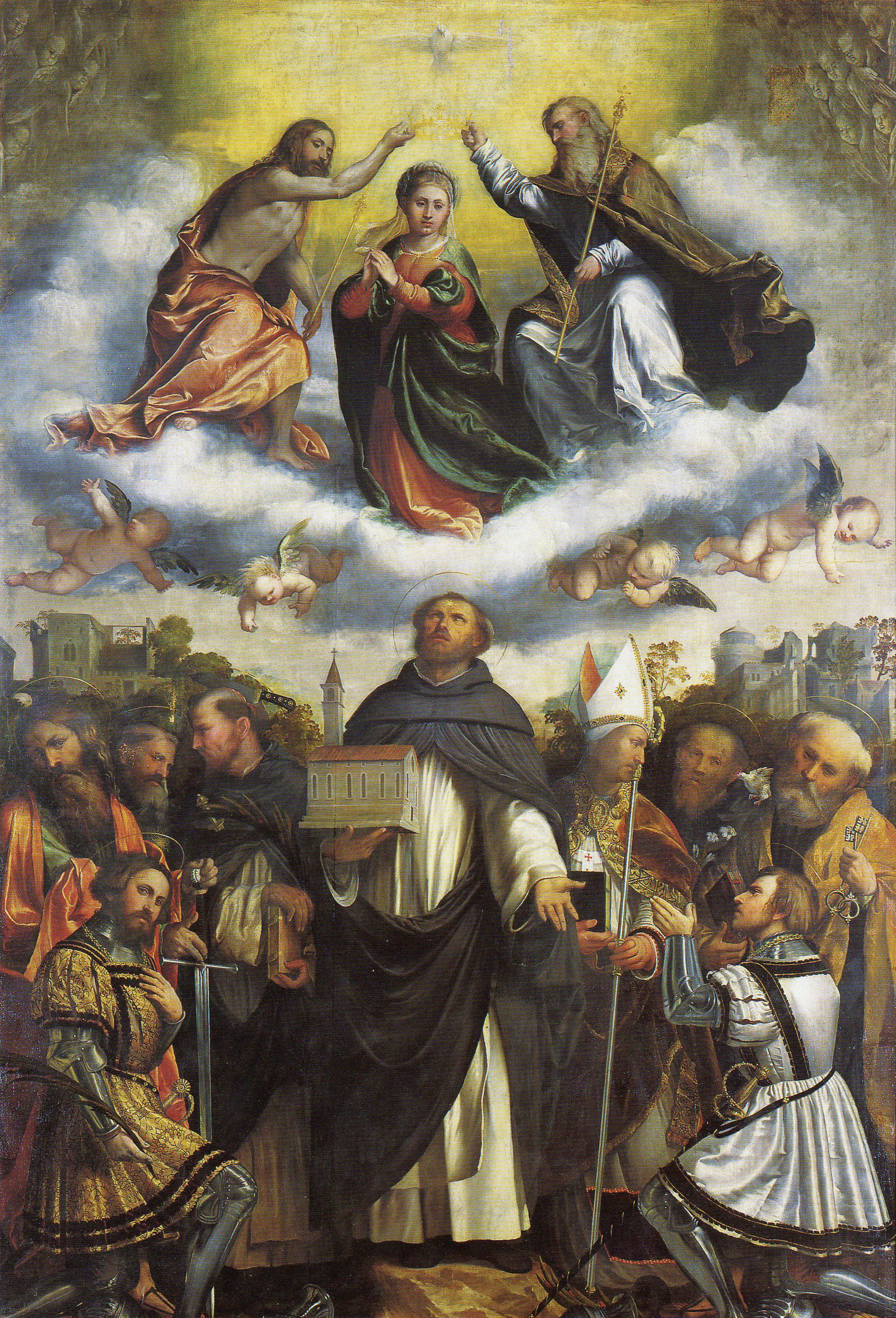
Pala di san Domenico

Romani was born in Brescia. His early training and life are not well documented.

A Quattrocento-esque Pietà, painted for the church of San Lorenzo of Brescia, dated from 1510, is exhibited in the Accademia. He took up residence in Venice in his twenties, at the latest by 1513. He was commissioned to complete a Madonna enthroned with four saints for the church of Santa Giustina in Padua in 1513. The colouration of the painting is of Venetian style, but the duller visages in a bejewelled setting recall styles of previous generations. He completed a series of frescoes for Niccolò Orsini's Palace in Ghedi and an altarpiece for San Francesco, Brescia.

Romanino completed four frescoes in the nave of the cathedral of Cremona in 1519–1520 depicting stories of the Passion of Christ. His paintings have eclectic influences, using Venetian colouration with Florentine-Lombard modelling. In the Cremona frescoes, the Lombard influence of Altobello Melone is strong, in the narrative and decorative elements of the fresco. By 1521, Romanino was replaced by Il Pordenone in the decoration of the church.

He then returned to Brescia to work (1521–1524) with Alessandro Bonvicino in the decoration of the "Cappella del Sacramento" in San Giovanni Evangelista.

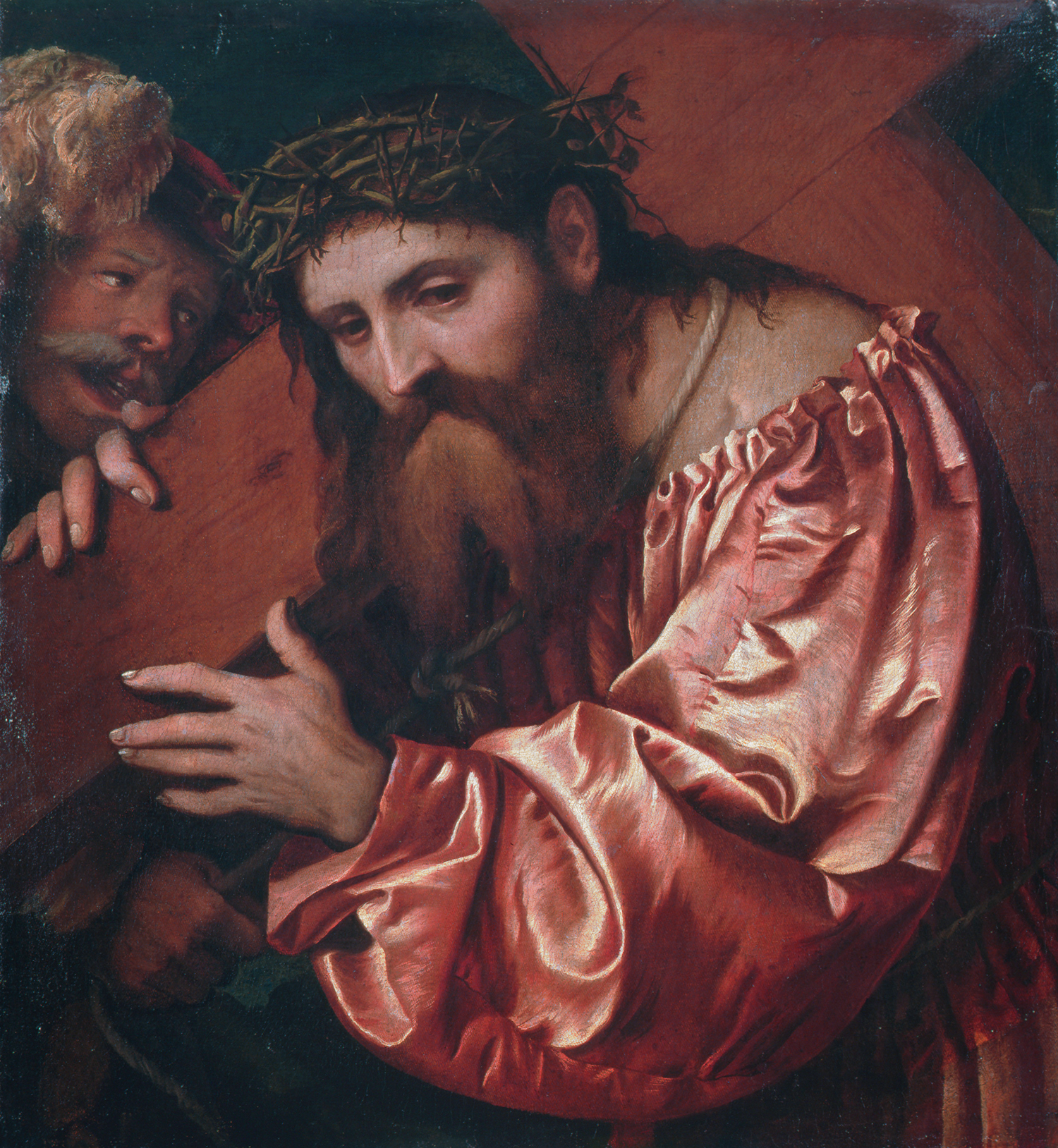
Christ Carrying the Cross.

His St. Matthew and the Angel depicts the apostle at work under candlelight and represents one of the first such nocturnes in Italian painting, a device which Correggio and Cambiaso would soon pursue. He also helped decorate the Palazzo Averoldi. A series of frescoes in the Castle of Malpaga, near Bergamo (1520-1530s), celebrating the life of Bartolomeo Colleoni, is attributed to him.

In 1531 to 1532, he worked with Dosso Dossi in fresco decoration of Castello del Buoncosiglio in Trento. He completed organ shutters for the church of Asola on Augustus and the sibyl, and Sacrifice of Isaac. Around 1545, he produced The Feast in the House of Simon the Pharisee, still in Brescia. He died between 1559 and 1561. His main pupils were his son-in-law Lattanzio Gambara, Girolamo Muziano, and Stefano Rosa. He is also known to have influenced artists such as Giulio Campi.

== Stolen painting ==
Shortly after the 1940 Nazi invasion of France, Romanino's painting Christ Carrying the Cross was stolen from the household of Frederico Gentili di Giuseppe, an Italian Jew. In 2012, it was discovered among items lent to an American museum from an Italian museum. With the help of an anonymous tip, Interpol and the United States Department of Homeland Security eventually returned it to Gentili's heirs. Presently it is insured for US$2.5 million.

== Sources ==
- Freedberg, Sydney J. (1993). Pelican History of Art (ed.). Painting in Italy, 1500–1600. pp. 360–367 Penguin Books Ltd.
