= Brescia =

City and comune in the region of Lombardy, Italy

Brescia Brèsa (Lombard)
- Comune
- Città di Brescia
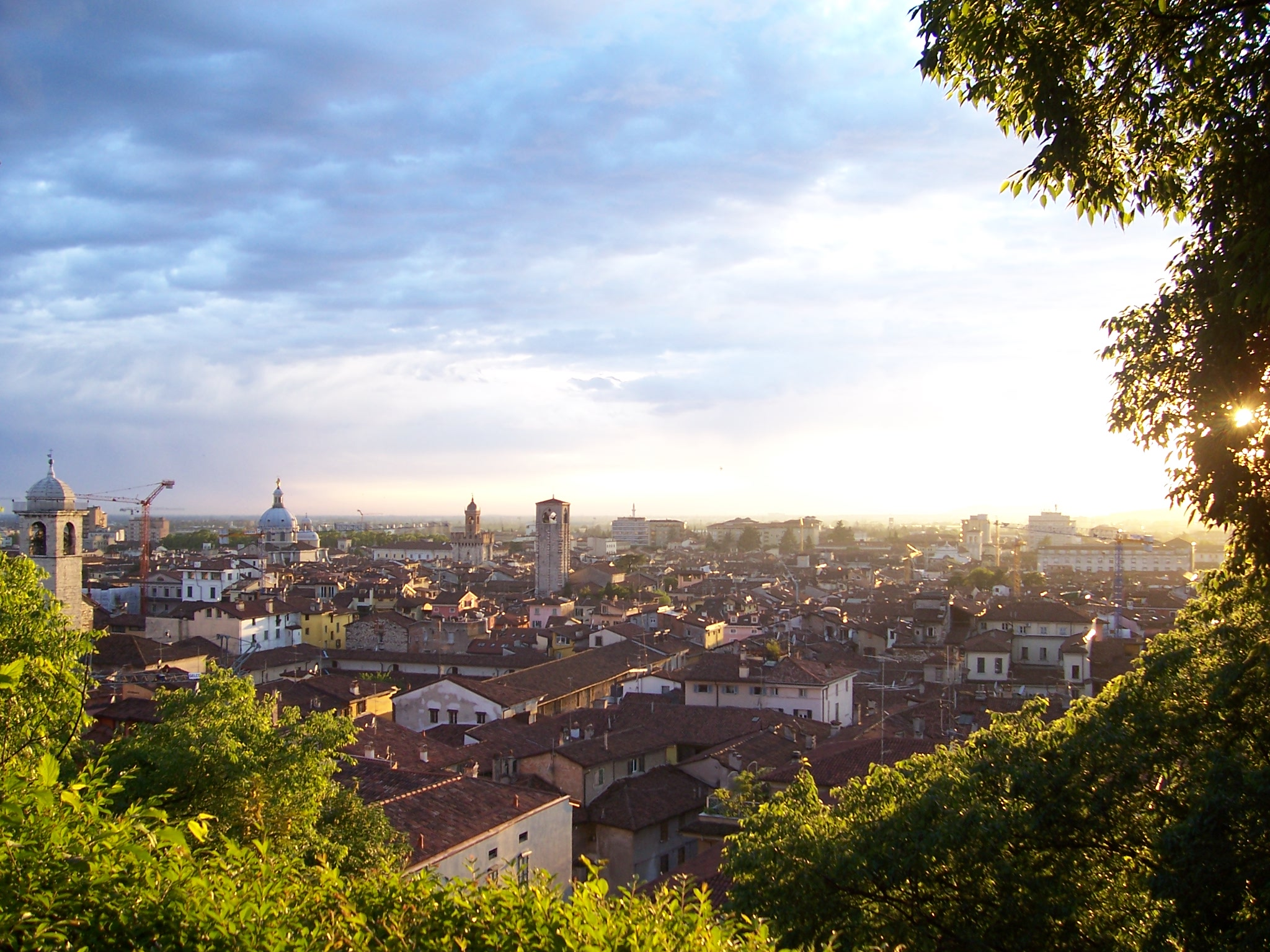
- Panorama of Brescia

- Flag Coat of arms
- Nicknames: Leonessa d'Italia ("Lioness of Italy"); La città della Mille Miglia ("The City of the Mille Miglia")
- Motto: Brixia fidelis ("Brescia the faithful")
- Location within Lombardy Location within Italy
- Coordinates: 45°32′30″N 10°13′00″E
- Country: Italy
- Region: Lombardy
- Province: Brescia (BS)
- First settlement: Celtic settlement: Roman settlement: 1200 BC; 7th century BC; 89 BC

Government
  - Mayor: Laura Castelletti (independent)

Area
  - Total: 90.34 km^{2} (34.88 sq mi)
- Elevation: 149 m (489 ft)
- Highest elevation: 874 m (2,867 ft)
- Lowest elevation: 104 m (341 ft)

Population (2026)
  - Total: 202,135
  - Density: 2,237/km^{2} (5,795/sq mi)
- Demonyms: English: Brescian; Italian: bresciano (m.), bresciana (f.); Brescian: bresà (m.), bresàna (f.
- Time zone: UTC+1 (CET)
  - Summer (DST): UTC+2 (CEST)
- Postal code: 25121-25136
- Dialing code: 030
- Patron saint: Sts. Faustino and Giovita
- Saint day: 15 February
- Website: www.comune.brescia.it

Brescia (Italian pronunciation: [ˈbreʃʃa], locally [ˈbreːʃa]; Brescian: Brèsa [ˈbrɛsɔ, ˈbrɛhɔ, ˈbrɛsa, ˈbrɛha]; Venetian: Bressa or Bresa; Latin: Brixia) is a city and commune in the region of Lombardy, northern Italy. It is situated at the foot of the Alps, a few kilometers from the lakes Garda and Iseo. With a population of 202,135, it is the second largest city in Lombardy behind Milan, the fourth largest in northwest Italy and it is the northernmost Italian city among those with over 200,000 inhabitants. The urban area of Brescia extends beyond the administrative city limits and has a population of 672,822, while over 1.5 million people live in its metropolitan area. The city is the administrative capital of the Province of Brescia, one of the largest in Italy, with over 1.2 million inhabitants.

Founded over 3,200 years ago, Brescia (in antiquity Brixia) has been an important regional centre since pre-Roman times. Its old town contains the best-preserved Roman public buildings in northern Italy and numerous monuments, such as the medieval castle, the Old and New cathedral, the Renaissance Piazza della Loggia and the rationalist Piazza della Vittoria.

The monumental archaeological area of the Roman forum and the monastic complex of San Salvatore-Santa Giulia have become a UNESCO World Heritage Site as part of a group of seven inscribed as Longobards in Italy, Places of Power.

Brescia is considered to be an important industrial city. Metallurgy and production of metal parts, machine tools and firearms are of particular economic significance, along with mechanical and automotive engineering. Major companies based in the Brescia area include utility company A2A, steel producer Lucchini and firearms manufacturers Beretta and Perazzi.

Brescia is home to the prestigious Mille Miglia classic car race that starts and ends in the town.

In the arts, it was nicknamed Leonessa d'Italia ("The Lioness of Italy"). Gabriele d'Annunzio selected Gardone Riviera (nearby on the shores of Garda Lake) as his final residence. The estate he built (largely thanks to state-sponsored funding), il Vittoriale, is now a public institution devoted to the arts; a museum dedicated to him is hosted in his former residence. Brescia is also the setting for most of the action in Alessandro Manzoni's 1822 play Adelchi.

The province is known for being the production area of the Franciacorta sparkling wine, as well as the main source of Italian-produced caviar. Brescia with her territory was the "European Region of Gastronomy" in 2017 and the "Italian Capital of Culture" with Bergamo in 2023.

== History ==
=== Ancient era ===
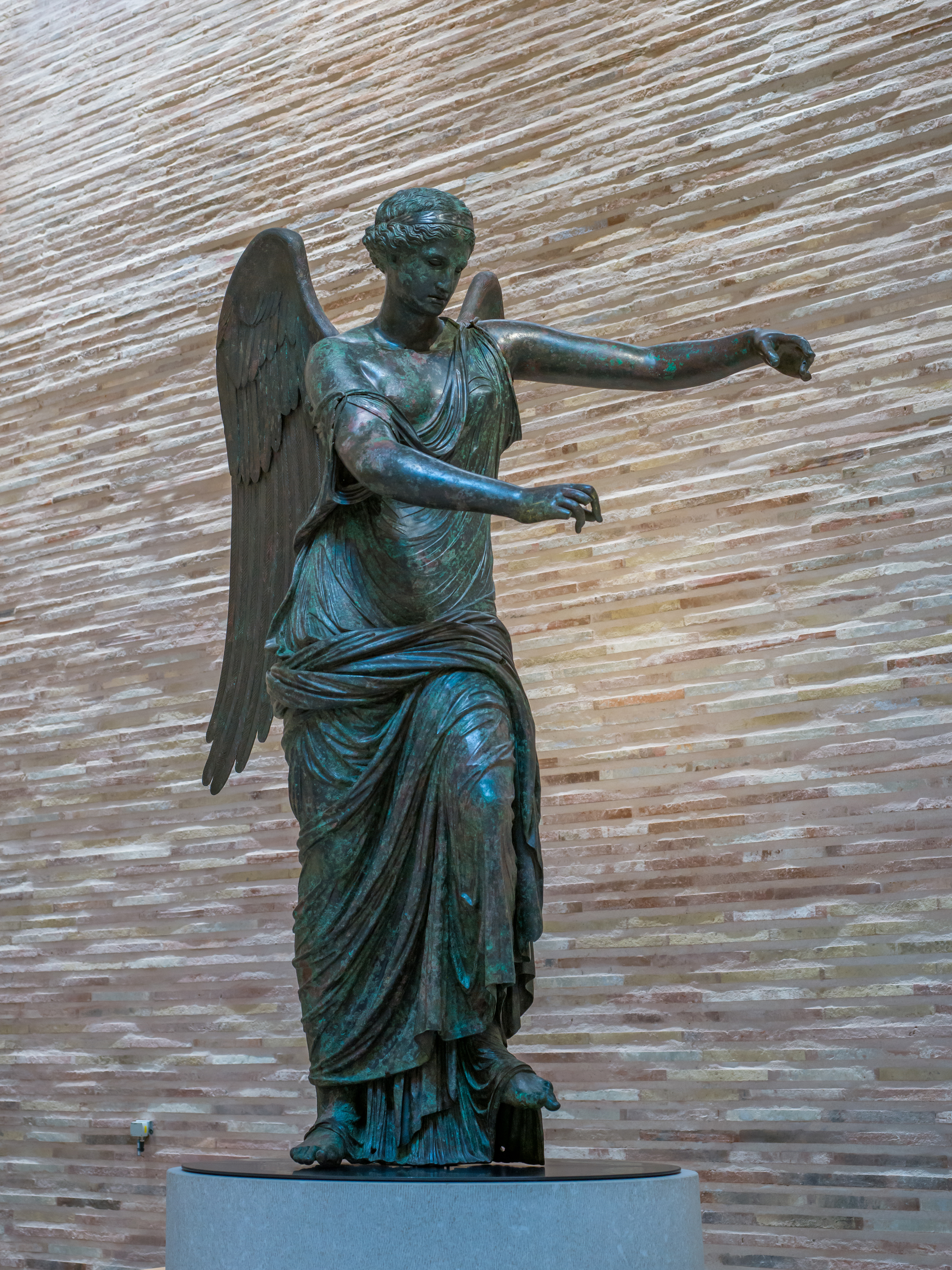
Winged Victory of Brescia (AD 1st century)

Various myths relate to the founding of Brescia: one assigns it to Hercules, while another attributes its foundation as Altilia ("the other Ilium") by a fugitive from the siege of Troy. According to another myth, the founder was the king of the Ligures, Cidnus, who had invaded the Padan Plain in the late Bronze Age. Colle Cidneo (Cidnus's Hill) was named after that version, and it is the site of the medieval castle. This myth seems to have a grain of truth, because recent archaeological excavations have unearthed remains of a settlement dating back to 1,200 BC that scholars presume to have been built and inhabited by Ligures peoples. Others scholars attribute the founding of Brescia to the Etruscans.

The Gallic Cenomani, allies of the Insubres, invaded in the 7th century BC, and used the town as their capital. The city became Roman in 225 BC, when the Cenomani submitted to the Romans. During the Carthaginian Wars, 'Brixia' (as it was called then) was allied with the Romans. During a Celtic alliance against Rome the city remained faithful to the Romans. With their Roman allies the city attacked and destroyed the Insubres by surprise. Subsequently, the city and the tribe entered the Roman world peacefully as faithful allies, maintaining a certain administrative freedom. In 89 BC, Brixia was recognized as civitas ("city"), and in 41 BC, 48 years later, its inhabitants finally received Roman citizenship. Augustus founded a civil (not military) colony there in 27 BC, and he and Tiberius constructed an aqueduct to supply it. Roman Brixia had at least three temples, an aqueduct, a theatre, a forum with another temple built under Vespasianus, and some baths.

As Constantine I advanced against Maxentius in AD 312, an engagement took place at Brixia in which the enemy was forced to retreat as far as Verona. In 402, the city was ravaged by the Visigoths of Alaric I. During the 452 invasion of the Huns under Attila, the city was besieged and sacked. Forty years later, it was one of the first conquests by the Gothic general Theoderic the Great in his war against Odoacer.

=== Middle Ages ===
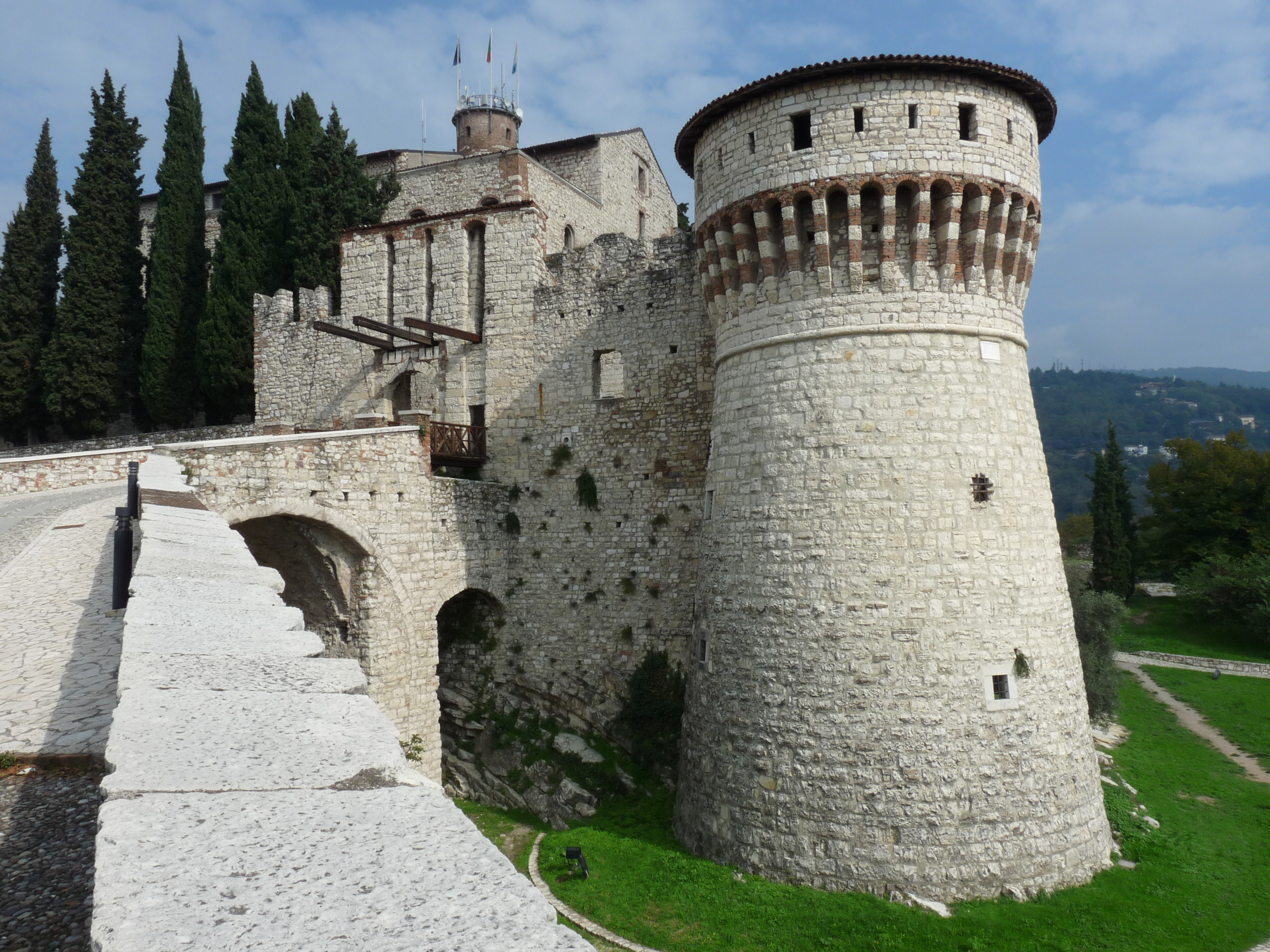
The medieval castle of Brescia

In 568 (or 569), Brescia was taken from the Byzantines by the Lombards, who made it the capital of one of their semi-independent duchies. The first duke was Alachis, who died in 573. Later dukes included the future kings of the Lombards Rothari and Rodoald, and Alachis II, a fervent anti-Catholic, who was killed in battle at Cornate d'Adda in 688. The last king of the Lombards, Desiderius, also held the title Duke of Brescia.

In 774, Charlemagne captured the city and ended the presence of the Lombard kingdom in northern Italy. Notingus was the first (prince-)bishop (in 844) who bore the title of count (see Bishopric of Brescia). From 855 to 875, under Louis II the Younger, Brescia became de facto capital of the Holy Roman Empire. Later the power of the bishop as imperial representative was gradually opposed by the local citizens and nobles, resulting in Brescia becoming a free commune around the early 12th century. Subsequently, it expanded into the nearby countryside, first at the expense of the local landholders, and later against the neighbouring communes, notably Bergamo and Cremona. Brescia defeated the latter twice at Pontoglio, then at the Grumore (mid-12th century) and in the battle of the Malamorte (Bad Death) (1192).

In 1138, Brescia experienced a communal revolt against the local Bishop Manfred led by radical reformer and Canons regular Arnold of Brescia. This revolt broke out due to the city's involvement in the ecclesiastical and political conflict that resulted from the 1130 papal election. This controversial election divided the College of Cardinals and caused a schism between Pope Innocent II (who had the minority vote) and Antipope Anacletus II (who had the majority vote). During the early 1130s, when Anacletus had power over Brescia, he appointed Bishop Villanus to the diocese, but in 1132 Innocent regained control and installed Manfred. Despite Manfred supporting the reformed clergy, which Brescia had historical supported with its proximity to Milan and the Pataria reform movement in the 11th century, Manfred was cast out as he clashed with the growth of the commune and the local nobility. The revolt began around 1135 and was manageable at first, but by 1138 Manfred was forced to seek papal support and left for Rome. Arnold is believed to have joined the revolt around this time, as contemporary historian John of Salisbury records that Arnold only "so swayed the minds of the citizens that they would scarcely open their gates to the bishop on his return." Manfred was therefore forced to return to Rome and was likely witness to the Second Council of the Lateran in 1139, after which he obtained Pope Innocent's support and had Arnold exiled from Italy. Arnold's home was Brescia, but he would never return to the city; instead he developed his reform ideology while in exile and continued to dissent against the Church. He worked with intellectual Peter Abelard (who he potentially studied under in the 1110s) who was condemned of heresy at the Council of Sens 1141 and went on to join the Commune of Rome in 1148, which led to his execution by Frederick Barbarossa and Pope Adrian IV in 1155.

The Pallata Tower

During the struggles of the 12th and 13th centuries between the Lombard cities and the Holy Roman emperors, Brescia was implicated either in league with the emperors or against them. In the Battle of Legnano the contingent from Brescia was second in size to that of Milan. The Peace of Constance (1183) that ended the war with Frederick Barbarossa confirmed officially the free status of the comune. In 1201 the podestà Rambertino Buvalelli made peace and established a league with Cremona, Bergamo, and Mantua. Memorable also was the siege laid by the Emperor Frederick II in 1238 on account of the part taken by Brescia in the Battle of Cortenova (1237). Brescia came through this assault victorious. After the fall of the Hohenstaufen, republican institutions declined in Brescia as in the other free cities and the leadership was contested between powerful families, chief among them the Maggi and the Brusati, the latter of the (pro-imperial, anti-papal) Ghibelline party. In 1258 the city fell into the hands of Ezzelino da Romano.

In 1311 Emperor Henry VII laid siege to Brescia for six months, losing three-fourths of his army. Later the Scaliger of Verona, aided by the exiled Ghibellines, sought to place Brescia under subjugation. The citizens of Brescia then had recourse to John of Luxemburg, but Mastino II della Scala expelled the governor appointed by him. His mastery was soon contested by the Visconti of Milan, but not even their rule was undisputed, as Pandolfo III Malatesta took possession of the city in 1406. However, in 1416 he bartered it to Filippo Maria Visconti duke of Milan, who in 1426 sold it to the Venetians. The Milanese nobles forced Filippo to resume hostilities against the Venetians, and thus to attempt the recovery of Brescia, but he was defeated in the Battle of Maclodio (1427), near Brescia, by general Carmagnola, commander of the Venetian mercenary army. In 1439, Brescia was once more besieged by Francesco Sforza, captain of the Venetians, who defeated Niccolò Piccinino, Filippo's condottiero. Thenceforward Brescia and the province were a Venetian possession, only disrupted by the French conquest in 1512.

=== Early Modern era ===
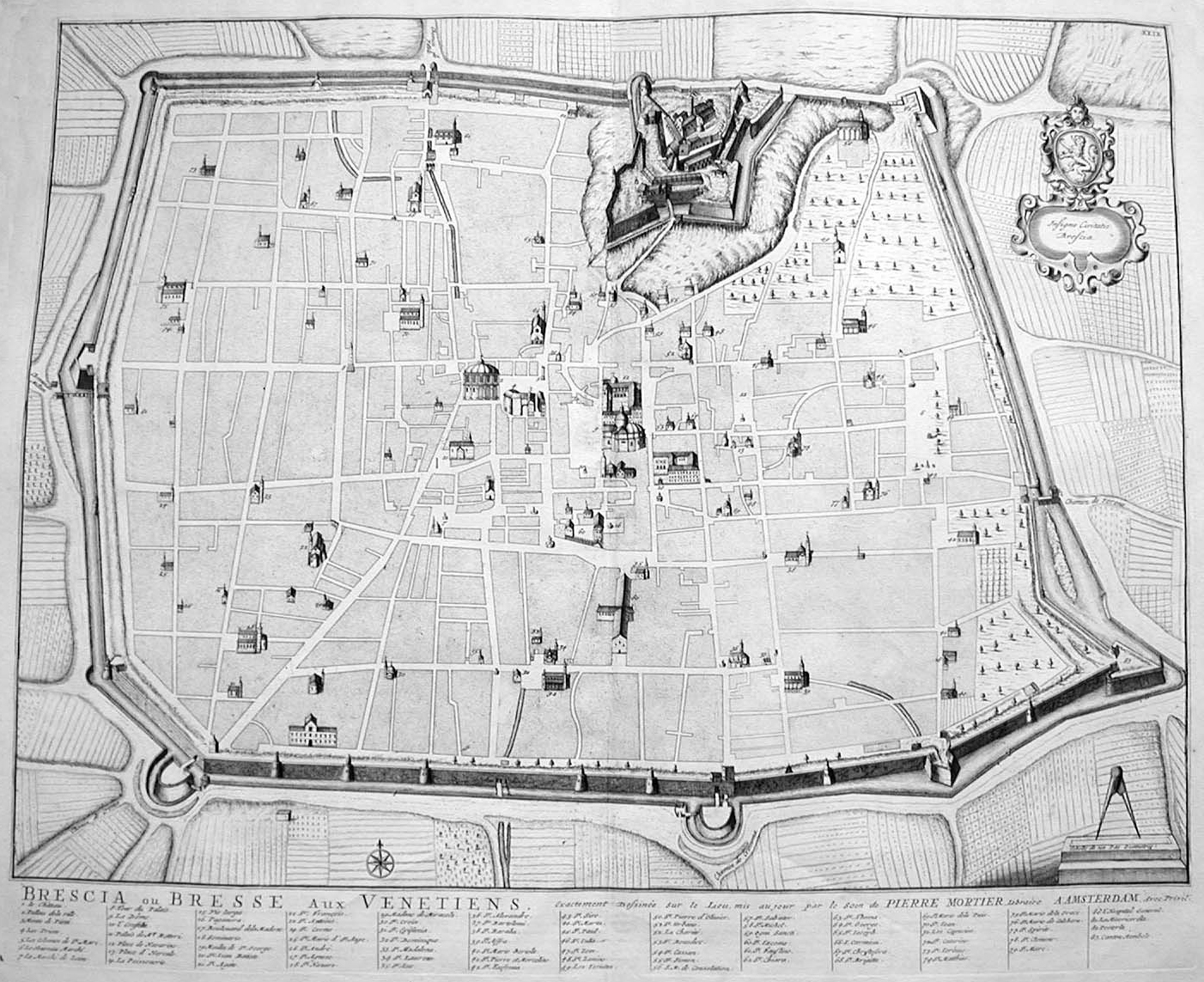
Map of Brescia in the early 18th century

The dome of the New Cathedral

Brescia has had a major role in the history of the violin. Many archive documents very clearly testify that from 1490 to 1640 Brescia was the cradle of a magnificent school of string players and makers, all styled "maestro", of all the different kinds of stringed instruments of the Renaissance: viola da gamba (viols); violone, lyra, lyrone, violetta, and viola da brazzo. One can find from 1495 "maestro delle viole" or "maestro delle lire" and later, at least from 1558, "maestro di far violini" that is master of violin making. From 1530 the word violin appeared in Brescian documents and spread in later decades throughout north of Italy, reaching Venezia and Cremona.

Early in the 16th century, Brescia was one of the wealthiest cities of Lombardy, but it never recovered from its sack by the French in 1512.

The "Sack of Brescia" took place on 18 February 1512, during the War of the League of Cambrai. The city of Brescia had revolted against French control, garrisoning itself with Venetian troops. Gaston de Foix, recently arrived to command the French armies in Italy, ordered the city to surrender; when it refused, he attacked it with around 12,000 men. The French attack took place in a pouring rain, through a field of mud; Foix ordered his men to remove their shoes for better traction. The defenders inflicted heavy casualties on the French, but were eventually overrun, suffering 8,000 – 15,000 casualties. The Gascon infantry and landsknechts then proceeded to thoroughly sack the city, massacring thousands of civilians over the next five days. Following this, the city of Bergamo paid some 60,000 ducats to the French to avoid a similar fate.

The French occupied Brescia until 1520, when Venetian rule resumed. Thereafter, Brescia shared the fortunes of the Venetian republic until the latter fell at the hands of French general Napoleon Bonaparte.

In 1769, in the Brescia explosion, the city was devastated when the Bastion of San Nazaro was struck by lightning. The resulting fire ignited 90,000 kg (90 t; 200,000 lb; 99 short tons) of gunpowder stored there, causing a massive explosion which destroyed one-sixth of the Brescia and killed 3,000 people.

In 1799, during the French Revolutionary Wars, the fortress, occupied by French troops, fell to the advancing allies of the Second Coalition (see Capture of Brescia).

=== 19th century and later ===
Piazza della Vittoria, example of Italian rationalism, built between 1927 and 1932 by the architect Marcello Piacentini

In the Napoleonic era, Brescia was part of the various revolutionary republics and then of the Napoleonic Kingdom of Italy after Napoleon became Emperor of the French. After the end of the Napoleonic era in 1815, Brescia was annexed to the Austrian puppet state known as the Kingdom of Lombardy–Venetia.

Brescia revolted in 1848; then again in March 1849, when the Piedmontese army invaded Austrian-controlled Lombardy, the people in Brescia overthrew the hated local Austrian administration, and the Austrian military contingent, led by General Julius Jacob von Haynau, retreated to the Castello di Brescia. When the larger military operations turned against the Piedmontese, forcing them to retreat, Brescia was left to its own resources. Still, the citizens managed to resist recapture by the Austrian army for ten days of bloody and obstinate street fighting that are now celebrated as the Ten Days of Brescia. This prompted poet Giosuè Carducci to nickname Brescia Leonessa d'Italia ("Lioness of Italy") for it fierce resistance.

In 1859, the city was conquered by the Italian troops and Brescia was included in the newly founded Kingdom of Italy.

The city was awarded a gold medal for its resistance against Fascism in World War II.

On 28 May 1974, it was the seat of the bloody Piazza della Loggia bombing.

== Geography ==
Panoramic view of the city

=== Topography ===
Brescia is located in the northwestern section of the Po Valley, at the foot of the Brescian Prealps, between the Mella and the Naviglio, with the Lake Iseo to the west and the Lake Garda to the east (but it has also other important lakes like Idro and Moro). The southern area of the city is flat, while towards the north the territory becomes hilly. The city's lowest point is 104 metres (341 ft) above sea level, the highest point is Monte Maddalena at 874 metres (2,867 ft), while the centre of the town is 149 metres (489 ft). The administrative comune covers a total area of 90.3 square kilometres (34.9 mi^{2}).

Modern Brescia has a central area focused on residential and tertiary activities. Around the city proper, lies a vast urban agglomeration with over 600,000 inhabitants that expands mainly to the north, to the west and to the east, engulfing many communes in a continuous urban landscape.

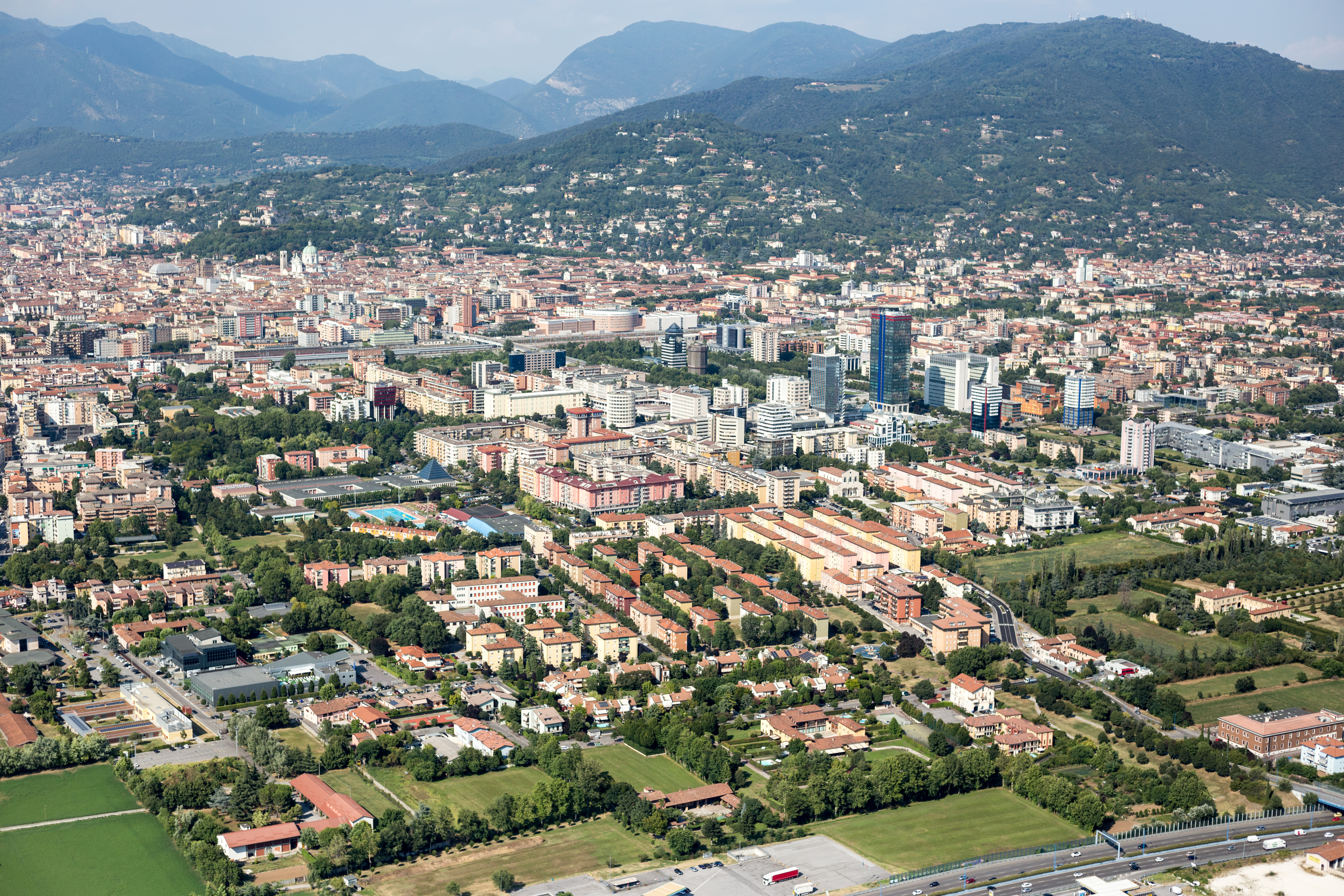
From left to right: panoramic views of the city from the south and from the west, panoramic view of the city centre and the business district

=== Climate ===
According to the Köppen climate classification, Brescia has a mid-latitude humid subtropical climate (Cfa). Its average annual temperature is 13.7 °C (57 °F): 18.2 °C (65 °F) during the day and 9.1 °C (48 °F) at night. The warmest months are June, July, and August, with high temperatures from 27.8 to 30.3 °C (82 to 87 °F). The coldest are December, January, and February, with low temperatures from −1.5 to 0.6 °C (29 to 33 °F).

Winter is moderately cold, but not harsh, with some snow, mainly occurs from December through February, but snow cover does not usually remain for long. Summer can be sultry, when humidity levels are high and peak temperatures can reach 35 °C (95 °F). Spring and autumn are generally pleasant, with temperatures ranging between 10 and 20 °C (50 and 68 °F).

The relative humidity is high throughout the year, especially in winter when it causes fog, mainly from dusk until late morning, although the phenomenon has become increasingly less frequent in recent years.

Precipitation is spread evenly throughout the year. The driest month is December, with precipitation of 54.6 mm (2.15 in), while the wettest month is May, with 104.9 mm (4.13 in) of rain.

Climate data for Brescia (Brescia Ghedi Air Base) (1991–2020 normals, extremes 1951–present)
Month	Jan	Feb	Mar	Apr	May	Jun	Jul	Aug	Sep	Oct	Nov	Dec	Year
Record high °C (°F)	19.9 (67.8)	22.0 (71.6)	27.3 (81.1)	30.6 (87.1)	35.3 (95.5)	38.0 (100.4)	39.0 (102.2)	38.4 (101.1)	33.3 (91.9)	29.0 (84.2)	22.8 (73.0)	17.0 (62.6)	39.0 (102.2)
Mean daily maximum °C (°F)	6.5 (43.7)	9.4 (48.9)	14.8 (58.6)	18.9 (66.0)	23.8 (74.8)	28.0 (82.4)	30.4 (86.7)	30.2 (86.4)	25.2 (77.4)	18.6 (65.5)	11.9 (53.4)	6.9 (44.4)	18.7 (65.7)
Daily mean °C (°F)	3.1 (37.6)	5.0 (41.0)	9.7 (49.5)	13.7 (56.7)	18.6 (65.5)	22.8 (73.0)	25.0 (77.0)	24.8 (76.6)	20.2 (68.4)	14.6 (58.3)	8.7 (47.7)	3.7 (38.7)	14.2 (57.5)
Mean daily minimum °C (°F)	−0.3 (31.5)	0.6 (33.1)	4.6 (40.3)	8.6 (47.5)	13.4 (56.1)	17.7 (63.9)	19.7 (67.5)	19.4 (66.9)	15.2 (59.4)	10.6 (51.1)	5.6 (42.1)	0.5 (32.9)	9.6 (49.4)
Record low °C (°F)	−19.4 (−2.9)	−14.6 (5.7)	−9.3 (15.3)	−2.5 (27.5)	0.2 (32.4)	5.2 (41.4)	9.4 (48.9)	8.1 (46.6)	3.8 (38.8)	−5.8 (21.6)	−8.2 (17.2)	−15.2 (4.6)	−19.4 (−2.9)
Average precipitation mm (inches)	53.1 (2.09)	47.1 (1.85)	53.9 (2.12)	76.2 (3.00)	91.1 (3.59)	75.9 (2.99)	62.0 (2.44)	78.2 (3.08)	96.4 (3.80)	102.1 (4.02)	106.7 (4.20)	71.0 (2.80)	913.7 (35.98)
Average precipitation days (≥ 1.0 mm)	5.6	5.4	5.4	8.2	9.0	7.4	5.0	5.3	6.5	7.8	8.8	6.7	81.1
Average relative humidity (%)	86	81	75	76	73	71	72	72	75	79	85	86	78
Source 1: Istituto Superiore per la Protezione e la Ricerca Ambientale
Source 2: Servizio Meteorologico (humidity 1961–1990)

== Demographics ==
Historical population
Year	Pop.	±%
1861	56,878	—
1871	58,539	+2.9%
1881	62,899	+7.4%
1901	73,033	+16.1%
1911	87,210	+19.4%
1921	103,636	+18.8%
1931	114,607	+10.6%
1936	123,332	+7.6%
1951	142,059	+15.2%
1961	172,744	+21.6%
1971	210,047	+21.6%
1981	206,661	−1.6%
1991	194,502	−5.9%
2001	187,567	−3.6%
2011	189,902	+1.2%
2021	195,906	+3.2%
Source: ISTAT

As of 2026, the population is 201,342, of which 48.6% are male, and 51.4% are female. Minors make up 14.8% of the population, and seniors make up 24.9%.

=== Immigration ===
Brescia is one of the most cosmopolitan and multicultural cities in Italy. As of 2025, the foreign-born population is 44,985, making up 22.6% of the total population. The largest immigrant group comes from Eastern European nations (mostly Romania, Ukraine, Moldova and Albania), the others from South Asia (mostly Pakistan, India and Sri Lanka) and Africa. The city is predominantly Roman Catholic, but due to immigration now has some Orthodox Christian, Sikh and Muslim followers.

Regions of birth (2025)
1. Italy (77.4%)
2. Rest of Europe (8.50%)
3. Africa (5.30%)
4. Asia (7.50%)
5. Americas (1.70%)
6. Other (0.02%)

Foreign countries of birth	Population (2025)
Pakistan	4,416
Moldova	4,395
Ukraine	3,535
India	3,319
Egypt	3,314
Albania	2,976
Romania	2,372
China	1,862
Morocco	1,638
Sri Lanka	1,618
Philippines	1,532
Bangladesh	1,362
Senegal	1,263
others	each <1,000

== Government ==
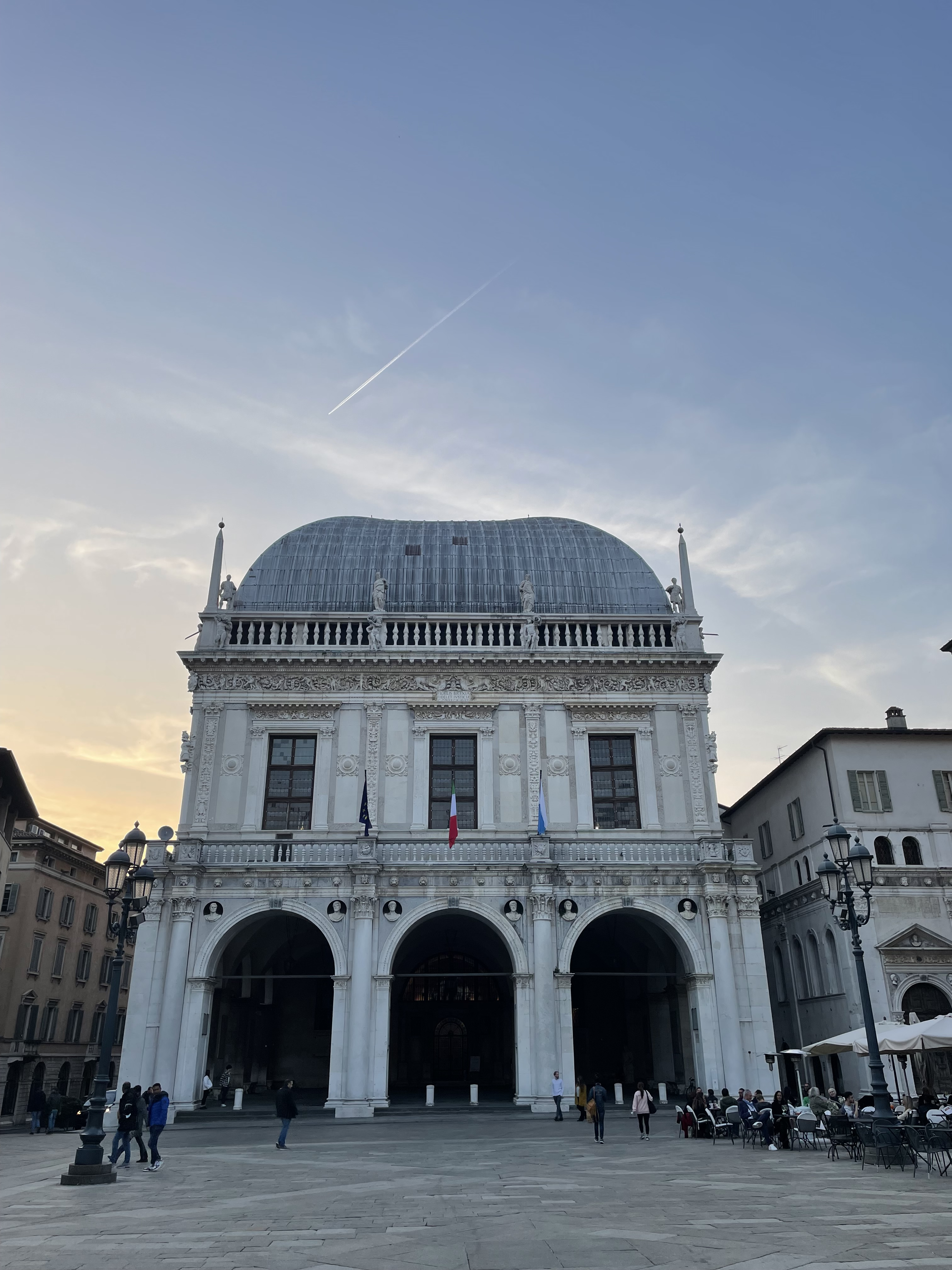
Palazzo della Loggia, Brescia City Hall

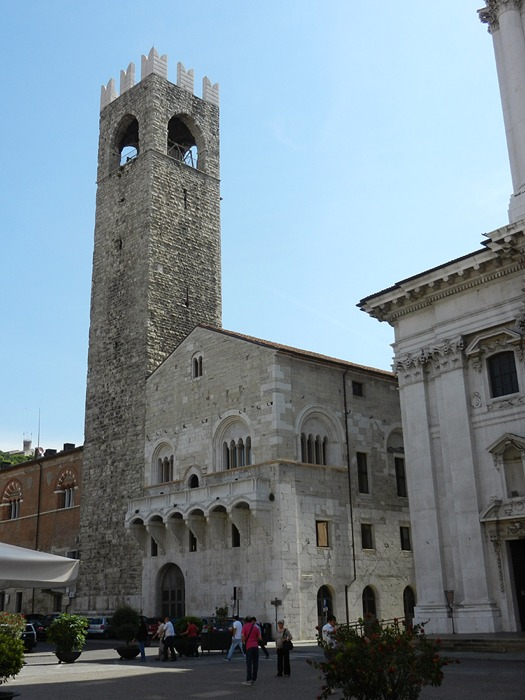
Palazzo Broletto, seat of the Province and of the Prefecture of Brescia

Since local government political reorganization in 1993, Brescia has been governed by the City Council of Brescia, which is based in Palazzo della Loggia. Voters elect directly 32 councilors and the mayor of Brescia every five years.

The City Council chamber in the Palazzo della Loggia, March 2026

Brescia was generally considered in the past one of the most important political bellwether in Italy. Historical stronghold of DC party, in 1994 it was the city in which was firstly experimented the newborn political center-left coalition formed by members of former PCI and DC parties against Silvio Berlusconi's center-right coalition: that year the last secretary of DC and former minister, Mino Martinazzoli, run as mayor with the support of the leftist PDS and won the election defeating the Forza Italia-Lega Nord bloc candidate, endorsed by Berlusconi. This experience is considered even today one of the bases of Romano Prodi's The Olive Tree political coalition.

Since then to 2008 the center-left coalition held the largest number of seats with a partnership administration based on the alliance between the major left-wing, green and independents parties. Anyway, in the 2008 local elections the center-right coalition formed by Silvio Berlusconi's People of Freedom party and the regionalist Lega Nord won for the first time the majority in the City Council. These elections occurred the same day Berlusconi's coalition achieved an outright majority across the country. However, in the 2013 elections the Democratic Party achieved an outright majority across the city and the center-left coalition became again the major force in the City Council. In the 2018 local elections the center-left coalition obtained even the 54% of the votes on the first round and the Democratic Party, which obtained nearly the 35% of the votes, gained 15 seats out of 32 in the City Council. In the 2023 local elections the center-left coalition obtained again the 54% of the votes on the first round.

The current mayor of Brescia is Laura Castelletti, a center-left independent, elected on 20 May 2023. She previously served as deputy mayor for 10 years between 2013 and 2023.

Brescia is also the capital of its own province. The Provincial Council is seated in Palazzo Broletto.

=== Subdivision ===
The city of Brescia is divided into five boroughs called zone. Each zona is subdivided into a different number of quartieri. Here is a list of Brescia's zone and quartieri:

Zona	Population 31 December 2017	Map
Historical Centre	41,856	Zones of Brescia.
North	41,427	Zones of Brescia.
West	37,082	Zones of Brescia.
South	45,360	Zones of Brescia.
East	29,844	Zones of Brescia.
Total	196,305	Zones of Brescia.

Historical Centre

- 1 Brescia Antica
- 2 Borgo Trento
- 3 Porta Milano
- 4 Centro Storico Nord
- 14 Porta Venezia
- 27 Centro Storico Sud
- 30 Crocifissa di Rosa

North

- 11 Mompiano
- 15 Villaggio Prealpino
- 17 San Bartolomeo
- 22 Casazza
- 28 Sant'Eustacchio
- 29 San Rocchino

West

- 5 Chiusure
- 7 Fiumicello
- 21 Urago Mella
- 23 Villaggio Badia
- 25 Villaggio Violino
- 26 Primo Maggio

South

- 6 Don Bosco
- 8 Folzano
- 9 Fornaci
- 10 Lamarmora
- 12 Porta Cremona-Volta
- 20 Chiesanuova
- 24 Villaggio Sereno

East

- 13 Buffalora
- 16 Caionvico
- 18 Sant'Eufemia della Fonte
- 19 San Polo Case
- 31 San Polo Cimabue
- 32 Sanpolino
- 33 San Polo Parco

== Main sights ==
The old town of Brescia (characterized, in the northeast, by a rectangular plan, with the streets that intersect at right angles, a peculiarity handed down from Roman times) has a significant artistic and archaeological heritage, consisting of various monuments ranging from the ancient age to contemporary.

=== UNESCO World Heritage monuments ===
Monumental area with the monastic complex of San Salvatore-Santa Giulia
UNESCO World Heritage Site
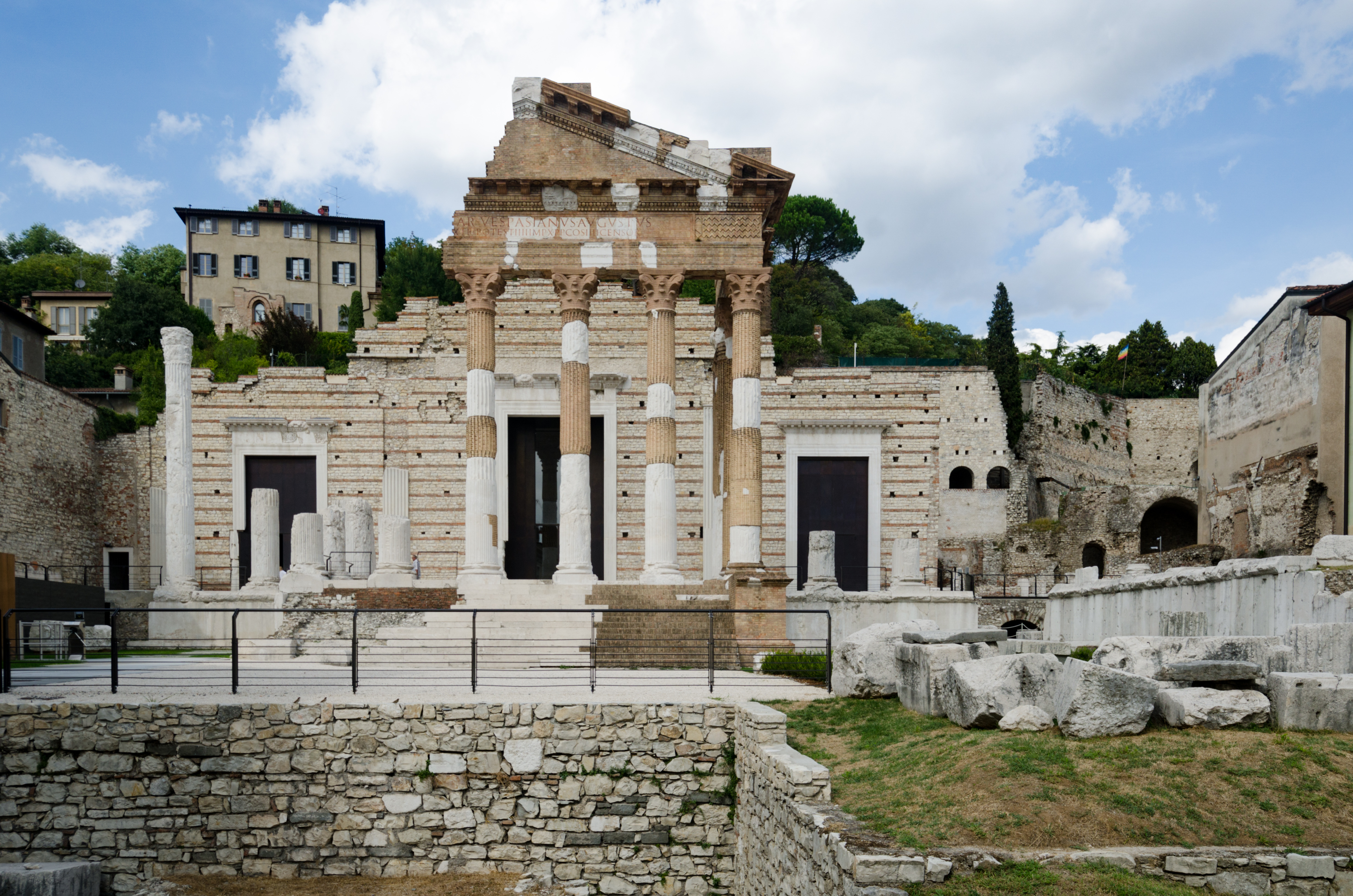
- The Capitolium in the Roman forum
- Interactive map of Monumental area with the monastic complex of San Salvatore-Santa Giulia
- Location: Brescia, Italy
- Part of: Longobards in Italy: Places of Power (568–774 A.D.)
- Criteria: Cultural: (ii), (iii), (vi)
- Reference: 1318-002
- Inscription: 2011 (35th Session)
- Area: 3.75 ha (0.0145 sq mi)
- Buffer zone: 84.13 ha (0.3248 sq mi)
- Coordinates: 45°32′23″N 10°13′41″E

In 2011, UNESCO inscribed the monumental area with the monastic complex of San Salvatore-Santa Giulia in the World Heritage List, belonging to the group known as "Longobards in Italy: Places of Power (568–774 A.D.)".

==== Monumental area of the Roman forum ====
This is the archaeological complex where there are the best-preserved Roman public buildings in the northern Italy, composed of:

- Republican sanctuary

It is under the Capitoline temple. It has been built in the 1st century BC and it is the oldest structure of the forum. It consists of four rectangular rooms next to each other and inside them, there are the remains of the original mosaic floors and the wall frescoes, which from a stylistic point of view and state of preservation are comparable to those of Pompeii. Since the spring of 2015, the western room has opened to the public, while the rest of the building is still undergoing archaeological excavation and restoration.

- Capitolium of Brixia

The primary temple in the city, it was dedicated to the cult of the Capitoline Triad. It was built in 73 AD and consists of three cellae that have preserved much of the original polychrome marble floors, while their interior walls are now a lapidarium displaying ancient Roman epigraphs collected in the 19th century. In front of the cellae, is a fragmentary portico, composed of Corinthian columns that support a pediment containing a dedication to the Emperor Vespasian. Almost entirely buried by a landslide of the Cidneo Hill, it was rediscovered in 1823 through various archaeological campaigns. During excavation in 1826, a splendid bronze statue of a winged Victory was found inside it, likely hidden in late antiquity to preserve it from pillage. After restoration completed in 2013, the site reopened as a new archaeological park.

- Roman theatre

It is located immediately at east of the Capitolium. It has been built in the Flavian era and altered in the 3rd century. With its 86 m (282 ft) diameter, is one of the largest Roman theatres in northern Italy and originally it housed around 15,000 spectators. In the 5th century, an earthquake has heavily damaged the building. In addition, in later centuries, its remains were incorporated into new buildings built on top of it, largely demolished starting from the 19th century. Of the original structure are preserved the semicircular perimeter walls, the two side passages (aditus) and the remains of the proscenium, as well as many fragments of columns and friezes of the scaenae frons. Most of the orchestra and the ima cavea are still below ground. The archaeological excavations should resume in the coming years.

Near the Capitolium is located the Palazzo Maggi Gambara, an aristocratic palace built in the 16th century on top of the west ruins of the Roman theatre.

==== Monastic complex of San Salvatore-Santa Giulia ====
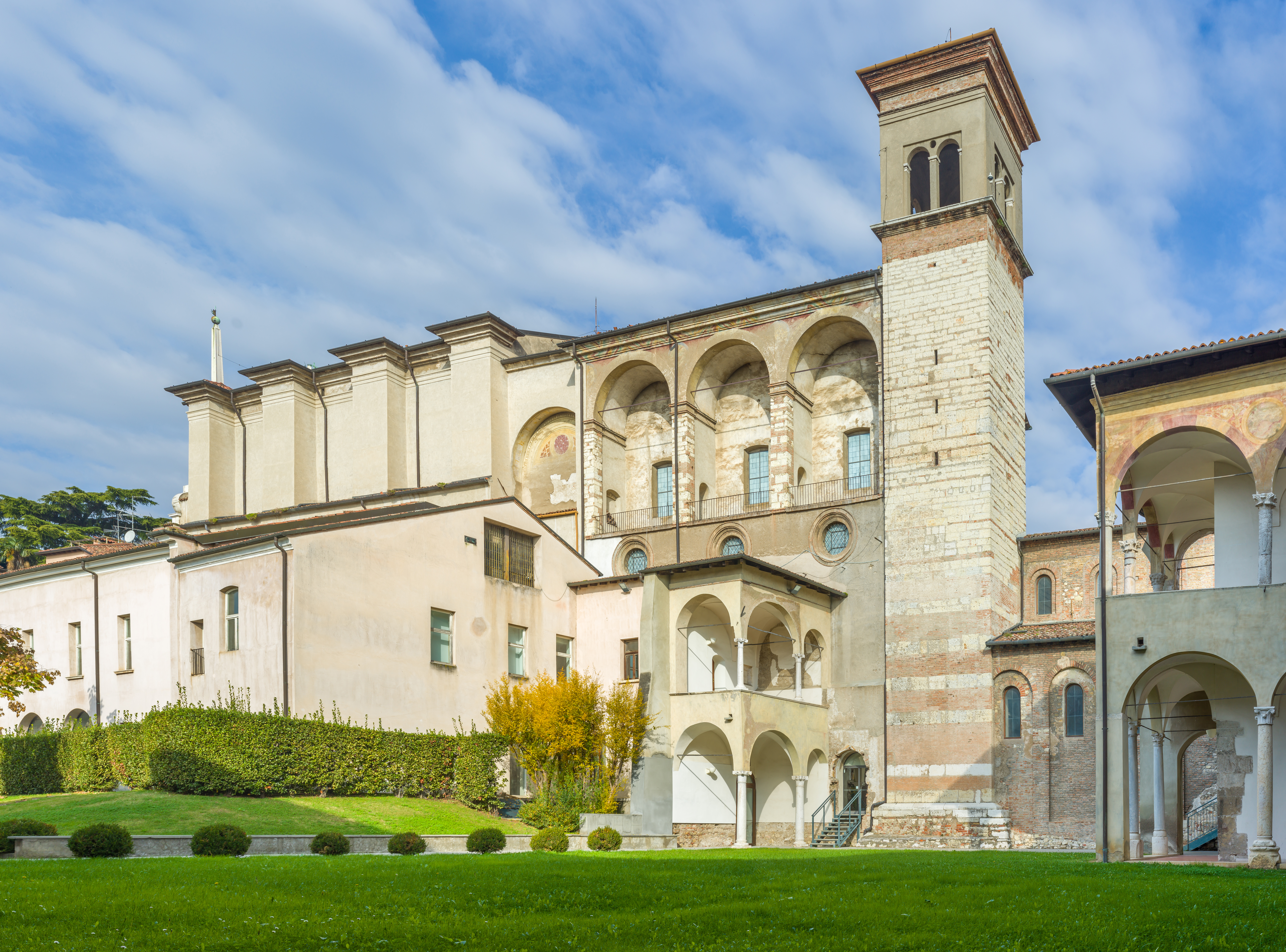
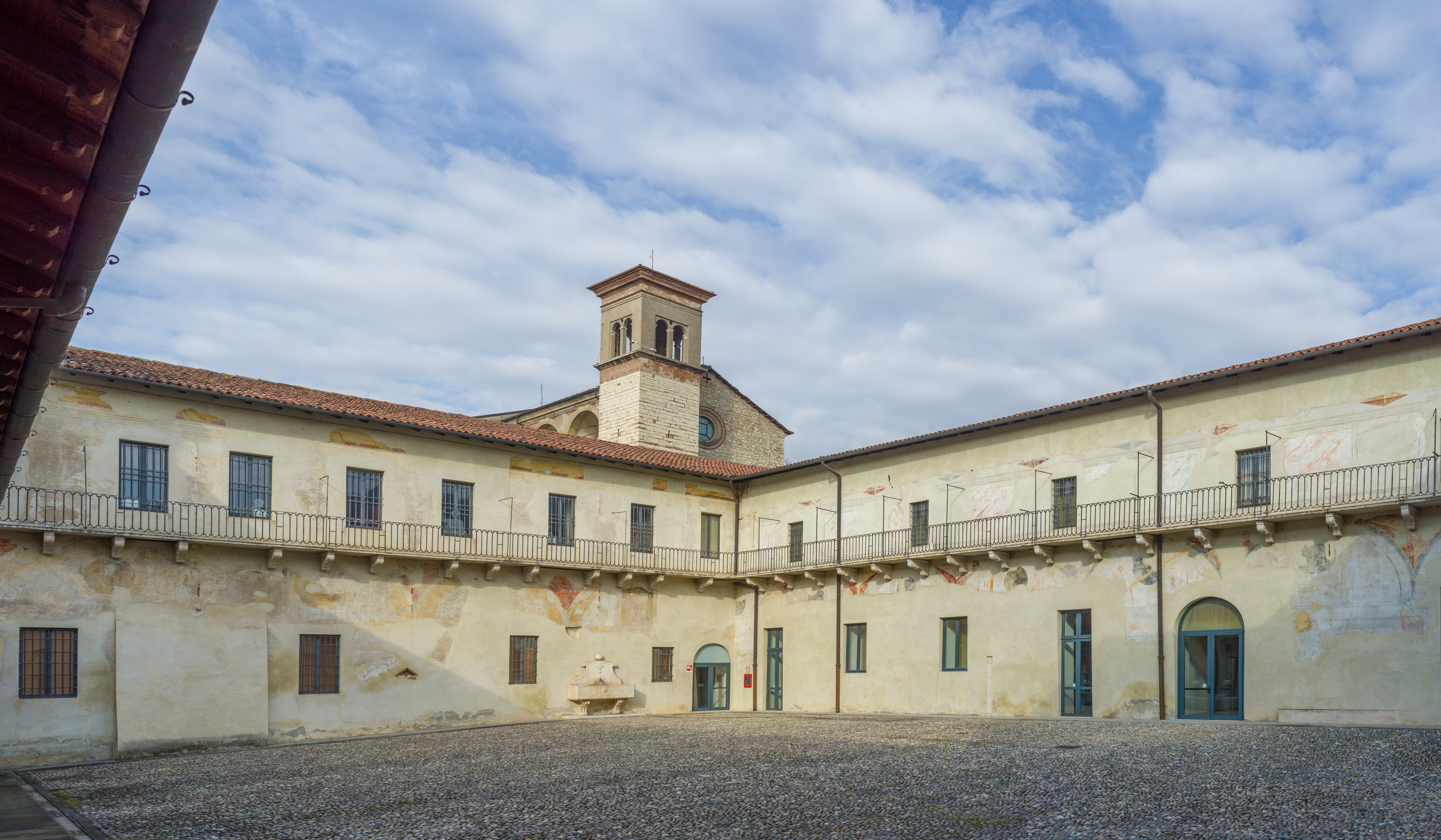
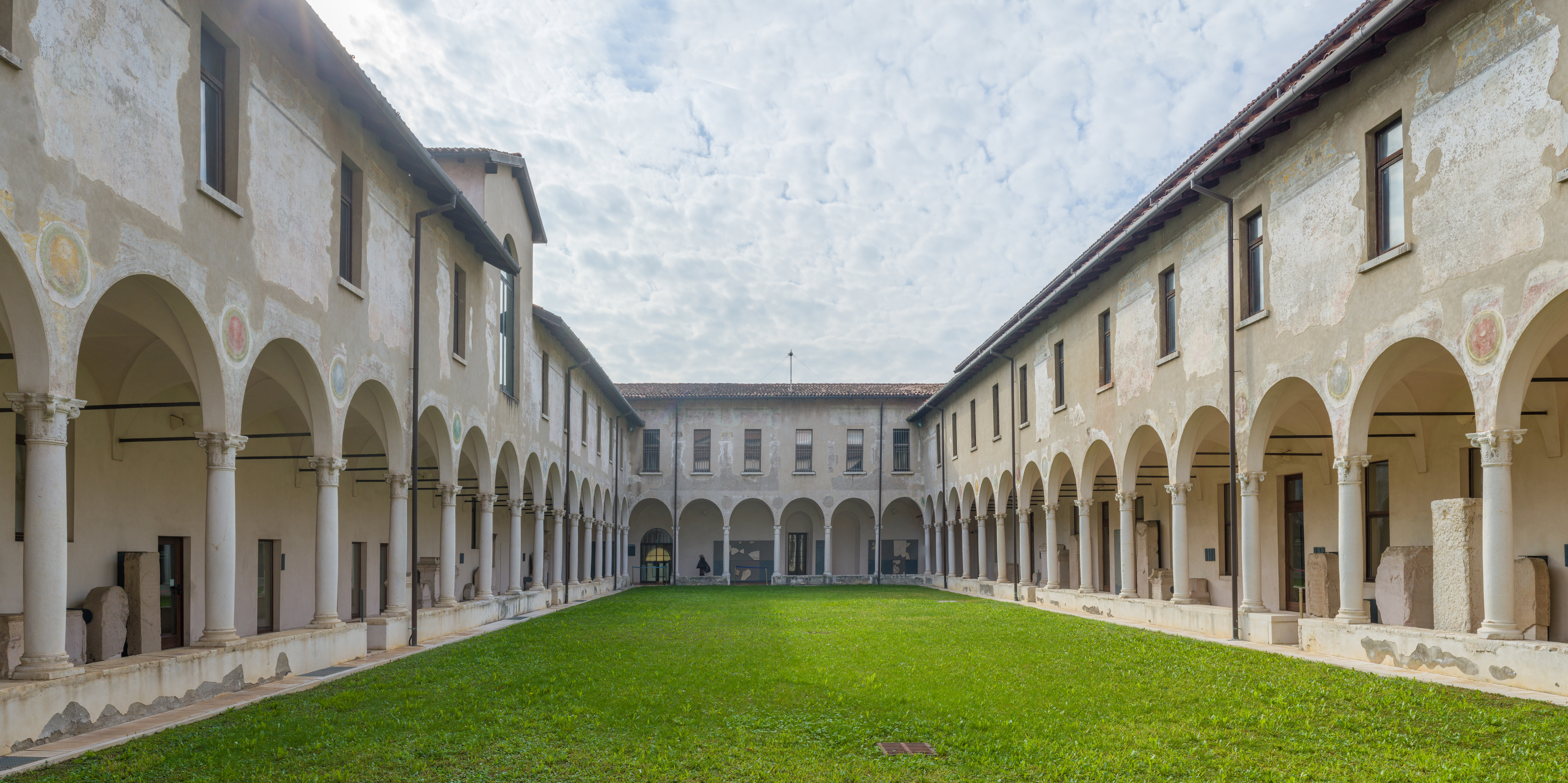
Monastic complex of San Salvatore-Santa Giulia

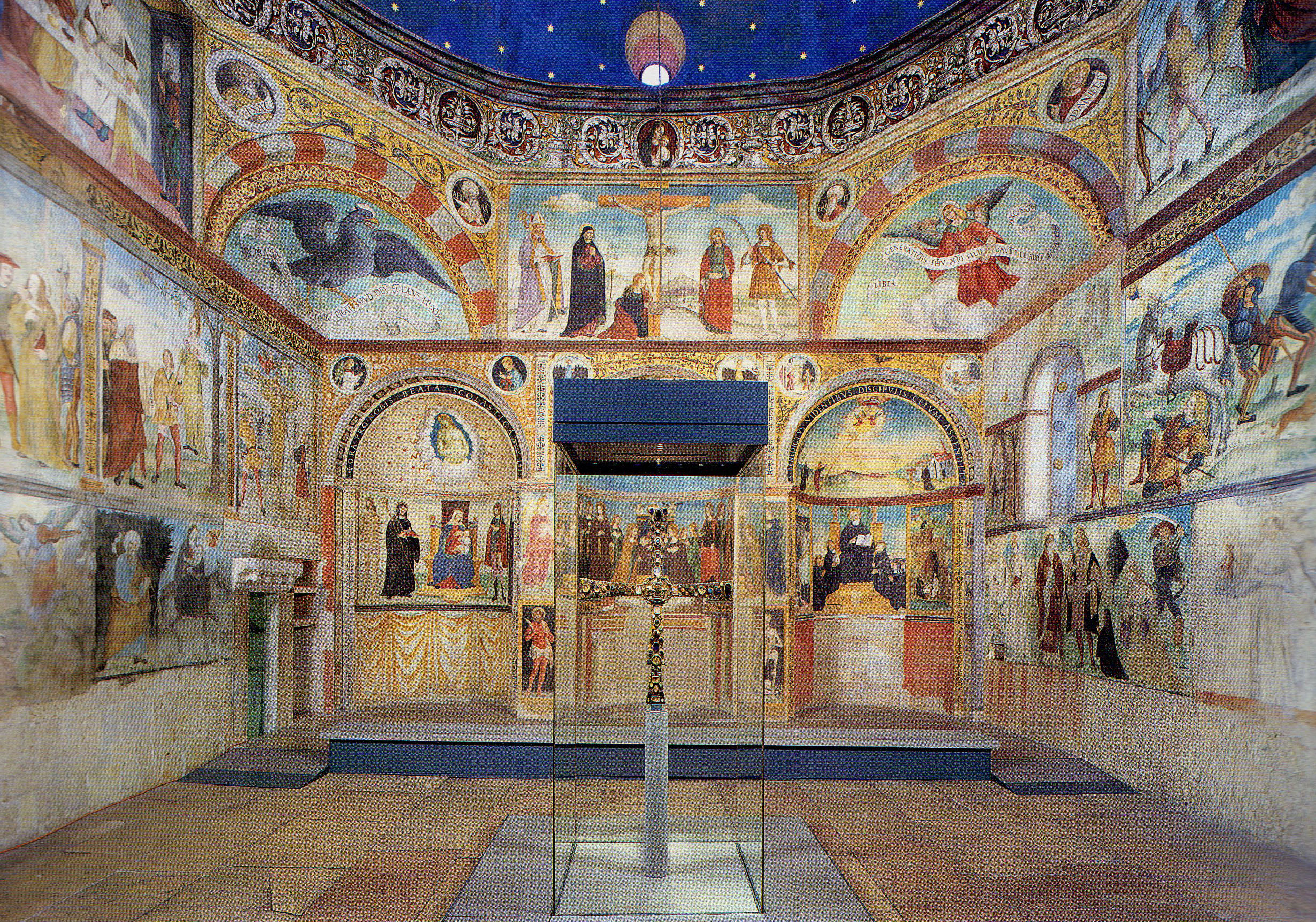
The interior of the church of Santa Maria in Solario with the Cross of Desiderius

Domus dell'Ortaglia, remains of a group of ancient Roman domus

The monastic complex of San Salvatore-Santa Giulia is an outstanding architectural palimpsest, today transformed into the Museo di Santa Giulia, which contains about 11,000 works of art and archaeological finds. During the period of Longobard domination, Princess Anselperga, daughter of King Desiderius, headed the monastery. It consists of:

- Basilica of San Salvatore

It has been built in 753 by Duke of Brescia Desiderius, future Lombard king, and his wife Ansa. It is characterized by the simultaneous use of the Longobards stylistic elements and decorative motifs of classical and Byzantine art and it is one of the most important examples of High Middle Ages architecture in Italy. The basilica has a nave with two apses and has a transept with three apses. It is located over a pre-existing church, which had a single nave and three apses. Expanded in the following centuries, it houses various works of art, including the Stories of St. Obizio painted by Romanino and Stories of the Virgin and the infancy of Christ by Paolo Caylina il Giovane, as well as others from the Carolingian age.

- Church of Santa Maria in Solario

It has been built in the mid-12th century as a chapel inside the monastery. It has a square base with an octagonal lantern and has two internal levels. Four vaults, supported in the centre by an ancient Roman altar, covers the lower floor, while a hemispherical dome covers the upper chamber, that has, into the east wall, three small apses. Inside there are frescoes by Floriano Ferramola and two of the most important pieces of the treasure of the ancient monastery: the Brescia Casket (that consists of a small ivory box dating the 4th century) and the Cross of Desiderius (made of silver and gold plate, studded with 212 precious gems).

- The nuns' choir

It is placed between the Basilica of San Salvatore and the church of Santa Giulia. It has been built between the late 15th and early 16th century and it is on two levels. The lower level is the old churchyard covered for access to the basilica. The upper floor is the real choir, made up by a room covered by a barrel vault, which is connected to the east with San Salvatore by three small windows with a grating, on the west by Santa Giulia through an arch. The interior of the choir is entirely decorated with frescoes painted by Ferramola and Caylina, and inside are shown different funerary monuments of the Venetian age, including the Martinengo Mausoleum, a masterpiece of the Renaissance sculpture in Lombardy.

- Church of Santa Giulia

It has been built between 1593 and 1599. The façade, made of Botticino marble, is decorated with a double row of pilasters of the Corinthian order, separated by a rich marble frieze and connected to the sides by volutes. The inside consists of a spacious nave covered with a barrel vault. In the church, there are no sacred furniture and there are only a few scraps of the frescoes that originally decorated each surface. Although annexed to the monastery, it is not part of the Museo di Santa Giulia and is used as a conference room.

In the former vegetable garden of this monastery have been discovered a group of Roman domus called Domus dell'Ortaglia that were used between the 1st and 4th centuries and they are some of the best preserved domus in northern Italy.

=== Other sights ===
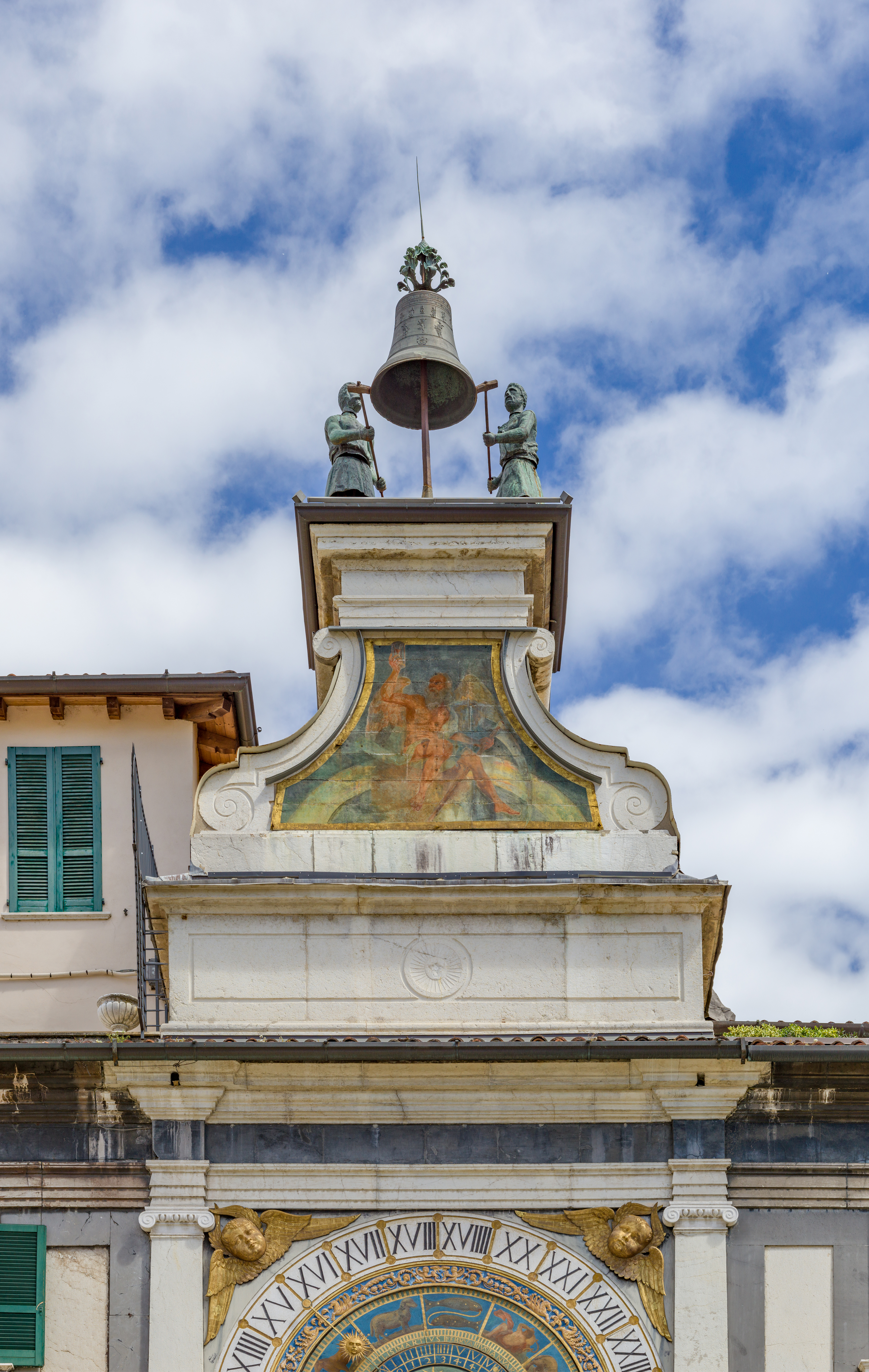
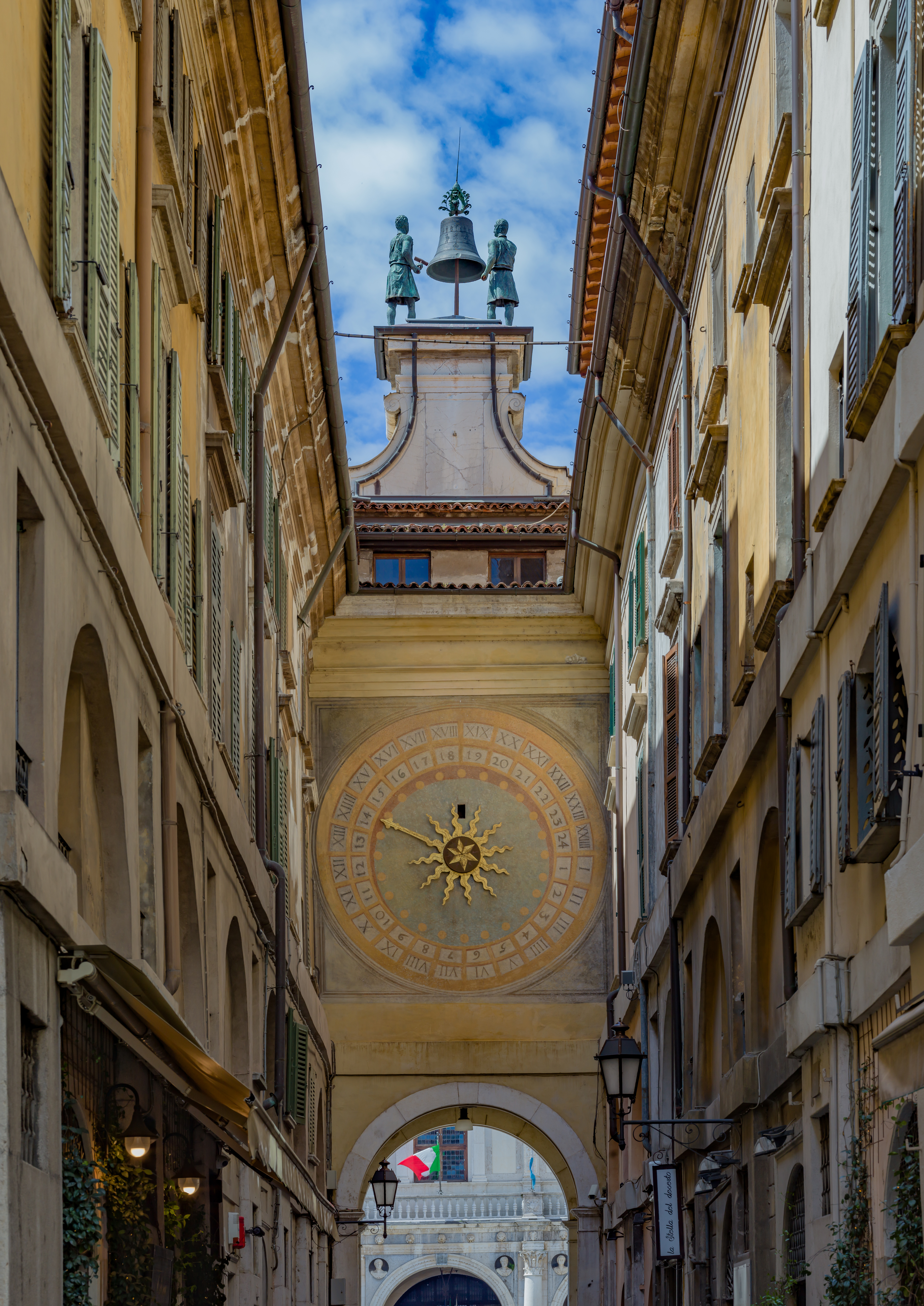
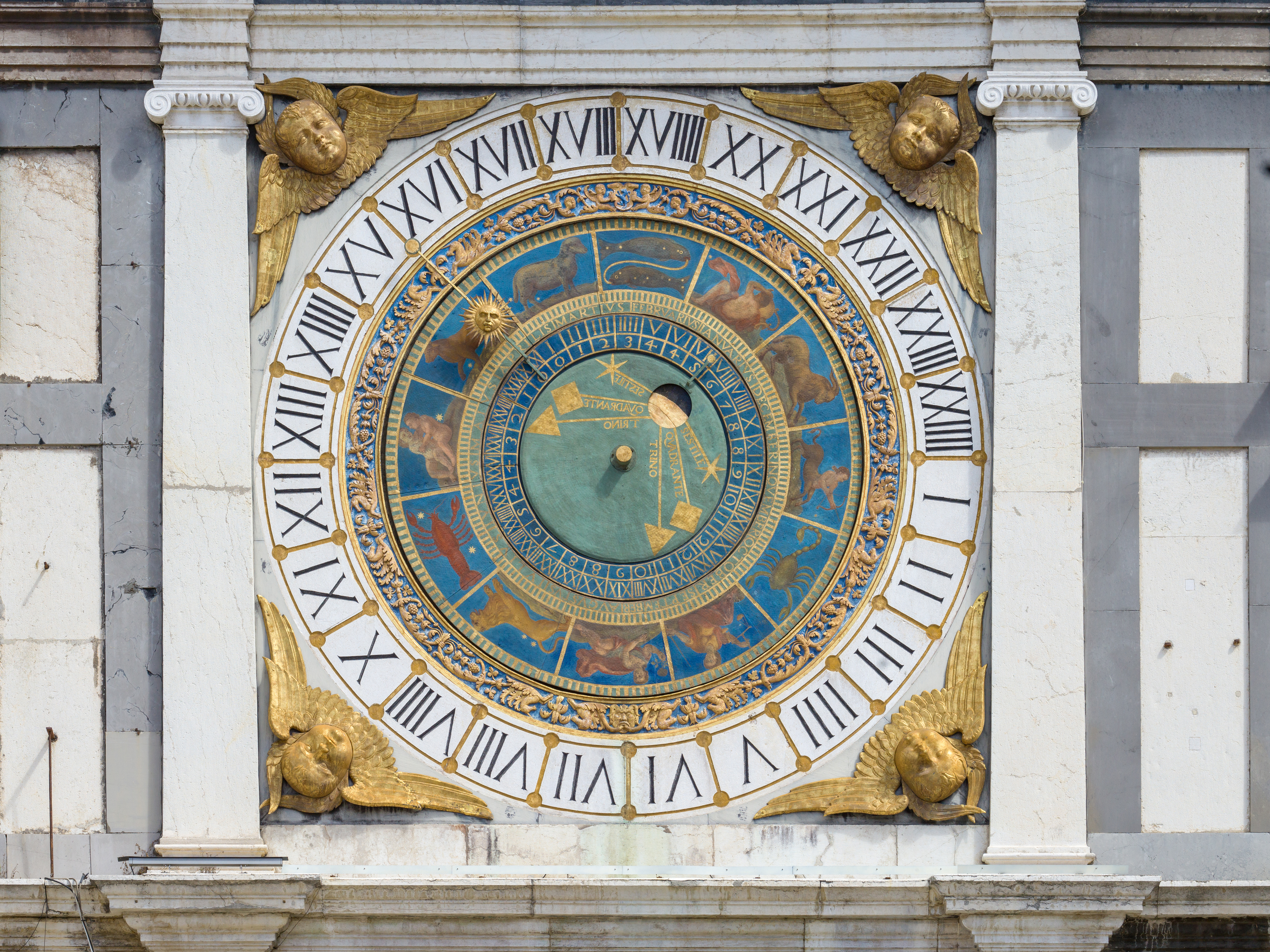
Palazzo Monte di Pietà in Piazza della Loggia and the Torre dell'Orologio with the astronomical clock

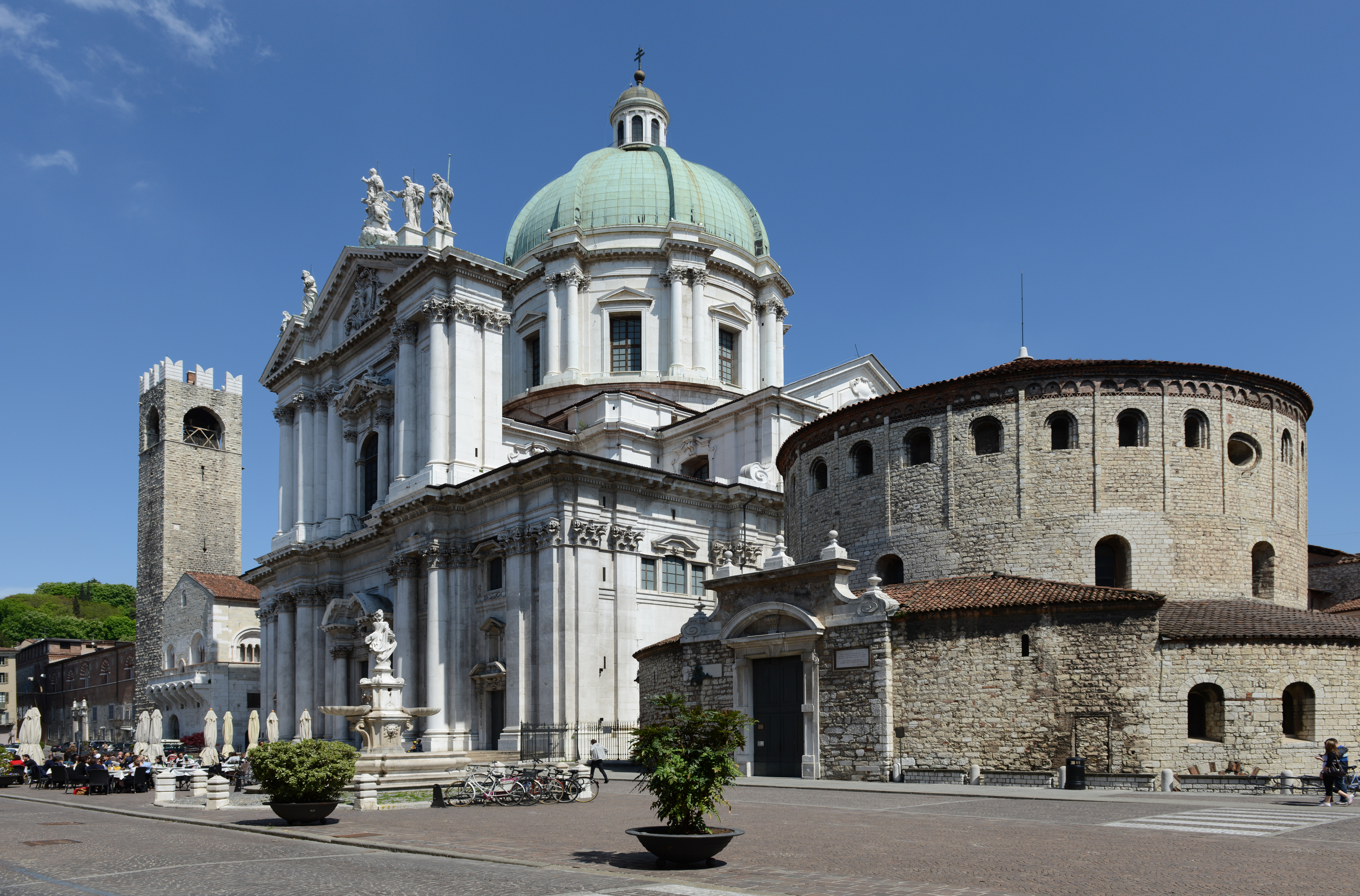
The two cathedrals of Brescia: the Old (at right) and the New (at left)

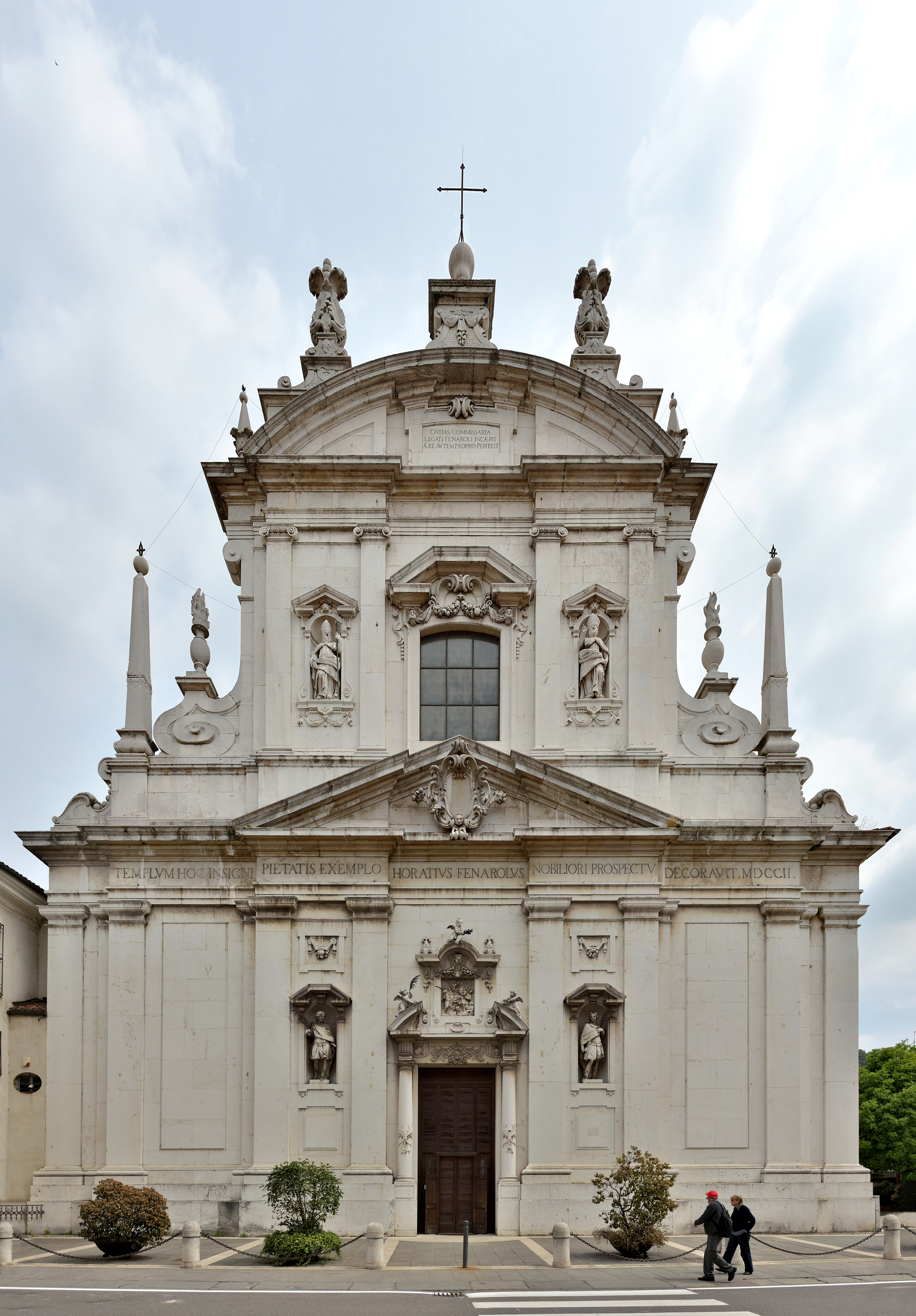
The church of San Faustino and Giovita

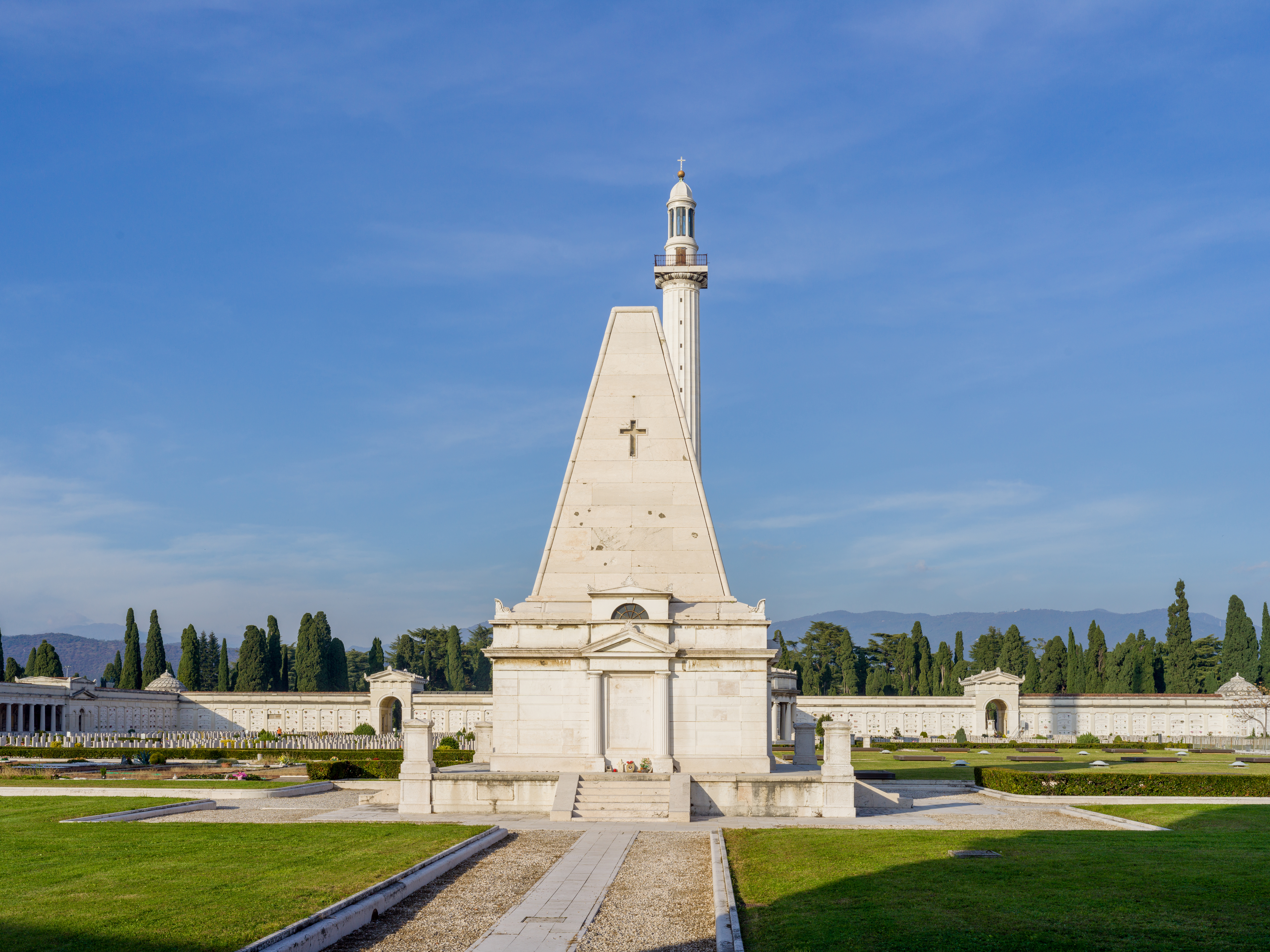
The Monumental Cemetery and the Lighthouse of Brescia

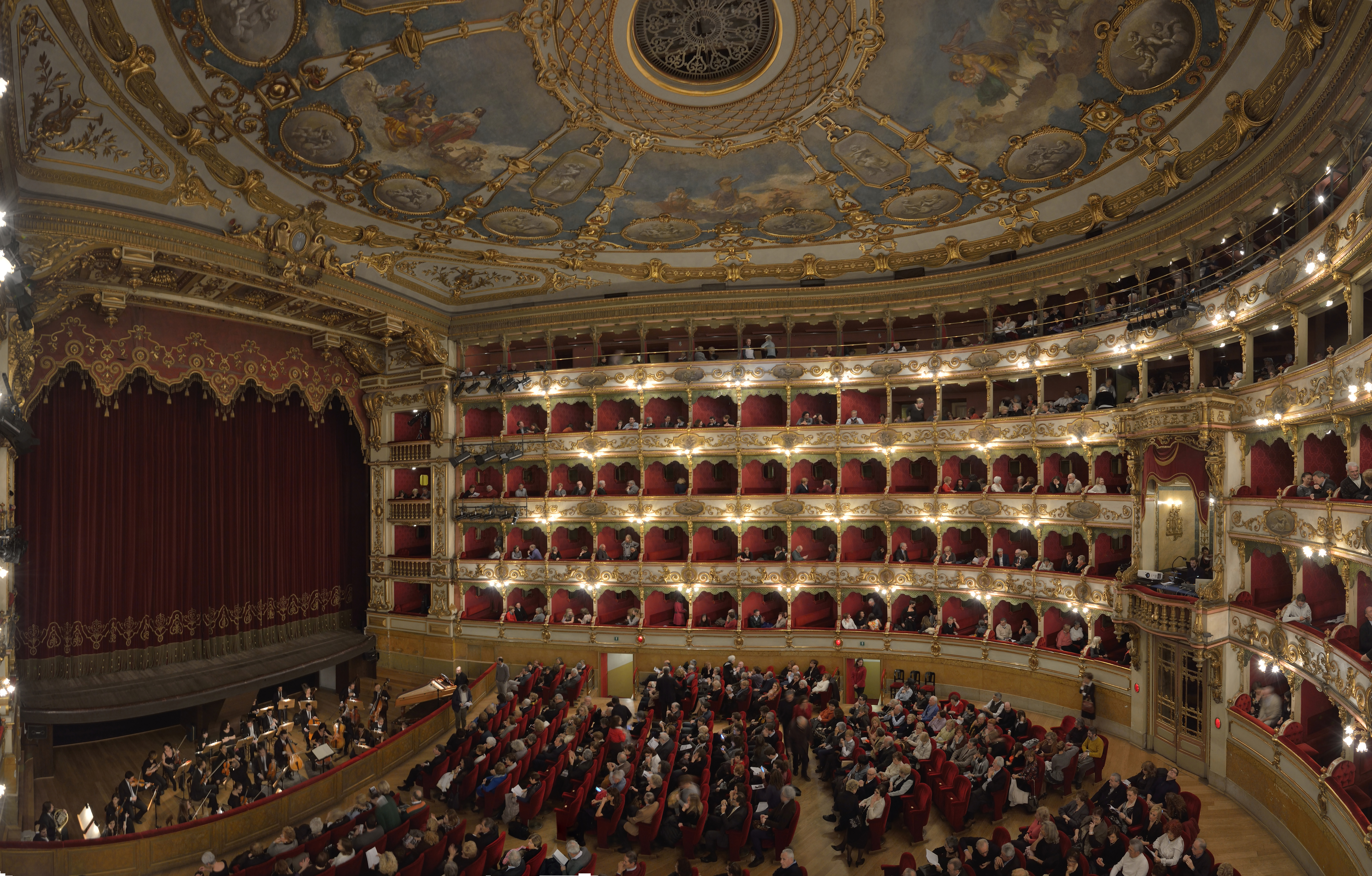
Teatro Grande

Piazza Arnaldo

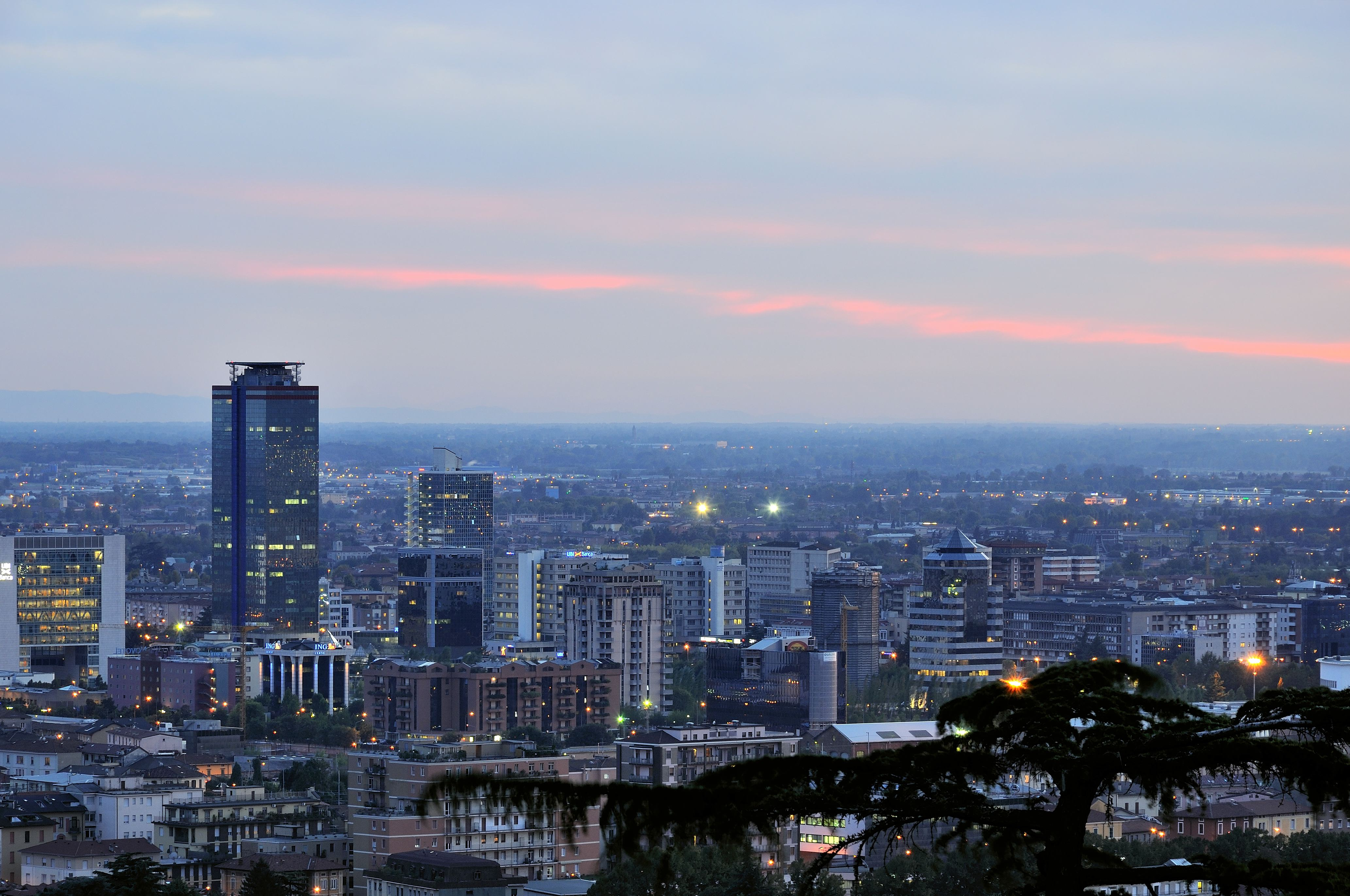
A view of Brescia Due with its skyscrapers: the tallest one is the Crystal Palace.

- Piazza della Loggia, an example of Renaissance piazza, with the eponymous Palazzo della Loggia (current Town Hall). Construction began in 1492 under the direction of Filippo de' Grassi and it was completed only in the 16th century by Sansovino and Palladio. Vanvitelli designed the upper room of the palace (1769). On the south side of the square are two 15th–16th century Monti di Pietà (Christian lending houses). Their façades are embedded with ancient Roman tombstones, one of oldest antique lapidary displays in Italy. At the centre of the east side of the square stands the Torre dell'Orologio, a tower with a large astronomical clock (mid-16th-century) on top of which there are two copper anthropomorphic automata which strike the hours on a bell. On 28 May 1974, the square was targeted by the terrorist bombing.
- Duomo Vecchio: the Old Cathedral, also known as La Rotonda, is a circular 11th-century Romanesque church. The main structure, with rustic exteriors, was built atop ruins of an earlier basilica. Near the entrance is the pink marble sarcophagus of Berardo Maggi, while in the presbytery is the entrance to the crypt of San Filastrio. The structure houses masterworks by Alessandro Bonvicino (il Moretto); Girolamo Romanino, Palma il Giovane, Francesco Maffei, and others.
- Duomo Nuovo: construction of the New Cathedral began in 1604 and it was only completed in 1825. Initially designed by Palladio, economic shortfalls led to younger local architects and artists completing initial work, including decorations by Pietro Maria Bagnadore. The interior has major frescoes by Il Moretto. The high altarpiece is by Jacopo Zoboli (1735). The main attraction is the Ark of Sts Apollonius and Filastrius (1510).
- Broletto: the 12th-and 13th-century Town Hall, now houses offices of both the commune and province. On the Piazza front is the balcony from where the medieval city officials spoke to the townsfolk; on the north side, rises a tall tower called "Tower of Pégol" or "Tower of the People" (the Lombard: Tòr del Pégol), whose bells were once used to summon the citizens in moments of distress.
- Piazza della Vittoria, an example of Italian Art Déco architecture. It was built between 1927 and 1932 by architect Marcello Piacentini through the demolition of part of the medieval old town and it has an L-shape. On the inside corner right there is the Torrione INA, the first skyscraper built in Italy. In the north background there is the large Palazzo delle poste ("Post Office building"), with its ocher-white two-tone upholstery. The Torre della Rivoluzione ("Tower of the Revolution") and three other buildings, recalling the classical architecture, complete the square.
- Piazza del Foro: site of the Roman forum. In addition to the already mentioned Capitolium, republican sanctuary and Roman theatre, various other remains are visible in the area. Among these, on the south side of the square, are scanty remains of a building called the curia, which may have been a basilica.
- Palazzo Martinengo Cesaresco Novarino: mid-17th-century palace, now home to art exhibitions and an underground archaeological exhibit, depicting city's history from the early Iron Age to the present day, concentrating in a single place 3,000 years of urban history of Brescia.
- Santa Maria dei Miracoli: (1488–1523) church with fine façade by Giovanni Antonio Amadeo, decorated with bas-reliefs and a Renaissance peristilium. It is considered a jewel of Renaissance sculpture in Lombardy.
- San Francesco: Romanesque-Gothic church and cloisters.
- Castle of Brescia: also known as Falcone d'Italia ("Falcon of Italy"), it is located atop Cidneo Hill in the northeast corner of the town. The castle was built between the 13th and the 16th century, and it is among the largest castles in Italy. Besides commanding a fine view of the city and a large part of the surrounding area, as well as being a local favorite recreational area, it hosts the Arms Museum, with a fine collection of weapons from the Middle Ages onwards; the Risorgimento Museum, dedicated to the Italian independence wars of the 19th century; an exhibition of model railroads; and an astronomical observatory.
- Santi Nazaro e Celso: church housing the Averoldi Polyptych by Titian.
- San Faustino e Giovita: church also known as San Faustino Maggiore. The interior has a fresco depicting Apotheosis of Sts Faustino, Jovita, Benedict and Scholastica by Giandomenico Tiepolo.
- Basilica of Santa Maria delle Grazie: basilica church built between the 16th and 17th centuries with Baroque frescoes and stucco, and a work of Il Moretto.
- San Giuseppe: 16th-century church houses frescoes and decoration including fourteen Stations of the Cross of St. Joseph (1713) by Giovanni Antonio Capello. The church houses the tombs of Gasparo da Salò, one of the inventors of the modern violin and Benedetto Marcello, Baroque musician. Inside it, there is one of the oldest organs in the world.
- San Clemente: church with paintings by Bonvicino.
- Torre della Pallata: massive tower built in 1254 as part of the medieval walls. In the 15th century, the clock, merlons, and turret added. The fountain on the western side was designed in 1597 by Bagnadore.
- San Giovanni: church with a refectory painted jointly by il Moretto and il Romanino.
- San Marco Evangelista: a small 13th-century Romanesque-style church.
- San Mattia alle Grazie: a suppressed 13th-century former church.
- Monumental Cemetery: also known as Vantiniano, is the largest cemetery in Brescia, designed around 1813 by Rodolfo Vantini. It is the first monumental cemetery built in Italy and at its centre stands the Lighthouse of Brescia (60 meters tall) which has inspired the architect Heinrich Strack for the design of the Berlin Victory Column.
- Teatro Grande: opera house renovated several times between the mid-17th and mid-19th century. The name Grande ("Big") is derived from the former name Il Grande ("The Great") in honour of Napoleon Bonaparte. The horseshoe-shaped auditorium is richly decorated and has five galleries. Since 1912, the theatre is a national monument.
- Biblioteca Queriniana, containing rare early manuscripts, including the Codex Brixianus, a 14th-century manuscript of Dante, and some rare incunabula.
- Brescia Due: a business district located in the southern part of the city.
- Crystal Palace: as a part of Brescia Due, is the tallest habitable structure of the city with a height of 110 m (360 ft), it was built by the architect Bruno Fedrigolli between 1988 and 1992 and according to the first project this skyscraper would have been the tallest one in Italy.

The city has no fewer than seventy-two public fountains. The stone quarries of Botticino, 8 km (5 mi) east of Brescia, supplied marble for the Monument to Vittorio Emanuele II in Rome.

=== Museums ===
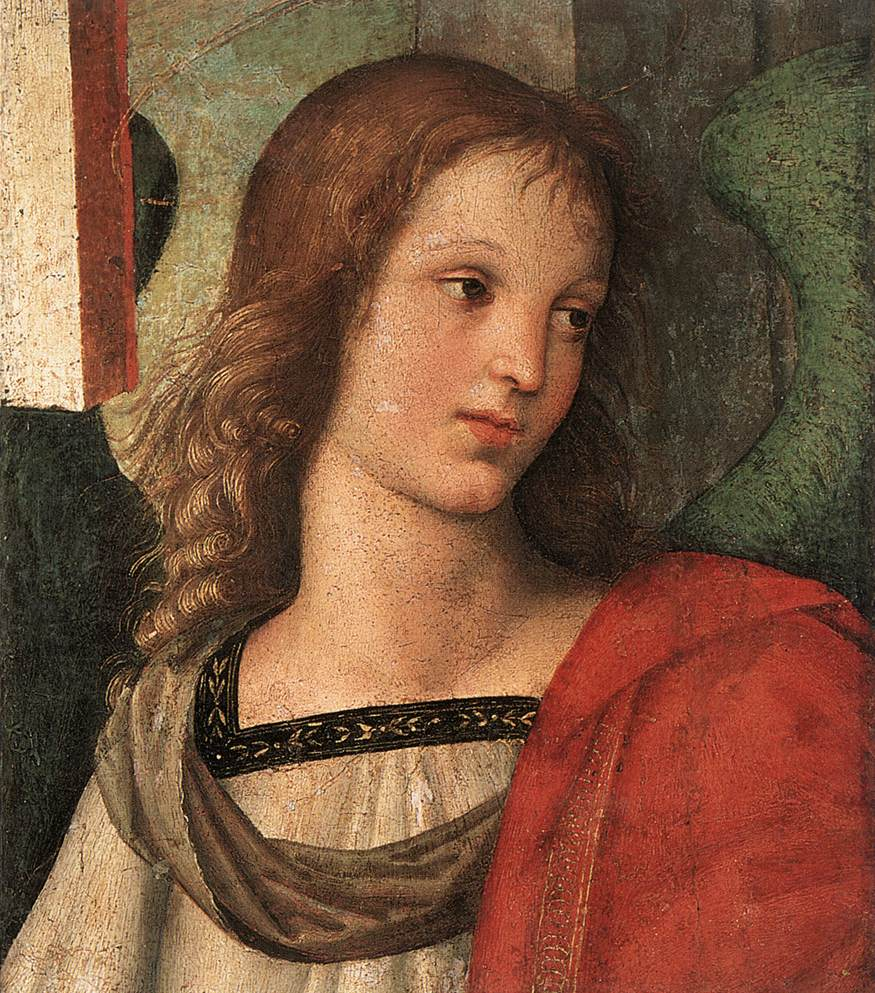
Pinacoteca Tosio Martinengo: Angel by Raphael

The most important museums of Brescia are the following:

- Museo di Santa Giulia ("Santa Giulia Museum"): it is the city Museum, situated in the monastic complex of San Salvatore-Santa Giulia, which has a rich Roman section. One of the masterpieces is the bronze statue of a winged Victory, originally probably a Venus, converted in antiquity into the Victory by adding the wings; it is said to be in the act of writing the winner's name on her shield (now lost). Also very interesting, one of the very few places in the world where the remains of two Roman domus can be visited on their original site simply by strolling into one of the museum halls.
- Pinacoteca Tosio Martinengo, the municipal art gallery; it hosts works of the painters of the Renaissance Brescian school, Girolamo Romanino, Alessandro Bonvicino and Giovanni Battista Moroni. After an extensive remodeling the museum reopened in 2018 with a refreshed interior showcasing the art hung on contemporary fabric covered walls.
- Museo della Mille Miglia ("Mille Miglia Museum"). Situated inside the former Monastery of S. Eufemia, the museum celebrates the history of the 1,600-kilometre (1,000 mi) car race from Brescia to Rome and back that began in 1927. It shows films, memorabilia, dresses, posters, and a number of classic cars that are periodically replaced by other in case of participation in events.
- Museo Diocesano di Brescia ("Diocesan Museum of Brescia"). It is located in the former Monastery of St. Joseph and houses a permanent collection of sacred artworks, including paintings, illuminated manuscripts, as well as one of the most extensive collections of vestments in Italy.
- Museo Nazionale della fotografia ("National Museum of Photography"). It hosts a collection of photographic and cinematographic machines, along with various camera accessories and a photo library with about 60,000 photographs.
- Museo delle Armi "Luigi Marzoli" ("Luigi Marzoli" Arms Museum"). Located in the Castle, it is one of the most important European collections of old armour and weaponry. It hosts about 600 pieces of armour, weapons and firearms from the 15th to the 19th century.
- Museo degli strumenti musicali e della liuteria bresciana ("Museum of the Musical Instruments and Brescian lutherie"). It hosts string and wind instruments, as well as a rich collection of choirbooks and musical scores.
- Collezione Paolo VI – arte contemporanea ("Paul VI Collection – Contemporary Art"). It is located in Concesio, on the northern outskirts of Brescia, and hosts the contemporary art collection of Pope Paul VI, composed of about 7,000 works of many famous artists, including Matisse, Chagall, Picasso, Dalí and others. It was opened on 8 November 2009, inaugurated by Pope Benedict XVI.

Besides these, there are other museums in Brescia:

- Museo del Risorgimento ("Risorgimento Museum")
- Ma.Co.f. – Centro della fotografia italiana ("Centre of Italian photography")
- Museo del Ferro – Museo dell'Industria e del Lavoro ("Museum of Industry and Labour")
- The Beatles Museum
- Museo Ken Damy della Fotografia contemporanea
- AmbienteParco – Museo dell'Acqua ("Water Museum")
- Museo di Scienze Naturali ("Natural Science Museum")
- Museo Piamarta – Istituto Artigianeli
- Casa Museo Paolo VI di Concesio

=== Parks ===
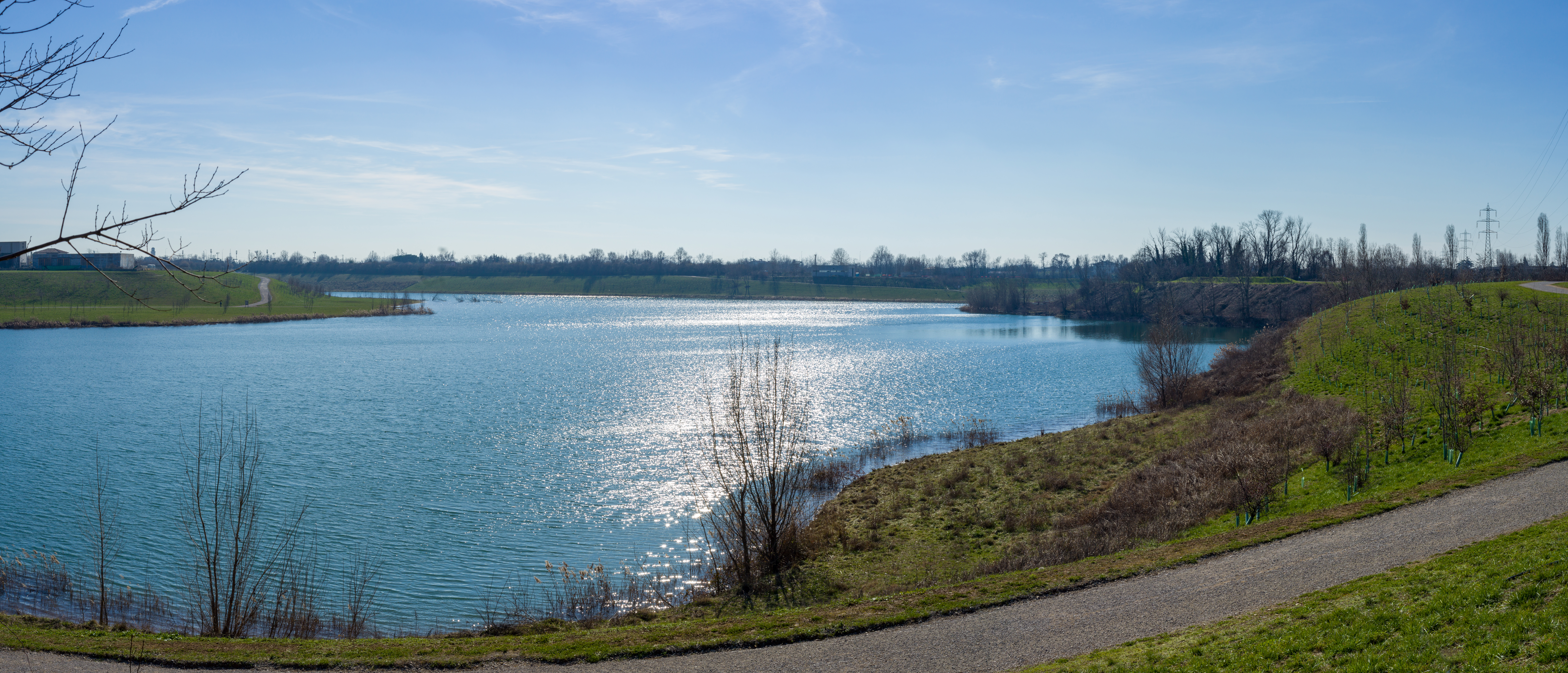
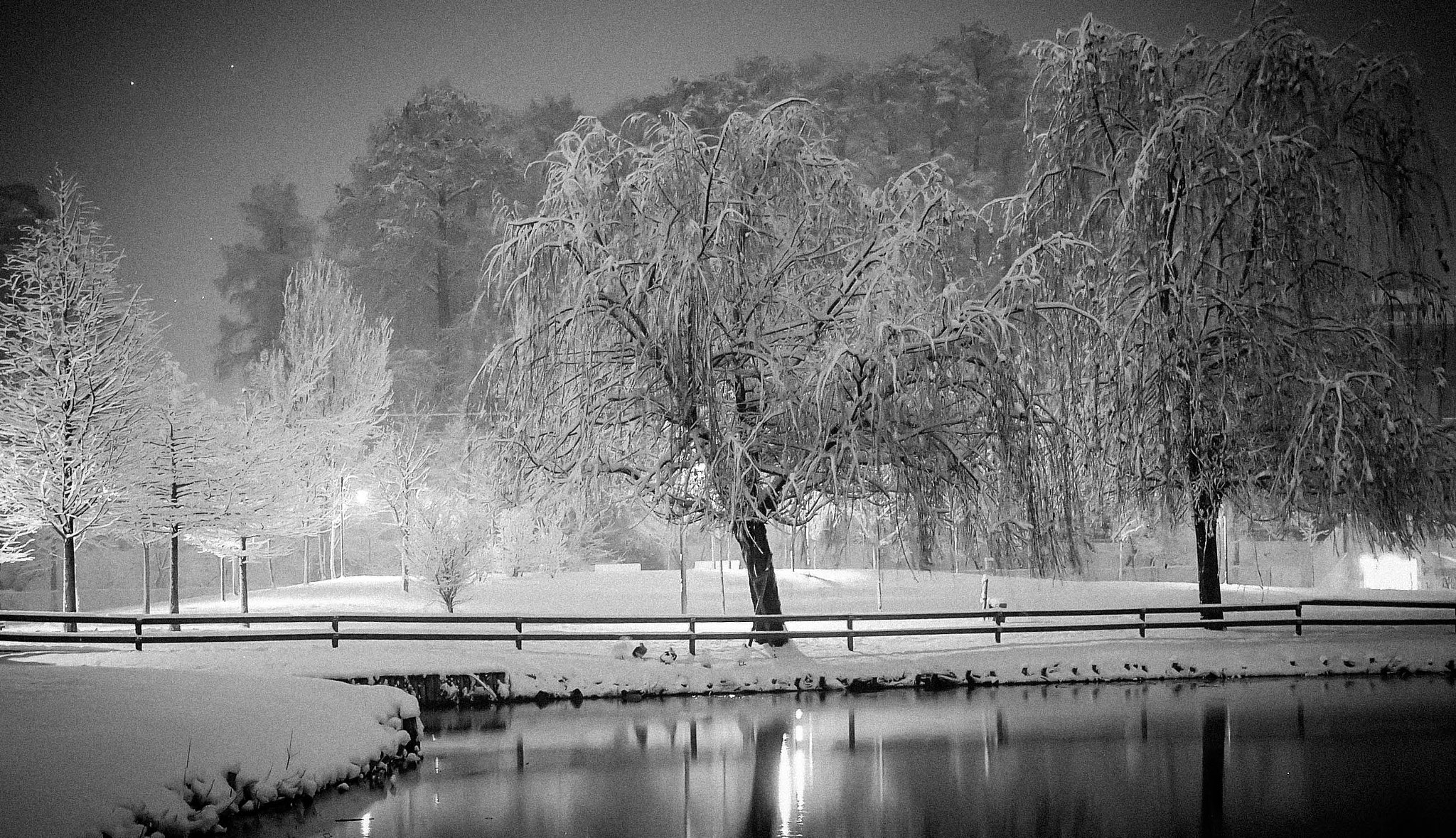
From left to right: Parco delle Cave, Parco Mazzolari and Parco Ducos in winter

Due to its location in the foothills of the Alps, Brescia has forests close to the city centre. About 80% of its municipal territory is covered by woodlands and farmlands: total amount of public green space is 26.3 square kilometres (10.2 sq mi), or 134 square metres (1,440 sq ft) per inhabitant, while agricultural zones cover an area of 45.6 square kilometres (17.6 sq mi).

The largest park of Brescia is Parco delle Colline di Brescia ("Brescia Hills Park") that has a total surface of 43.09 square kilometres (16.64 mi^{2}), of which 21.83 square kilometres (8.43 mi^{2}) fall within the city limits. The park was established in 2000 with the purpose of preserving, safeguarding, and enhancing the natural heritage of the hills surrounding Brescia. Woods cover about 70% of the surface of the park; the rest consists of meadows, vineyard and olive plantations. The most common plants in the park are hop-hornbeam, downy oak, sweet chestnut, manna ash, but there is also the presence of Mediterranean species such as terebinth, tree heath, bay laurel and holm oak. The fauna of the park includes foxes, European badgers, wild boars and other mammals, while the most common birds are robins, blackbirds, blackcaps and wrens.

In 2018 another public park known as Parco delle Cave was opened on the site of former sand quarries in the south of the city. After the full opening at the end of 2021, now the park covers an area of 2 km^{2} (490 acres).

Other parks are scattered throughout the city, such as Parco del Castello ("Castle Park"), Parco Tarello, Parco Mazzolari, Parco Ducos and Campo di Marte.

== Economy ==
The city is at the centre of the third largest Italian industrial area. The local Confindustria, the AIB – Associazione Industriale Bresciana (Industrial Association of Brescia), was the first industry association founded in Italy in 1897. The Brescian companies are typically a small or medium-sized, often family-run, ranging from the food to the engineering industry.

=== Agriculture ===
Vineyards in the middle of the city with an extension of 4 ha (9.9 acres)

The viticulture is the most important agricultural sector of the Brescian food system. The municipality of Brescia is part of the production areas of five different wines: a DOCG wine, i.e. the Franciacorta, three DOC wines (Botticino, Cellatica and Curtefranca) and an IGT wine (Ronchi di Brescia). In addition, in its old town, along the northern slope of the Cidneo Hill, there is the largest urban vineyard in Europe, characterized by the cultivation of Invernenga, a local white grape variety present in Brescia since Roman times.

Another very important sector is the production of olive oil, especially in the nearby area of Lake Garda. The European Union has recorded as PDO two typologies of extra virgin olive oils and they are Garda and Laghi lombardi.

Brescia is also the homeland of Italian caviar. In Calvisano, about 30 kilometres (19 mi) south of the city centre, is located the world's largest sturgeons farm that produces annually 25 tonnes (25 long tons; 28 short tons) of caviar exported all over the world.

=== Industry and services ===
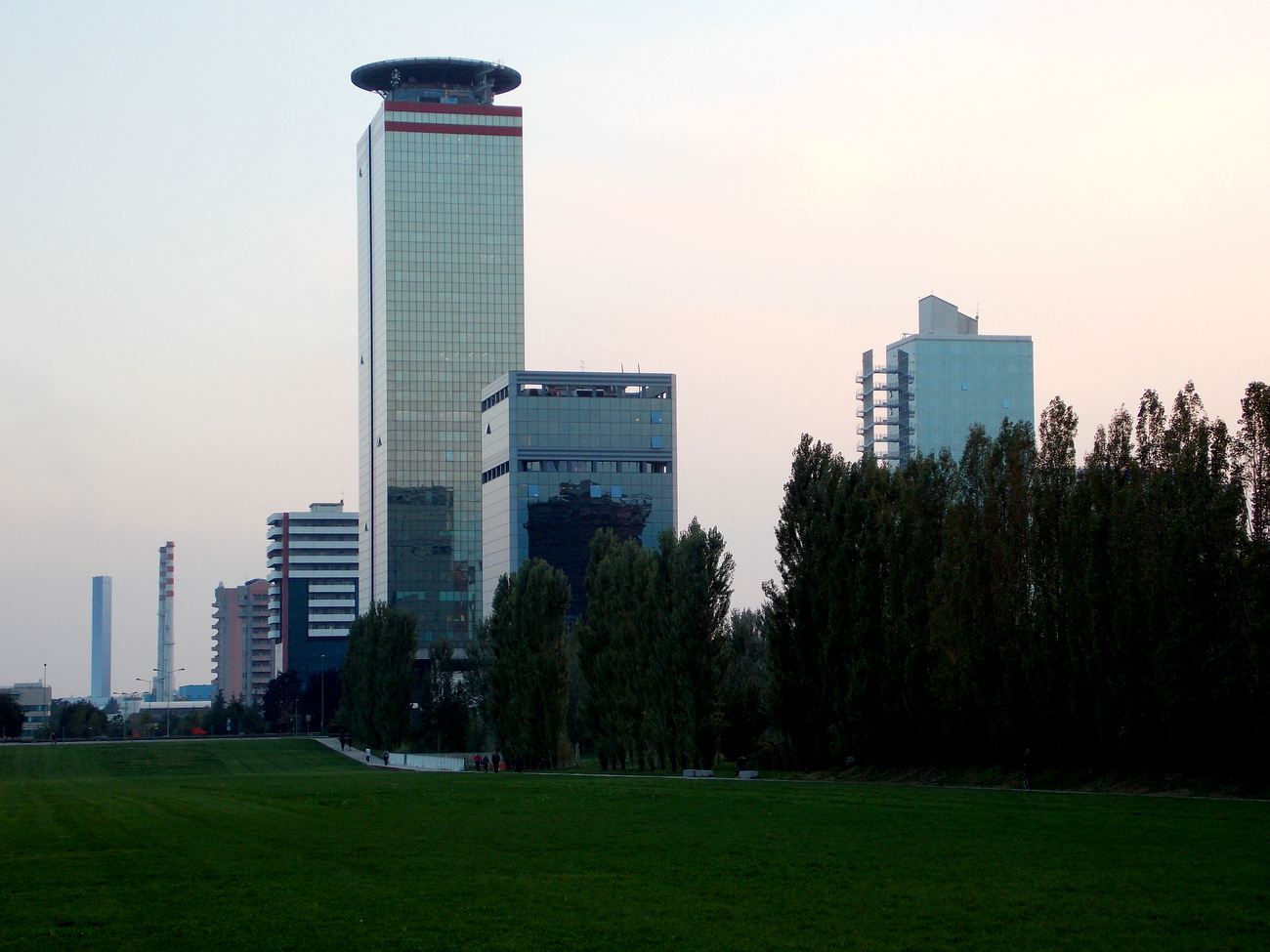
The business district of Brescia

The main industrial activities of Brescia are those mechanical, specialized in the production and distribution of machine tools. Also important is the production of motor vehicle, represented by the OM, which is the manufacturer of Iveco trucks, and the production of weapons, among which the Fausti, Beretta, Fabarm and Perazzi. Very important is the metallurgical industry. On the outskirts of town, there are two steel mills: the "Alfa Acciai" and "Ori Martin". Other crucial industrial activities are the production of cutlery and faucets, along with the textile, footwear and clothing, as well as the production of building materials and bricks. The intense industrial development has resulted in a high level of pollution in the outskirts of the city located near the disused chemical factory "Caffaro" that produced PCB. For this reason, this part of the city is in the list of SIN – Siti di Interesse Nazionale (Sites of National Interest). According to a study carried out by the Edison Foundation and Confindustria in 2015, Brescia is the province with the highest value added by industry in Europe.

Brescia hosts the headquarters of several industry groups, including the Lucchini Group, the Feralpi and the Camozzi Group. Brescia is also home to the A2A Group (the result of the merger of ASM Brescia, AEM Milano and AMSA).

The financial sector is also a major employer, with the presence of several branches of banks and financial assets. The UBI Banca Group, fourth largest banking group in Italy, has several division headquarters in the city.

=== Tourism ===
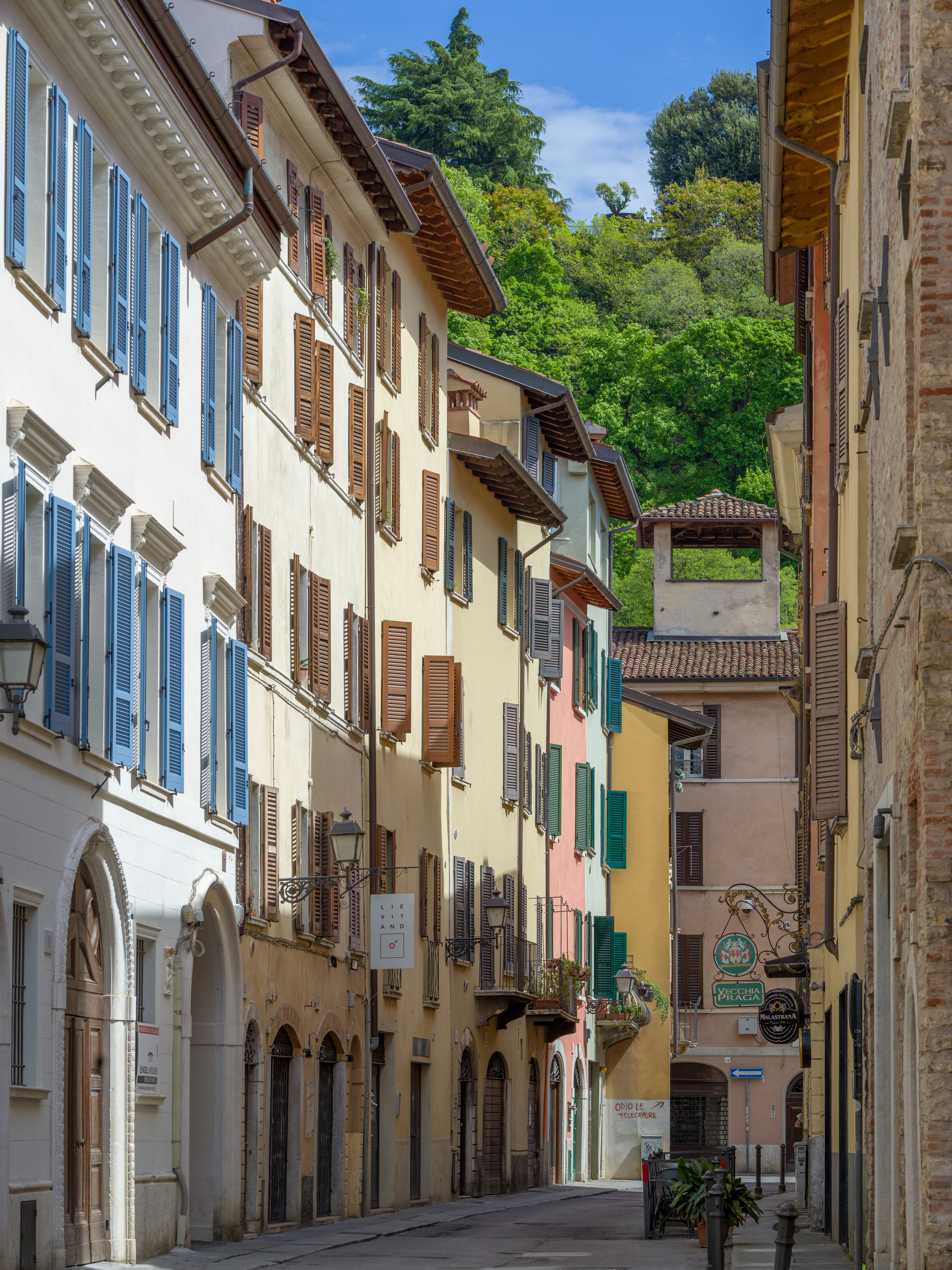
A street in the old town

The significant historical and artistic heritage of Brescia (since 2011 in the UNESCO World Heritage list) and the natural beauties of its surrounding area (like the Lake Garda, the Val Camonica and the Lake Iseo) have allowed the city to attract an increasing number of visitors. In 10 years, the number of tourists who visited Brescia has almost doubled from 142,556 in 2003 to over 280,000 in 2013.

Additionally, Brescia is close to important tourist destinations (Milan can be directly reached in 45 minutes by train, Venice and Florence in about 2 hours) and is one of the cheapest cities in Italy in terms of hotel stays. For these reasons, tourists often use Brescia as a base to explore the surrounding places.

== Transport ==
Brescia Mobilità (BM) is the statutory corporation responsible for the transport network in Brescia; it operates one metro line (Brescia Metro) and 19 urban bus lines. Besides public transport, BM manages the interchange parking lots and other transportation services including bike sharing and carsharing systems.

Since 2004 in the city center of Brescia is active a traffic restricted zone or ZTL (Italian: Zona a Traffico Limitato). The objective of the ZTL, together with a program of pedestrianizations of the main squares and streets of the historical center, is to drastically reduce the chronic traffic jams that take place in the city of Brescia, promoting sustainable mobility and public transport, and decreasing the existing levels of smog that have become unsustainable from the point of view of public health.

=== Brescia Metro ===
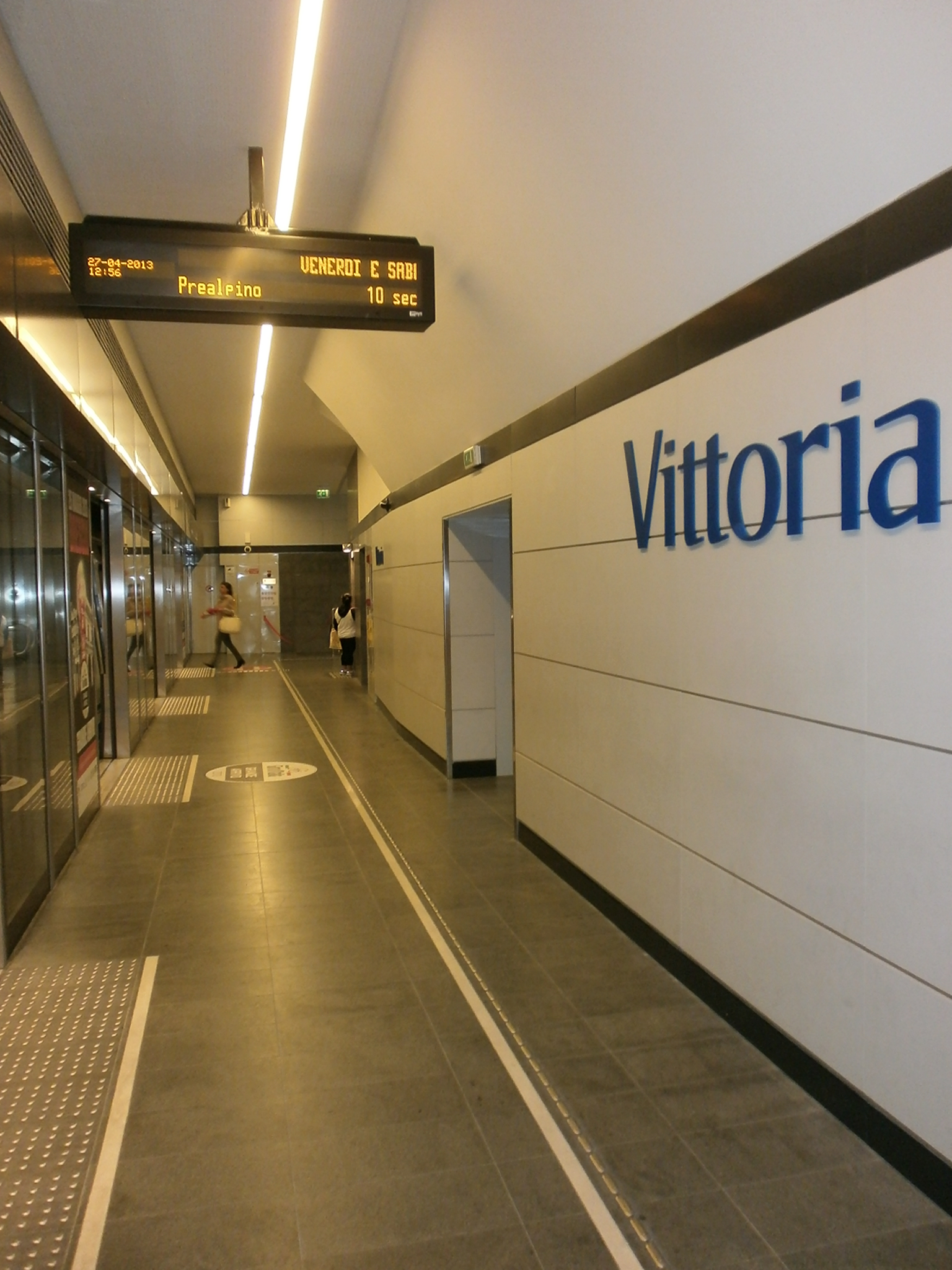
A station of Brescia Metro

The Brescia Metro is a rapid transit network that opened on 2 March 2013. The network comprises one line, 13.7 kilometres (9 mi) long, with 17 stations between Buffalora and Prealpino, of which 13 are underground.

The first projects for a metro in Brescia date back to the 1980s, with the introduction of the first fully automatic light metro systems in other mid-size cities in Europe. Two feasibility studies were commissioned in 1987. The automatic light metro system was chosen as the best technology for the city. The first public tender was announced in 1989. But this project was then cancelled in 1996.

In 1994, the first application for public financing was issued. The public financing form the central government arrived in 1995, while other funds arrived in 2002 from the Region. The international public bid for the first phase of the project was announced in 2000. The winning proposal was from a group of companies comprising Ansaldo STS, AnsaldoBreda, Astaldi and Acciona, with a system similar to that of the Copenhagen metro.

A €575 million contract was awarded to a consortium led by Ansaldo STS in April 2003. Work started in January 2004, but archaeological finds caused delays and required station redesigns.

=== Planned tram network ===
Brescia's former tram network (1882–1949)

Former tramway network operated from 1882 to 1949, but the city is due to reintroduce trams in the 2030s. The construction of the new light rail line, from the quarter of Pendolina to city fair center, was funded by Italian Ministry of Infrastructure and Transport for 422 milion euros. The city council approved the definitive project on 24 June 2024.

=== Rail ===
The train station of Brescia

Brescia has four railway stations. The main station, which opened in 1854, is located on the Milan-Venice railway and is the starting point for the Brescia-Iseo-Edolo, Brescia-Cremona, Brescia-Parma and Bergamo–Brescia rail lines. The station has 15 platforms and is used by about 20 million passengers per year. Other railway stations are Brescia Borgo San Giovanni and Brescia Violino (two lesser stations that are located on the Brescia-Iseo-Edolo railway) and Brescia Scalo, with no passenger service and used as a freight station.

From Brescia, high speed trains connect to Milan, Rome, Naples, Turin, Bologna, Florence and Venice; one can reach Milan in 35 min, Venice in 1h and 35 min, Florence in 2 hours and 15 min and Rome in 3 hours and 35 min. In addition there are international day trains to Zurich, and overnight sleeper services to Paris and Dijon (Thello), Munich and Vienna (ÖBB).

=== Roads ===
Brescia is connected with the rest of northern Italy by three motorways:

- A4, that is the main axis connecting the city with the east and the west of the country, to cities such as Milan, Turin, Venice and Trieste;
- A21, which connects Brescia to Turin with a more southern route than A4;
- A35, which connects Brescia to Milan and the Linate Airport with a faster route than A4.

=== Airports ===
Brescia is served by the following airports:

- Brescia Airport, located 15 km (9 mi) southeast of the city
- Bergamo Orio al Serio Airport, located 50 km (31 mi) northwest of Brescia
- Verona Villafranca Airport, located 60 km (37 mi) southeast of Brescia
- Milan Linate Airport, located 85 km (53 mi) west of Brescia
- Malpensa Airport, located 135 km (84 mi) northwest of Brescia

== Education ==
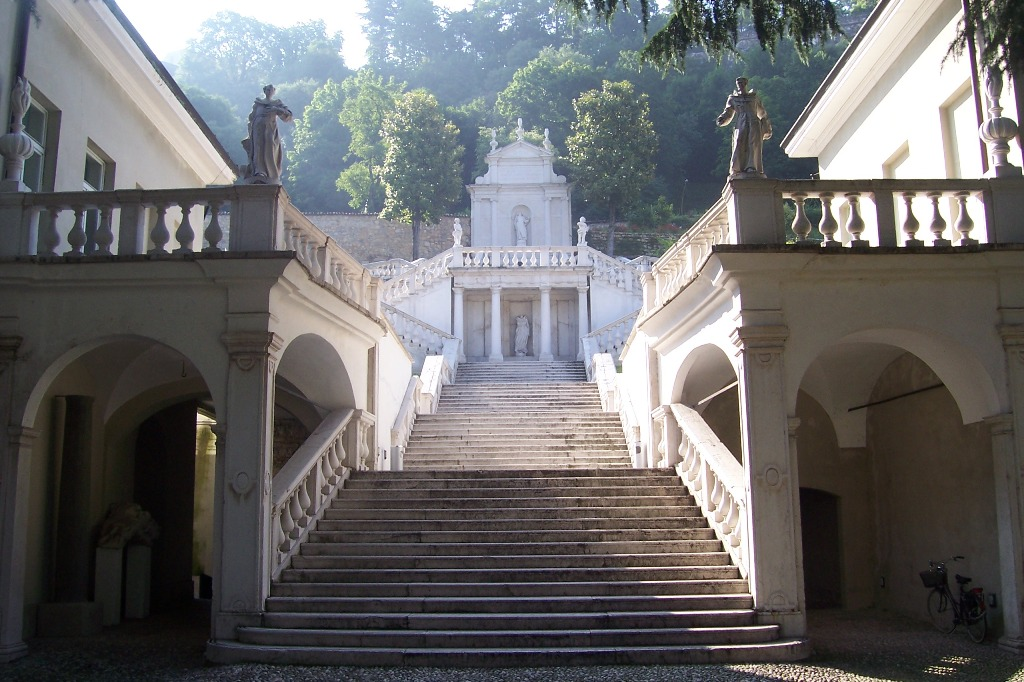
University of Brescia, Economics faculty

Classic lyceum "Arnaldo", established in 1797, is one of the oldest and most prominent high schools in Brescia.

As 2019, in Brescia there are 51 primary schools, of which 42 public and 9 private. There are also 29 lower secondary schools, of which 21 public and 8 private.

Referring to upper secondary schools, in Brescia there are 53 schools, of which 20 are private and 33 are public. Among them there are 3 classic lyceums and 13 scientific lyceums.

Brescia has two universities:

- University of Brescia is a public university founded in 1982 and ranked among the Top 700 universities worldwide. It is divided into 4 faculties: Economics, Engineering, Law, Medicine and Surgery.
- Catholic University of Brescia, founded in 1968, is a satellite campus of the Università Cattolica del Sacro Cuore. It is divided into 6 faculties: Literature and Philosophy; Psychology; Education; Language Sciences and Foreign Literature; Mathematics, Physics and Natural Sciences; Political and Social Sciences.

Brescia is also home of two academies of fine art (Libera Accademia di Belle Arti (LABA) and Accademia di Belle Arti SantaGiulia) and a conservatory of music (Conservatorio Luca Marenzio).

== Healthcare ==
Brescia is an important medical centre. The main hospital of the city is Spedali Civili di Brescia, which has 2,180 beds and an employed staff of 6,175. It was founded in 1427 and is considered the second best hospital in Italy. Other hospitals are located in the city: Fondazione Poliambulanza, Casa di Cura S. Camillo, Istituto Clinico S. Anna and Istituto Clinico Città di Brescia.

== Pollution ==
Brescia is at the top of the ranking of European cities with the highest preventable mortality burdens for PM2.5 pollution in a new study published in January 2021 by The Lancet Planetary Health, which estimates the death rate associated with fine particulate matter (PM2.5) and nitrogen dioxide (NO_{2}) pollution in 1000 European cities.

Legambiente based on the number of days the legal air-quality limits were breached in 2018. The report said Brescia failed to respect the legal limits for 150 days last year, 103 for ozone and 47 for Pm10 particles.

== Sport ==
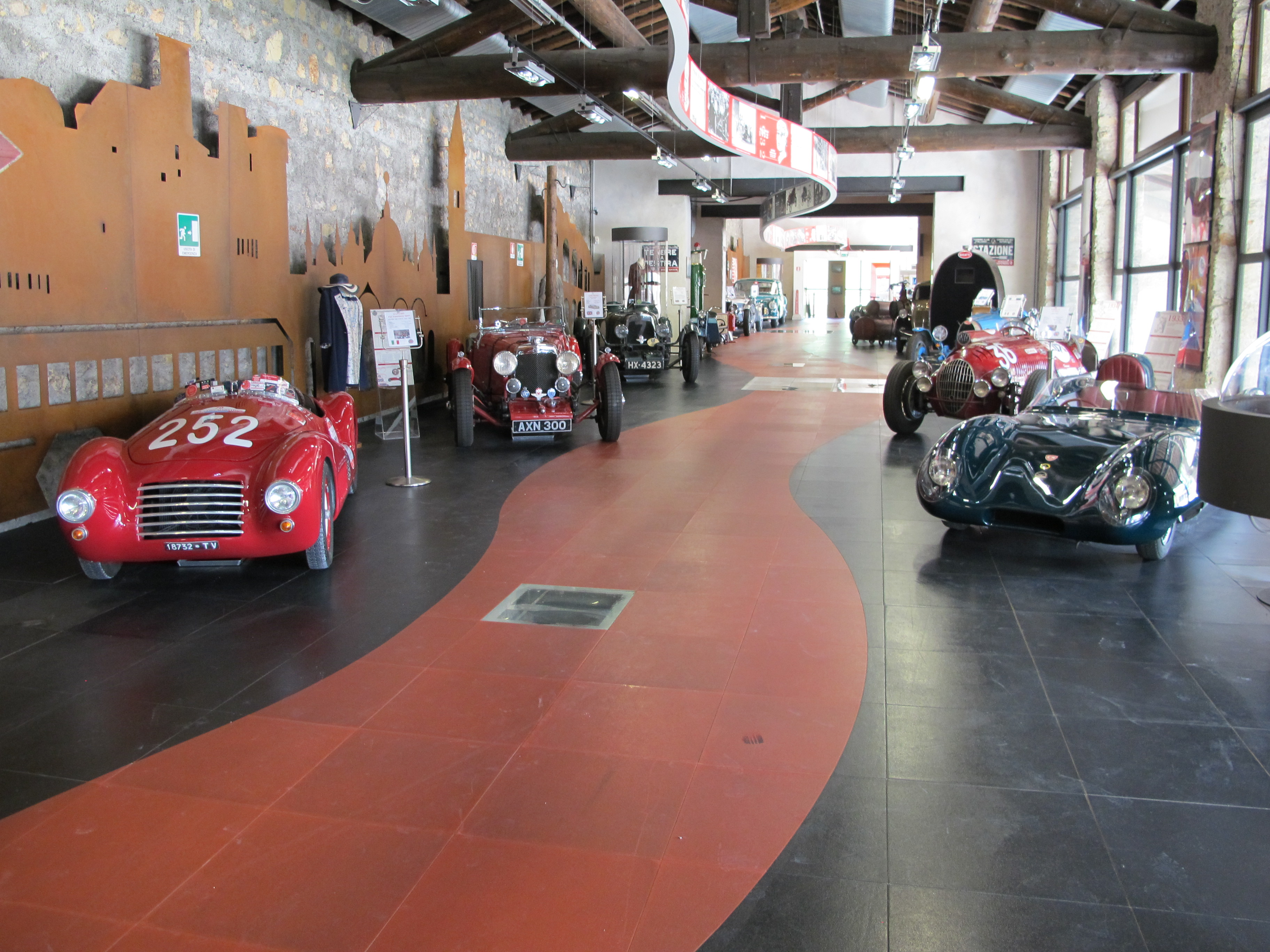
Mille Miglia Museum

Brescia was the starting and end point of the historical car race Mille Miglia that took place annually in May until 1957 on a Brescia-Rome-Brescia itinerary, and also the now defunct Coppa Florio, one of the first ever sport motor races. The Mille Miglia tradition is now kept alive by the "Historic Mille Miglia", a world-class event that gathers in Brescia every year thousands of fans of motor sports and of vintage sports cars. The only cars admitted to the race are the ones that could have competed in (although they do not necessarily have to have taken part in) the original Mille Miglia. The race nowadays is not however a speed race anymore, but rather a "regularity" race; speed races have actually been banned on regular roads in Italy because of the deadly accident that killed a driver and ten bystanders in the last minutes of the 1957 Mille Miglia – that therefore became the last of the original races.
In recent years, many celebrities have participated in the Mille Miglia, including Rowan Atkinson, Daniel Day-Lewis, Jeremy Irons, Jay Leno, Brian Johnson, Elliot Gleave, David Gandy, Jodie Kidd, Yasmin Le Bon and others.

Brescia is also the home of the Brescia Calcio football club and the Rugby Leonessa 1928.

Since 1984, the Schermabrescia fencing club is active. Brescia born foil-fencer Andrea Cassarà won the gold medal at the 2011 World Fencing Championships.

Brescia is the home of the Basket Brescia Leonessa basketball club. Leonessa has its home arena in the new PalaLeonessa, inaugurated in 2018, with a capacity of 5,200.

== International relations ==
In Brazil there is a town called Nova Bréscia. This name was given by its first citizens, who were from Brescia.

=== Twin towns – sister cities ===
Brescia is twinned with:

- Darmstadt, Germany (1991)
- Logroño, Spain (2006)
- Bethlehem, Palestine (2007)
- Troyes, France (2016)
- Kaunas, Lithuania (2022)

=== Consulates ===
Brescia is home to the following consulates:

- Albania
- Ghana
- Malta
- Moldova
- Romania

== Notable people ==
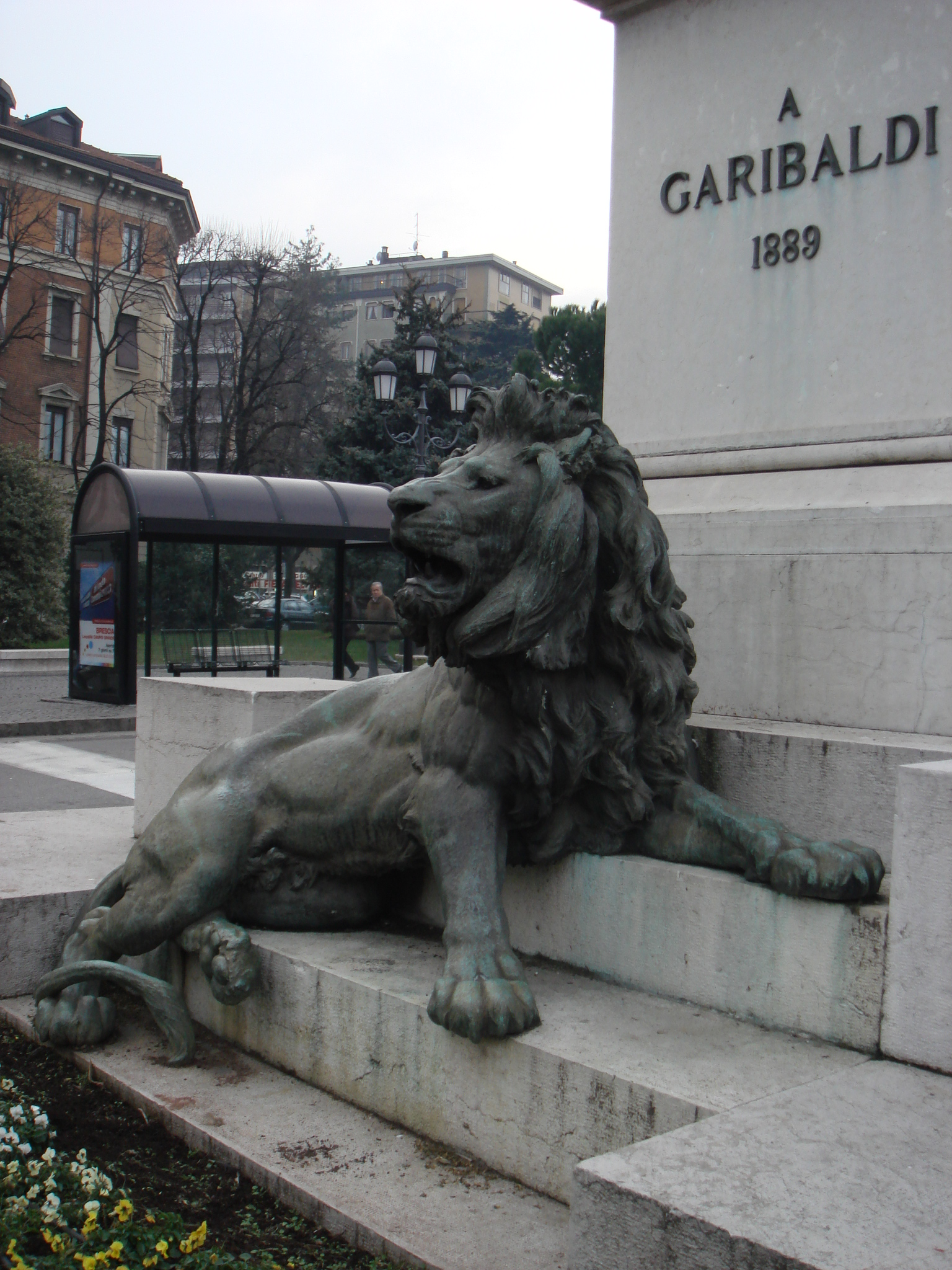
The monument representing a lion, the sign on the coat of arms of the city. The monument is also commonly considered a dedication to the "Lioness of Italy", nickname given to the city after the resistance the people of Brescia put in place during the Ten Days of Brescia in 1849 against the Austrians.

Monument to La Bella Italia, erected in 1864 in the memory of the Ten Days of Brescia

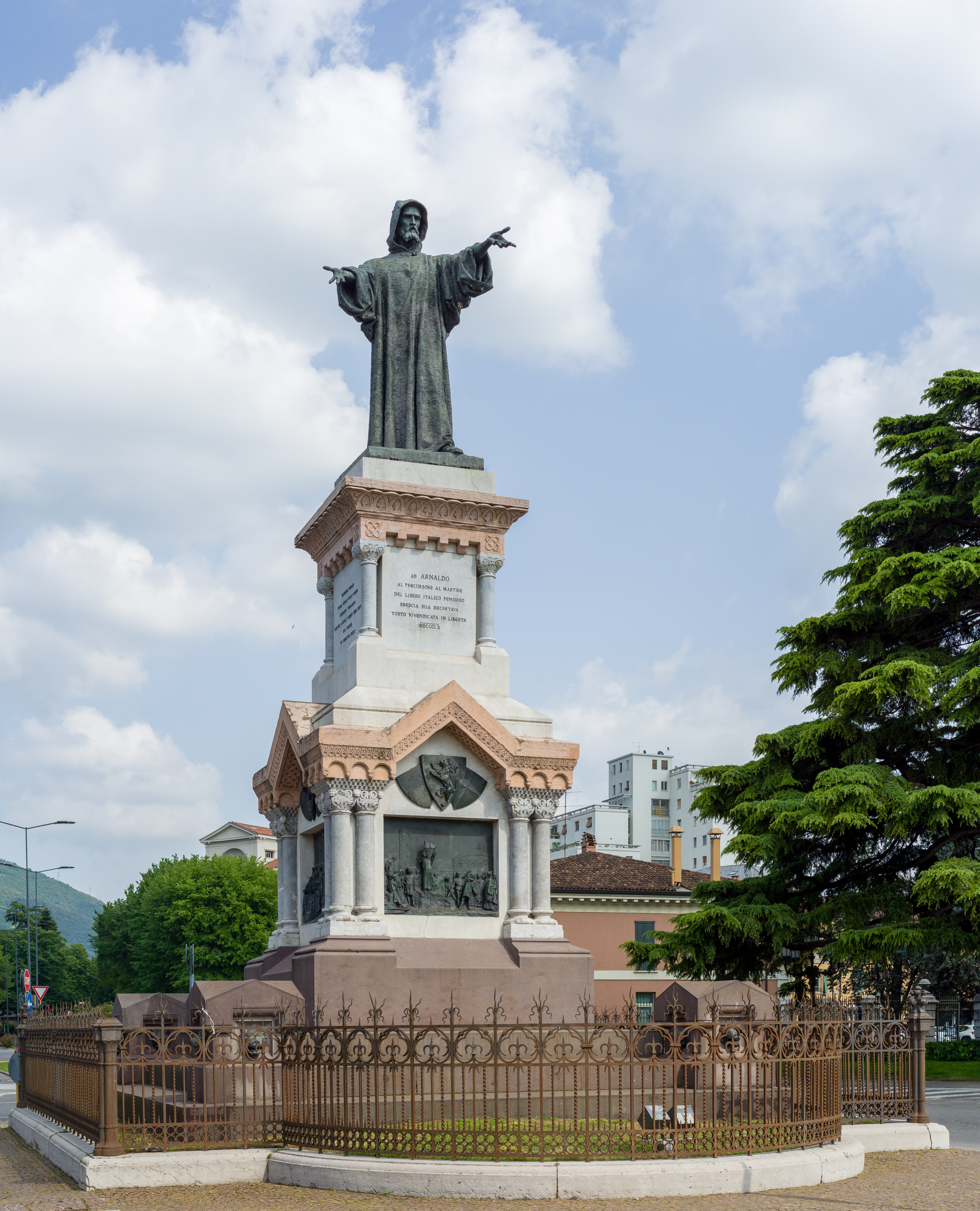
Monument to Arnaldo in the homonymous square, erected in 1882

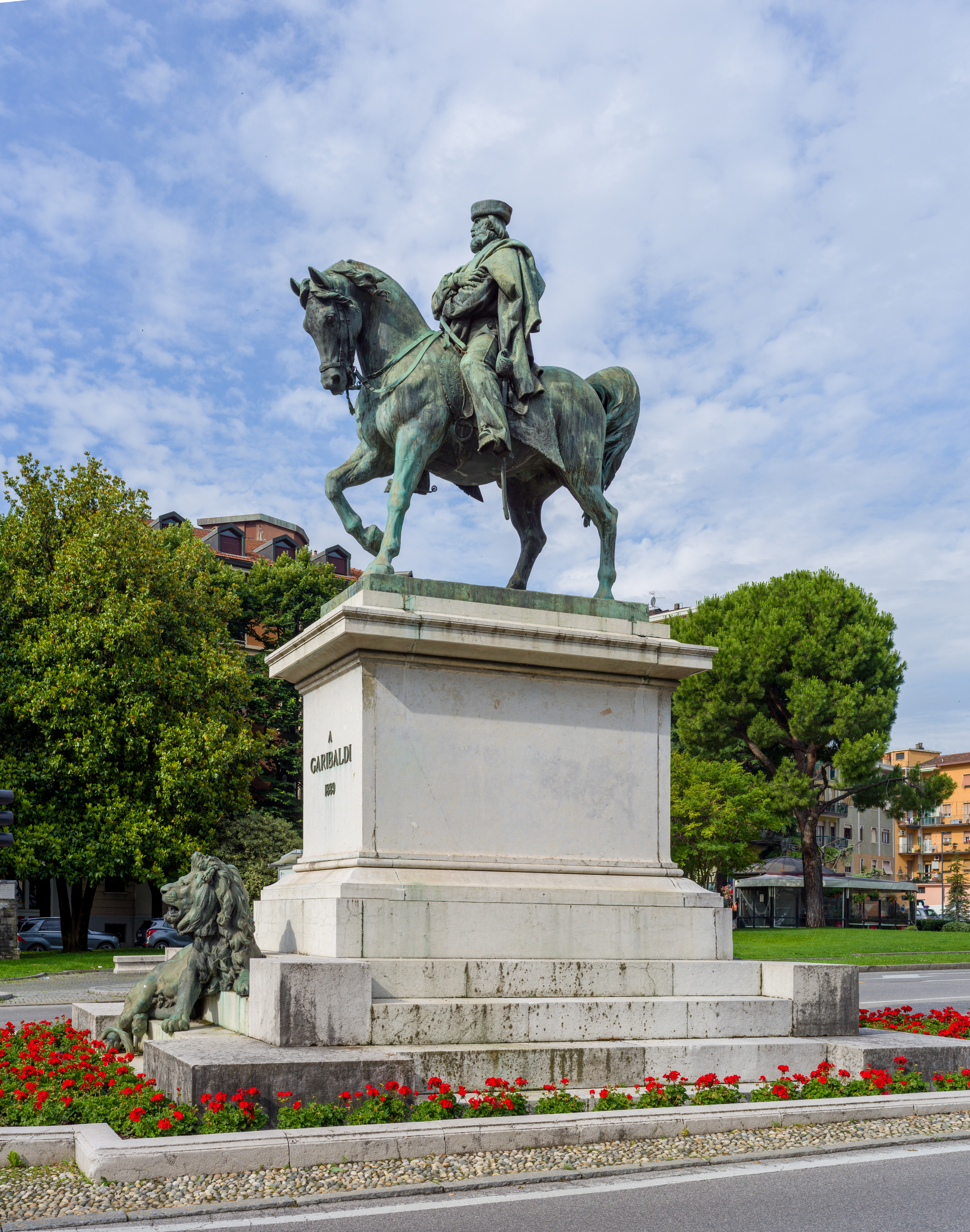
Monument to Giuseppe Garibaldi, erected in 1889

- Marcus Nonius Macrinus (fl.152–71), Roman general and consul to Emperor Marcus Aurelius
- Rothari or Rotari (c. 602–652), king of the Lombards
- Rodoald or Rodoaldo (c. 637–653), king of the Lombards
- Desiderius (before 756–c. 786), king of the Lombards
- Louis II, Holy Roman Emperor (825–875), Frankish emperor and King of Italy
- Arnold of Brescia (1090–1155), dissident monk
- Albertanus of Brescia (1195–1251), Latin author
- Vincenzo Capirola (1474–after 1548), composer
- Vincenzo Foppa (c. 1427–c. 1515), painter
- Laura Cereta (1469–1499), humanist author
- Saint Angela Merici (1474–1540), founded the Order of Ursulines in Brescia in 1535
- Girolamo Savoldo (c. 1480/5–after 1548), painter
- Veronica Gambara (1485–1550), poet and stateswoman
- Girolamo Romani, also known as "Romanino" (c. 1485–c. 1566), painter
- Bartolomeo Beretta (1490–1565), gunsmith and founder of the Beretta firearm company
- Alessandro Bonvicino/Buonvicino, commonly known as "Moretto/Il Morretto da Brescia" (c. 1498–1554), painter
- Niccolò Fontana Tartaglia (1499–1557), mathematician
- Giovanni Paoli (c. 1500–1560/1), brought the printing press to the New World in Mexico City
- Gasparo da Salò, (1540–1609), pioneer of violin making
- Giuliano Paratico (c. 1550–c. 1616), musician & composer
- Giulio Sirenio (1553-1593), philosopher
- Luca Marenzio/Marentio (1553/4–1599), composer
- Benedetto Castelli (1578–1643), mathematician and expert in hydraulics
- Giulio Alenio (1582–1649), Jesuit missionary called the "Confucius from the West"
- Giovanni Battista Fontana (1589–1630), composer
- Biagio Marini (1594–1663), composer
- Dionisio Boldo (fl.1604), painter
- Francesco Lana de Terzi (1631–1687), aeronautics and braille pioneer
- Carlo Bacchiocco, 17th-century painter with work in Brescia
- Paris Francesco Alghisi (1666–1733), composer
- Giovanni Bassignani (1669–1717), architect and engineer
- Pietro Gnocchi (1689–1775), eccentric polymath and composer
- Gaetano Crivelli (1768–1836), opera singer
- Francesca Lechi (1773–1806), revolutionary and figure in Milanese society
- Giacomo Rossetti (1807–1882), painter and photographer
- Saint Maria Crocifissa di Rosa (1813–1855), who founded the Handmaids of Charity order of nuns in Brescia in 1840
- Enrico Crivelli (1820–1870), opera singer and son of Gaetano Crivelli
- Giuseppe Zanardelli (1826–1903), jurist, politician, prime minister of the Kingdom of Italy (1901–1903)
- Saint Giovanni Battista Piamarta (1841–1913), priest and educator, founder of the Congregation of the Holy Family of Nazareth
- Camillo Golgi, (1843–1926), experimental pathologist, received Nobel Prize in Physiology or Medicine in 1906 for his studies of the structure of the nervous system
- Pope Paul VI (1897–1978), born nearby in Concesio as Giovanni Battista Montini
- Aymo Maggi (1903–1961), racing driver
- Franco Comotti (1906–1963), racing driver
- Guglielmo Achille Cavellini (1914–1990), art collector and artist
- Arturo Benedetti Michelangeli (1920–1995), pianist of the 20th century
- Lento Goffi (1923-2008), poet, literary critic and journalist, died in Brescia
- Remo Bertoni (1929–1993), football player
- Emanuele Severino (1929–2020), philosopher and composer
- Giacomo Agostini (born 1942), Grand Prix motorcycle racer and World Champion 1964–1977
- Carlo Giannini (1948–2004), econometrician and mathematical economist
- Maurizio Venturi (born 1957), football player and manager
- Sergio Scariolo (born 1961), basketball coach
- Claudio Langes (born 1961), racing driver
- Vittorio Colao (born 1961), businessman
- Alessandro Zampedri (born 1969), racing driver
- Riccardo Frizza (born 1971), conductor
- Christian Pescatori (born 1971), racing driver
- Manuel Belleri (born 1977), football player
- Marco Cassetti (born 1977), football player
- Andrea Pirlo (born 1979), football player
- Daniele Bonera (born 1981), football player
- L'Aura (born 1984), singer-songwriter
- Andrea Cassarà (born 1984), world champion fencer
- Nino Bertasio (born 1988), professional golfer
- Federico Colli (born 1988), classical pianist
- Francesco Servidei (born 1989), rapper and singer-songwriter
- Vanessa Ferrari (born 1990), gymnast
- VINAI (born 1990/1994), DJs and EDM producers
- Alberto Cerqui (born 1992), racing driver
- Marcell Jacobs (born 1994), athlete
- Davide Calabria (born 1996), football player
- Vittoria Ceretti (born 1998), model
- Lorenzo Lodici (born 2000), chess grandmaster
- Tommaso Mosca (born 2000), racing driver
- Riccardo "Blanco" Fabbriconi (born 2003), singer and rapper, Italian representative at the Eurovision Song Contest 2022

== Gallery ==
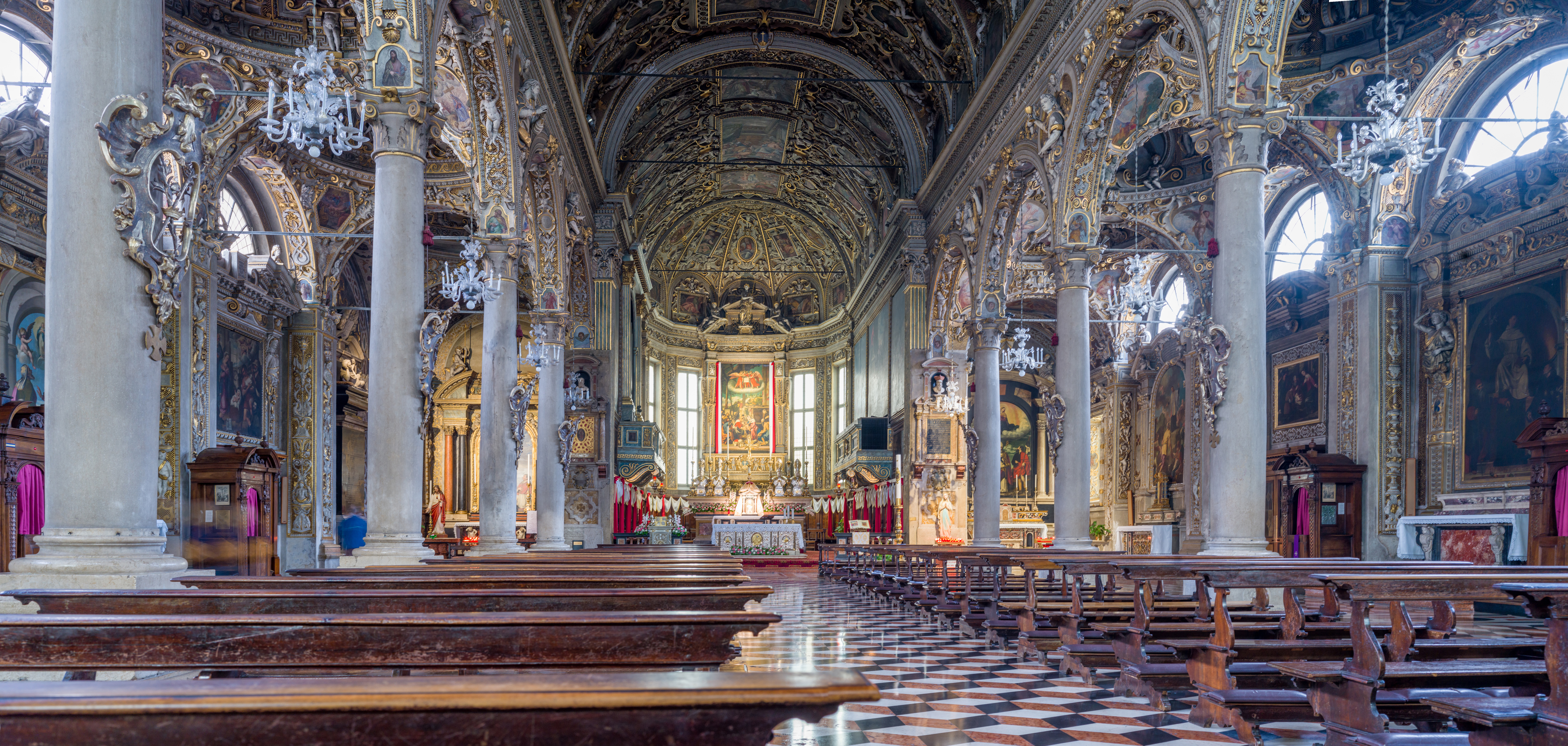
Interior view of the Santa Maria delle Grazie church

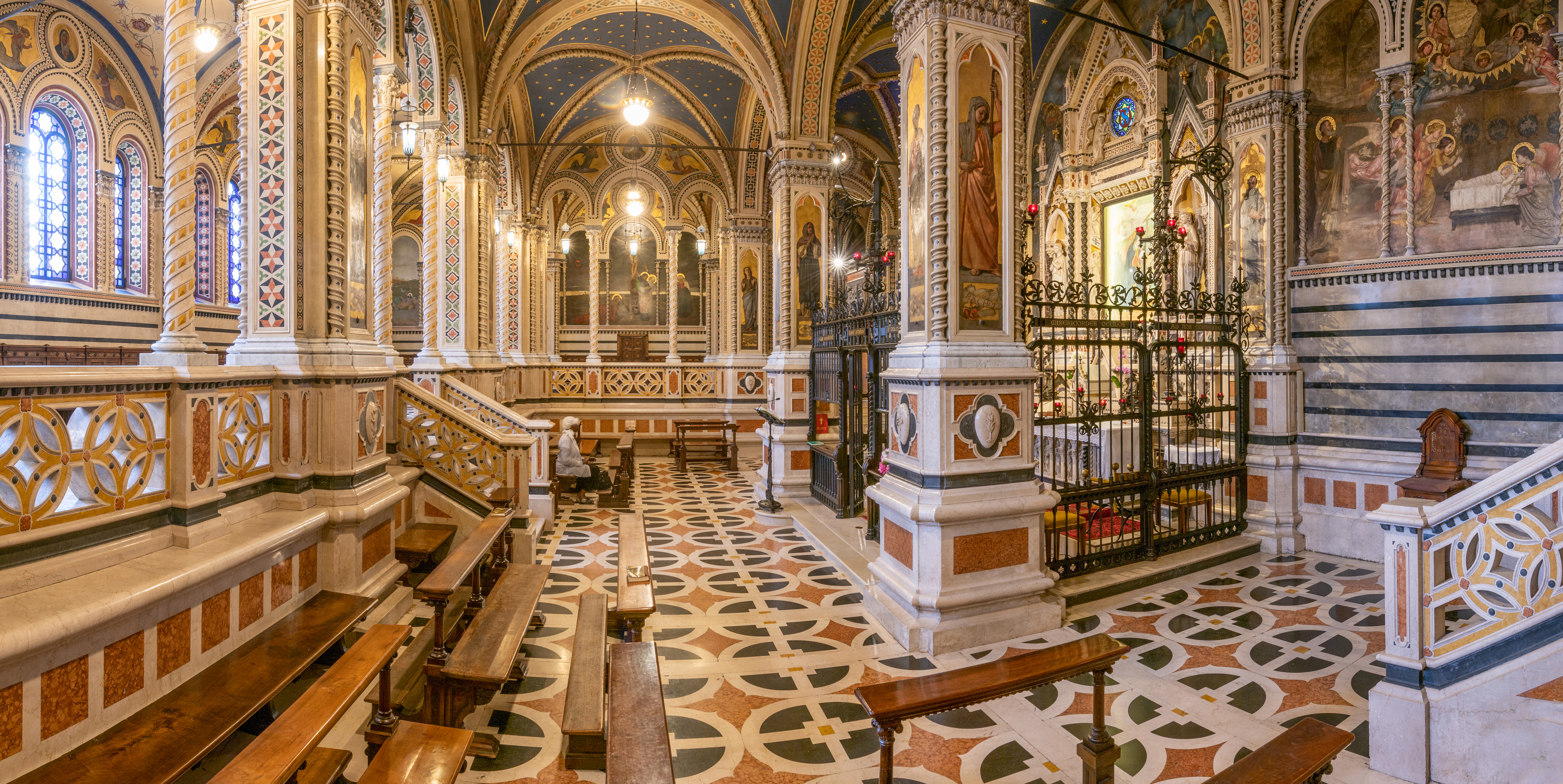
Internal view of the Santuario di Santa Maria delle Grazie church

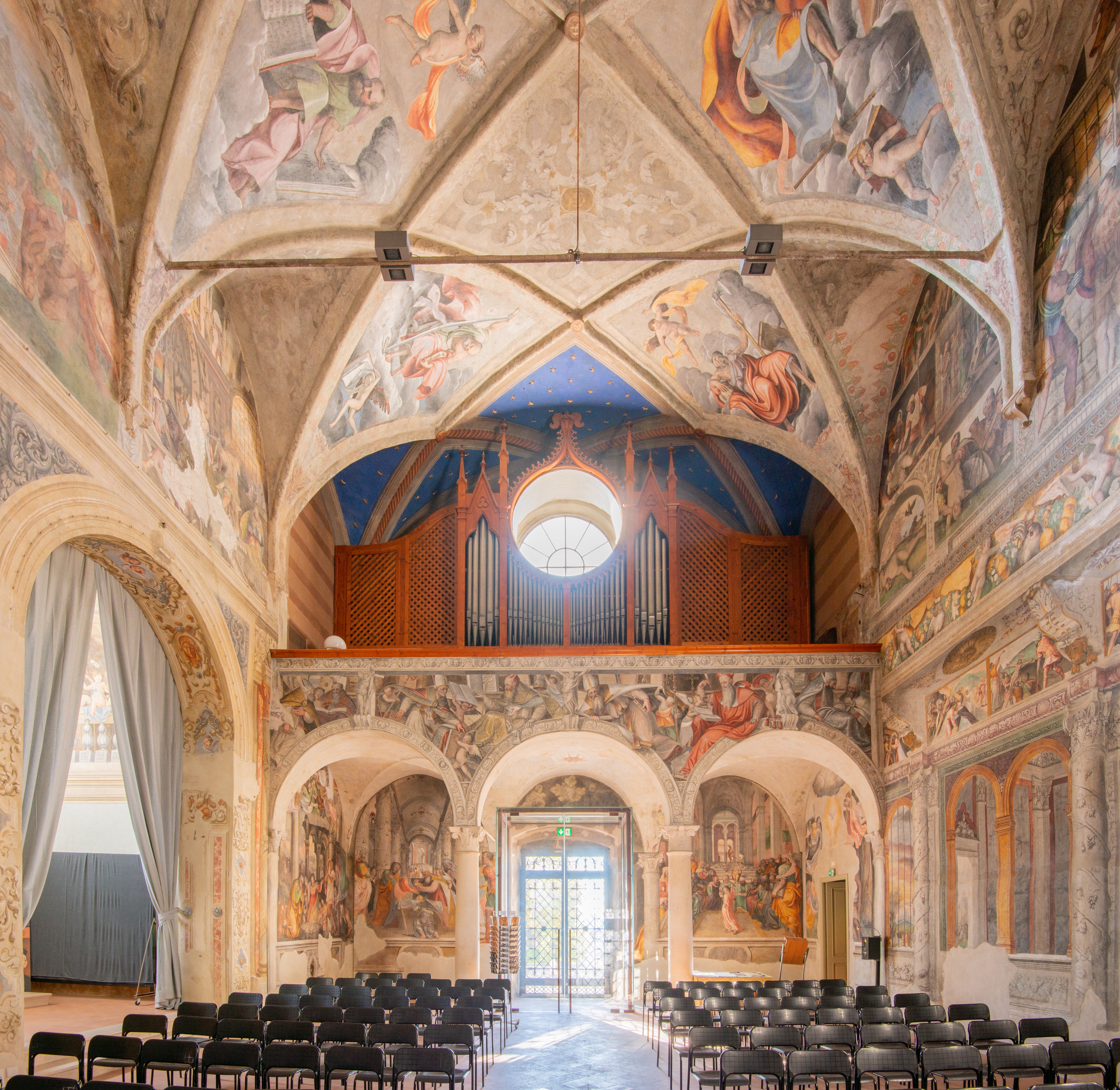
Internal view of the Santissimo Corpo di Cristo church

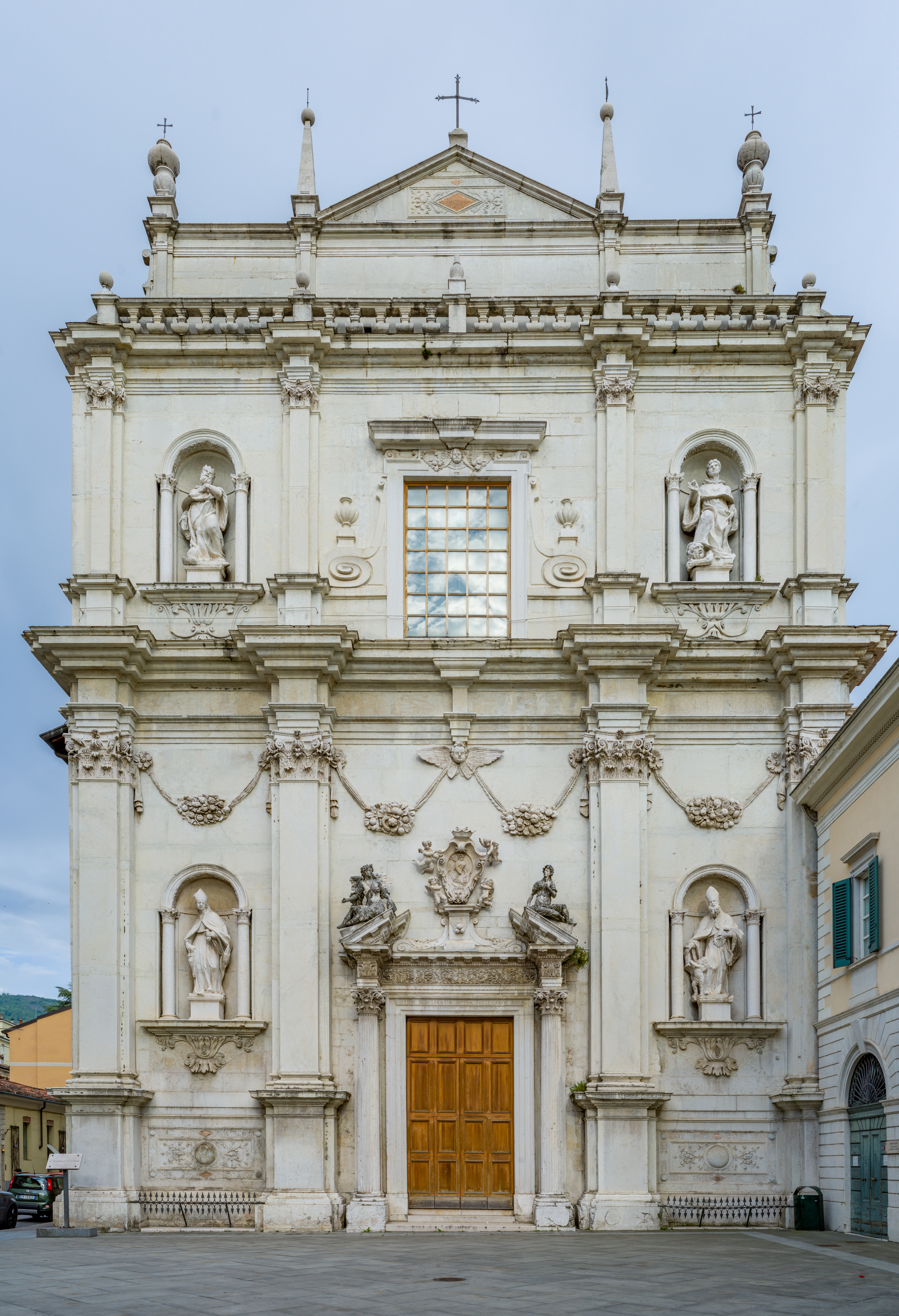
Former San Barnaba church

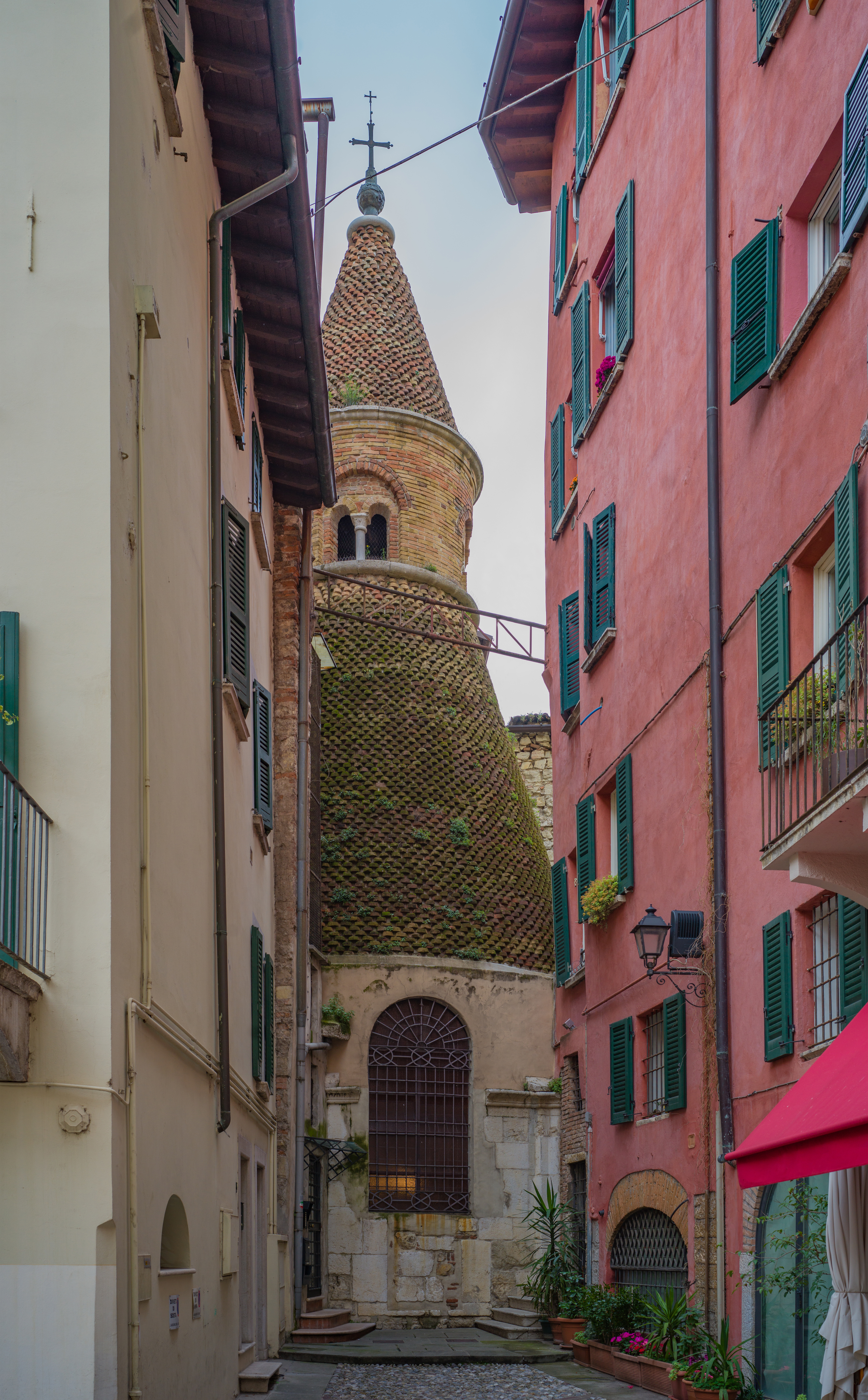
San Faustino in Riposo church

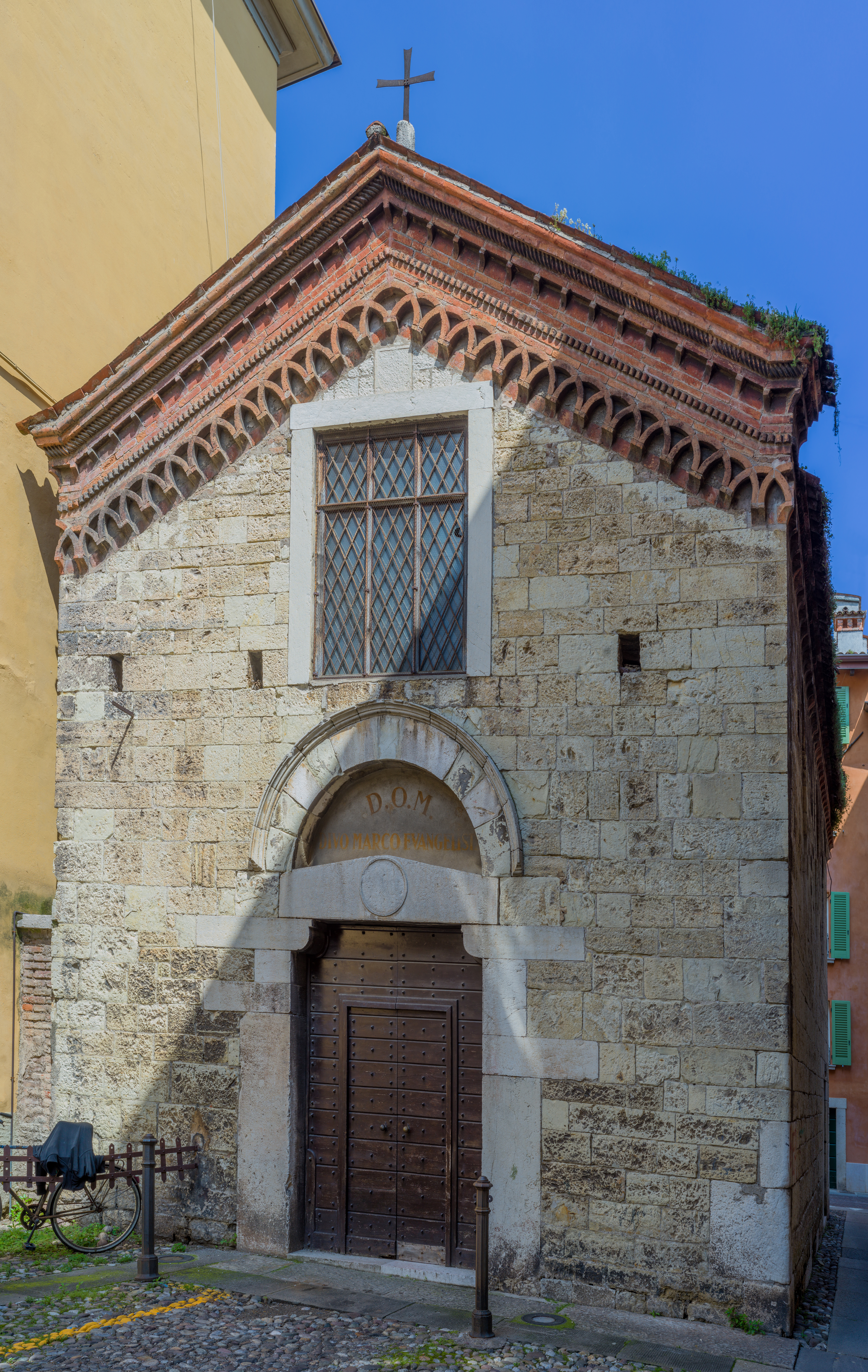
San Marco Evangelista church

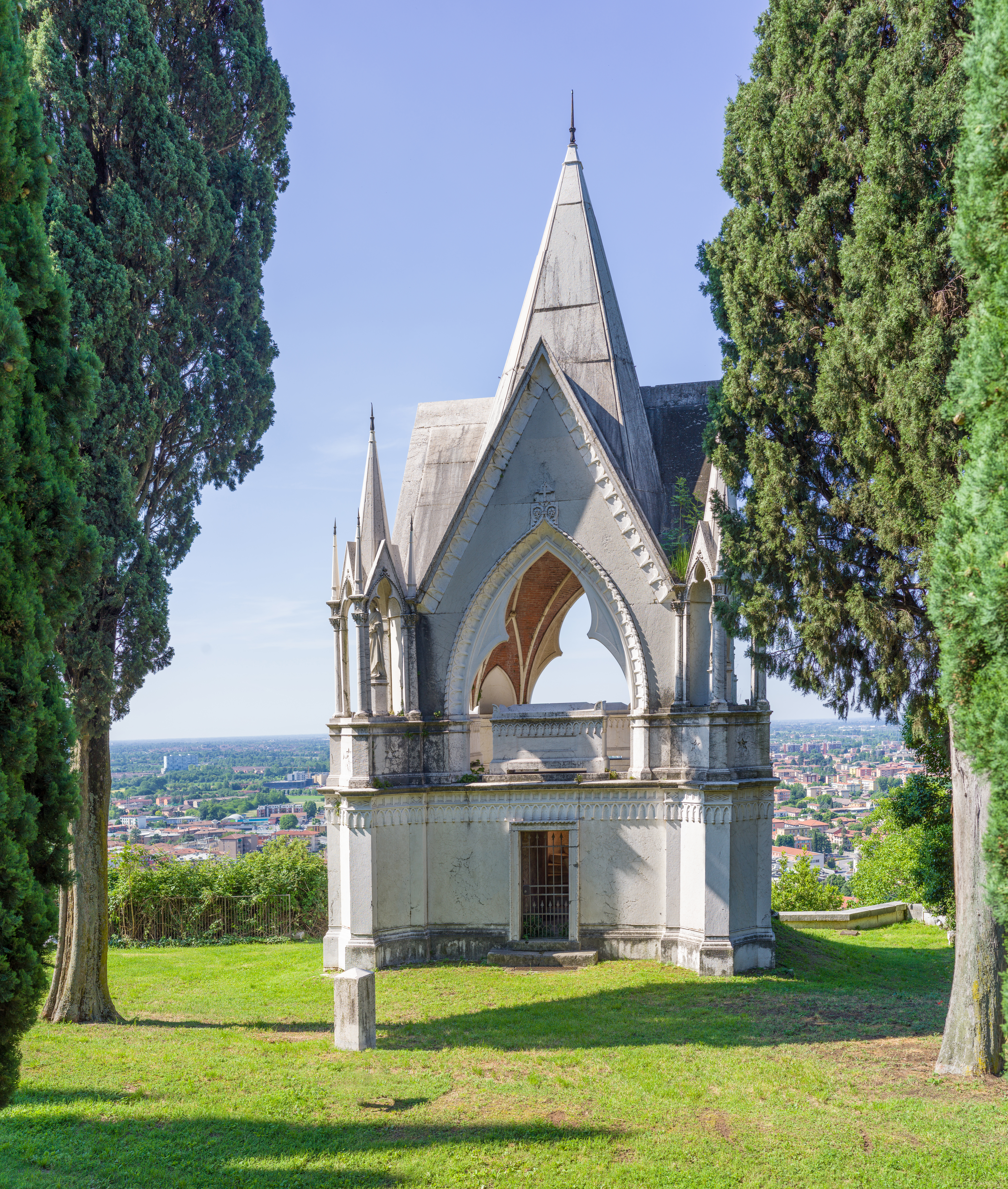
Bonomini Tomb also known as the Dog's Tomb

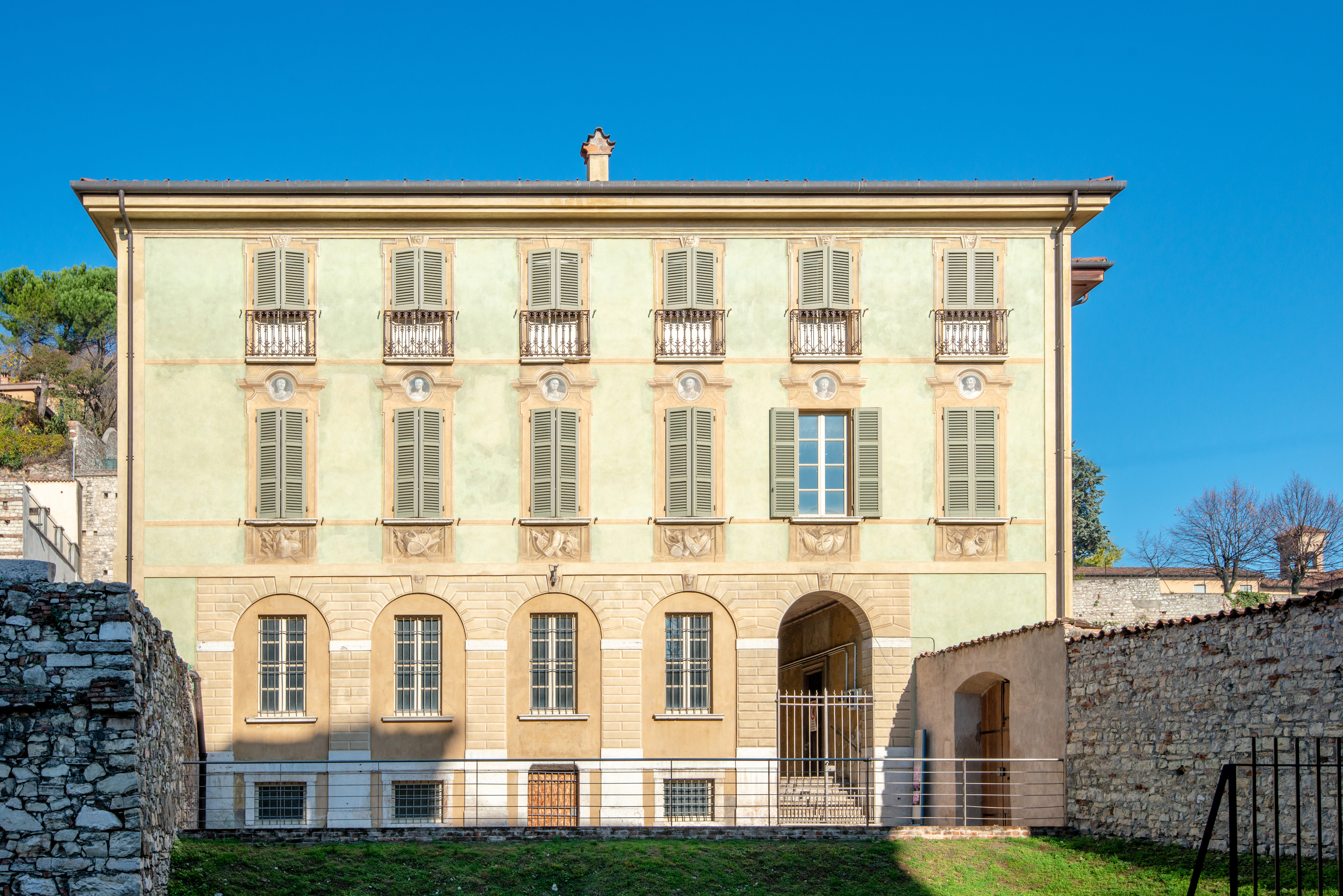
Maggi-Gambara Palace

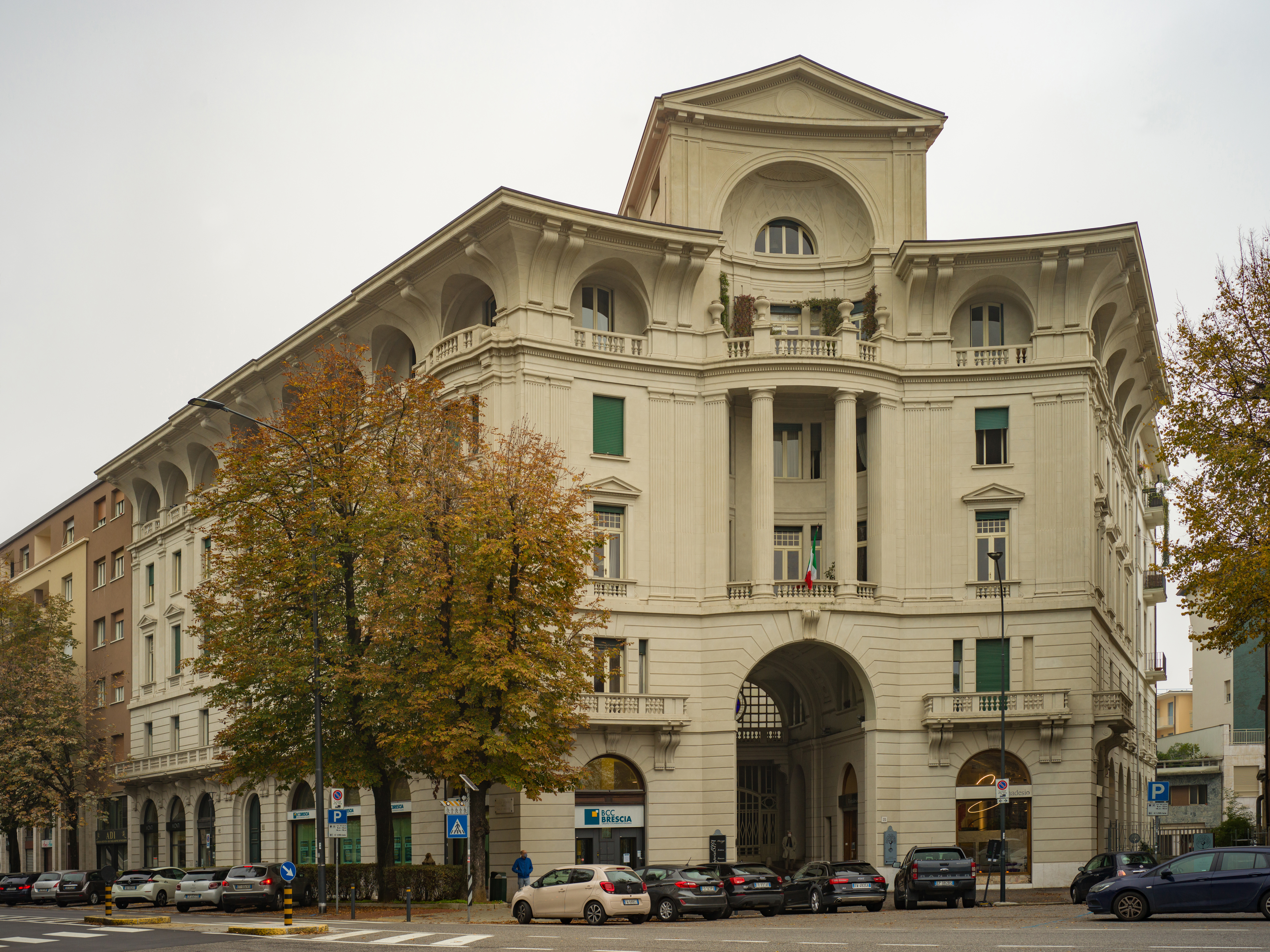
Bertolotti Palace

Beretta Palace

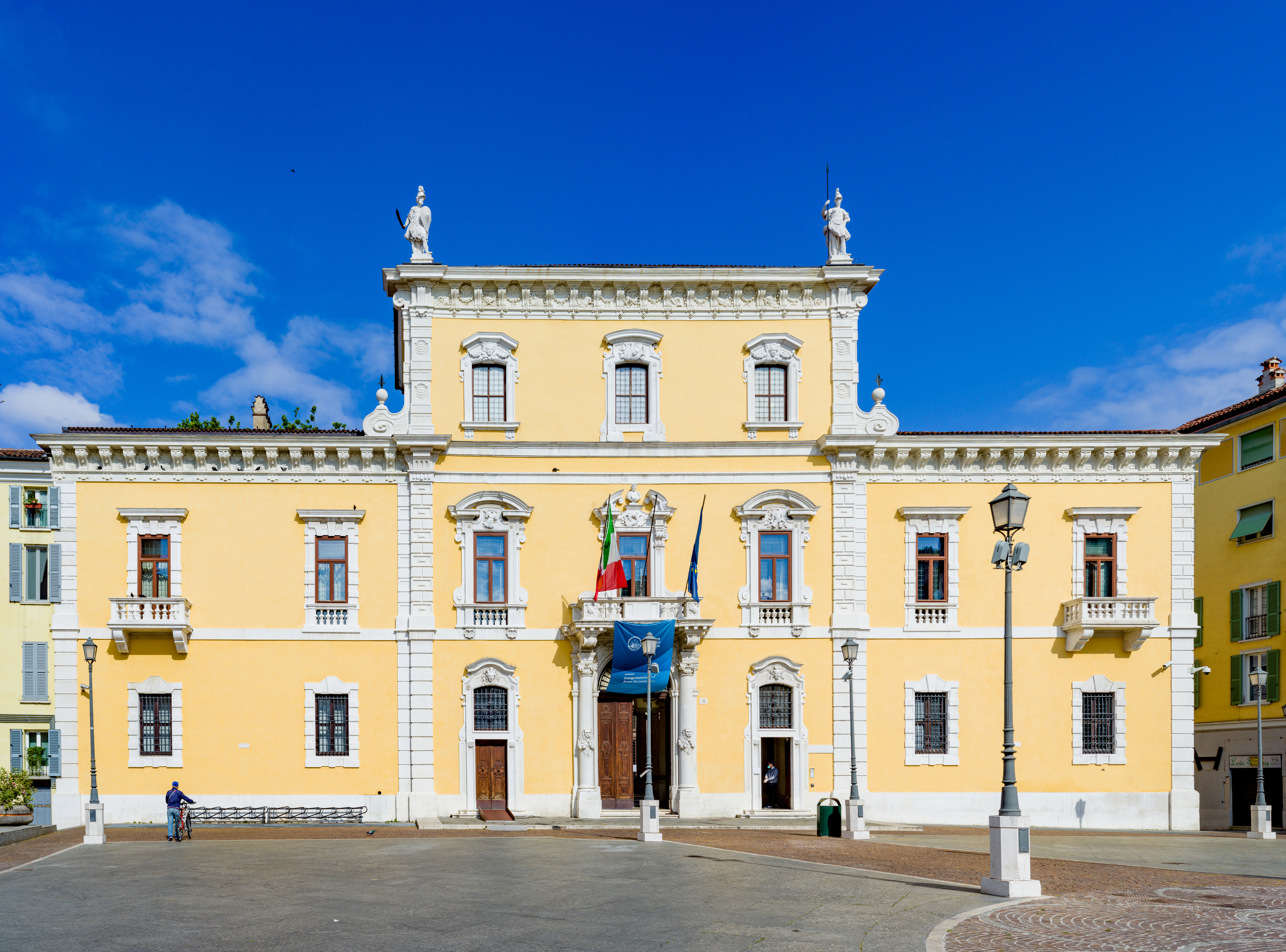
Martinengo Palace

Piazza Duomo by night

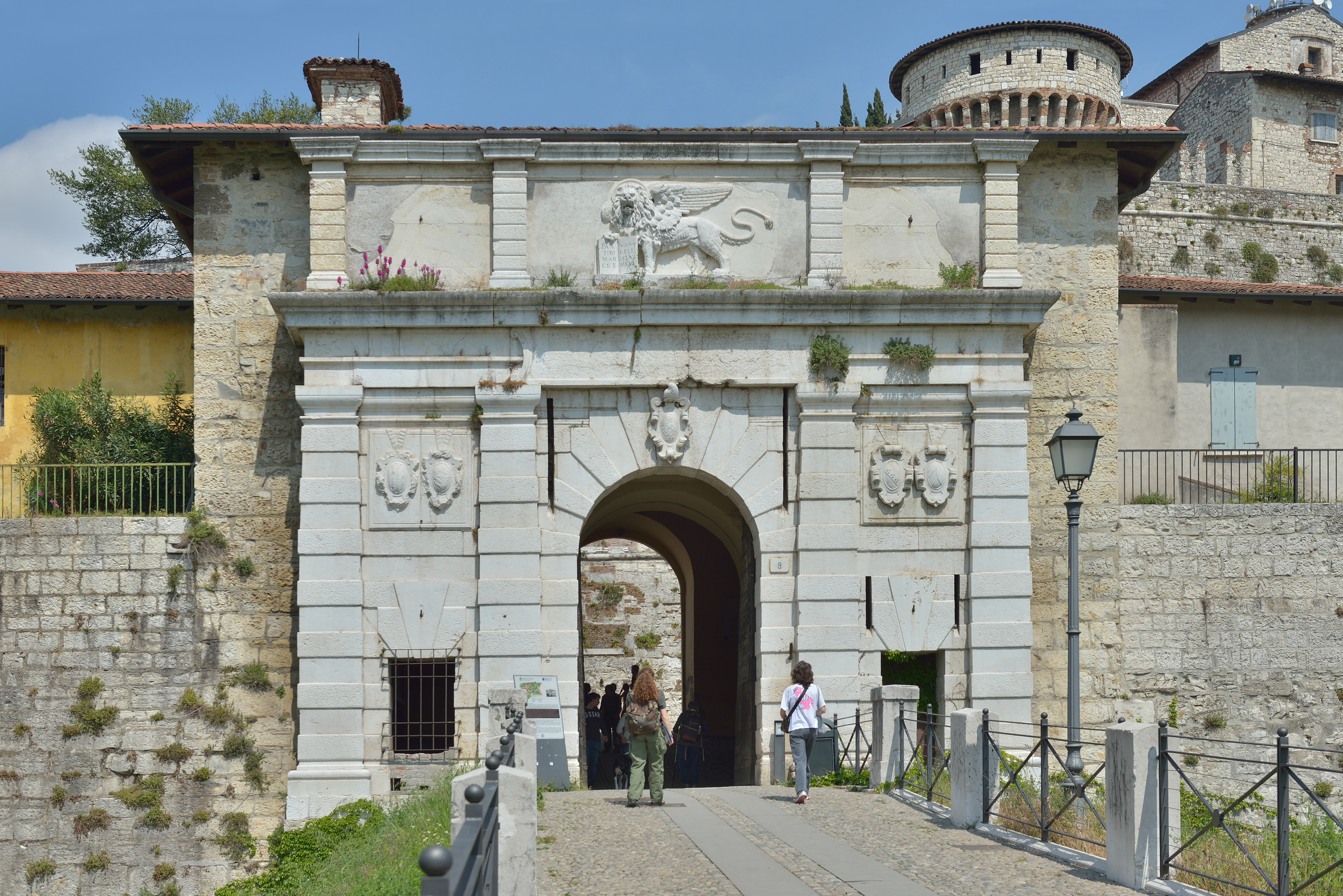
The Castle's main entrance

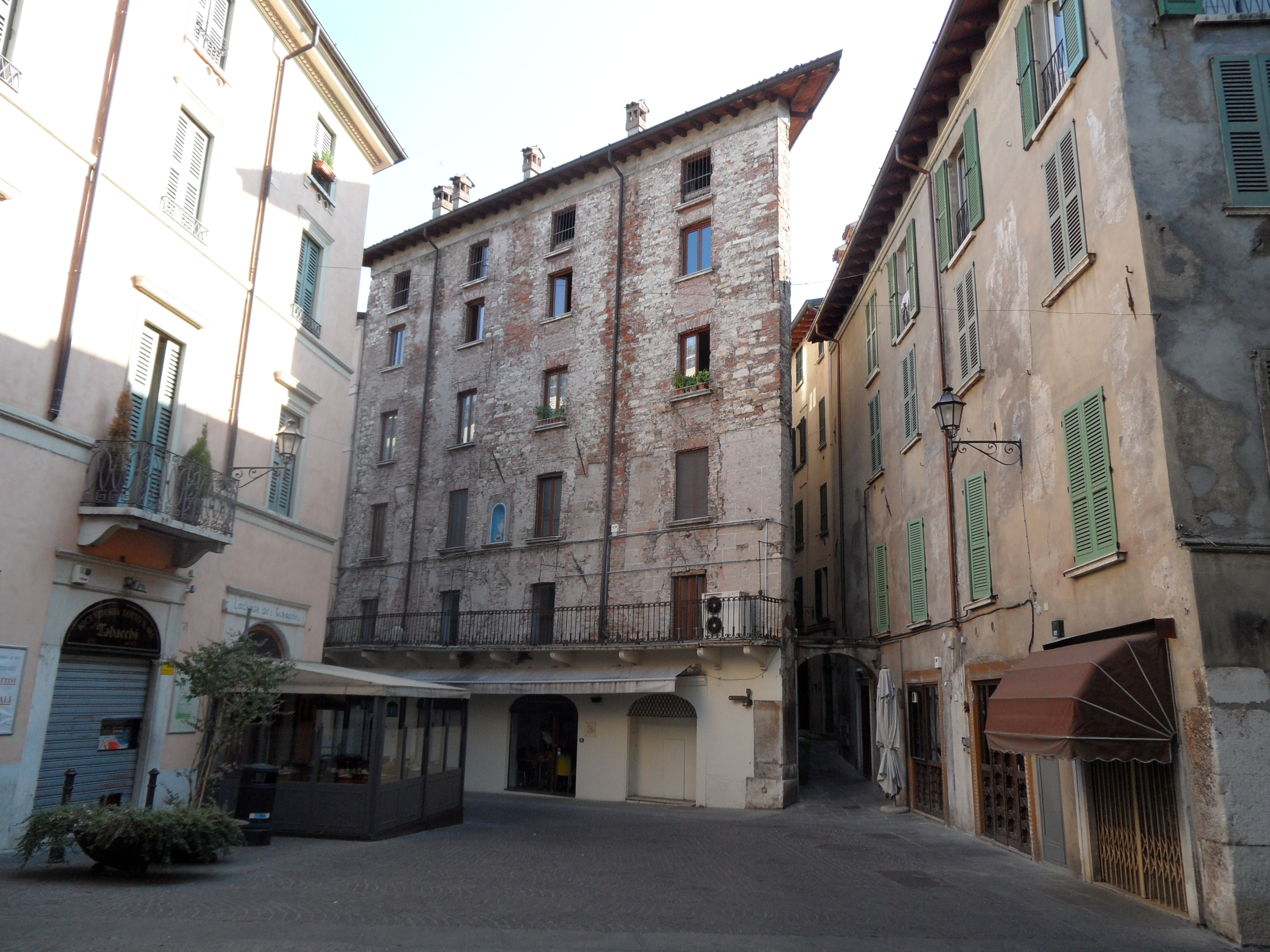
Street in the old city center

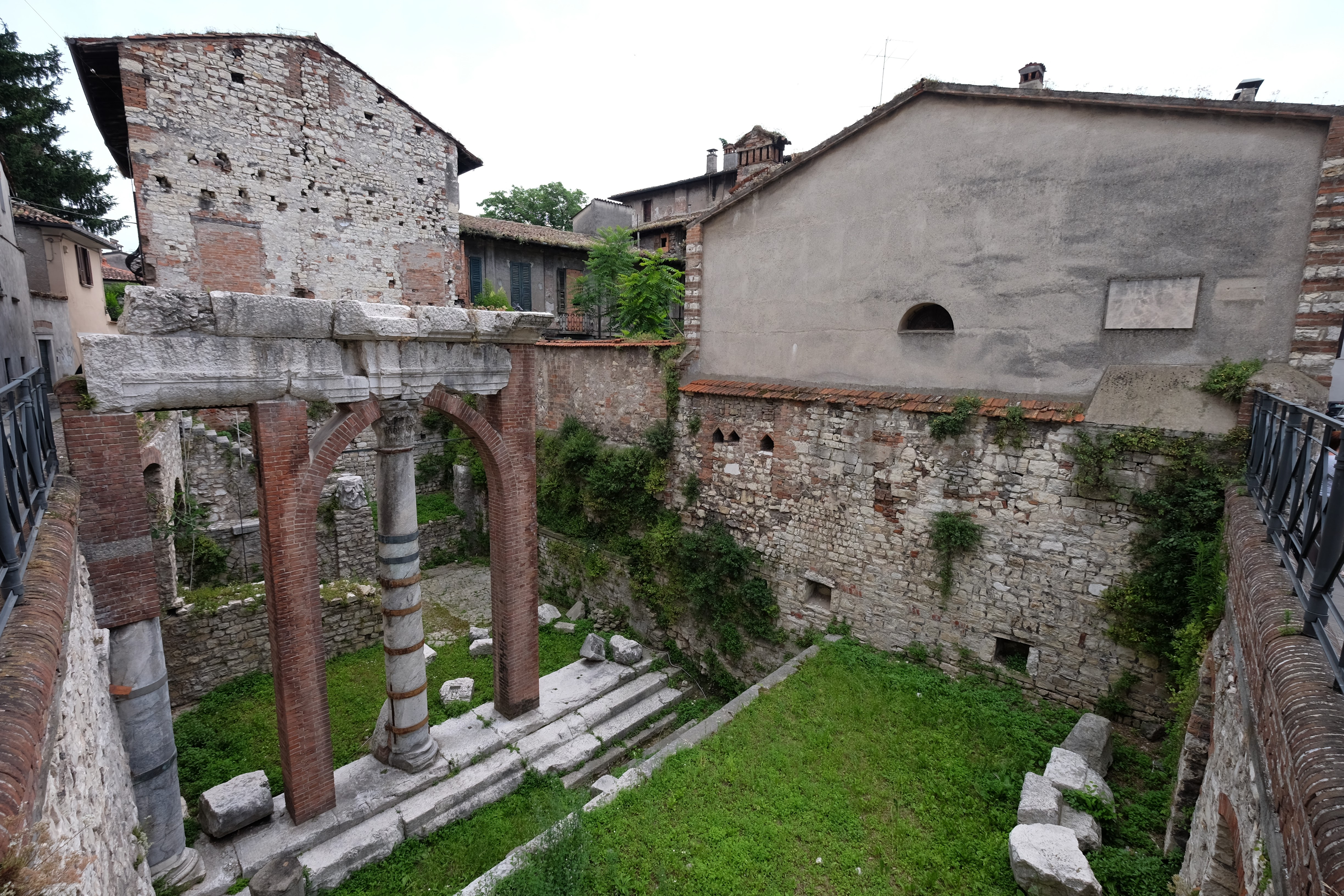
Roman ruins

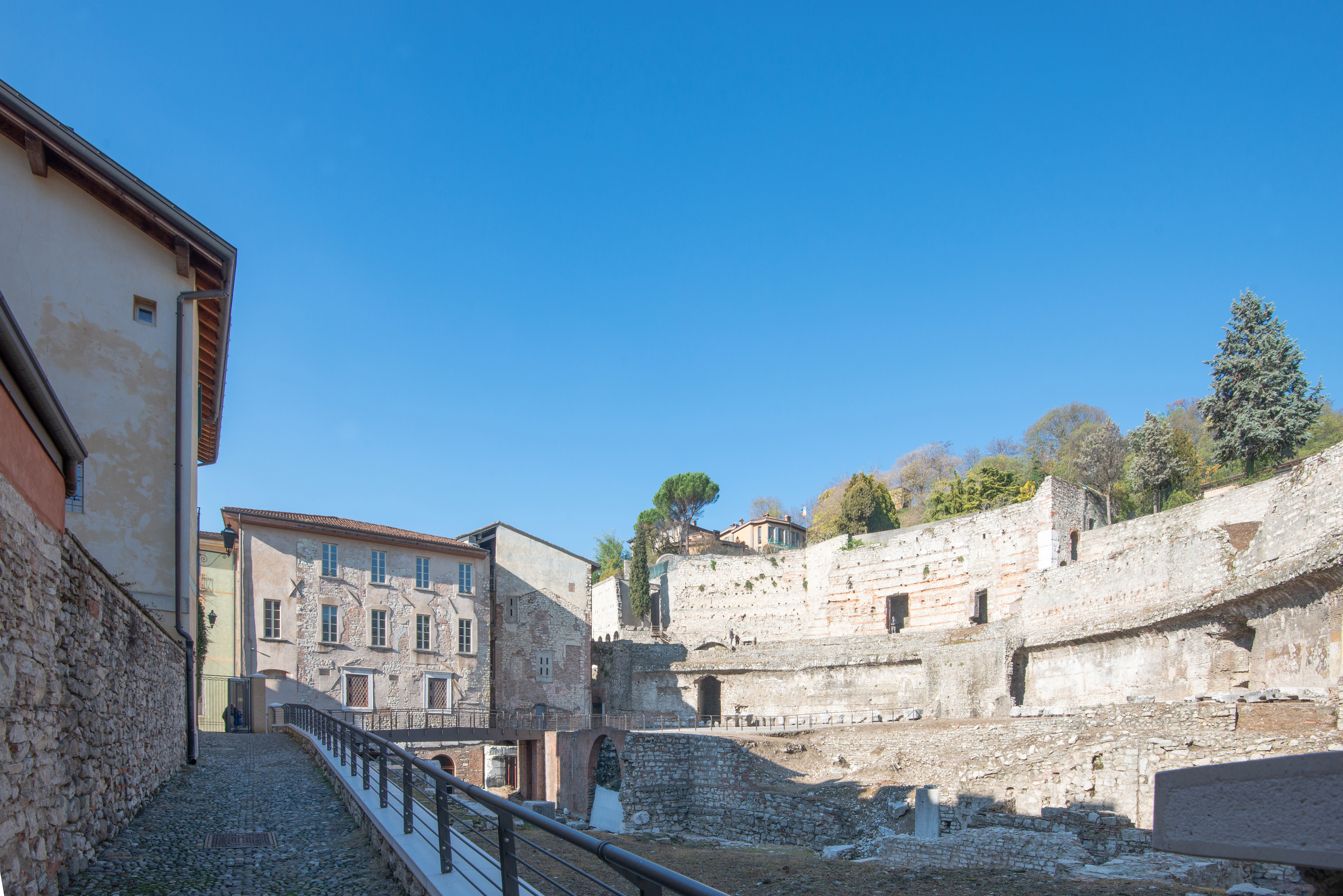
Roman Theatre section

Corso Zanardelli and Teatro Grande main entrance

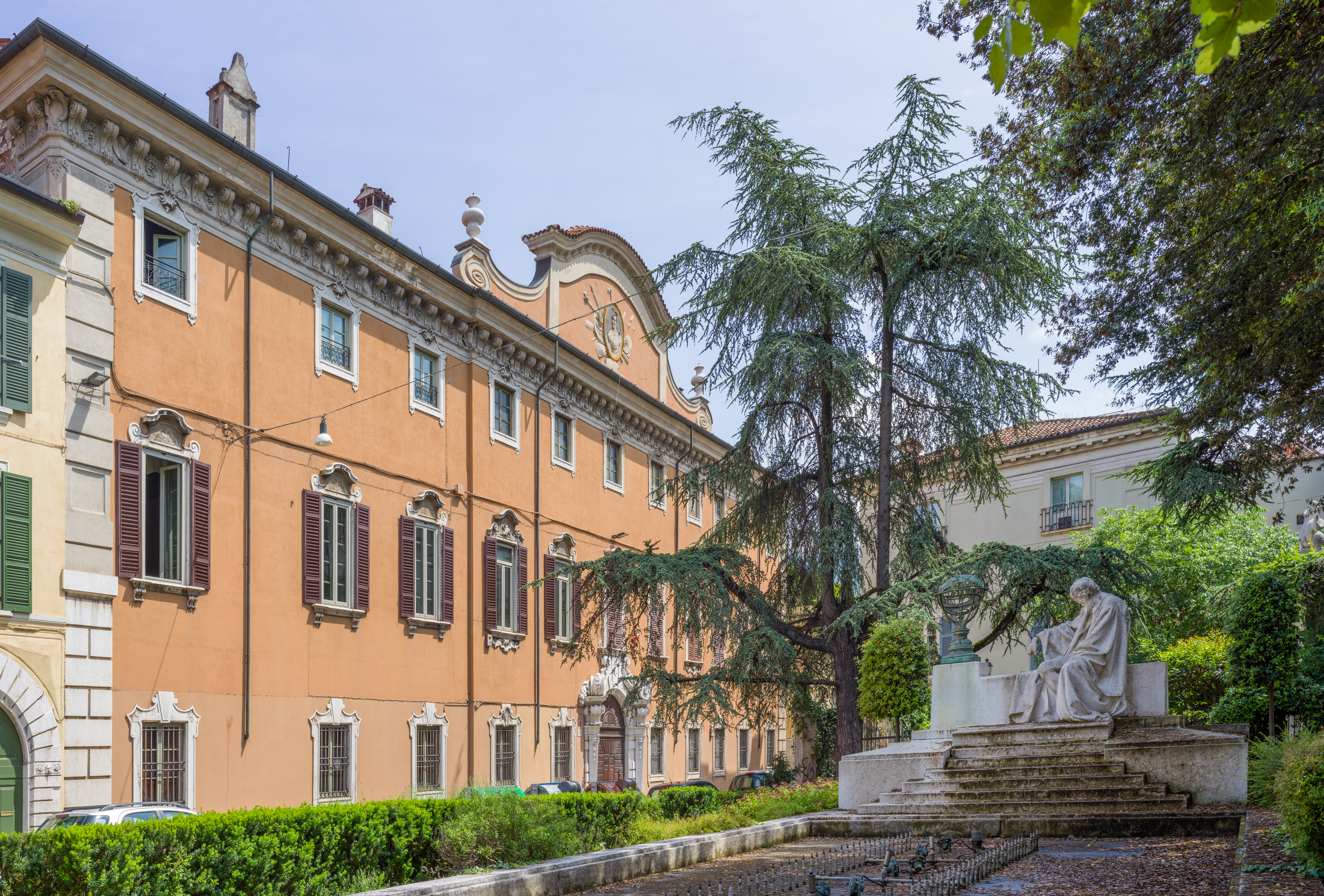
Bruni Conter Palace and Niccolò Tartaglia statue

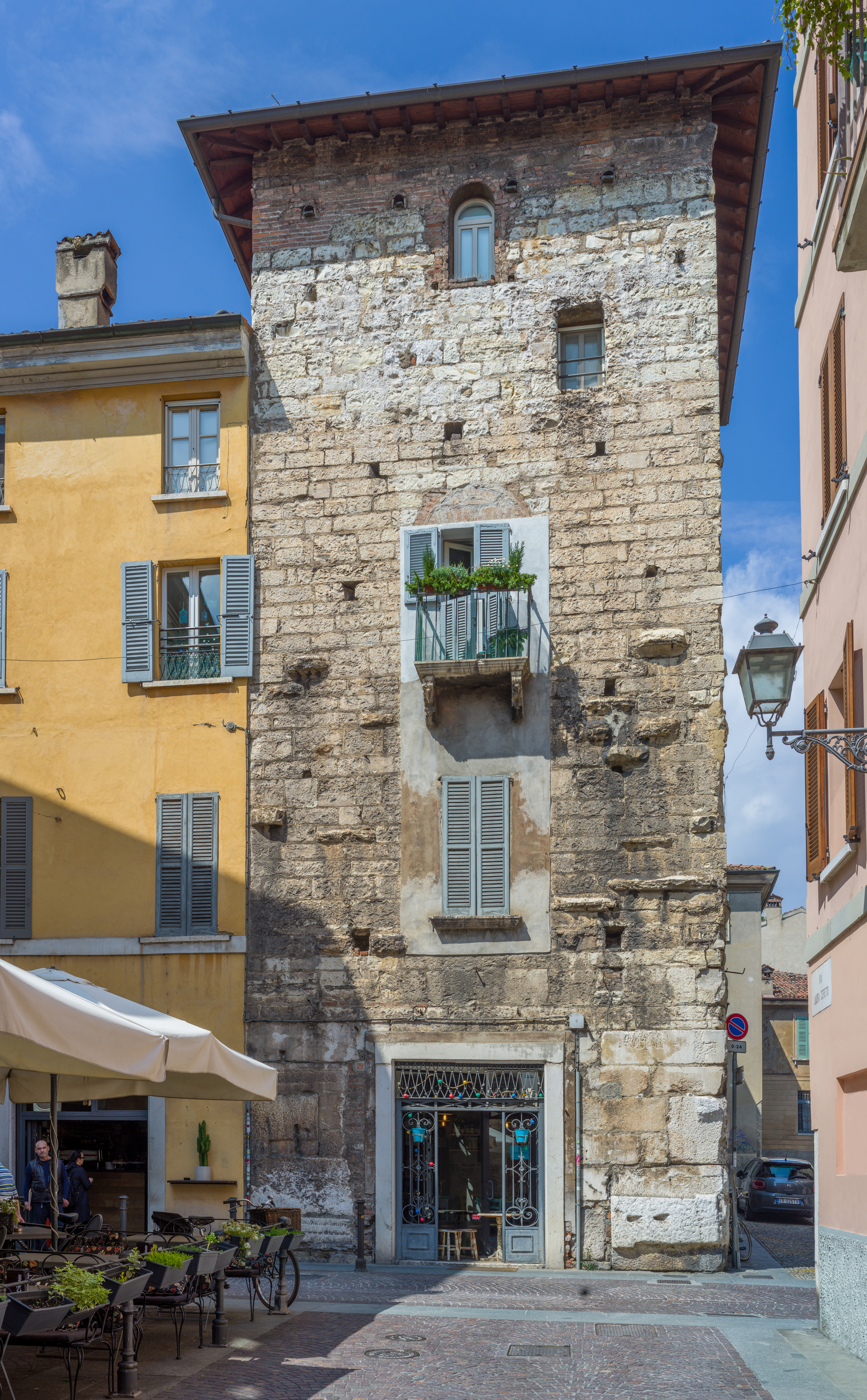
Torre d'Ercole

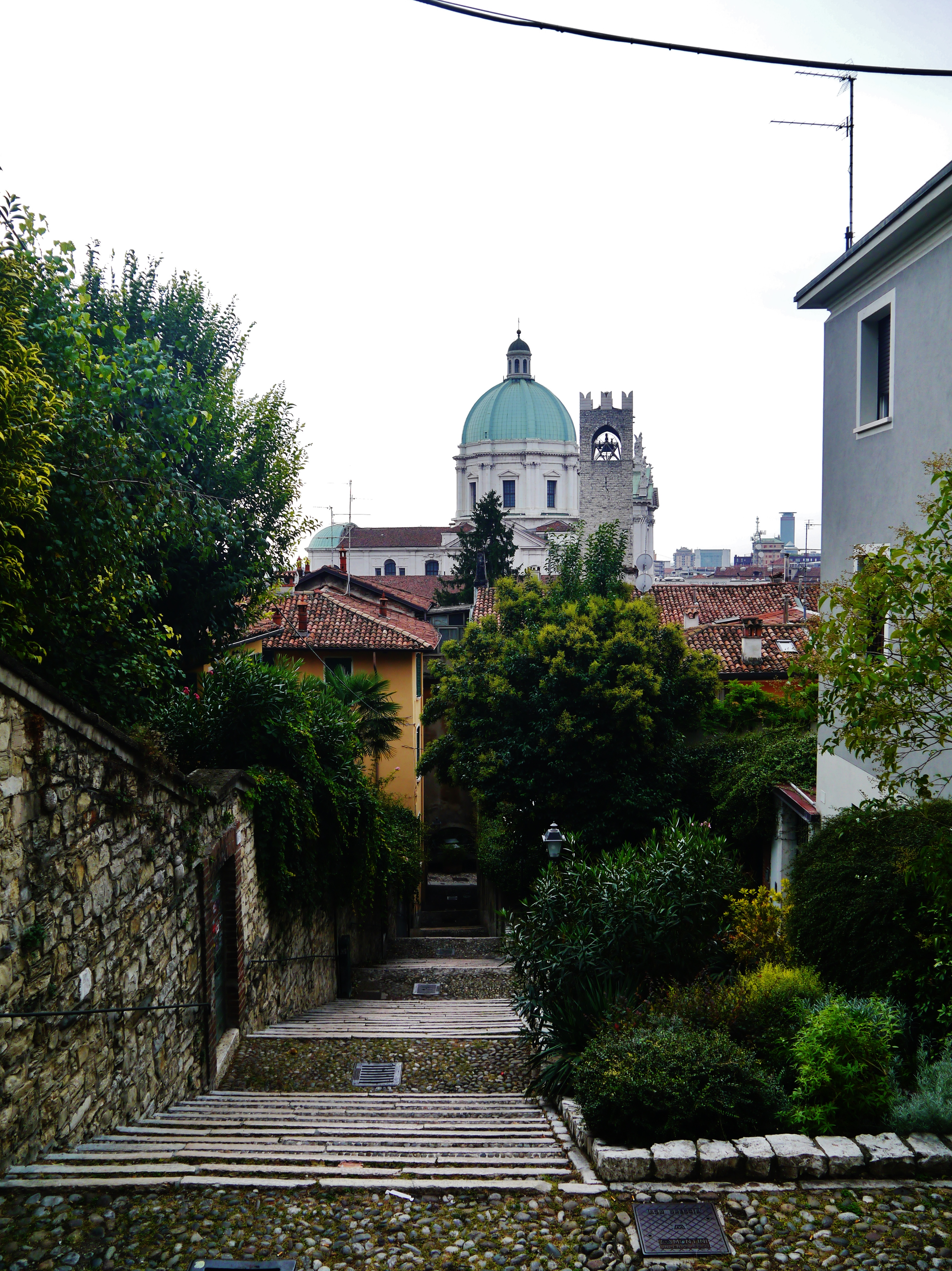
Steps in the old town

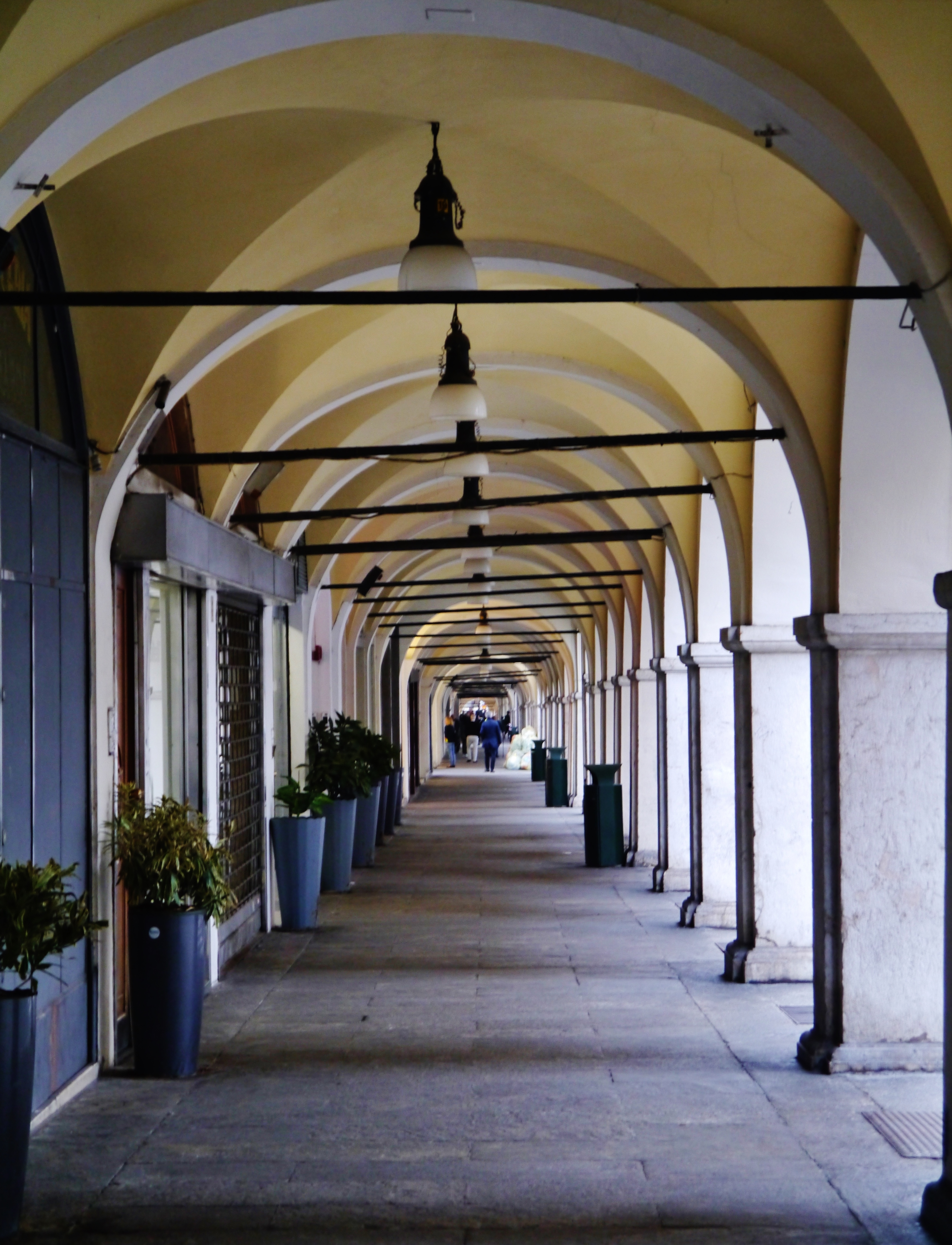
Arcades

=== Fountains ===
For many years Brescia has been considered a "city of water" due to the presence of many canals and natural waterways, as the French author Paul de Musset (1804–1880) once wrote: "The wide streets and numerous fountains give it an air of a big city. Water gushes in the squares and circulates in private homes almost as abundantly as in Rome".

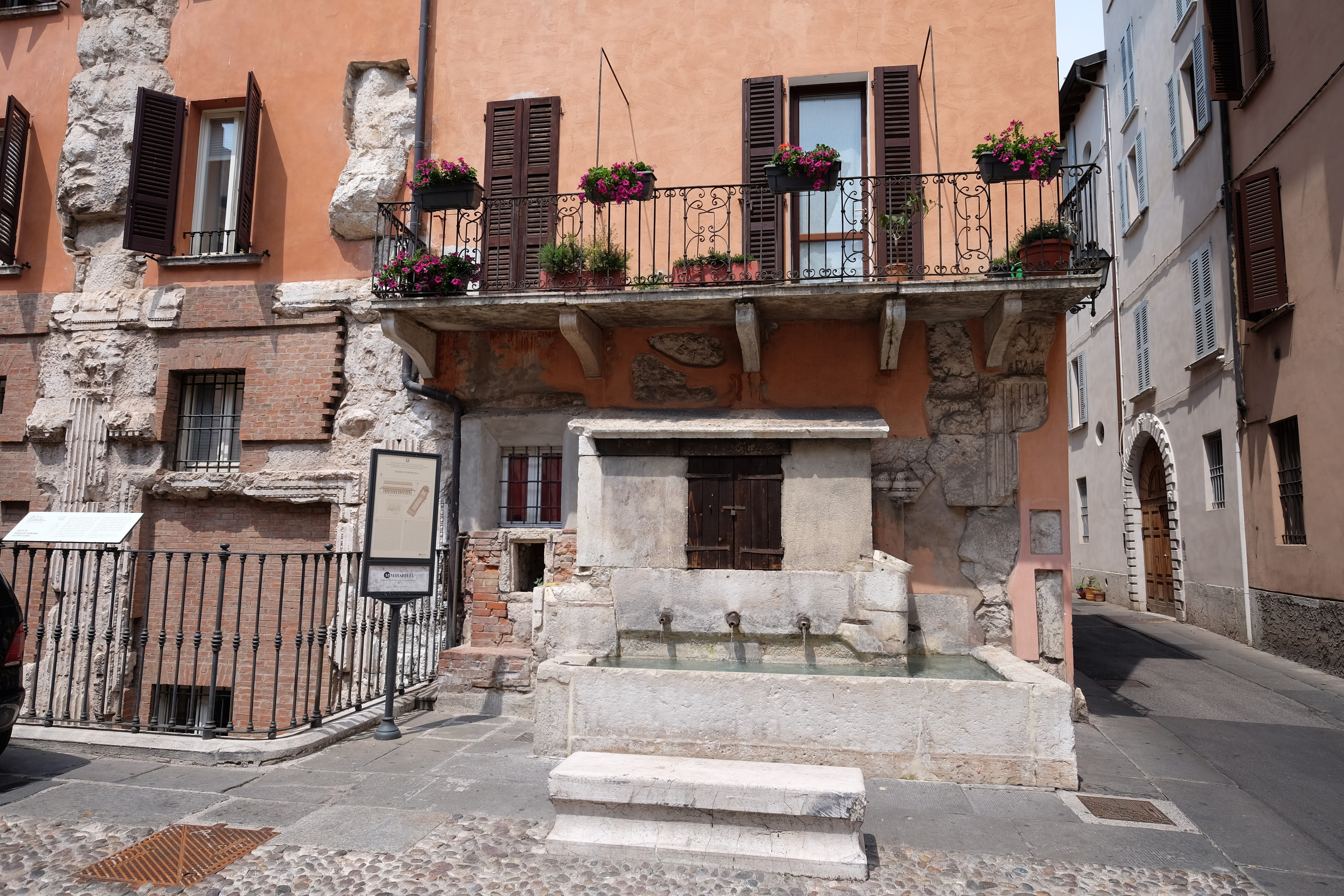
Medieval fountain

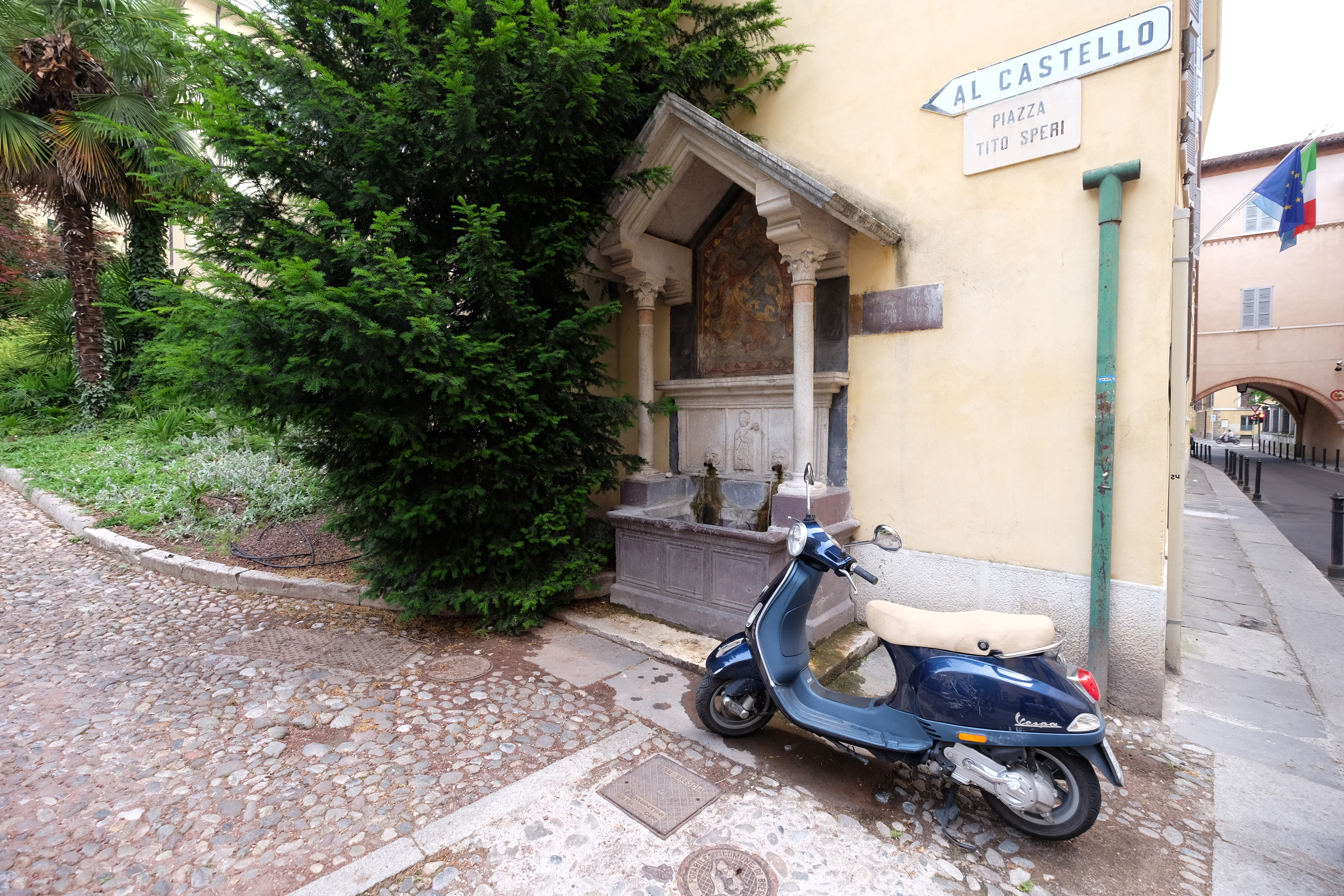
Tagliaferri fountain

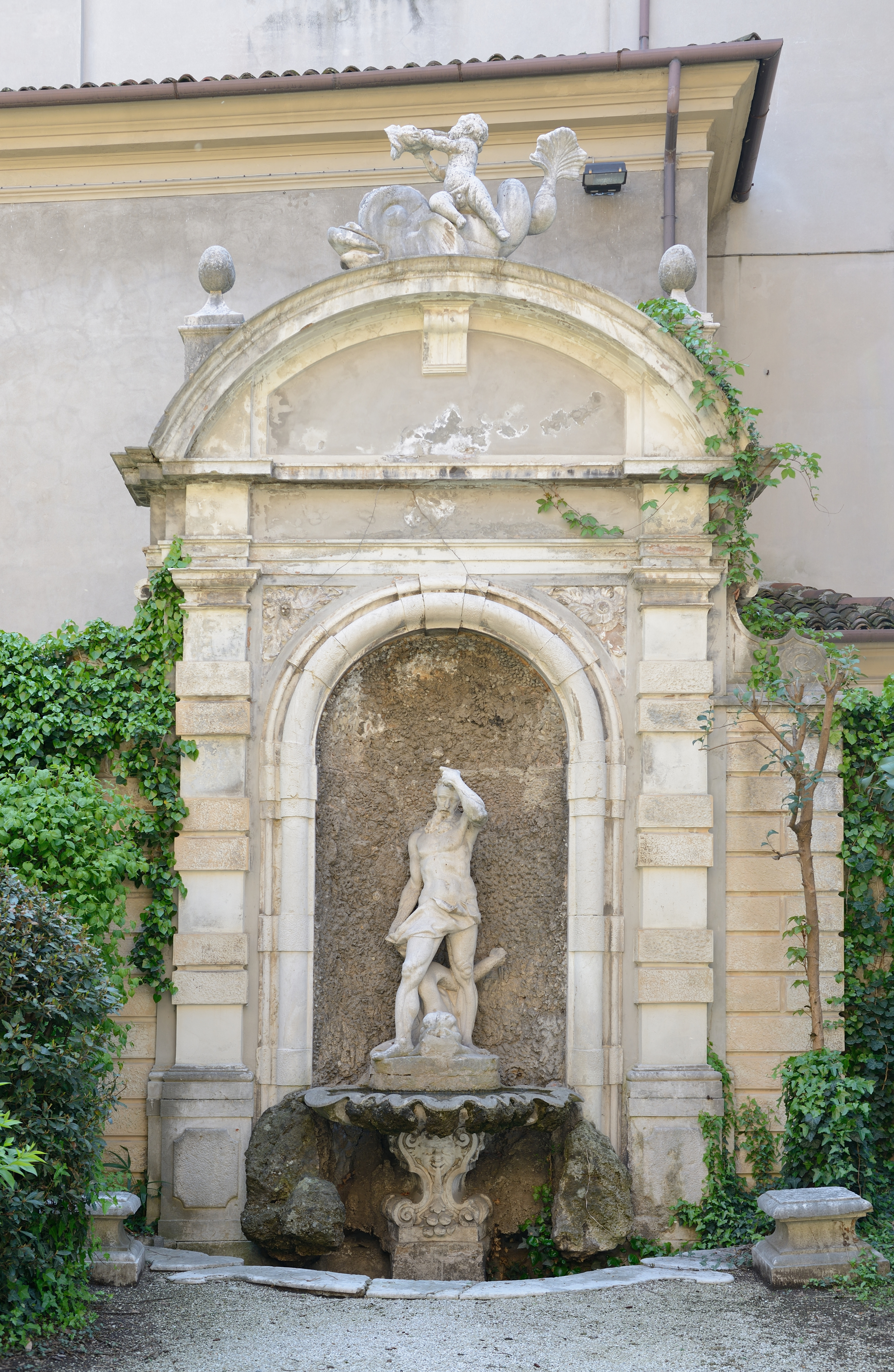
Neptune fountain

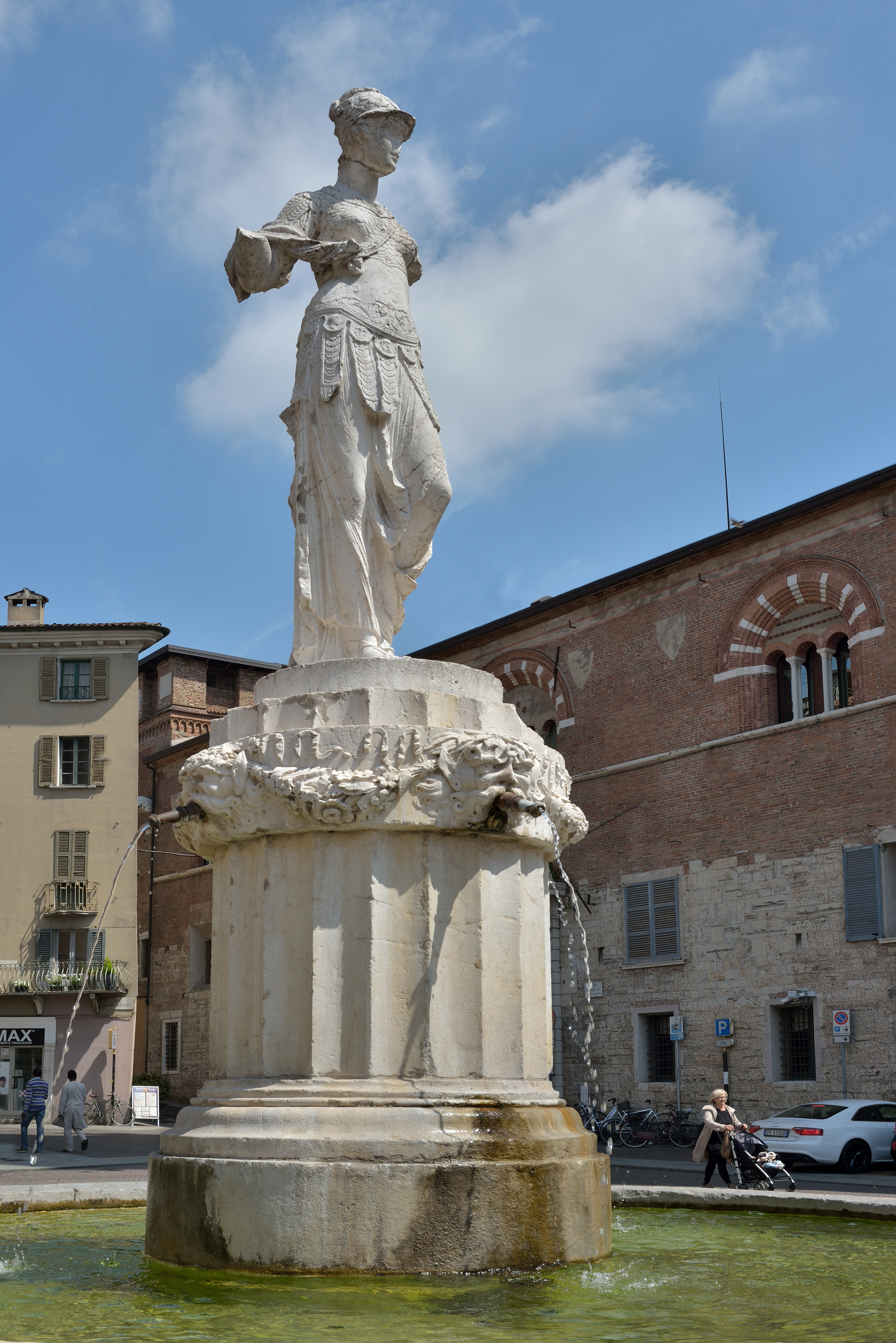
Minerva fountain

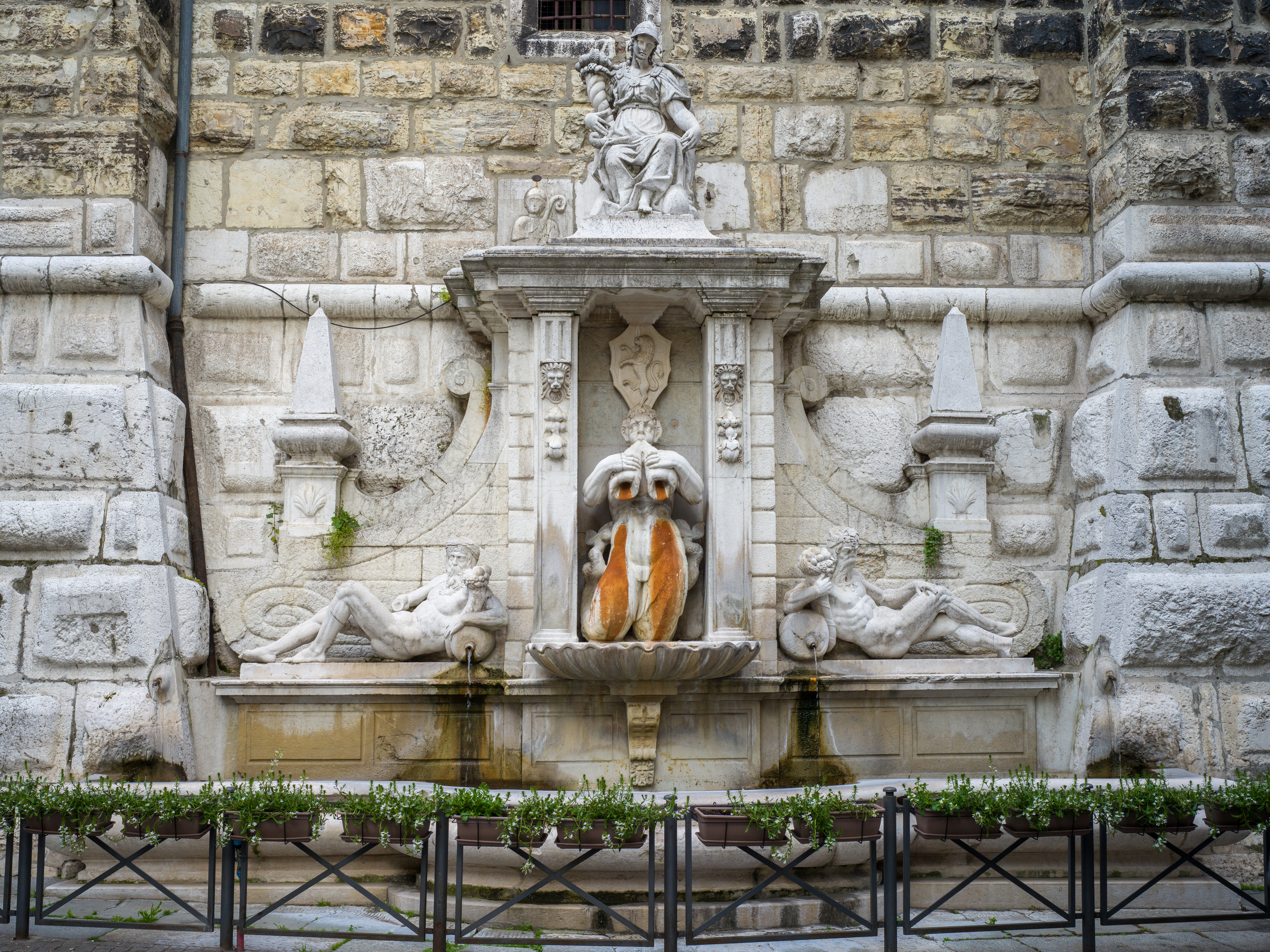
Pallata fountain

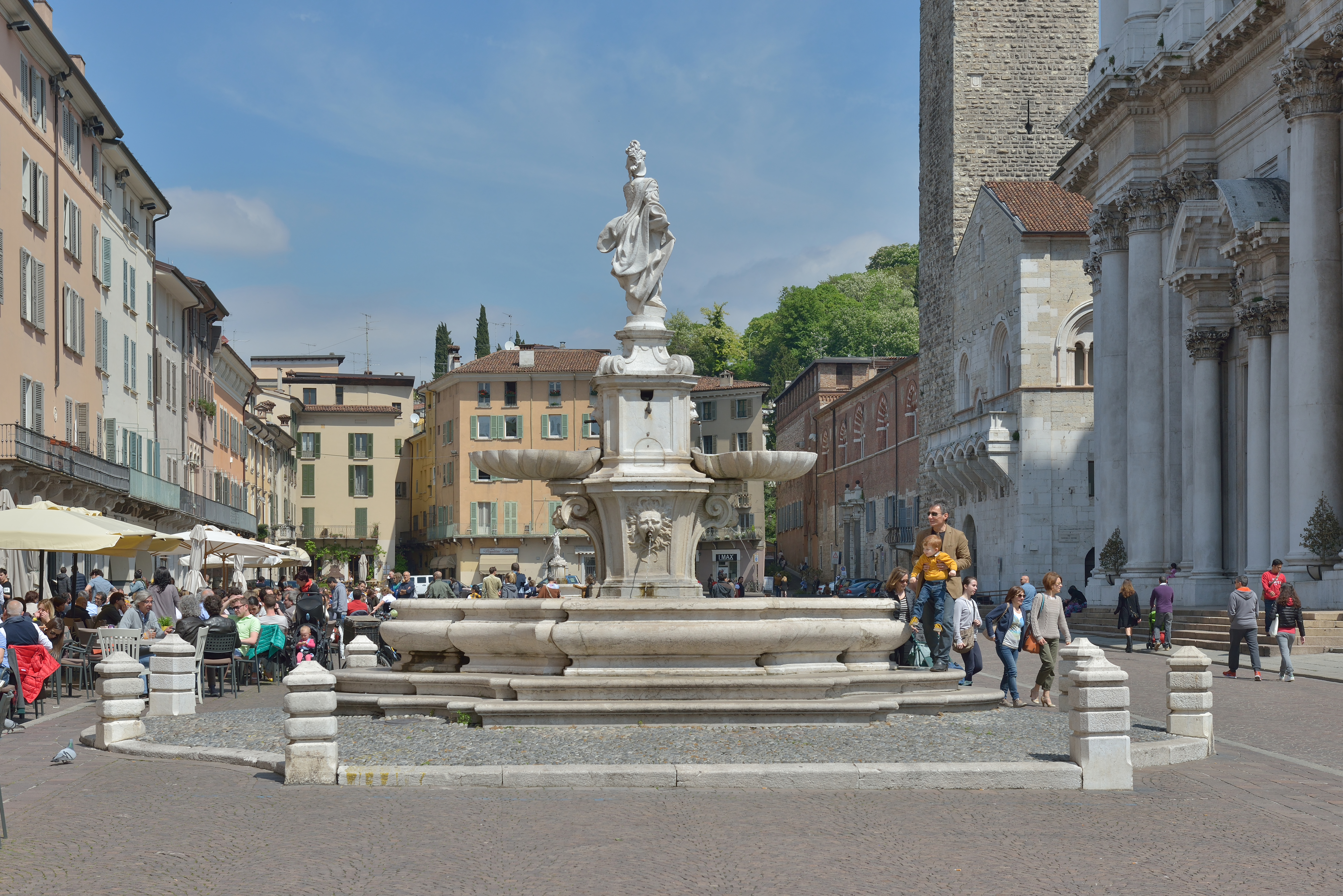
Armed Brescia fountain

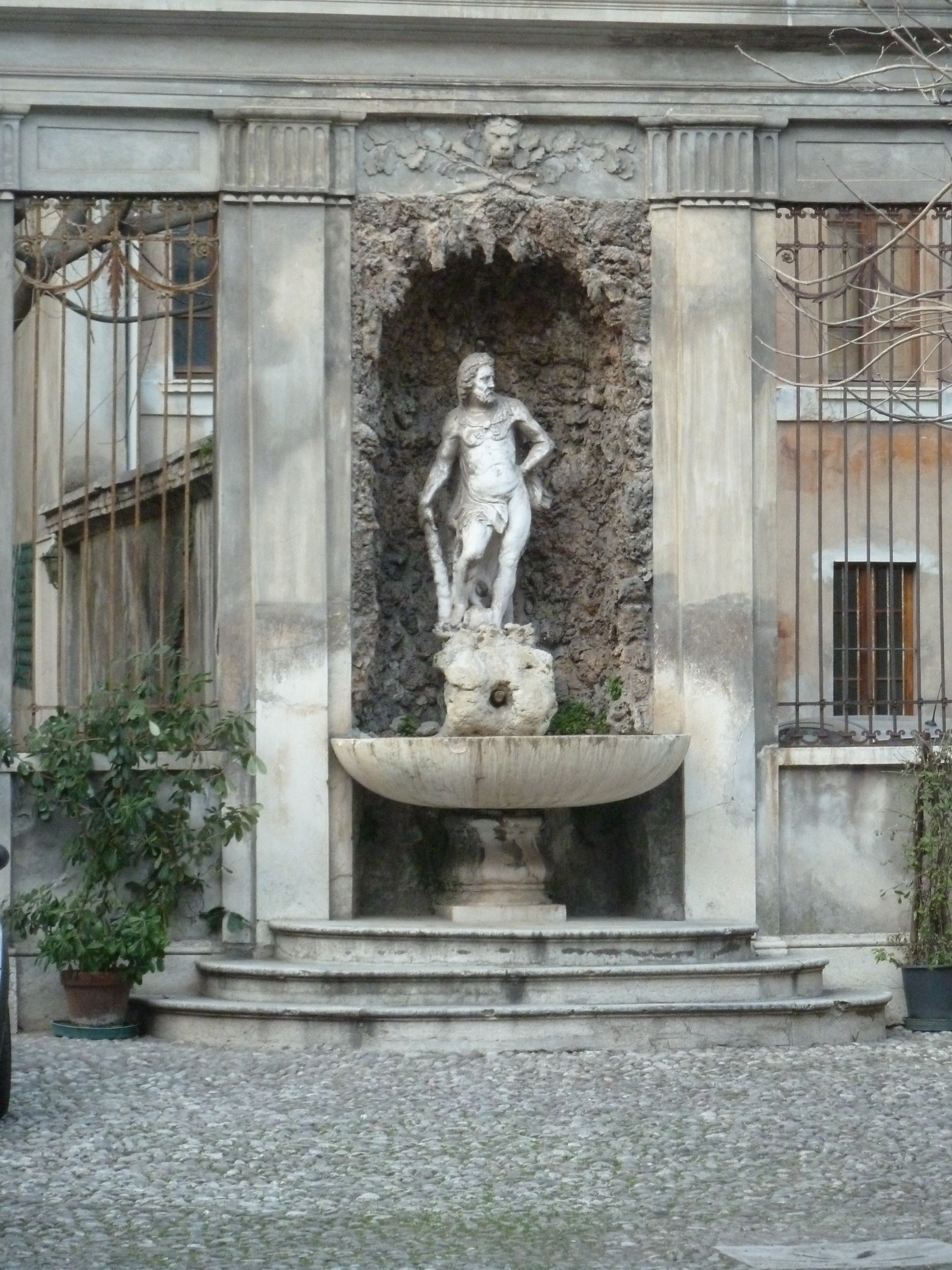
Private fountain

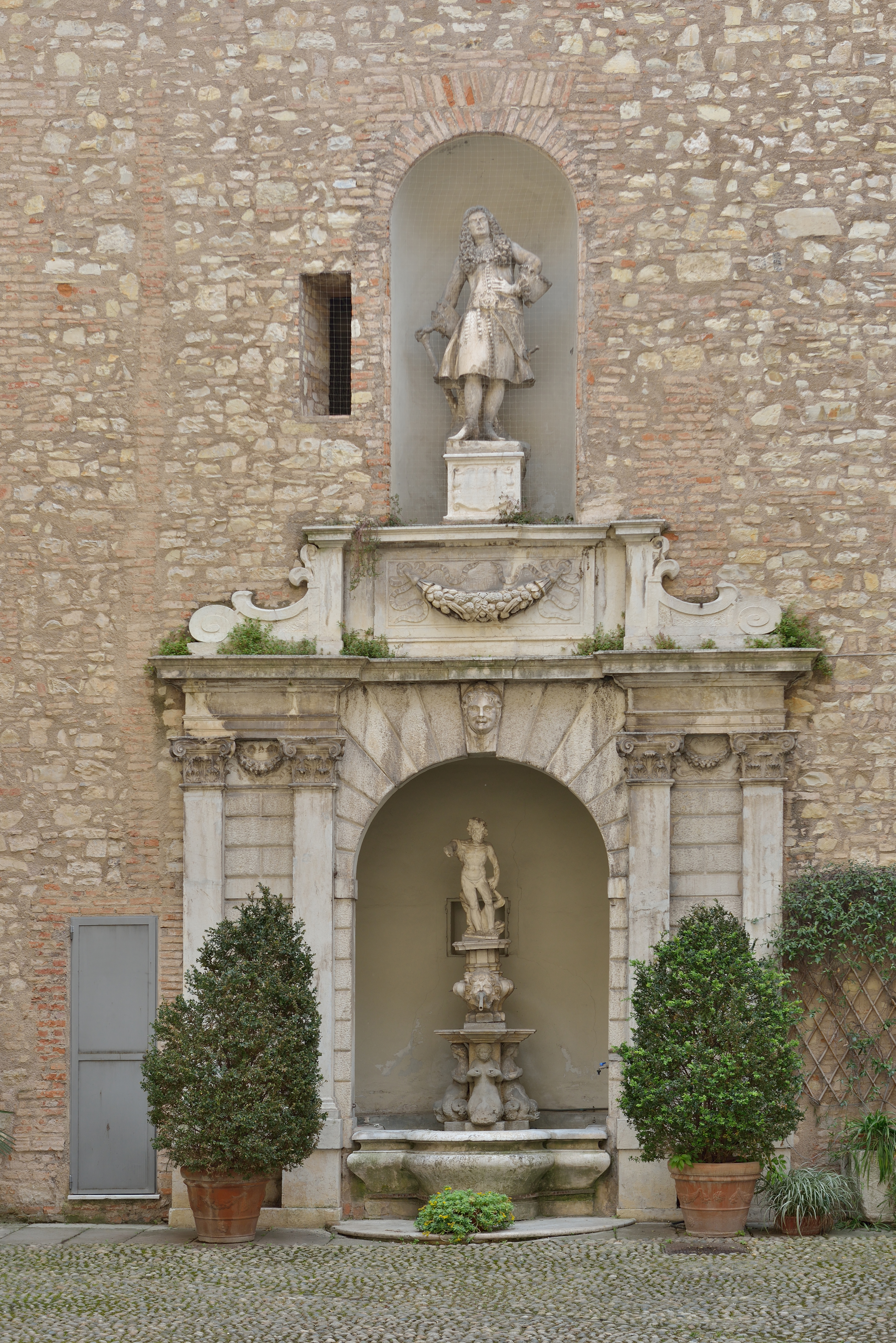
Private fountain

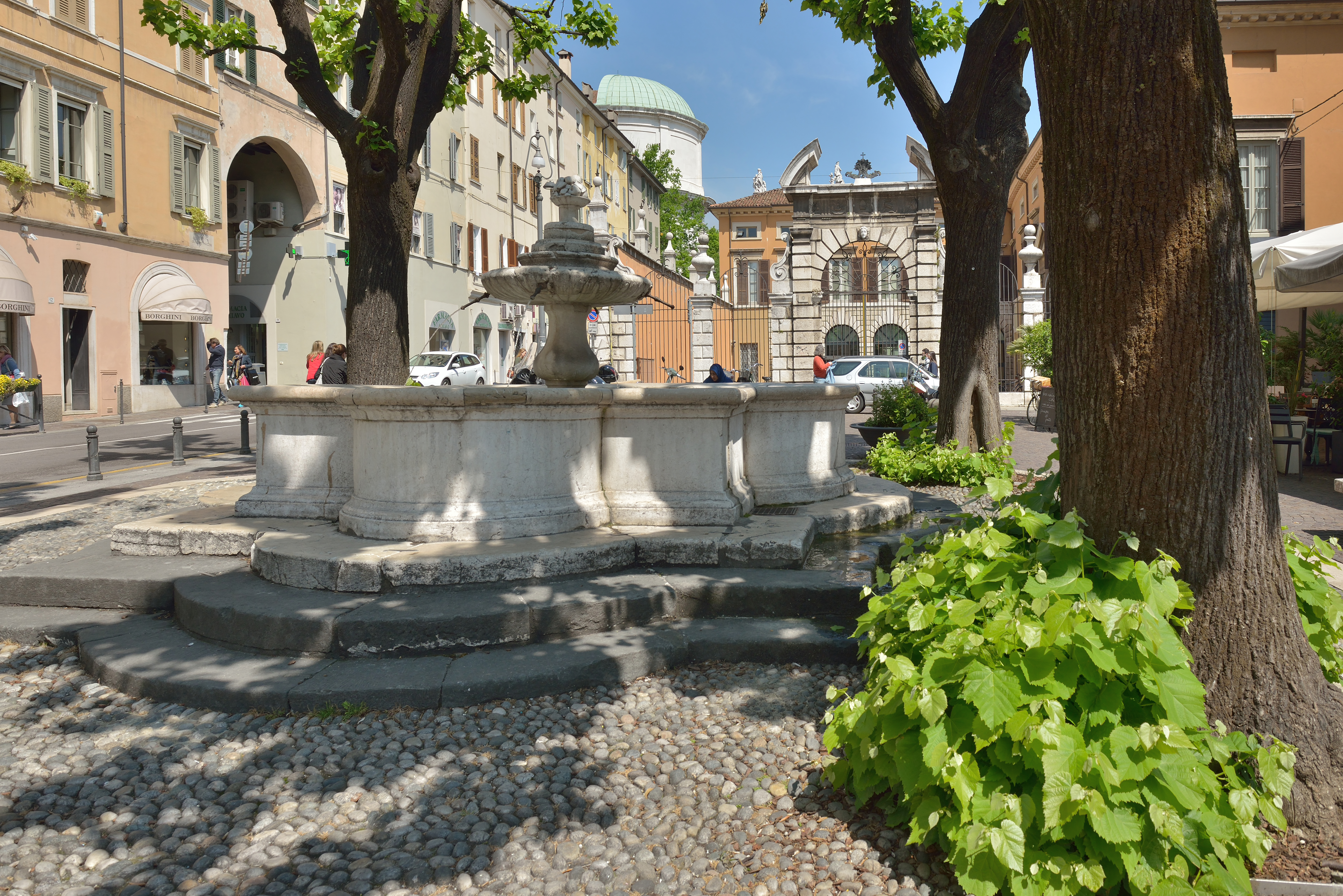
Vescovado fountain

== Cultural references ==
=== Astronomy ===
The minor planet 521 Brixia is named after the city.

== See also ==
- Bishopric of Brescia
- University of Brescia
- Gaifami Palace

== Bibliography ==
Brescia 1849 la Compagnia della Stampa Gianluigi Valotti Anno edizione: 2018
