= List of Brescia Metro stations =

The following is a list of the stations on the Brescia Metro, a rapid transit system in Brescia, Italy.

== Operational ==
| Name | Grade |
|---|---|
| Prealpino | Located in a cut |
| Casazza | Located in a cut |
| Mompiano | Located in a cut |
| Europa | Located in a cut |
| Ospedale | Underground |
| Marconi | Underground |
| San Faustino | Underground |
| Vittoria | Underground |
| Stazione FS | Underground |
| Bresciadue | Underground |
| A2A Lamarmora | Underground |
| Volta | Underground |
| Poliambulanza | Surface |
| San Polo Parco | Surface |
| San Polo Cimabue | Located in a cut |
| Sanpolino | Elevated |
| San Eufemia-Buffalora | Elevated |
