= San Polo (Brescia Metro) =

Metro station in Brescia, Italy

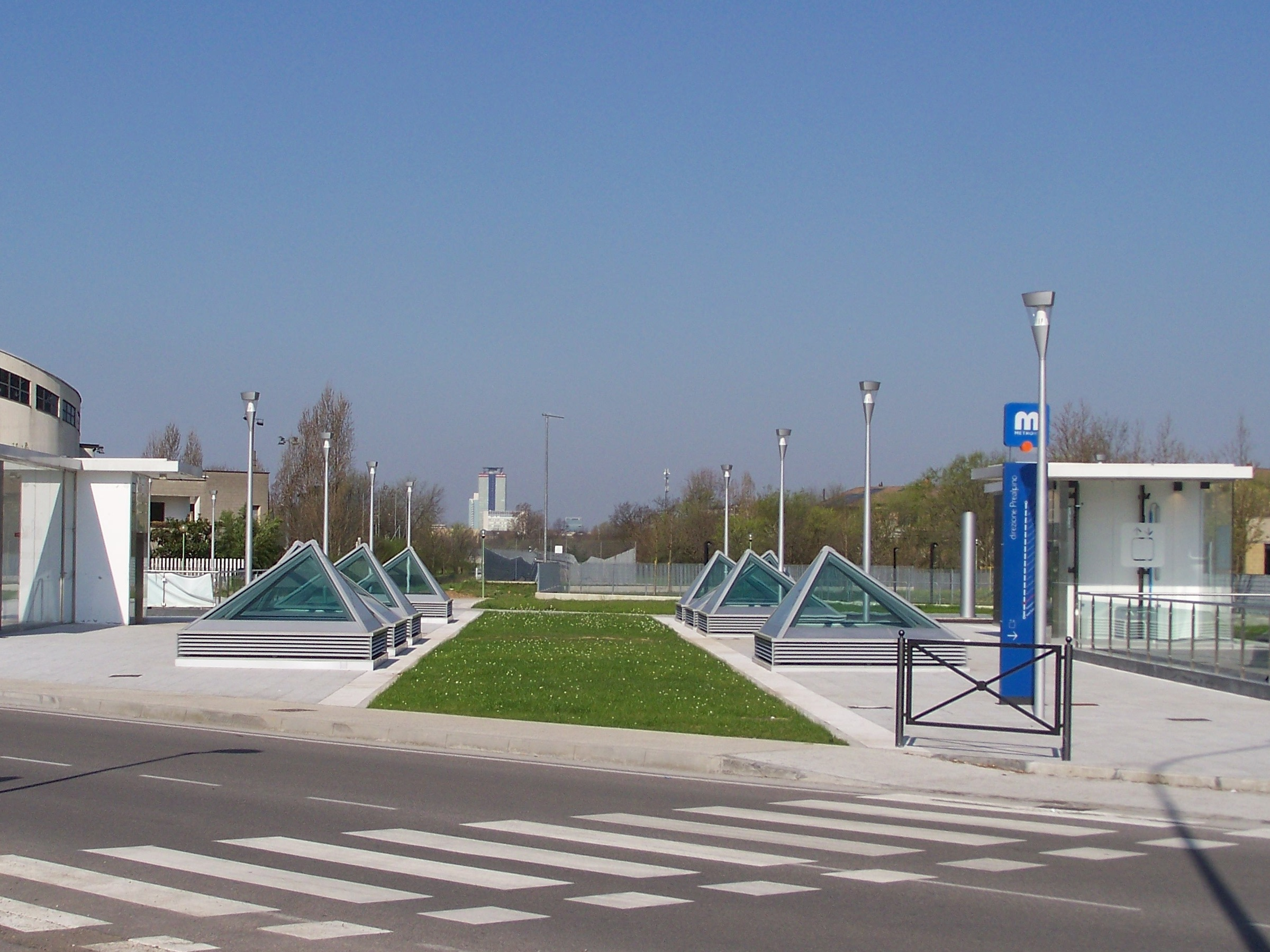

General information
- Location: Via Cimabue, San Polo, Brescia; Italy
- Coordinates: 45°31′06″N 10°15′28″E
- Operator: Brescia Mobilità
- Connections: Bus

Construction
- Structure type: underground
- Accessible: Yes

History
- Opened: 2 March 2013

Services
Preceding station	Brescia Metro	Following station
San Polo Parco towards Prealpino	Brescia Metro	Sanpolino towards Sant'Eufemia
Location

San Polo is a station of the Brescia Metro, in the city of Brescia in northern Italy. The station is centrally located in the populous district of San Polo.

Although the station is officially designated as just "San Polo", it is usually referred to as "Cimabue" to distinguish it from the "San Polo Parco" station.

With its 20,000 inhabitants San Polo is one of the most densely populated districts of Brescia and most people get to the station by bus, the bus stop is right in front of the stairs, on foot or by bicycle. Because the station primarily serves the neighbourhood and is not a transportation hub there are only about thirty parking spaces along the street. In the immediate vicinity there are two schools to the north and south, and the Church of Saint Angela Merici to the west.

== Connecting buses ==
- 9 - Violino - Badia - Milano - Centro - Foro Boario - S.Polo Case - Sanpolino - Buffalora
