= Ospedale (Brescia Metro) =

Metro station in Brescia, Italy

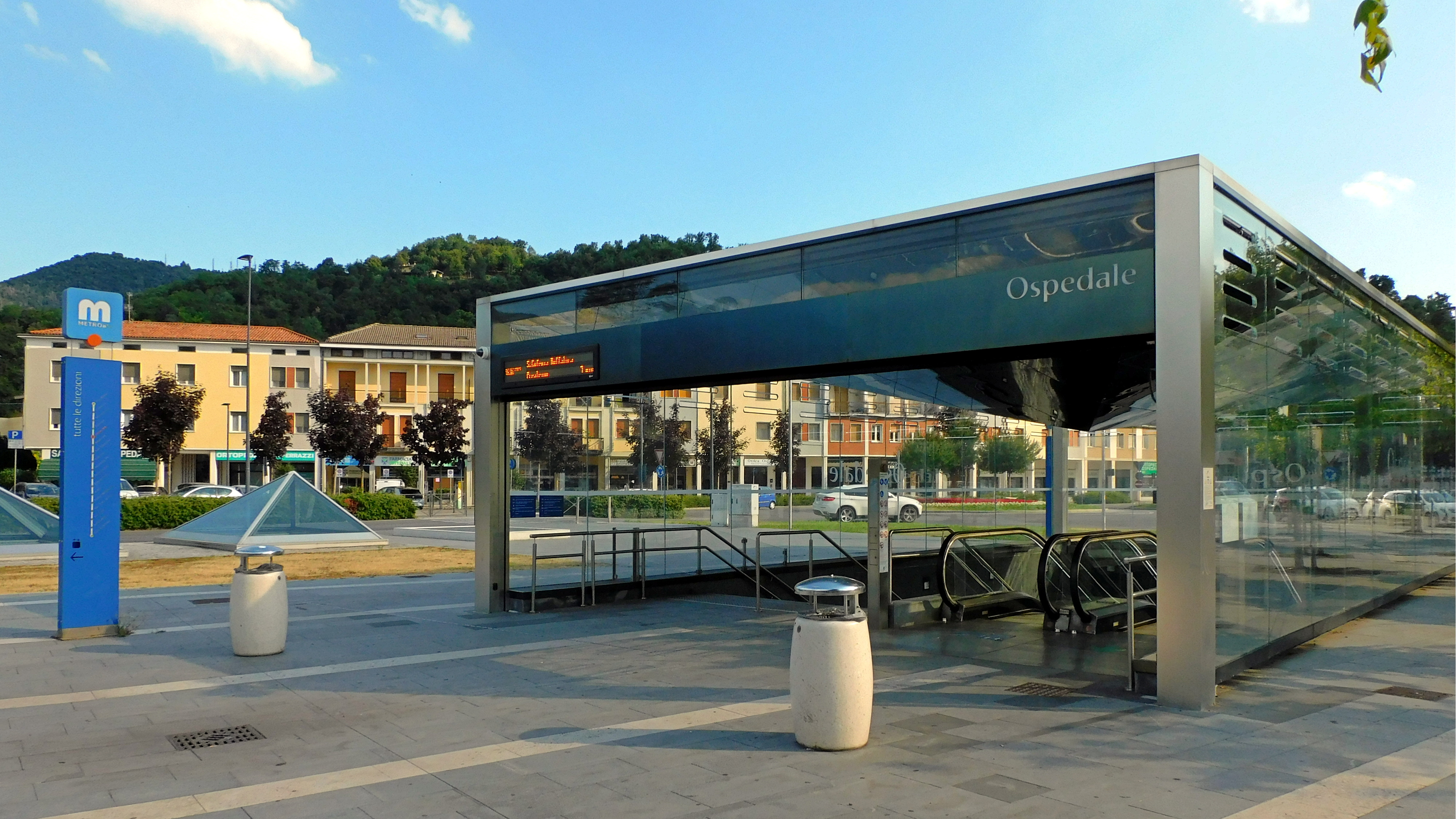
- Entrance of Ospedale Metro station

General information
- Location: Piazzale Spedali Civili, Brescia; Italy
- Coordinates: 45°33′20″N 10°13′59″E
- Operator: Brescia Mobilità

Construction
- Structure type: underground
- Accessible: Yes

History
- Opened: 2 March 2013

Services
Preceding station	Brescia Metro	Following station
Europa towards Prealpino	Brescia Metro	Marconi towards Sant'Eufemia
Location

Ospedale (English: Hospital) is a station of the Brescia Metro, in the city of Brescia in northern Italy. The station is located in a densely populated area of the city, at the entrance to Spedali Civili di Brescia (Brescia General Hospital), which is the main destination for metro riders.

The reconstruction of the area around the station alleviated many parking problems as well as giving a complete overhaul to the roadways in front of the hospital and making things easier for pedestrians.
