= Mompiano (Brescia Metro) =

Metro station in Brescia, Italy

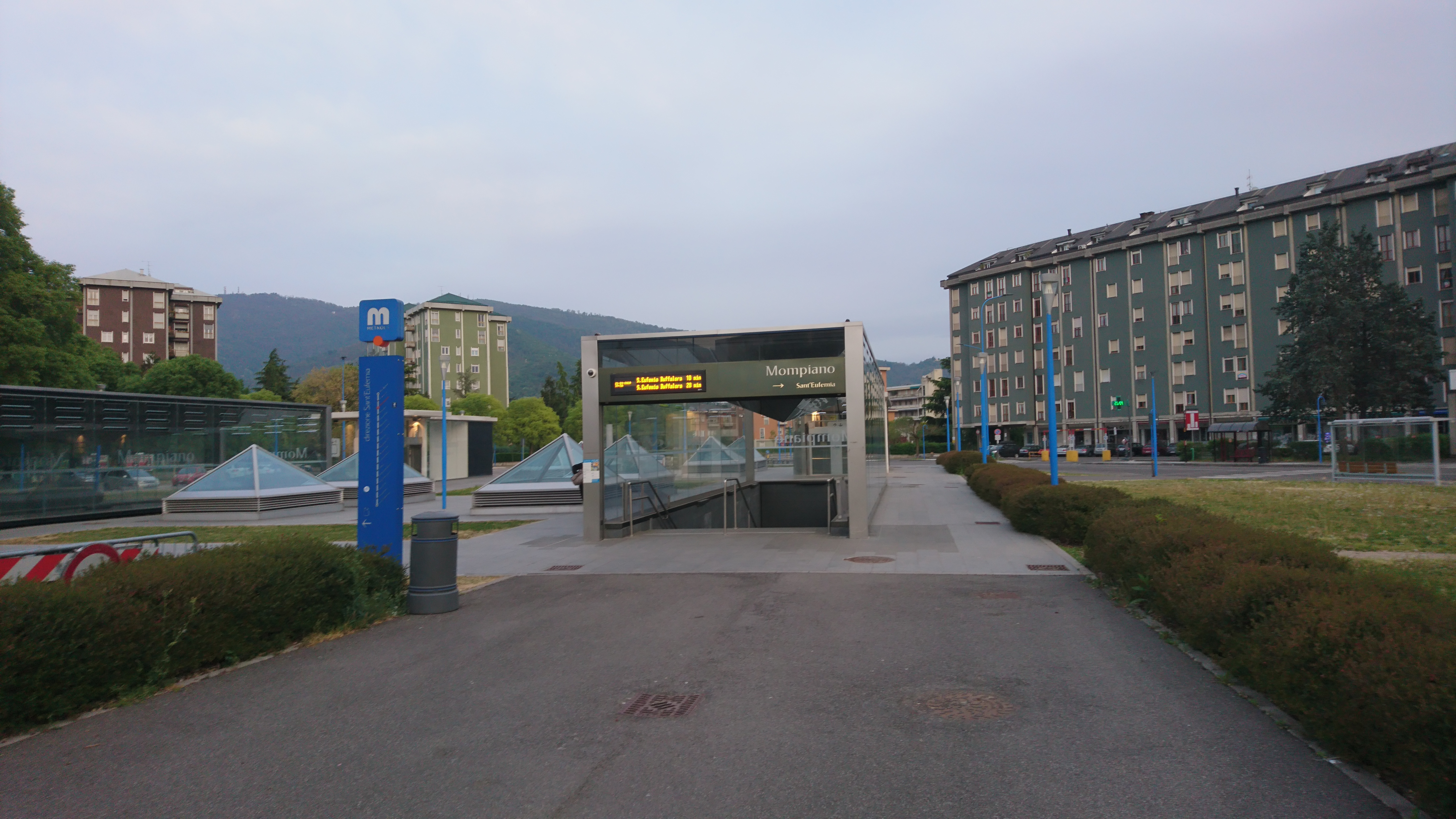

General information
- Location: Brescia; Italy
- Coordinates: 45°34′04″N 10°14′10″E
- Operator: Brescia Mobilità

Construction
- Structure type: underground
- Accessible: Yes

History
- Opened: 2 March 2013

Services
Preceding station	Brescia Metro	Following station
Casazza towards Prealpino	Brescia Metro	Europa towards Sant'Eufemia
Location

Mompiano is a station of the Brescia Metro, in the city of Brescia in northern Italy. The station is located on the west end of what was once a green area, south east of Via Boccaccia and Viale Europa, with the easterly portion now paved over for a parking lot. The Stadio Mario Rigamonti, a destination for football fans, is a short distance directly north, and beyond that lies Parco Benedetto Castelli.

The area adjacent to the station should be subject to increased urbanization, such as the recent construction of two new six storey buildings of 10,000 square feet on the south side. By the definition of public space, the designers have tried to relate the square to the surrounding environment; with the garden of Piazzale Luigi Kossuth, the expansion of parking lots, and taking pedestrian routes into consideration.
