= Vittoria (Brescia Metro) =

Metro station in Brescia, Italy

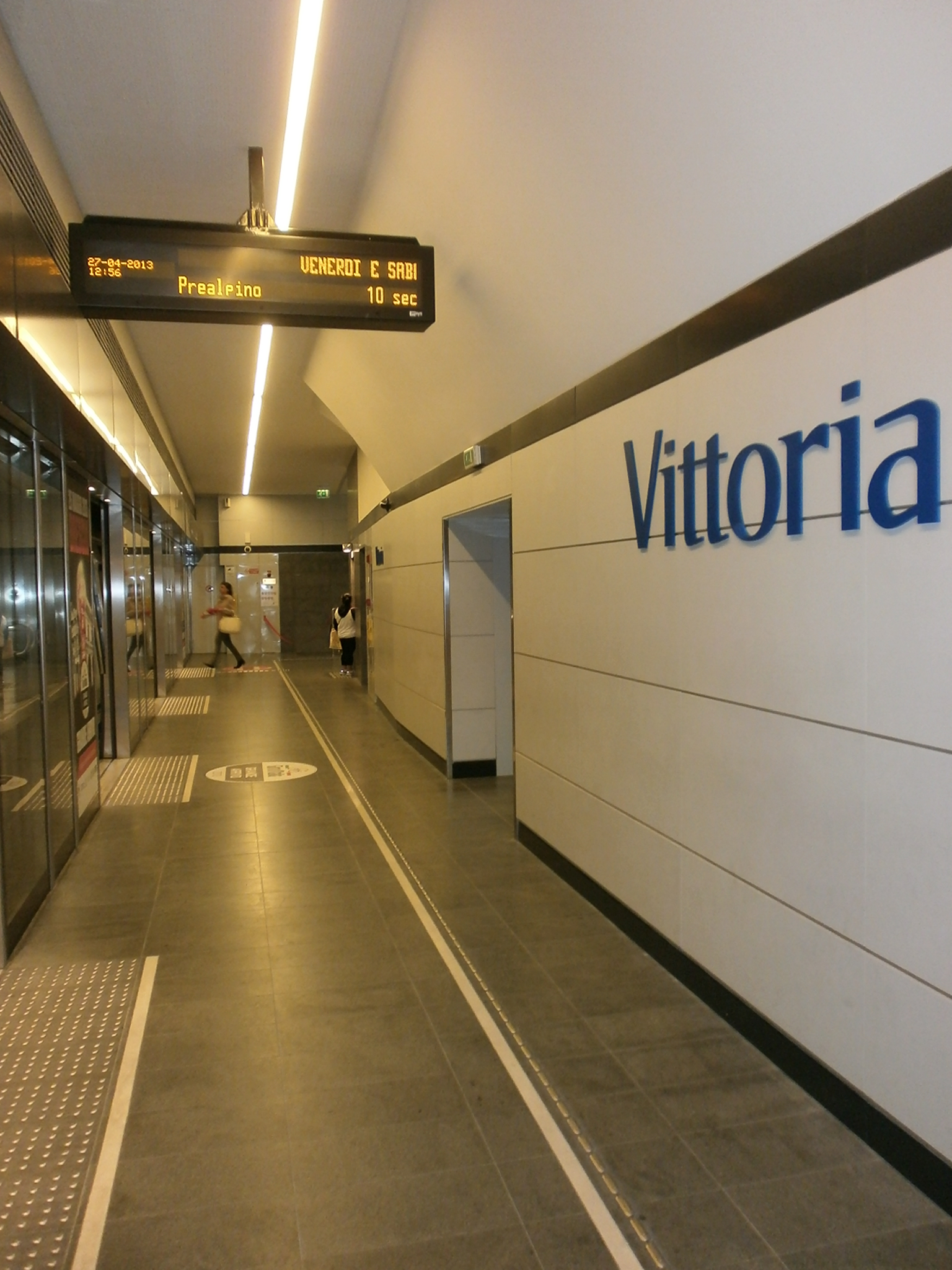

General information
- Location: Piazza della Vittoria, Brescia; Italy
- Coordinates: 45°32′19″N 10°13′07″E
- Operator: Brescia Mobilità

Construction
- Structure type: underground
- Accessible: Yes

History
- Opened: 2 March 2013

Services
Preceding station	Brescia Metro	Following station
San Faustino towards Prealpino	Brescia Metro	Stazione FS towards Sant'Eufemia
Location

Vittoria is a station of the Brescia Metro, in the city of Brescia in northern Italy. The station is in the historic core of the city, in the north-west of the Piazza della Vittoria.

Archaeological discoveries in the old city centre, and at Vittoria the buried ruins of a tower dating back to the later Middle Ages, resulted in a slowdown of the construction work in the area and some design changes.

== Architectural and Artistic Features ==
The station features notable art installations, such as Mind the Gap by Nathalie Du Pasquier. This permanent piece utilizes colorful ceramic tiles from Mutina’s Margherita collection, transforming the station into an immersive abstract artwork.

In 2016, artist Elisabetta Benassi introduced a sound installation at the station. At each hour, a sequence of sentences is broadcast, exploring themes of time, order, and entropy, contrasting with the visual architecture of the surrounding Piazza della Vittoria.
