= Bresciadue (Brescia Metro) =

Metro station in Brescia, Italy

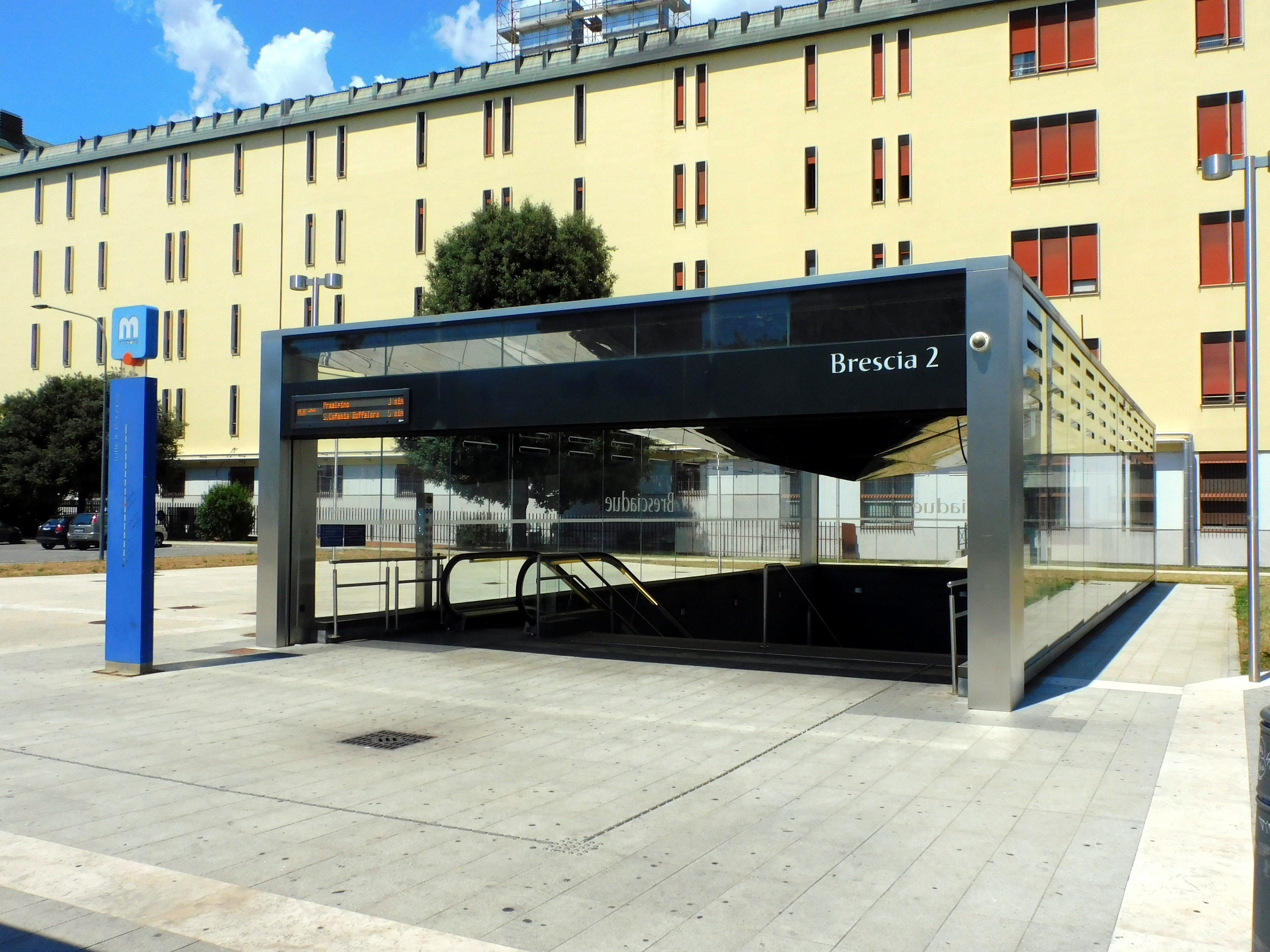

General information
- Location: Via Cefalonia, Brescia; Italy
- Coordinates: 45°31′35″N 10°12′45″E
- Operator: Brescia Mobilità

Construction
- Structure type: underground
- Accessible: Yes

History
- Opened: 2 March 2013

Services
Preceding station	Brescia Metro	Following station
Stazione FS towards Prealpino	Brescia Metro	Lamarmora towards Sant'Eufemia
Location
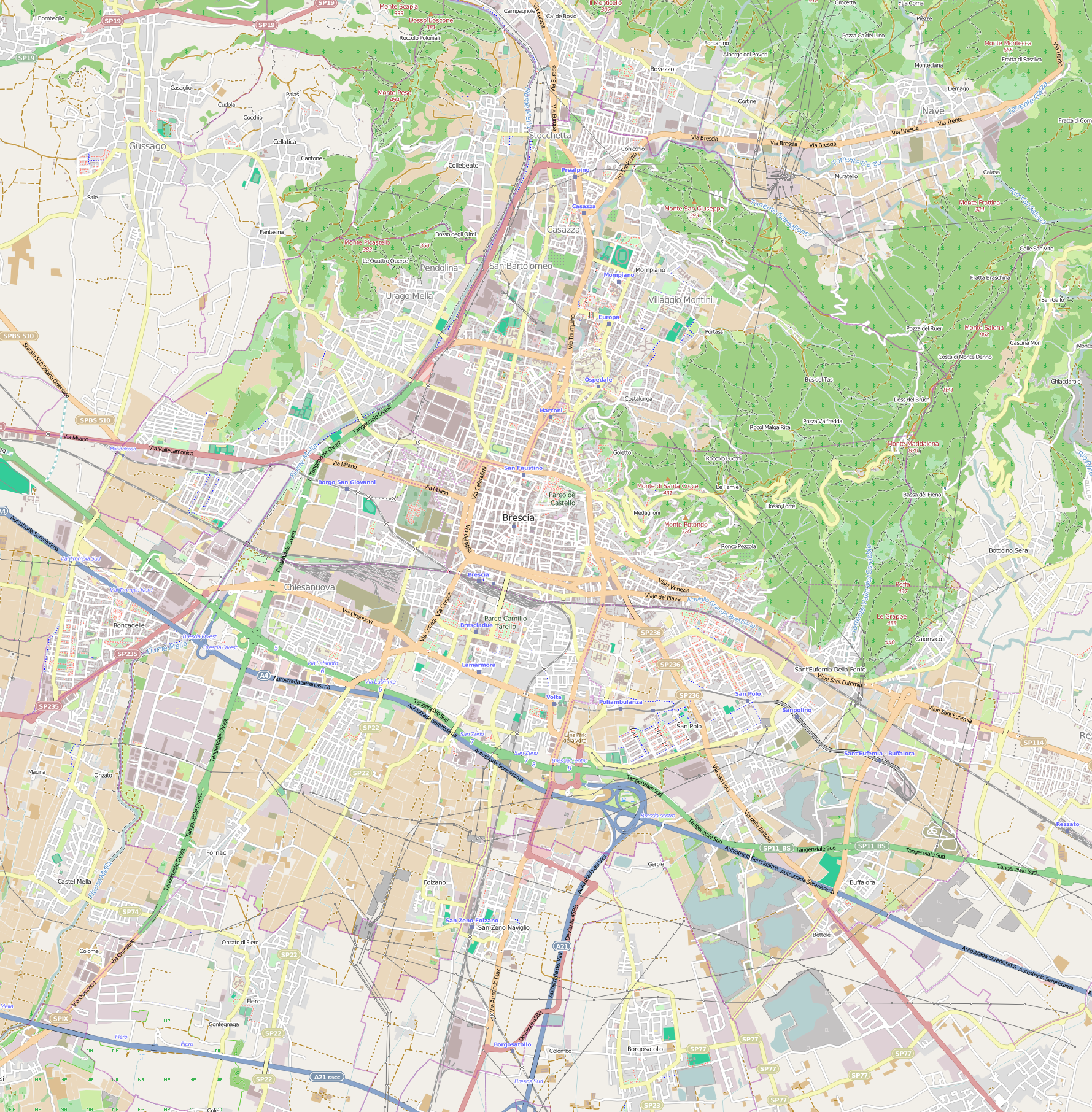
- Location within Brescia

Bresciadue (BS2) is a station of the Brescia Metro, in the city of Brescia in northern Italy.

The station is located in an area of new business developments and office complexes. It is near the headquarters of Telecom Italia and UBI Banca, and the Crystal Palace, one of the tallest buildings in Italy.
