= Poliambulanza (Brescia Metro) =

Metro station in Brescia, Italy

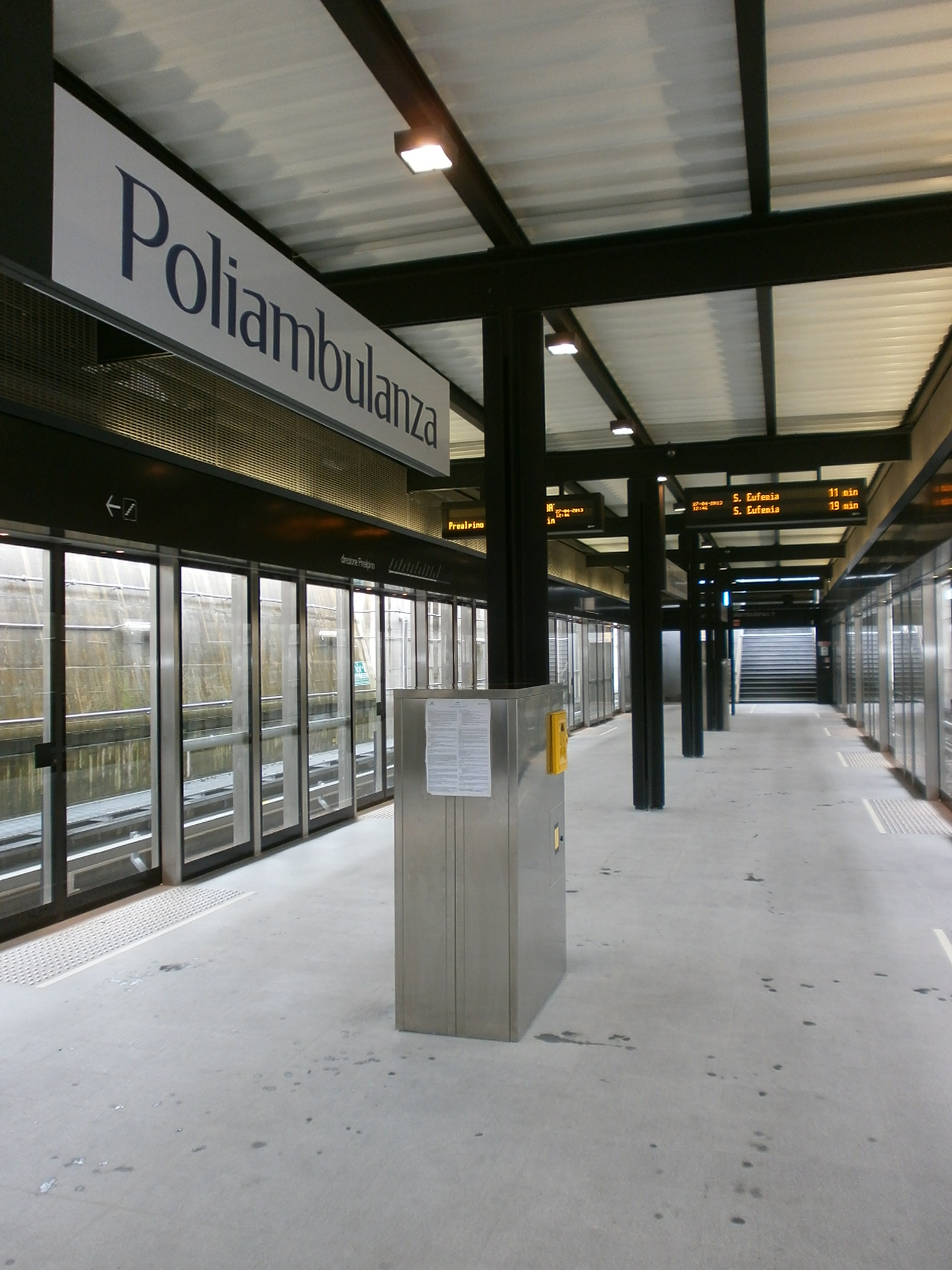

General information
- Location: Brescia; Italy
- Coordinates: 45°31′02″N 10°14′12″E
- Operator: Brescia Mobilità

Construction
- Structure type: underground
- Parking: park and ride
- Accessible: Yes

History
- Opened: 2 March 2013

Services
Preceding station	Brescia Metro	Following station
Volta towards Prealpino	Brescia Metro	San Polo Parco towards Sant'Eufemia
Location

Poliambulanza is a station of the Brescia Metro, in the city of Brescia in northern Italy. The station is named after the nearby "Fondazione Poliambulanza Istituto Ospedaliero" hospital.

With the opening of a new access road to the city from the south, the station is easily accessible from the Brescia ring road, Autostrada A4 and Autostrada A21. In addition to the existing hospital parking, a new park and ride lot with a capacity of 360 vehicles was added.
