= Stazione FS (Brescia Metro) =

Metro station in Brescia, Italy

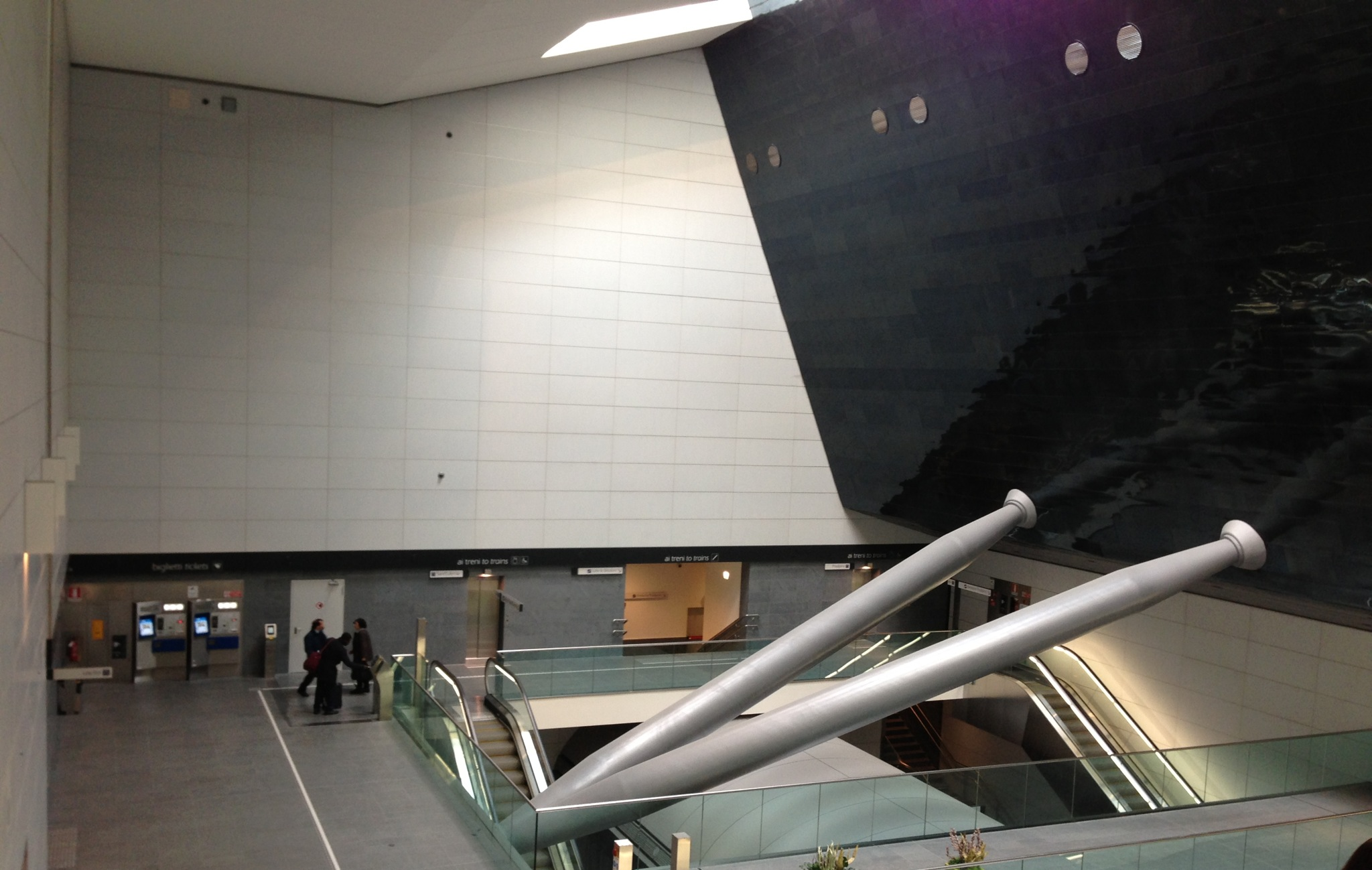

General information
- Location: Viale della Stazione, Brescia; Italy
- Coordinates: 45°31′55″N 10°12′55″E
- Operator: Brescia Mobilità
- Connections: Brescia railway station

Construction
- Structure type: underground
- Accessible: Yes

History
- Opened: 2 March 2013

Services
Preceding station	Brescia Metro	Following station
Vittoria towards Prealpino	Brescia Metro	Bresciadue towards Sant'Eufemia
Location
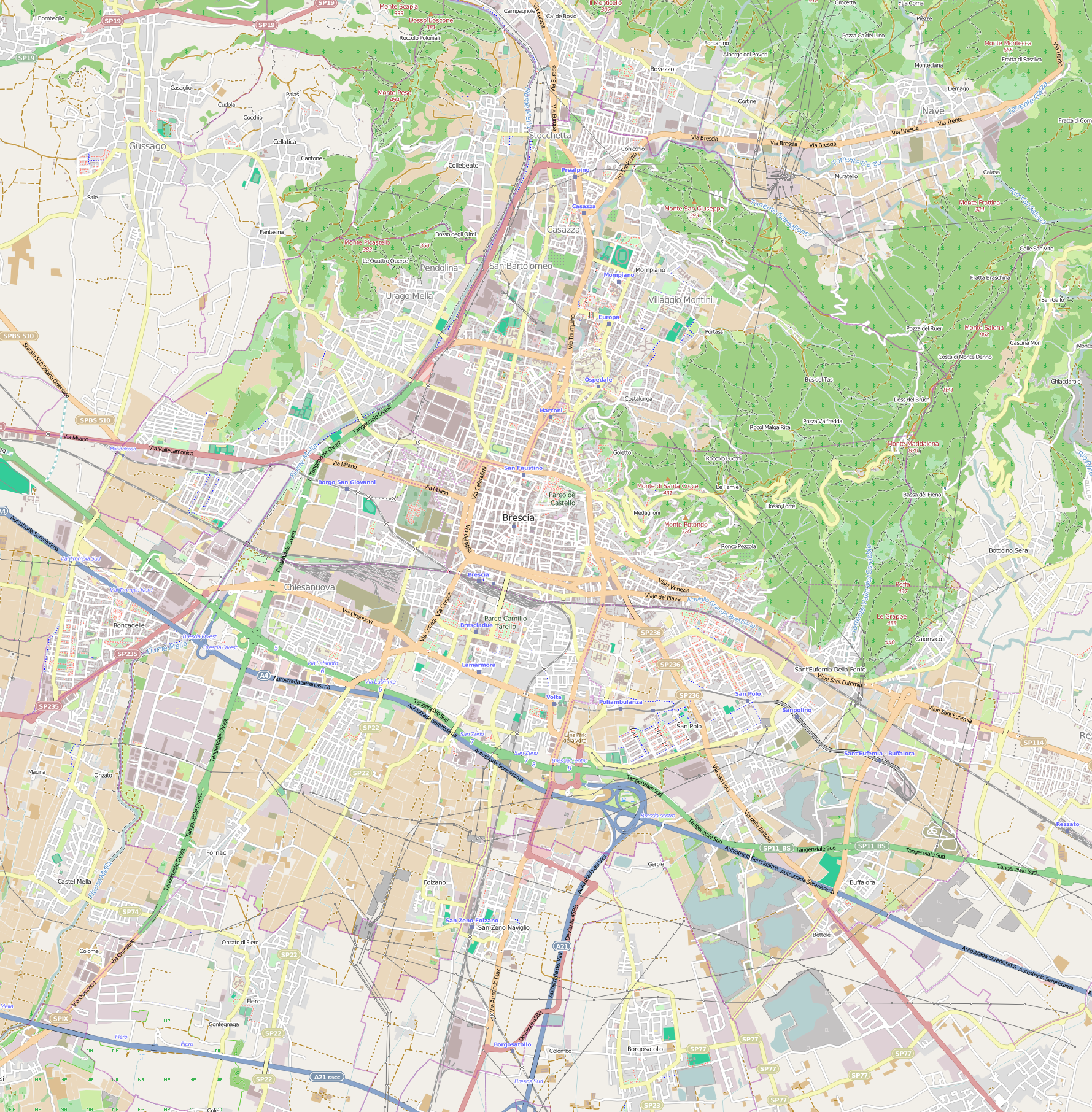
- Location within Brescia

Stazione FS is a station of the Brescia Metro, in the city of Brescia in northern Italy. It is located beside the Brescia railway station near the city centre and close to long distance and local bus stations.

Because of its location as an interchange between many of Brescia's public transport systems, it is the largest and best equipped station on the subway line and has been designed in anticipation of a large flow of passengers.
