= A2A Lamarmora (Brescia Metro) =

Metro station in Brescia, Italy

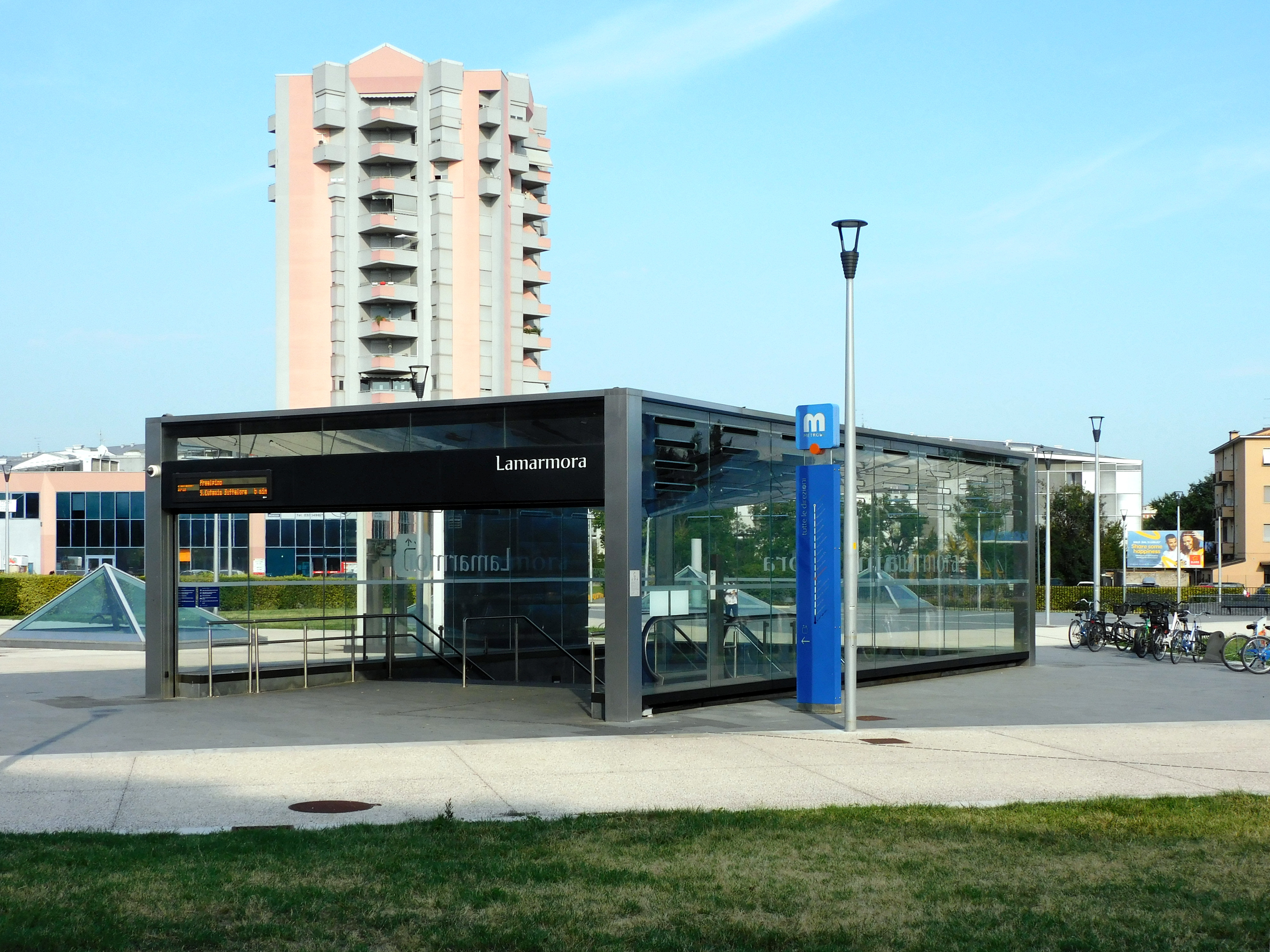

General information
- Location: Via Alessandro Lamarmora, Brescia; Italy
- Coordinates: 45°31′17″N 10°12′47″E
- Operator: Brescia Mobilità
- Connections: Bus

Construction
- Structure type: underground
- Accessible: Yes

History
- Opened: 2 March 2013

Services
Preceding station	Brescia Metro	Following station
Bresciadue towards Prealpino	Brescia Metro	Volta towards Sant'Eufemia
Location
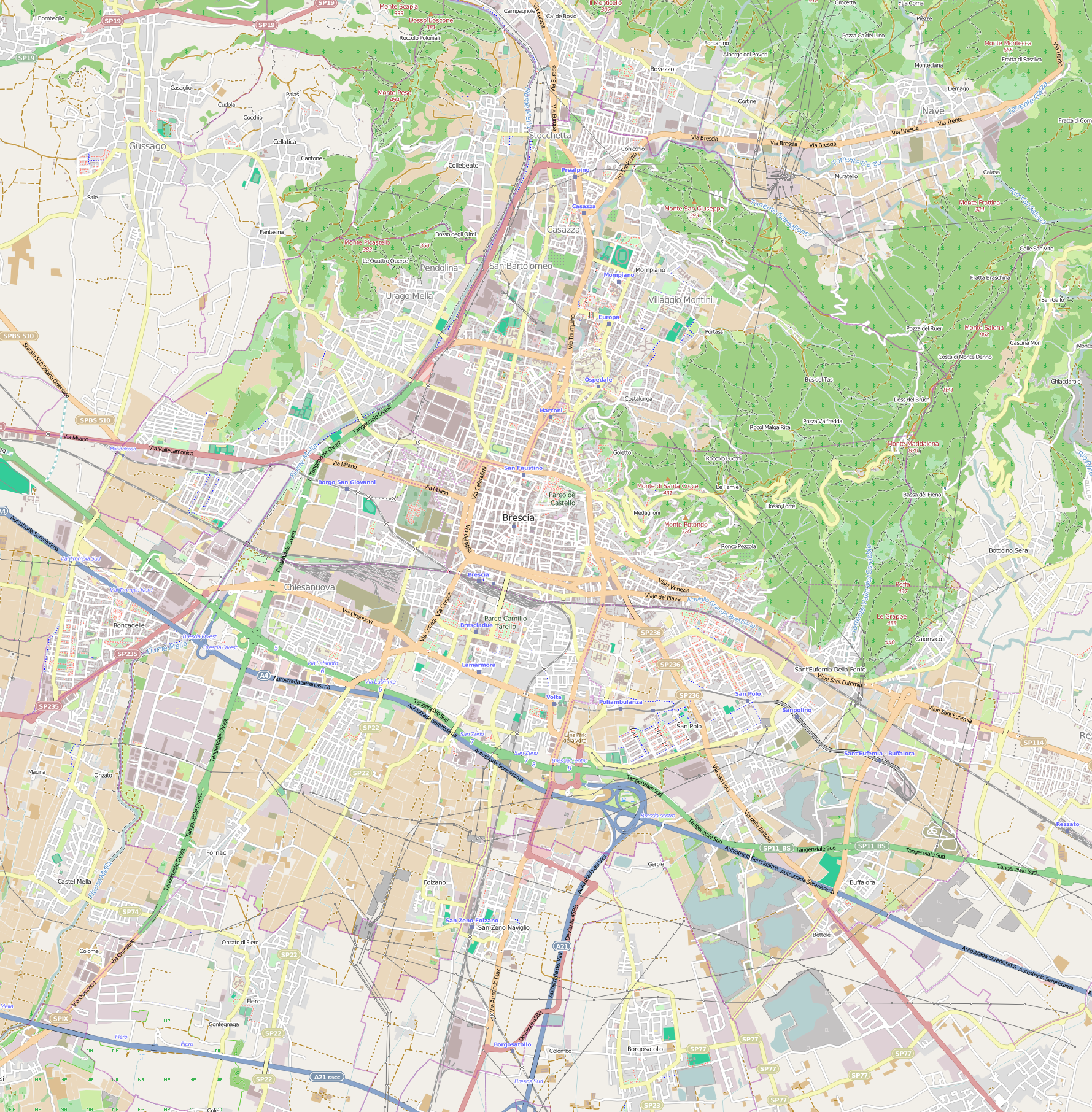
- Location within Brescia

A2A Lamarmora (previously Lamarmora) is a station of the Brescia Metro, in the city of Brescia in northern Italy. The station is located on Via Lamarmora.

Since the February 14, 2023, due to a three-year deal with the multi-utility company A2A, it officially changed name. The original one keeps being valid from a topographical and cadastral point of view.

This large station is designed to be an interchange with a planned 3.5 km line, running westerly from Lamarmora Station to the Fiera Exhibition Ground, through a densely populated part of the city. Nonetheless, the original project of a second metro line connecting to the Fiera Exhibition Ground went scrapped and substituted to a tram line planned to be operative around 2030.

== Connecting buses ==
- 2 – Pendolina – Urago Mella – Volturno – Centro – BS2 – Fiera Chiesanuova
- 13 – Gussago – Cellatica – Torricella – Cantore – Ugoni – Stazione – Corsica – Lamarmora – Poliambulanza
