= San Polo Parco (Brescia Metro) =

Metro station in Brescia, Italy

General information
- Location: San Polo, Brescia; Italy
- Coordinates: 45°31′01″N 10°14′32″E
- Operator: Brescia Mobilità

Construction
- Structure type: underground
- Accessible: Yes

History
- Opened: 2 March 2013

Services
Preceding station	Brescia Metro	Following station
Poliambulanza towards Prealpino	Brescia Metro	San Polo towards Sant'Eufemia
Location

San Polo Parco is a station of the Brescia Metro, in the city of Brescia in northern Italy.

This station is located on the border between the populous district of San Polo and the agricultural area to the north. It can only be reached on foot or by bike and caters primarily to the residential neighbourhood.
