= Europa (Brescia Metro) =

Metro station in Brescia, Italy

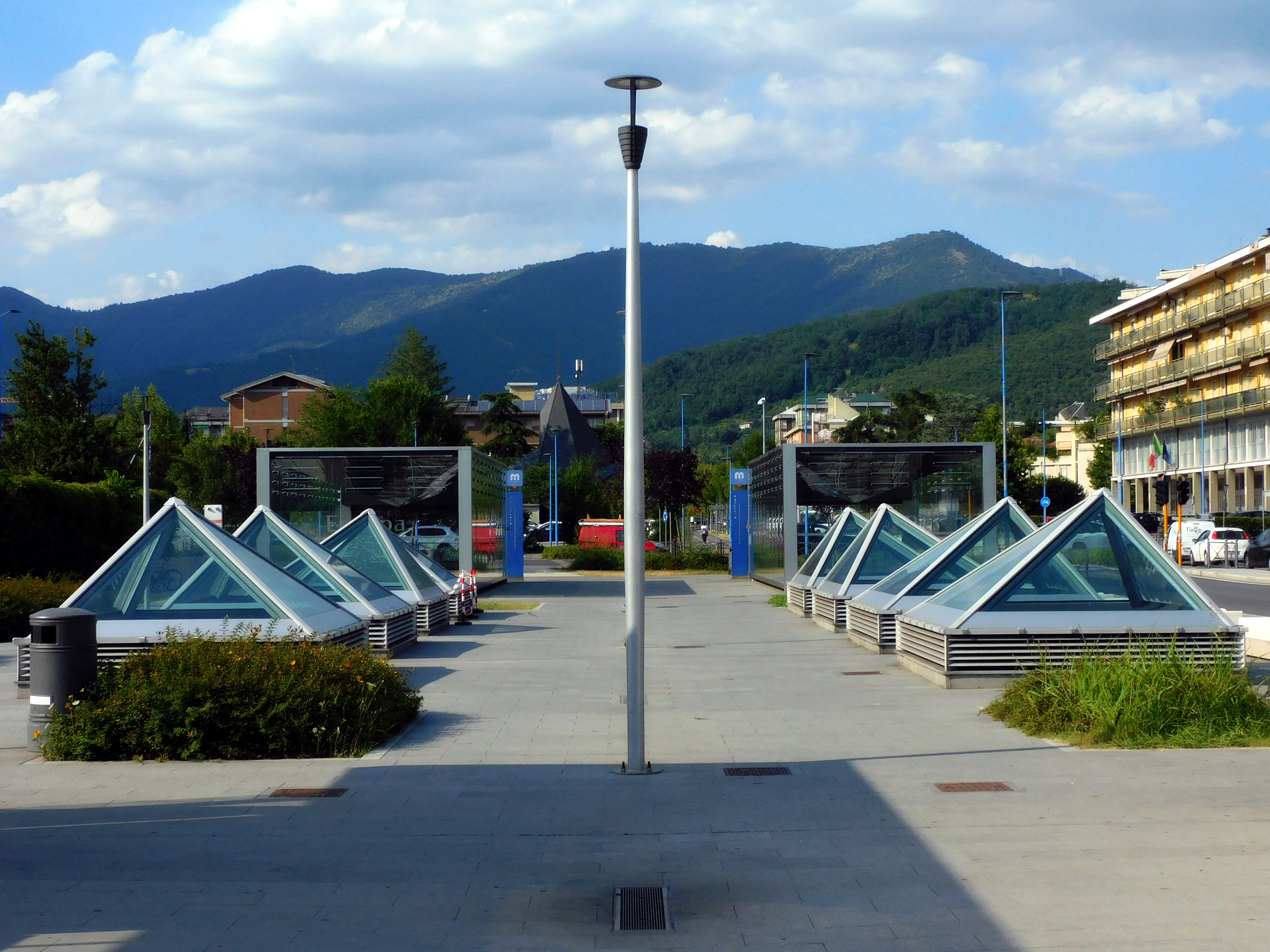

General information
- Location: Viale Europa, Brescia; Italy
- Coordinates: 45°33′46″N 10°14′05″E
- Operator: Brescia Mobilità

Construction
- Structure type: underground
- Accessible: Yes

History
- Opened: 2 March 2013

Services
Preceding station	Brescia Metro	Following station
Mompiano towards Prealpino	Brescia Metro	Ospedale towards Sant'Eufemia
Location

Europa is a station of the Brescia Metro, in the city of Brescia in northern Italy. The station is located on the west side of Viale Europa at Via Branze, near the Faculties of Medicine and Engineering of the University of Brescia.
