= Volta (Brescia Metro) =

Metro station in Brescia, Italy

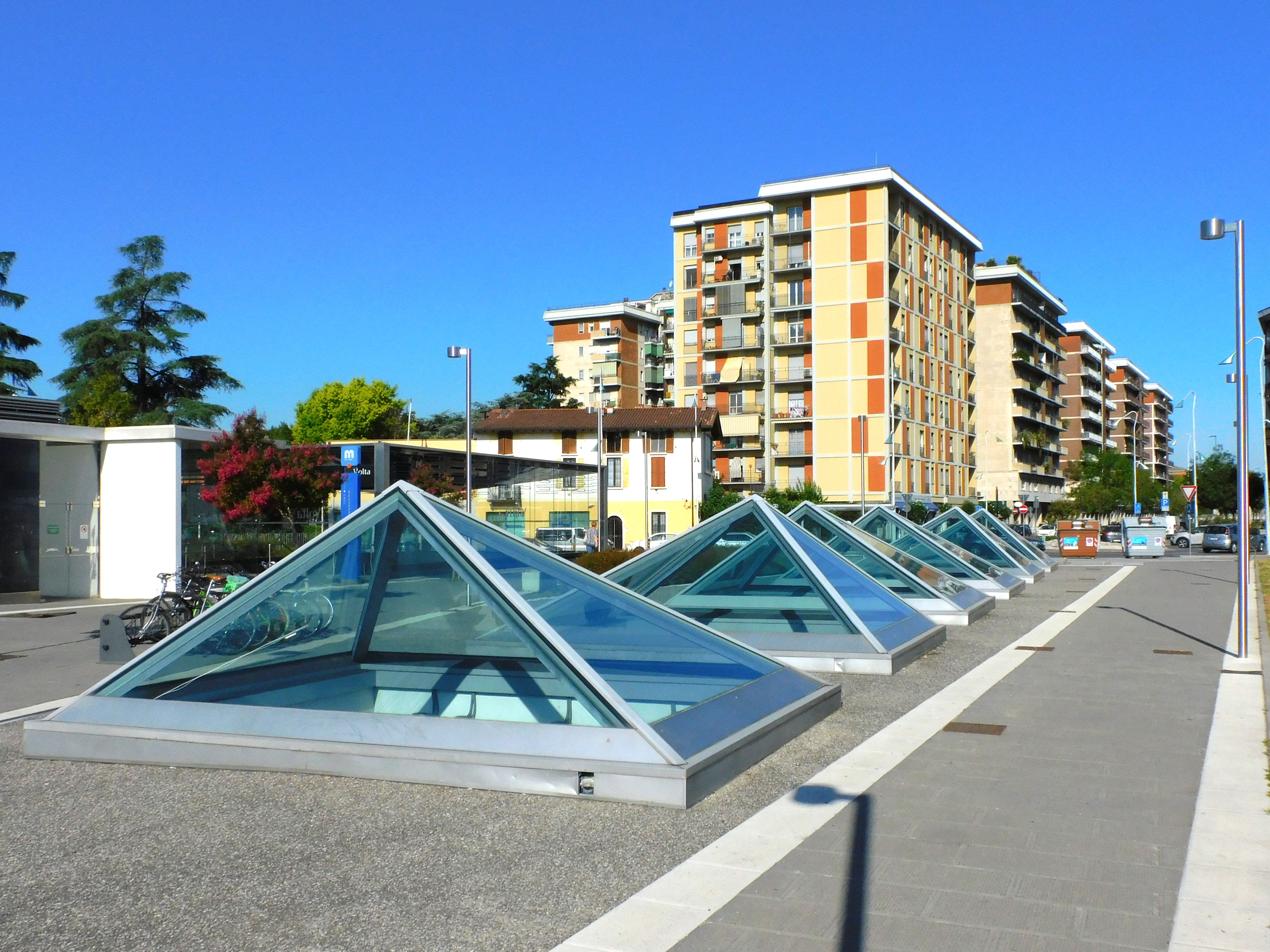

General information
- Location: Via della Volta, Brescia; Italy
- Coordinates: 45°31′04″N 10°13′32″E
- Operator: Brescia Mobilità
- Connections: Bus

Construction
- Structure type: underground
- Accessible: Yes

History
- Opened: 2 March 2013

Services
Preceding station	Brescia Metro	Following station
Lamarmora towards Prealpino	Brescia Metro	Poliambulanza towards Sant'Eufemia
Location
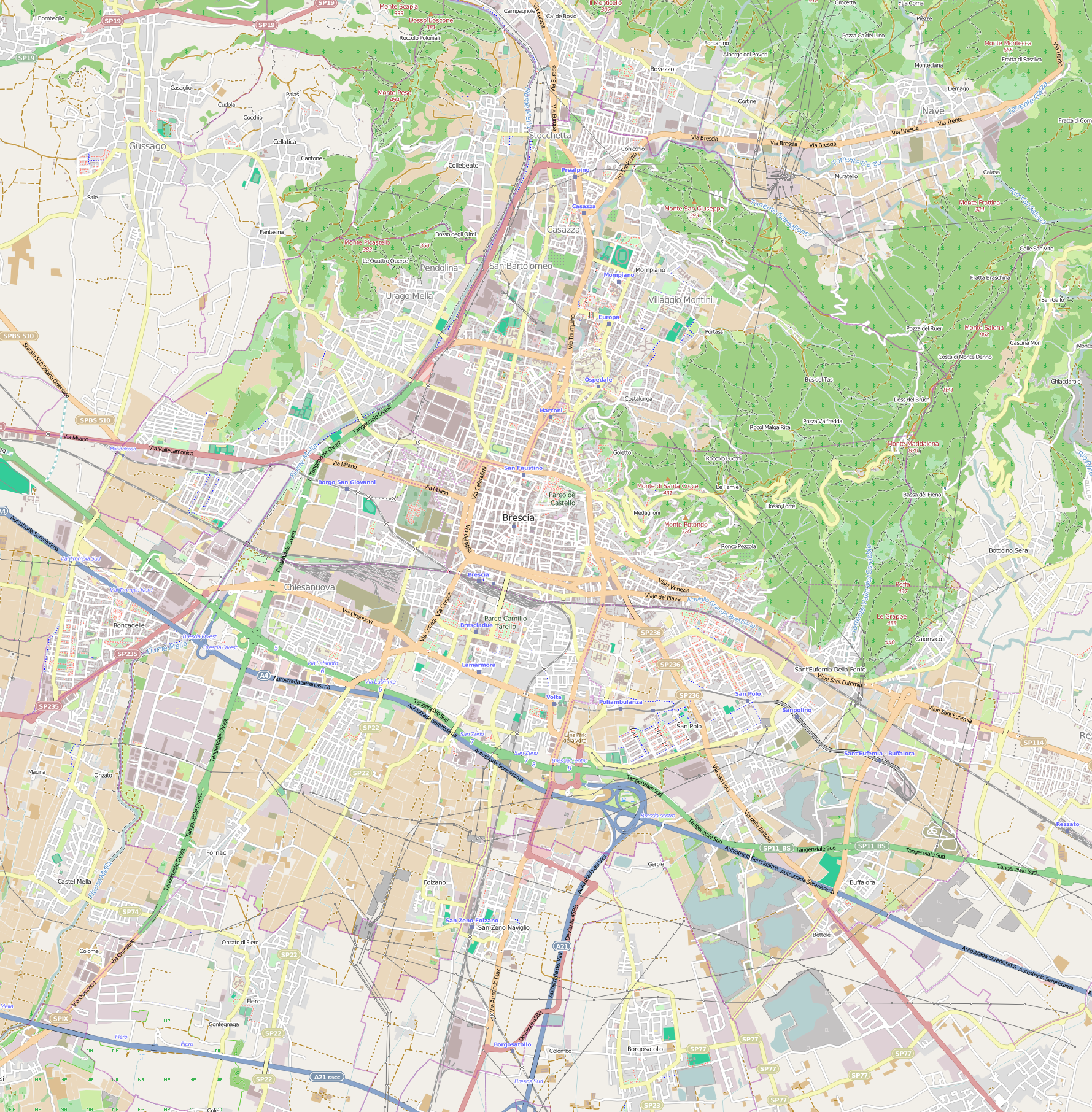
- Location within Brescia

Volta is a station of the Brescia Metro, in the city of Brescia in northern Italy.

The station is located at the junction between Via Lamarmora, Via Cremona and Via della Volta.

== Connecting buses ==
- 2 - Pendolina - Urago Mella - Volturno - Centro - BS2 - Fiera Chiesanuova
- 13 - Gussago - Cellatica - Torricella - Cantore - Ugoni - Stazione - Corsica - Lamarmora - Poliambulanza
