= Marconi (Brescia Metro) =

Metro station in Brescia, Italy

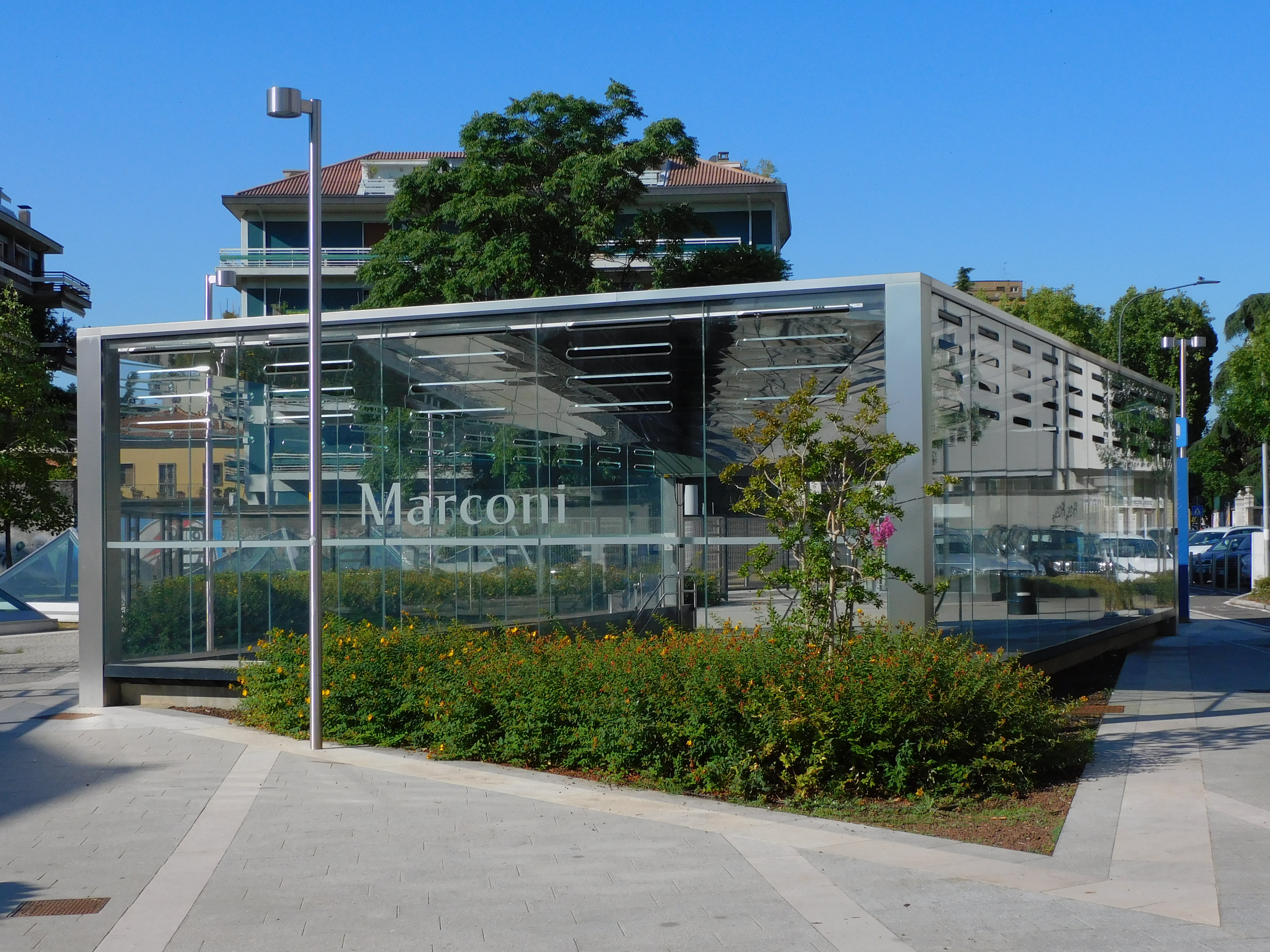

General information
- Location: Via Guglielmo Marconi, Brescia; Italy
- Coordinates: 45°33′06″N 10°13′29″E
- Operator: Brescia Mobilità

Construction
- Structure type: underground
- Accessible: Yes

History
- Opened: 2 March 2013

Services
Preceding station	Brescia Metro	Following station
Ospedale towards Prealpino	Brescia Metro	San Faustino towards Sant'Eufemia
Location

Marconi is a station of the Brescia Metro, in the city of Brescia in northern Italy.

This ultra-modern station was built under the western end of Parco Marconi. The above ground structure brings a touch of the future into a twentieth-century park and skylight pyramids protrude from the lawn.
