= San Faustino (Brescia Metro) =

Metro station in Brescia, Italy

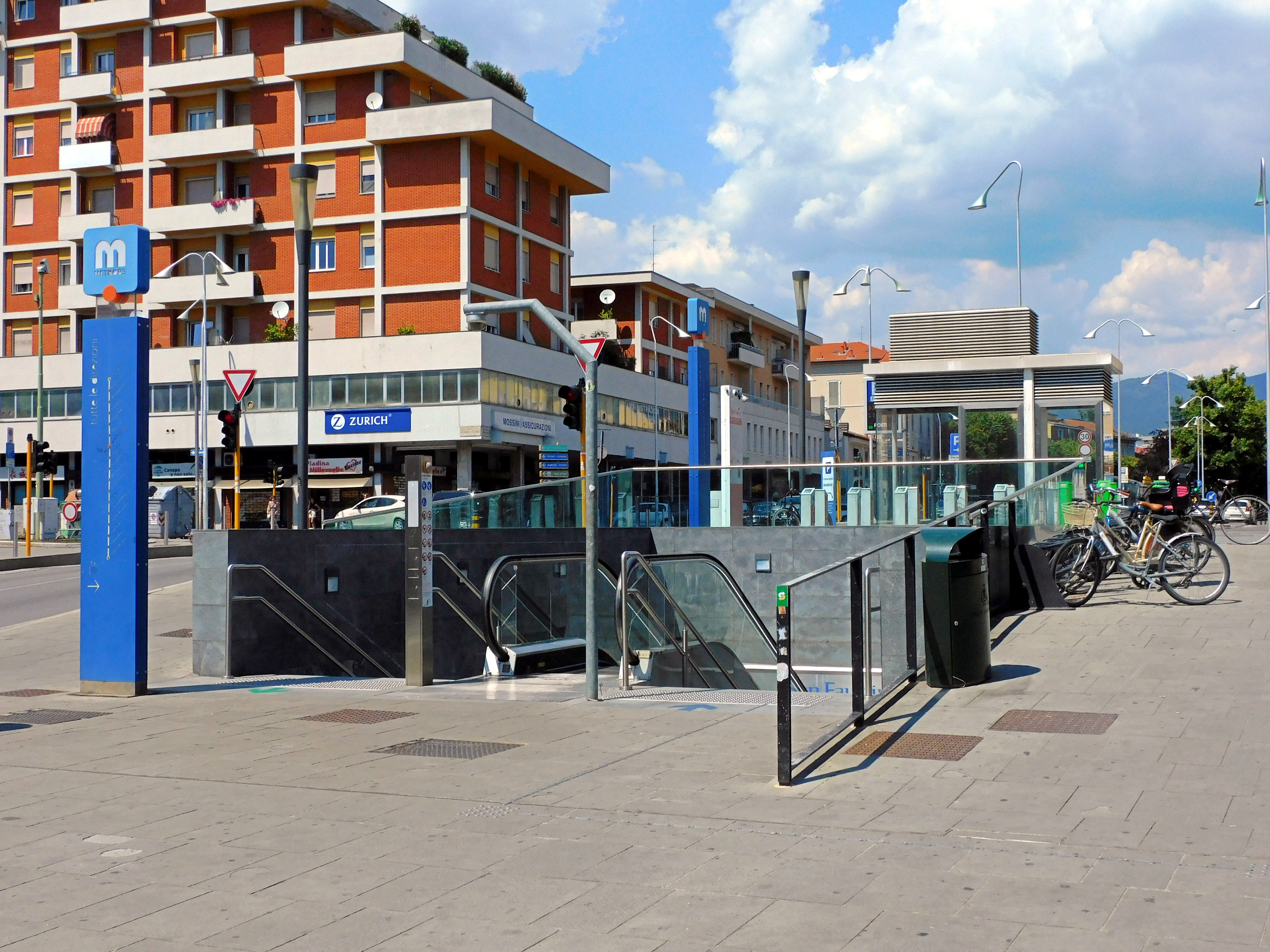
- Entrance of San Faustino Metro station

General information
- Location: Via San Faustino, Brescia; Italy
- Coordinates: 45°32′42″N 10°13′13″E
- Operator: Brescia Mobilità

Construction
- Structure type: underground
- Accessible: Yes

History
- Opened: 2 March 2013

Services
Preceding station	Brescia Metro	Following station
Marconi towards Prealpino	Brescia Metro	Vittoria towards Sant'Eufemia
Location

San Faustino is a station of the Brescia Metro, in the city of Brescia in northern Italy.

San Faustino is the first of two stations in the city centre for those arriving from the north. Being close to the University of Brescia, it is expected to be widely used by students. The discovery of the ruins of Venetian walls caused a slowdown of construction work in the area and reconsideration of the original station concept. Major design changes to the structure of the station resulted in the remains of the ancient walls being visible through a glass floor, however there are none of the typical pyramid skylights to bring daylight to the train platforms.
