= Sanpolino (Brescia Metro) =

Metro station in Brescia, Italy

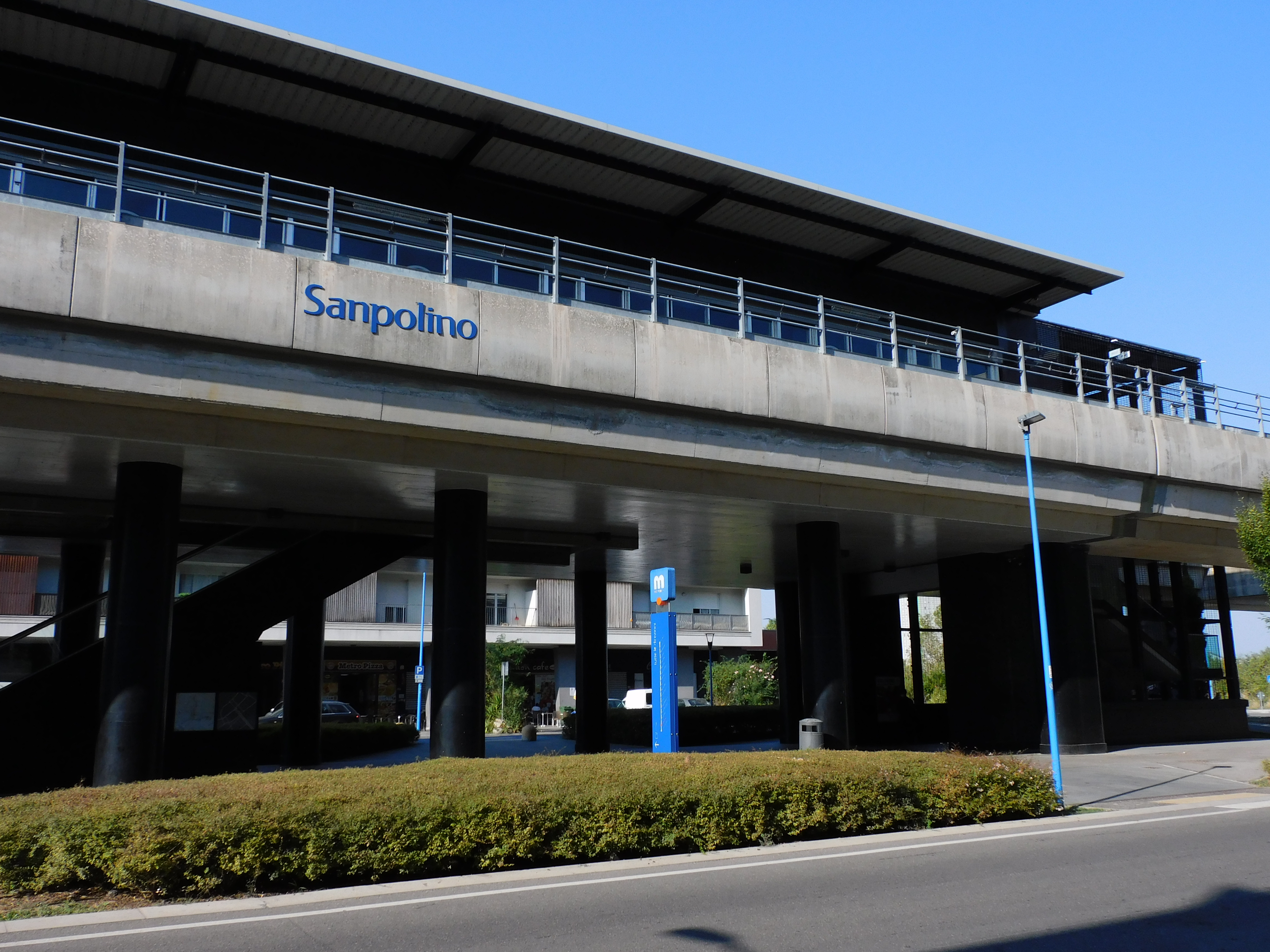

General information
- Location: Corso Bazoli, Brescia; Italy
- Coordinates: 45°30′59″N 10°15′59″E
- Operator: Brescia Mobilità
- Connections: Bus

Construction
- Structure type: elevated
- Parking: 1,400
- Accessible: Yes

History
- Opened: 2 March 2013

Services
Preceding station	Brescia Metro	Following station
San Polo towards Prealpino	Brescia Metro	Sant'Eufemia Terminus
Location

Sanpolino is a station of the Brescia Metro, in the city of Brescia in northern Italy. The station is located in the centre of Sanpolino, a densely populated modern and innovative suburb of Brescia.

The site of the station has affected the entire surrounding area by the construction of large concrete pillars to support the elevated metro line, and requiring reorganization of the road network. Under the overhead structure of the tracks and the station there are two long rows of car parking, totaling approximately 1,400 spaces, intended to attract passengers from the nearby communities of Sant'Eufemia della Fonte and Buffalora.

== Connecting buses ==
- 9 - Violino - Badia - Milano - Centro - Foro Boario - S.Polo Case - Sanpolino - Buffalora
- 16 - Onzato - Roncadelle - Violino - Urago Mella - Oberdan - Venezia - Piave - Duca Abruzzi - Giorgione - Sanpolino
