= Casazza (Brescia Metro) =

Metro station in Brescia, Italy

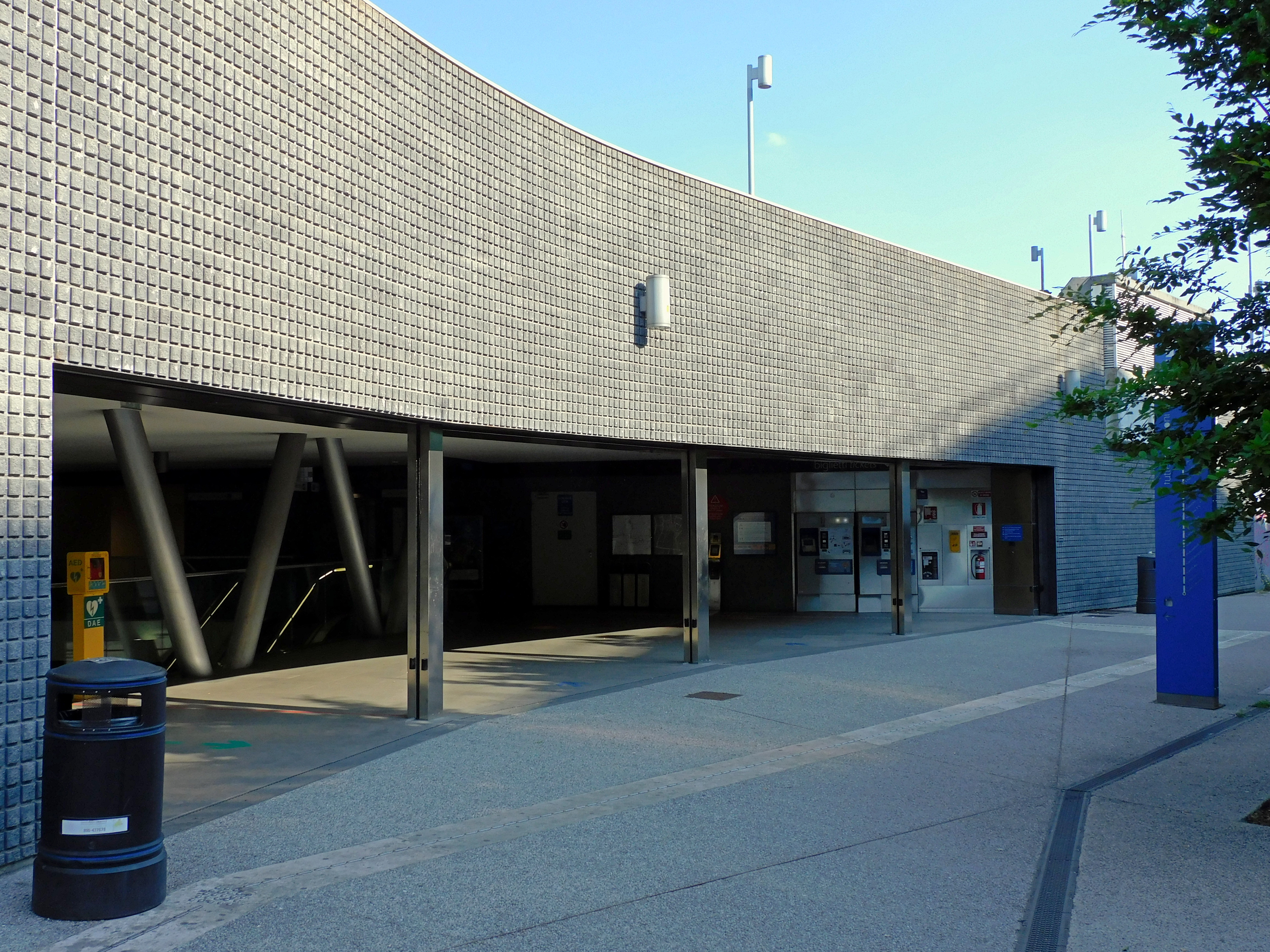

General information
- Location: Via Triumplina, Brescia; Italy
- Coordinates: 45°34′32″N 10°13′49″E
- Operator: Brescia Mobilità

Construction
- Structure type: underground
- Accessible: Yes

History
- Opened: 2 March 2013

Services
Preceding station	Brescia Metro	Following station
Prealpino Terminus	Brescia Metro	Mompiano towards Sant'Eufemia
Location

Casazza is a station of the Brescia Metro, in the city of Brescia in northern Italy. The station is located beside Centro Futura, a large mixed-use development, on the west side of Via Triumplina at the intersection with Via Conicchio. Construction of the station by cut and cover required the complete rehabilitation of Via Triumplina, with five triangular skylights on the surface being the only outward sign of a much more complex underground structure.
