= Sant'Eufemia Buffalora (Brescia Metro) =

Metro station in Brescia, Italy

Sant’Eufemia Buffalora
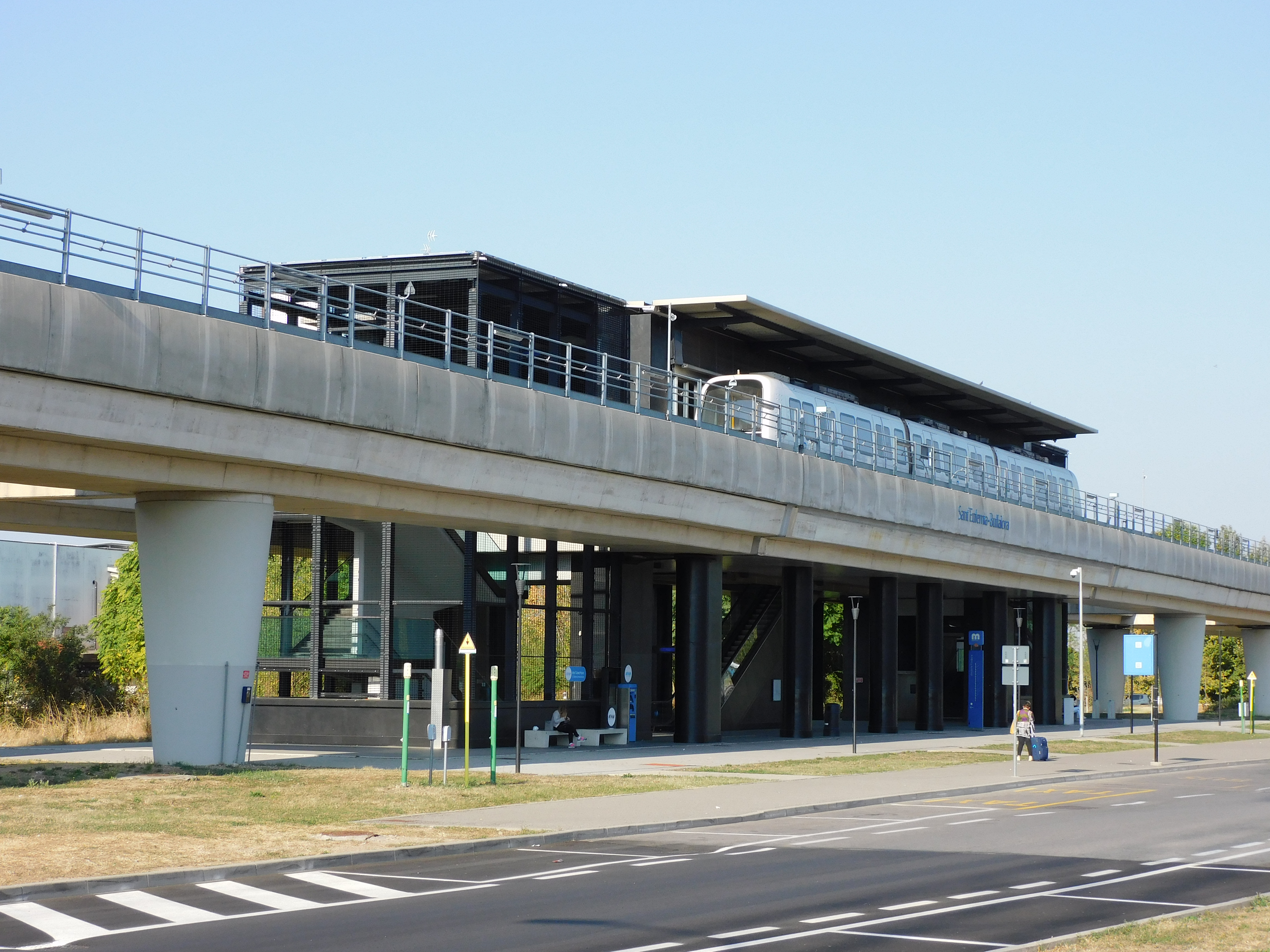

General information
- Location: Via Agostino Chiappa, Brescia; Italy
- Coordinates: 45°30′41″N 10°16′48″E
- Operator: Brescia Mobilità

Construction
- Structure type: elevated
- Accessible: Yes

History
- Opened: 2 March 2013

Services
Preceding station	Brescia Metro	Following station
Sanpolino towards Prealpino	Brescia Metro	Terminus
Location
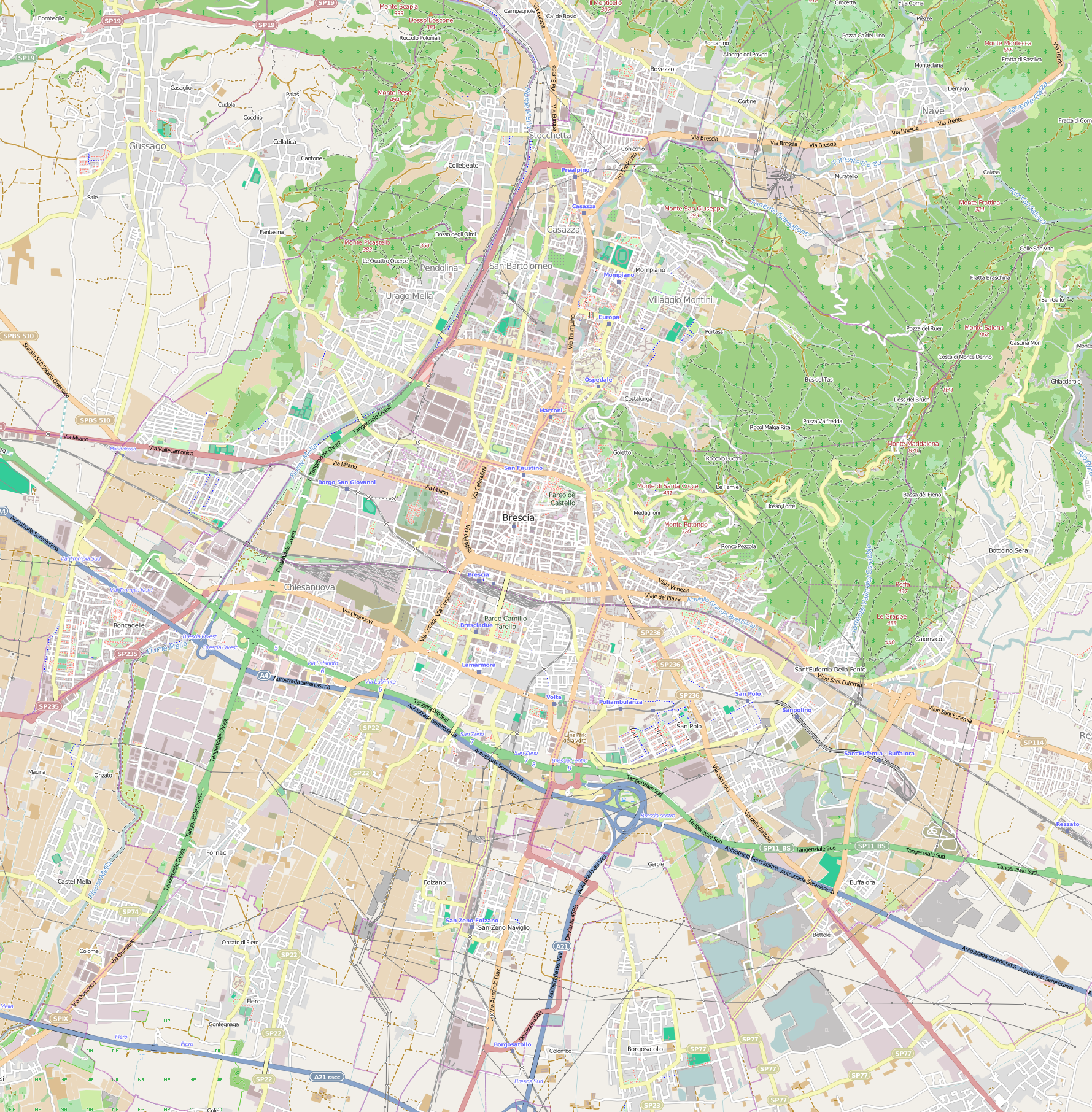
- Location within Brescia

Sant’Eufemia Buffalora is a station of the Brescia Metro, in the city of Brescia in northern Italy. Originally named "Sant'Eufemia", the addition of "Buffalora" more closely reflects the location of the station.

As the easterly terminus of the metro line, the station serves not only the nearby towns of Sant'Eufemia della Fonte and Buffalora, but also Rezzato and more distant traffic coming from Montichiari and Gavardo and communities near Lake Garda. For this reason, it is planned to build a large parking-lot near the station.
