= Prealpino (Brescia Metro) =

Metro station in Brescia, Italy

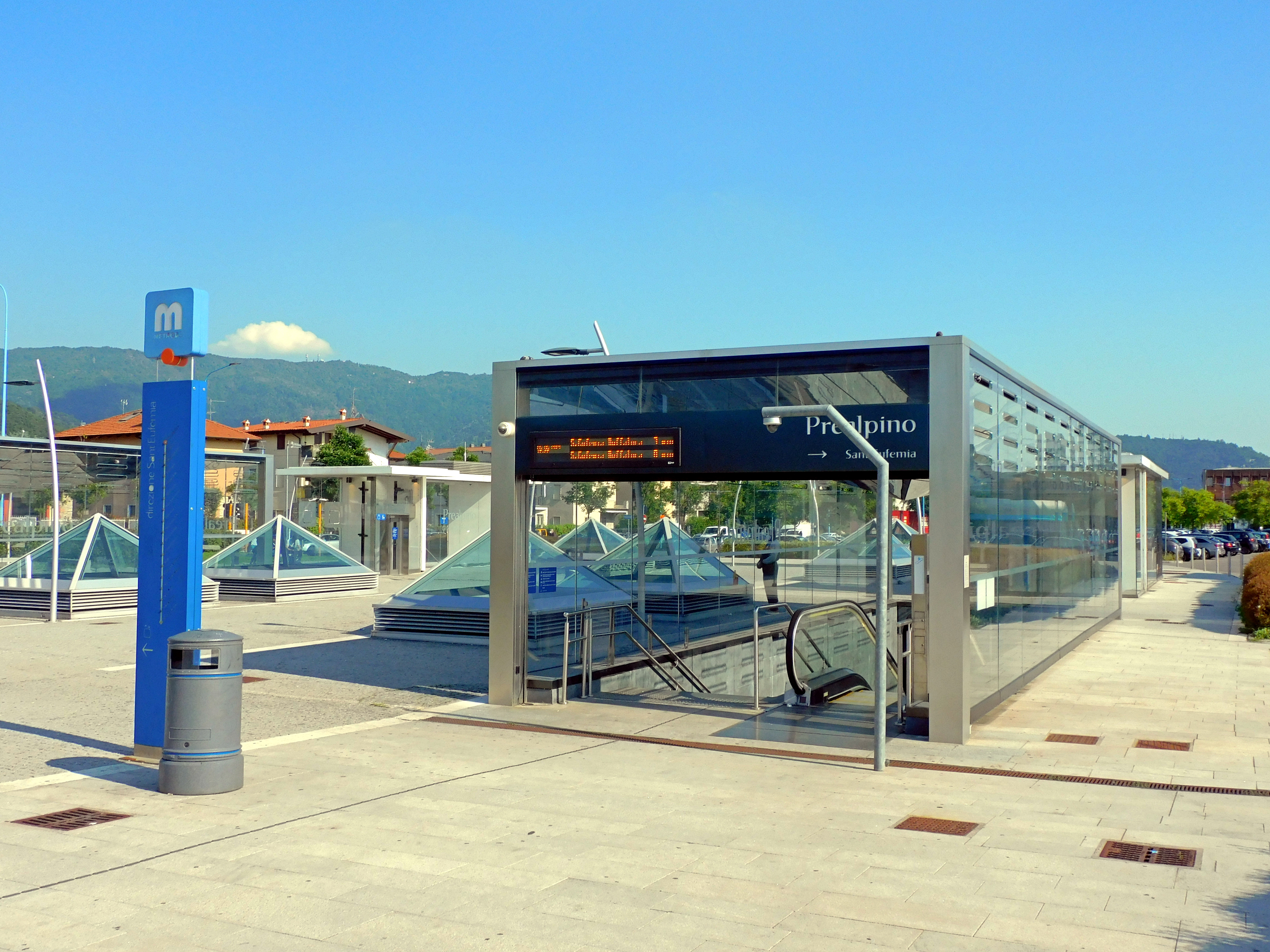

General information
- Location: Via Triumplina at Via dell'Arsenale, Brescia; Italy
- Coordinates: 45°34′48″N 10°13′45″E
- Operator: Brescia Mobilità

Construction
- Structure type: underground
- Cycle facilities: 488
- Accessible: Yes

History
- Opened: 2 March 2013

Services
| Preceding station | Brescia Metro | Following station |
|---|---|---|
| Terminus | Brescia Metro | Casazza towards Sant'Eufemia |
Location
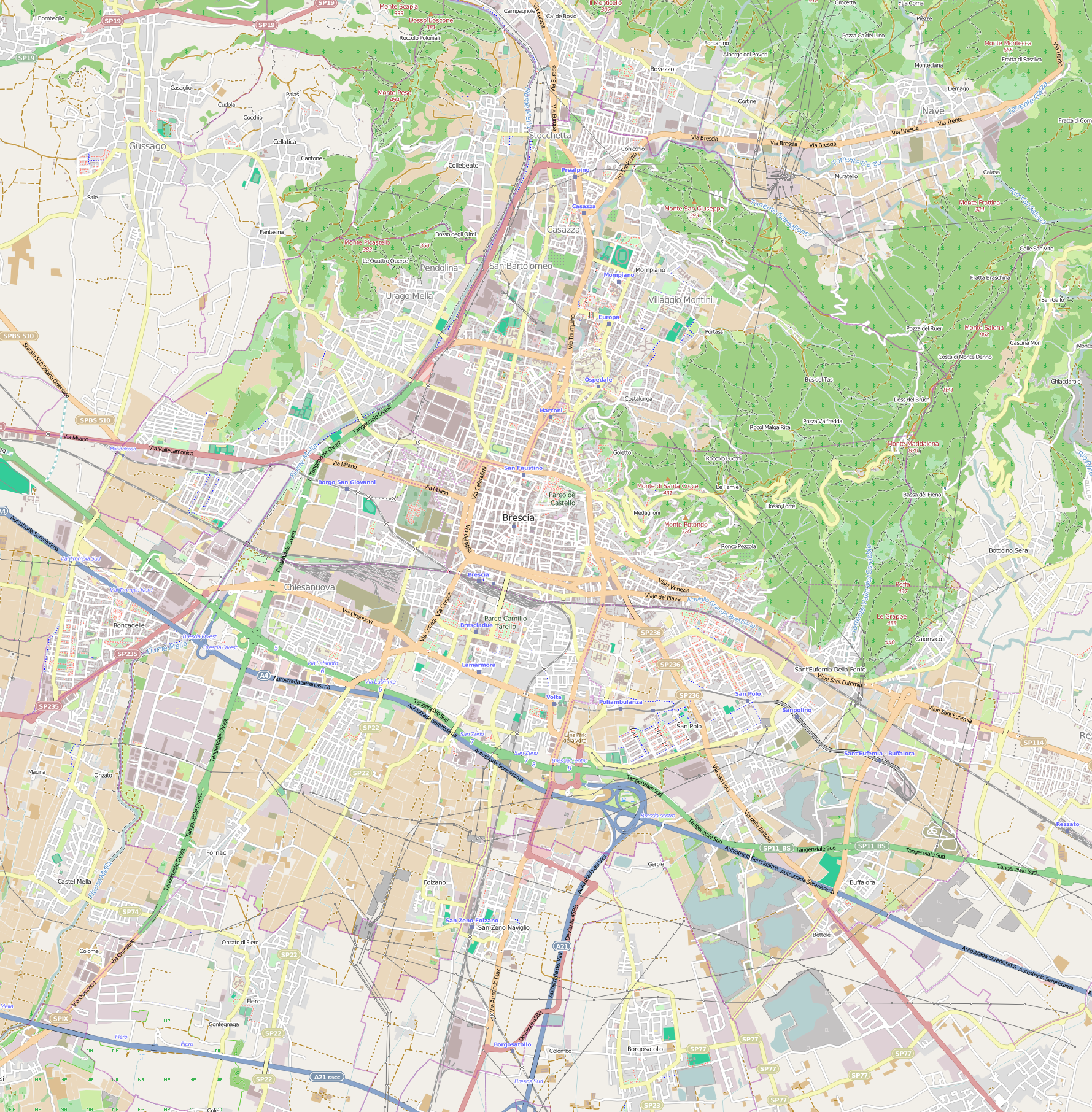
- Location within Brescia

Prealpino is a station of the Brescia Metro, in the city of Brescia in northern Italy. The underground station is the northern terminus of the line.

Although there was an official ribbon cutting ceremony at the station on 2 February 2013, the line did not become operational until 2 March 2013.
