= Brescia Metro =

Metro in Brescia, Italy

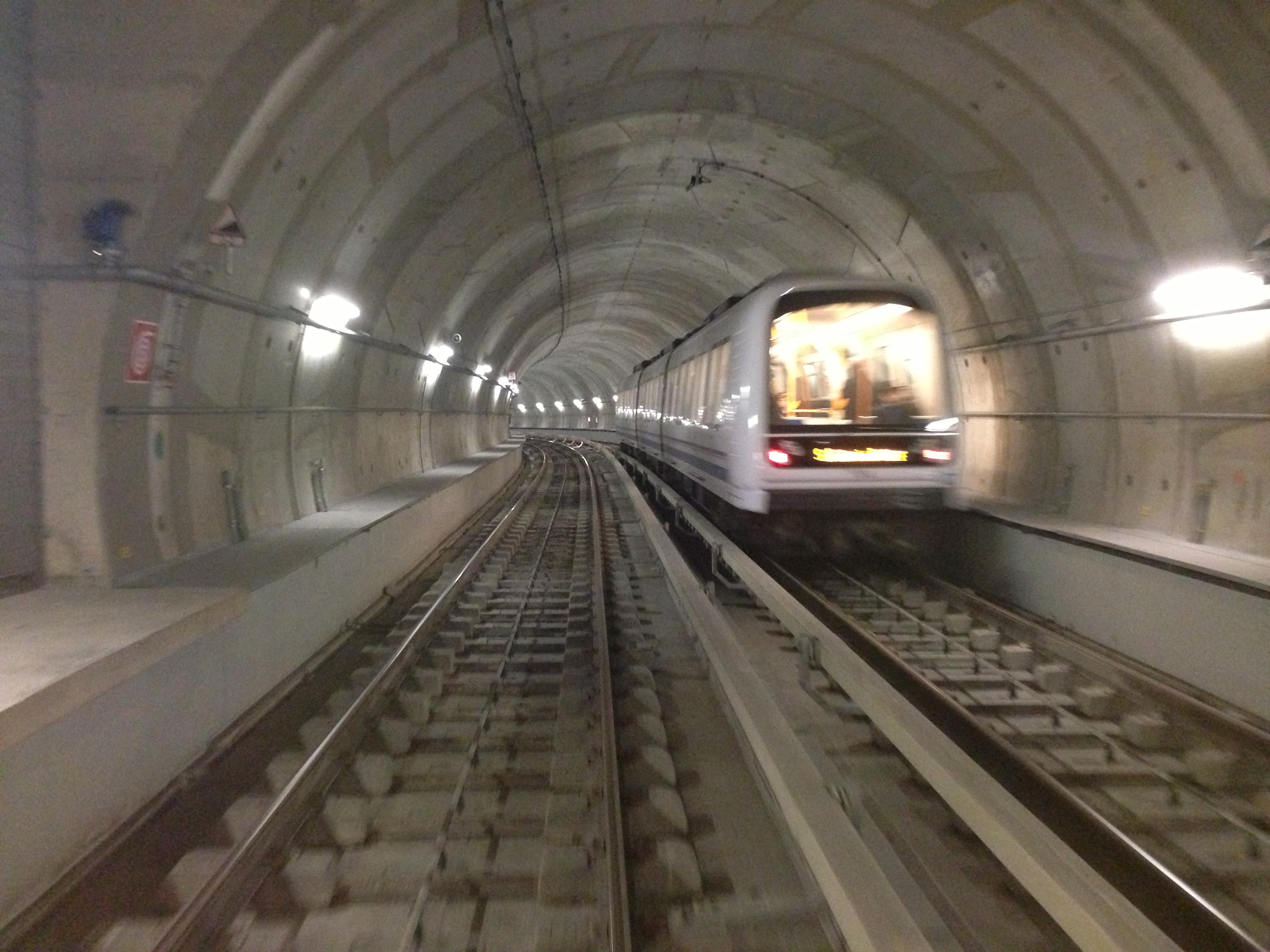

Overview
- Native name: Metropolitana di Brescia
- Locale: Brescia, Lombardy, Italy
- Transit type: Rapid transit
- Number of lines: 1
- Number of stations: 17
- Daily ridership: 46,695 (2023)
- Annual ridership: 17,043,542 (2023)
- Website: Brescia Mobilità

Operation
- Began operation: 2 March 2013; 13 years ago
- Operator: Brescia Mobilità S.p.A.
- Number of vehicles: 18 AnsaldoBreda Driverless Metro
- Train length: 3 cars
- Headway: 4–10 minutes

Technical
- System length: 13.7 km (8.5 mi)
- Track gauge: 1,435 mm (4 ft 8 1/2 in) standard gauge
- Top speed: 80 km/h (50 mph)
System map

The Brescia Metro (Italian: Metropolitana di Brescia) is a driverless rapid transit network serving Brescia, Lombardy, Italy. The network consists of a single line, having a length of 13.7 kilometres (8.5 mi) and a total of 17 stations from Prealpino to Sant’Eufemia-Buffalora, located respectively at the north and southeast of Brescia.

During the 1980s, road congestion in the vicinity of Brescia rose dramatically, resulting in the City Council becoming interested in the adoption of a new mass transit platform to provide an alternative means of access around the city. Following studies of several mass transit systems, it was decided that the development of a light metro would be the most suitable option. During this time, several other European cities had introduced their own automated light metro networks, which likely provided a model for Brescia's transport planners. While efforts were made during the 1990s to secure funding and attempt to launch the project, the tendering process for the construction of the first section of the Metro was initiated in 2000. In April 2003, a €575 million contract was awarded to a consortium led by Ansaldo STS, which included AnsaldoBreda, Astaldi and Acciona, who proposed to implement a system bearing considerable similarities to the Copenhagen Metro.

In January 2004, construction work on the project commenced. However, progress was hindered by the discovery of several sites of archaeological importance, leading to redesign efforts to minimise the network's infringement on such historical locations. While delayed, on 2 March 2013, the first line of the Brescia Metro was officially opened to regular services. This first railway line has been viewed as simply being the starting point for the subsequent construction of an ambitious and large metro network spanning across the city and into its suburbs; multiple plans for its expansion have been proposed. The existing Metro is operated using a fleet of 18 three-carriage trainsets, which run entirely under driverless operation along the route from a centralised control centre, while all of the 17 stations on the Metro network feature platform edge doors.

== History ==
=== Construction ===
The impetus for the establishment of a metro in the Brescia region has its origin during the 1980s, which was around the same time in which the first fully automatic light metro systems were being introduced at various other mid-size cities in Europe. In 1986, the City Council of Brescia was openly considering options for improving the city's transportation system in response to the rapid rise of road congestion in the region, which had in turn been generated with the increasing popularity of private motor vehicles amongst the populace. A pair of feasibility studies were commissioned during the following year; the introduction of various alternative transport systems, including the use of light rail, a metro system, and trolley buses, were thoroughly examined from both technical and commercial viewpoints. Eventually, these studies determined that the adoption of an automated light metro system was as the optimum technology to meet the city's requirements.

In 1989, the first public tender for the establishment of such a system was announced. However, this project was ultimately cancelled in 1996. In 1994, the first application for public financing for the project was issued. Public financing from the central government was first issued during the following year, while other funds were made available in 2002 from the regional government. In 2000, the tendering process for the construction of the automated metro was initiated by the city authorities. During that same year, it was publicly announced that bids, including those from international vendors, were being accepted for the first phase of the project.

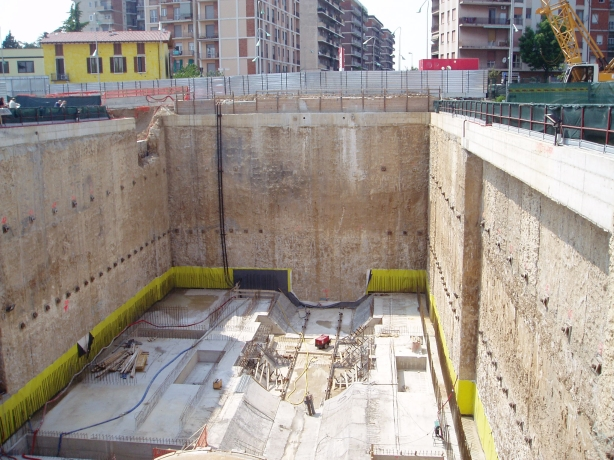
The site of Volta station in May 2006.

In April 2003, a €575 million contract was awarded to a consortium led by Ansaldo STS, which included AnsaldoBreda, Astaldi and Acciona, who proposed to implement a system that would be largely similar to the Copenhagen Metro. Under this arrangement, Ansaldo STS acted as the prime contactor for the metro's construction, being primarily responsible for matters pertaining to the power supply and automatic train control systems, as well as for the supply of various other subsystems such as supervisory control and data acquisition (SCADA) and telecommunication equipment. Of the other partners, Astaldi supervised the execution of the project's civil engineering, including the installation of electrical and mechanical systems, while AnsaldoBreda manufactured the rolling stock. Various information, planning, and other operational systems were supplied by IVU Traffic Technologies.

In January 2004, construction work on the project commenced. However, following a series of archaeological discoveries, the majority of which having been found in the vicinity of the S.Faustino and Vittoria stations, some delays were encountered. Eventually, some aspects of the construction programme were redesigned, including some of the intended stations for the network, in order to reduce its exposure to the historically sensitive areas; consequently, the start of the metro services was eventually set back towards 2013. On 2 March 2013, the first line was officially opened.

=== Future ===
The first railway line of Brescia Metro has been viewed as being only a starting point for the eventual construction of much more extensive metro network, which is to cover large sections of the city as well as spreading into its developing suburban areas on the outskirts. Reportedly, plans have been mooted for the construction of a 3.5 km (2.2 mi) line that would run between Lamarmora Station and the Fiera Exhibition Ground, traversing through a densely populated part of the city in the process. Additionally, it has been proposed to establish a metro line running between Prealpino and Inzino, which would pass through the Trompia Valley.

== Operations ==
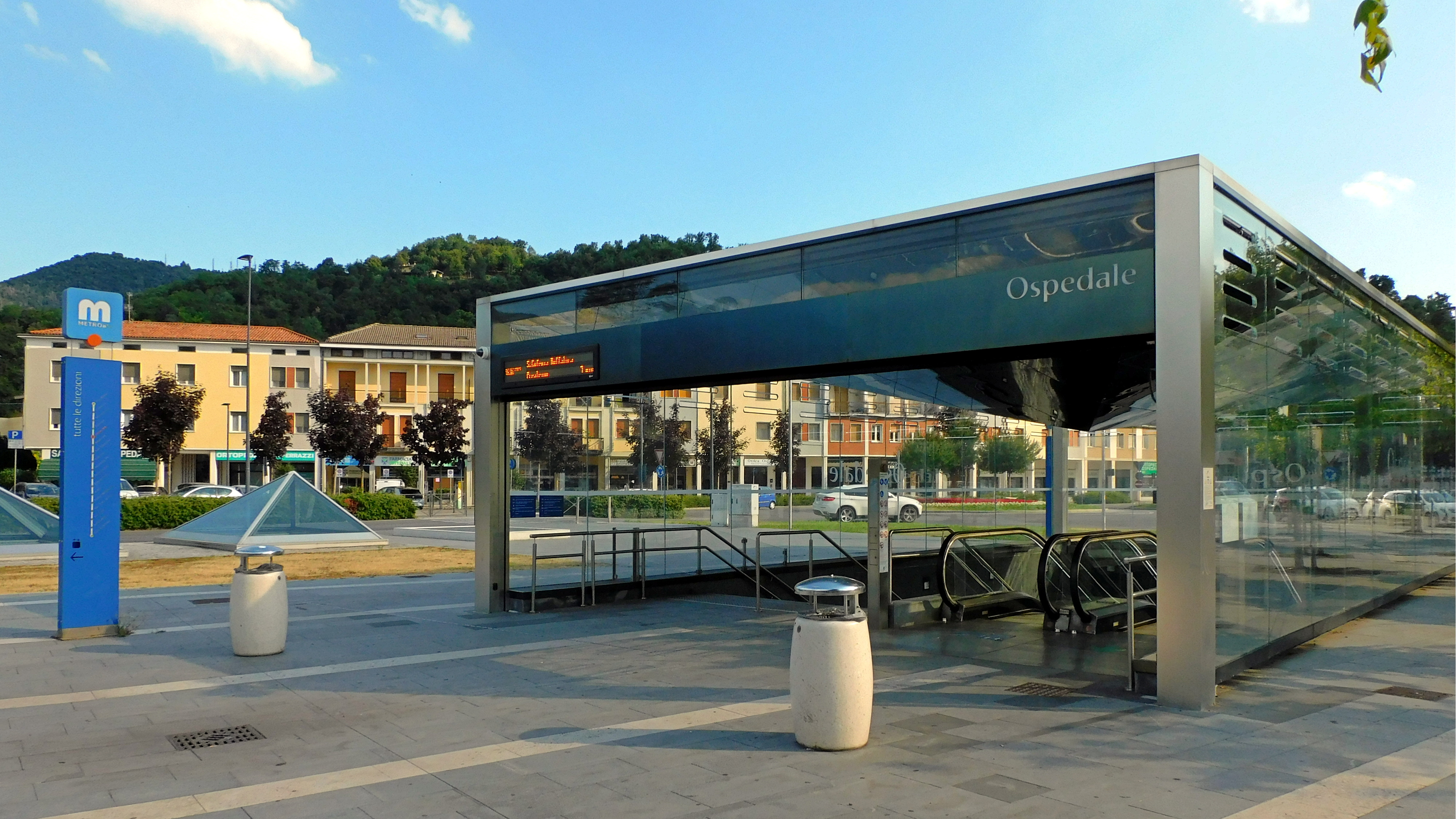
Ospedale station entrance.

The Brescia Metro is a driverless system. Instead of placing individual drivers into the cabs of each train for its operation, all vehicles are instead actively and continuously managed from a centralised control centre, which is capable of monitoring the movements of traffic across any part of the network. To help facilitate and regulate punctual services, the number of trains in active service can be rapidly altered, a decision which is largely dependent upon changes in the number of passengers using the network at a given movement. By using a high degree of automation, staff are freed up to instead focus on passenger assistance without neglecting to maintain a high level of safety awareness.

As of 2013, the Brescia Metro network has been provisioned with a total of 17 stations. Of these, eight of them have been built within relatively deep tunnels, while five have been established in shallower tunnels, running just beneath surface level. Two of the stations are located at ground level, and the final pair of stations are in elevated positions set upon viaducts. These stations are located relatively close together as the metro is intended to be used for local traffic only. All stations have been outfitted with automated doors along their platform edges. This is to act as a safeguard against passengers entering onto the track, accidentally or otherwise, while also increasing passenger comfort by reducing their exposure to wind and noise from train movements through the stations.

Each day, services on the Brescia Metro starts at 5:00, while the last train departs at 24:00. Throughout the day, train frequencies can vary from 10 minutes (off peak) to 4 minutes (weekdays peak hours). Since the launch of services during 2013, operations have been gradually extended over time. Reportedly, the maximum achievable ridership of the present system is believed to be 8,500 passengers per hour in either direction, during which trains would be operated with a headway of as little as 180 seconds.

== Rolling stock ==
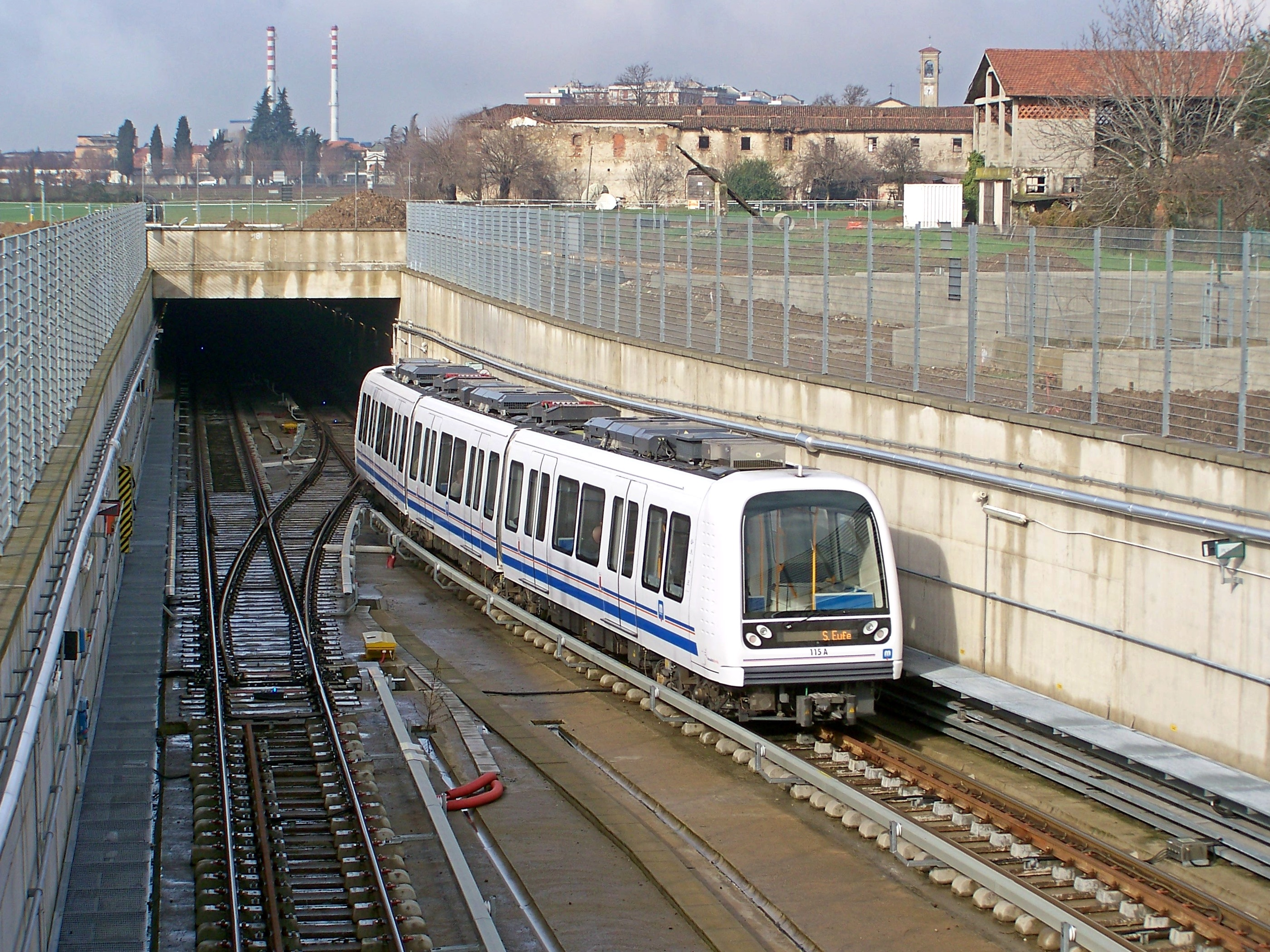
AnsaldoBreda train for the Brescia Metro.

The AnsaldoBreda Driverless Metro trains are identical to those deployed on the older Copenhagen Metro. As the name implies, they are automatically operated and do not normally require the presence of any personnel in the cab to drive the train. However, each train is furnished with a driving panel to enable its manual operation if this function were required; it is intended to be used only during emergency situations however.

A total of 18 vehicles (classified "Series 100") have entered into service on the network. Each trainset is composed of three carriages, having a combined length of 39 meters and a total capacity of 300 passengers. The traction system uses an arrangement of six electric motors attached to the trains. The vehicles have been designed for a maximum achievable speed of 80 km/h (50 mph).

All of the fleet is maintained at a single purpose-built depot located in the S. Eufemia Buffalora area. This depot is provisioned with specialised buildings for train storage, in-depth maintenance and repairs, component storage, automated cleaning, and routine vehicle servicing.

== Gallery ==
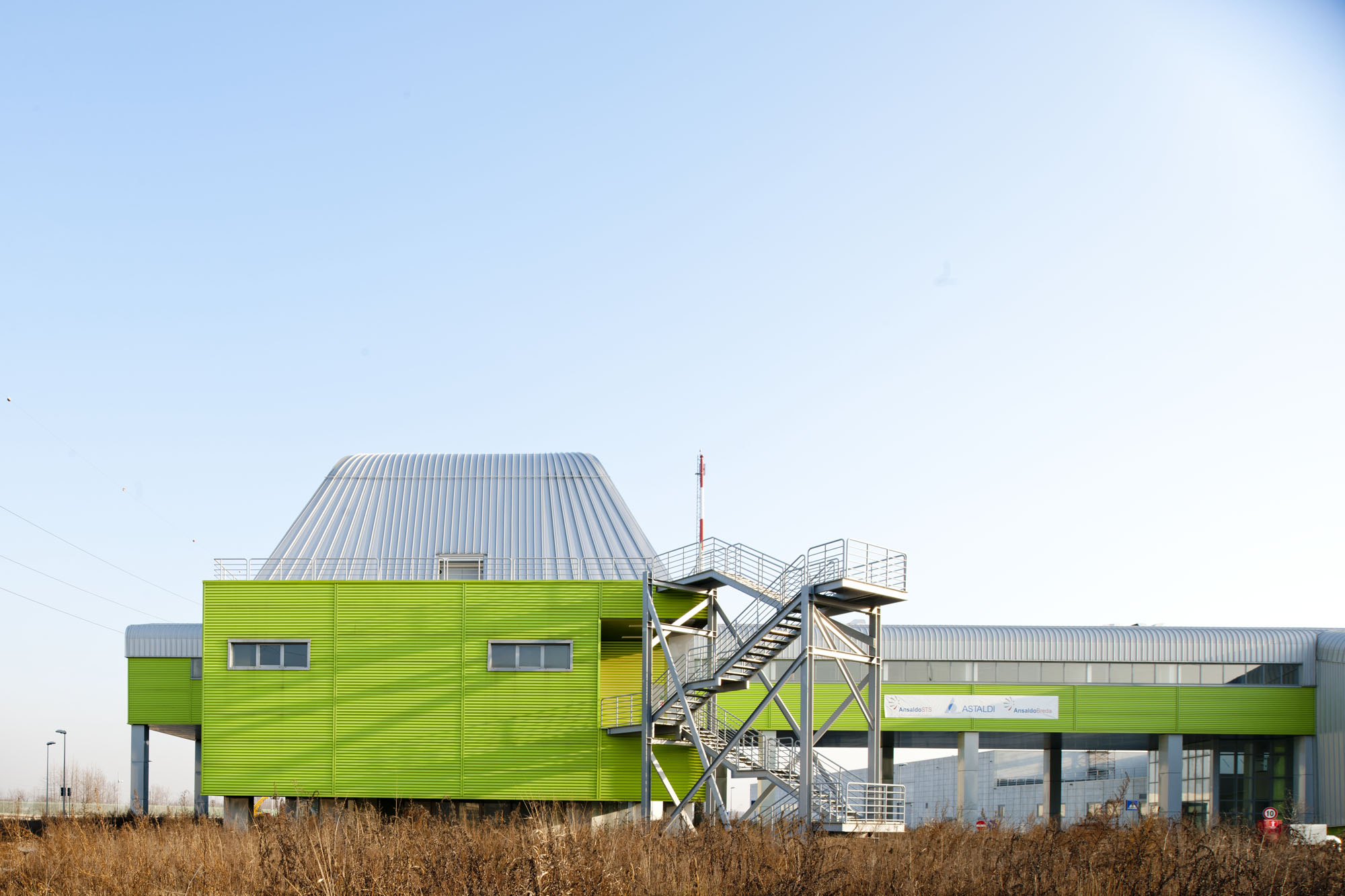
Metro depot in Sant'Eufemia

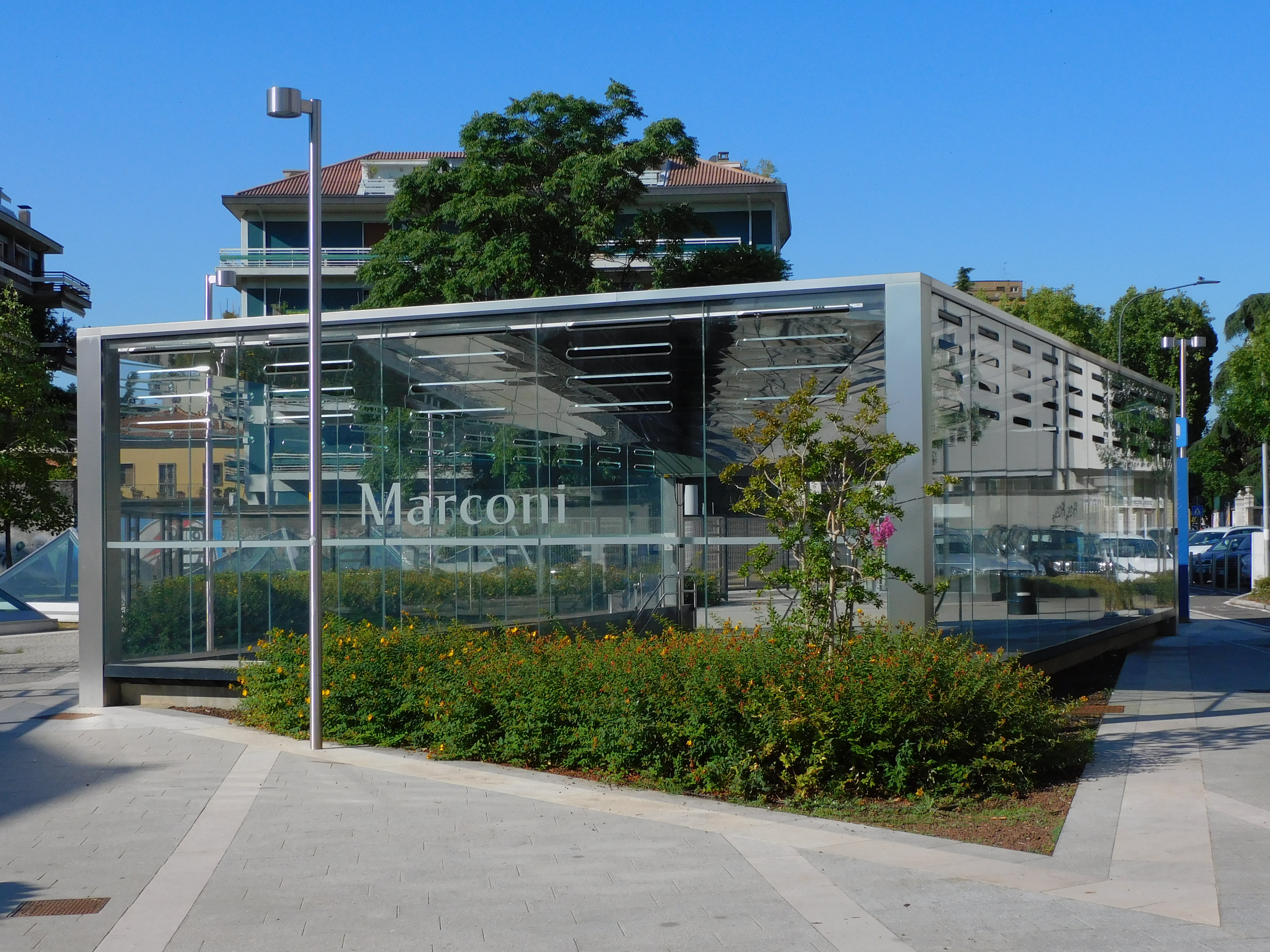
Marconi station

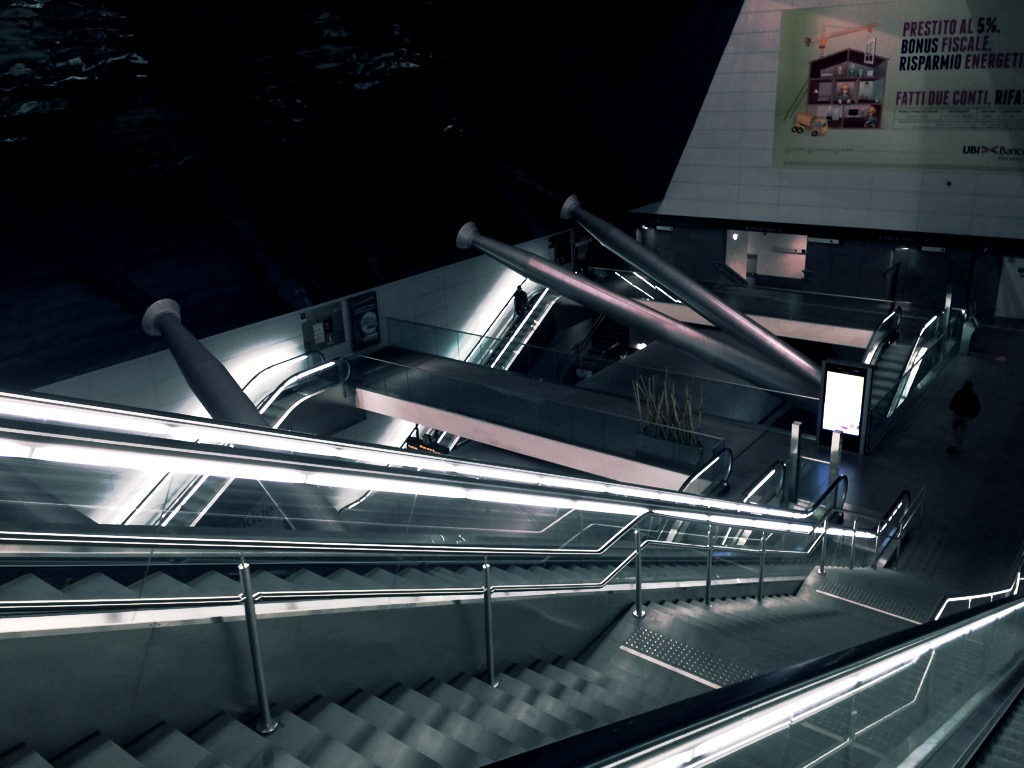
Bresciadue station

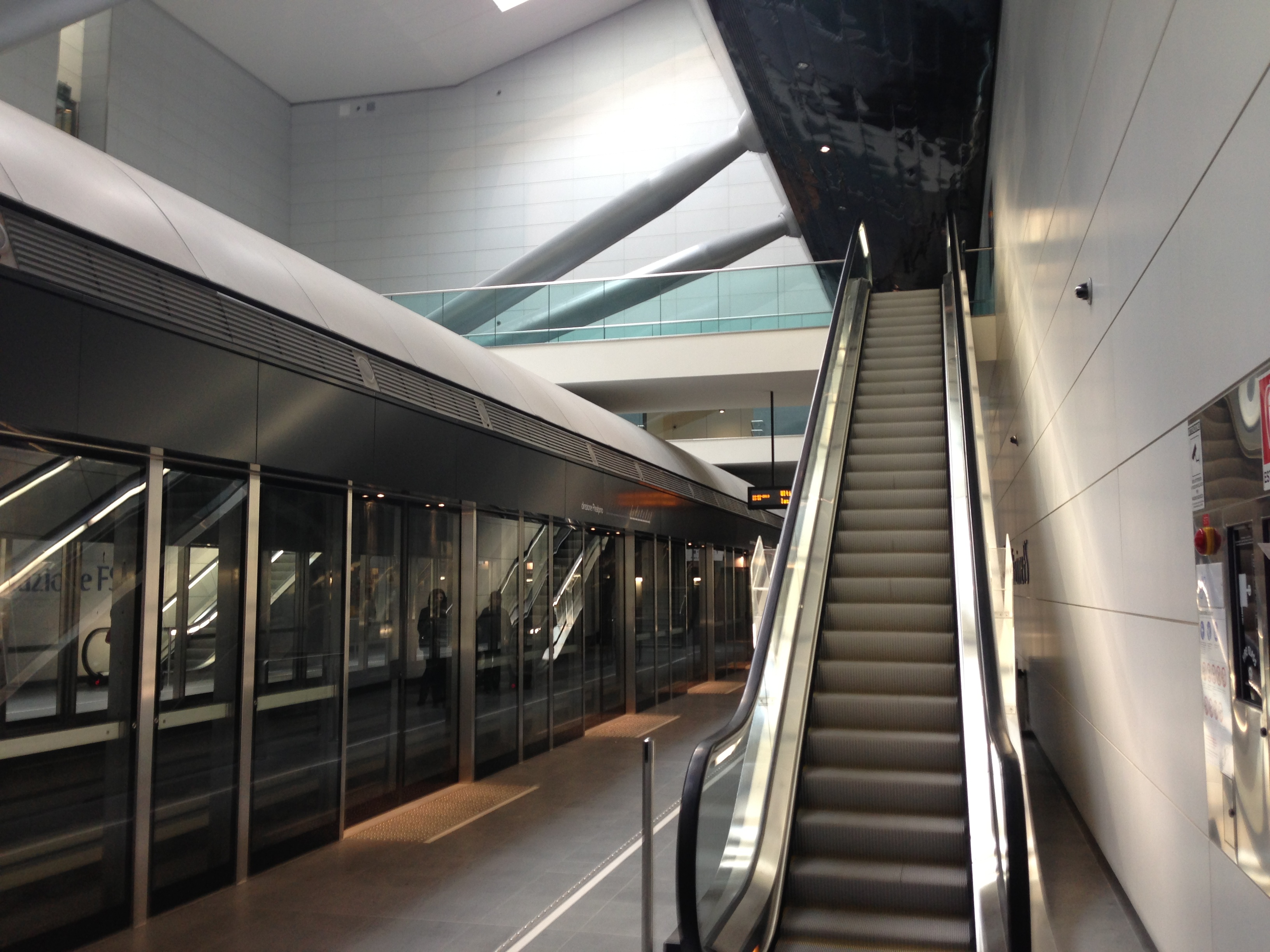
Stazione FS station

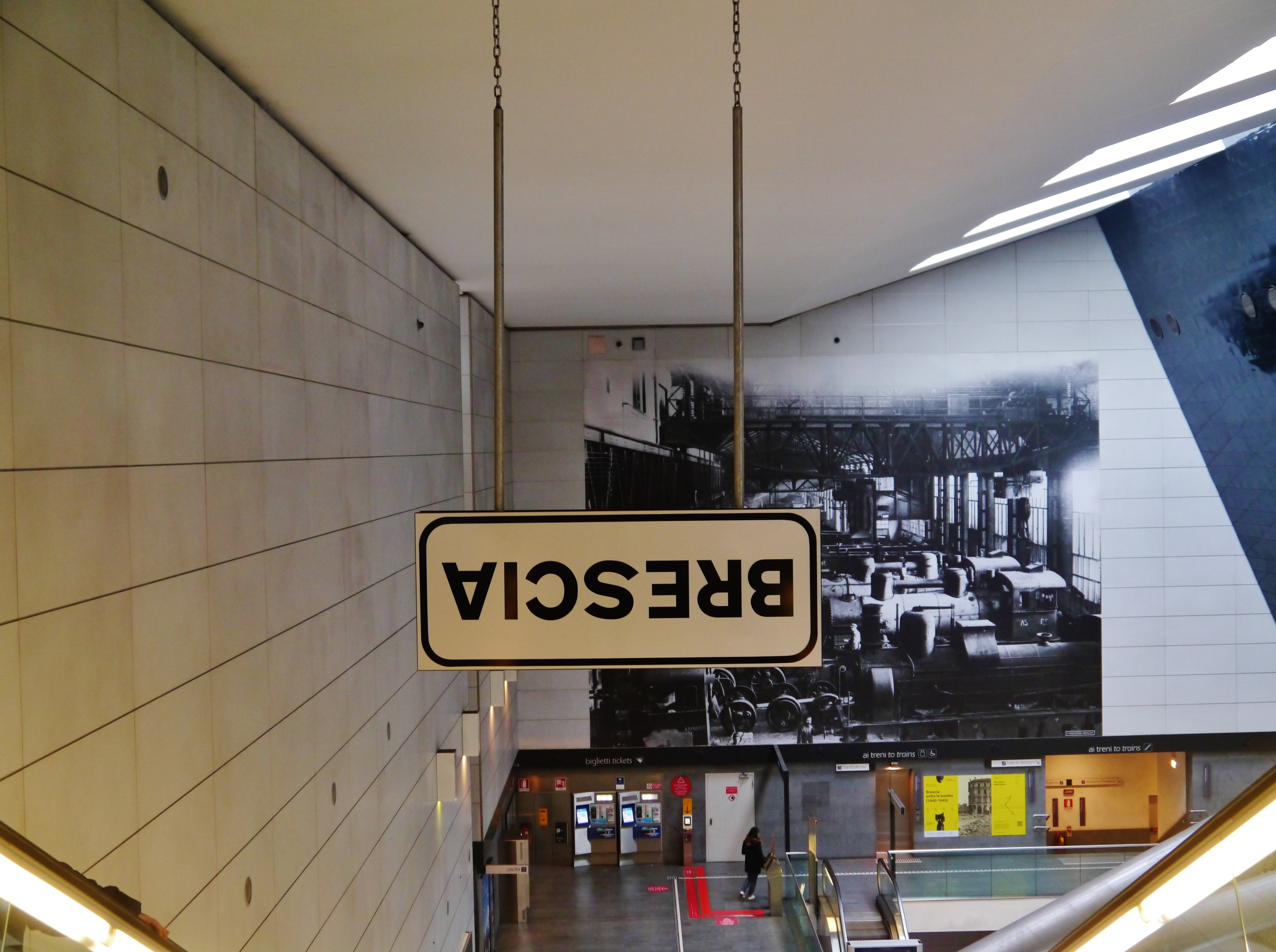
Underground Brescia signal at Stazione FS entrance

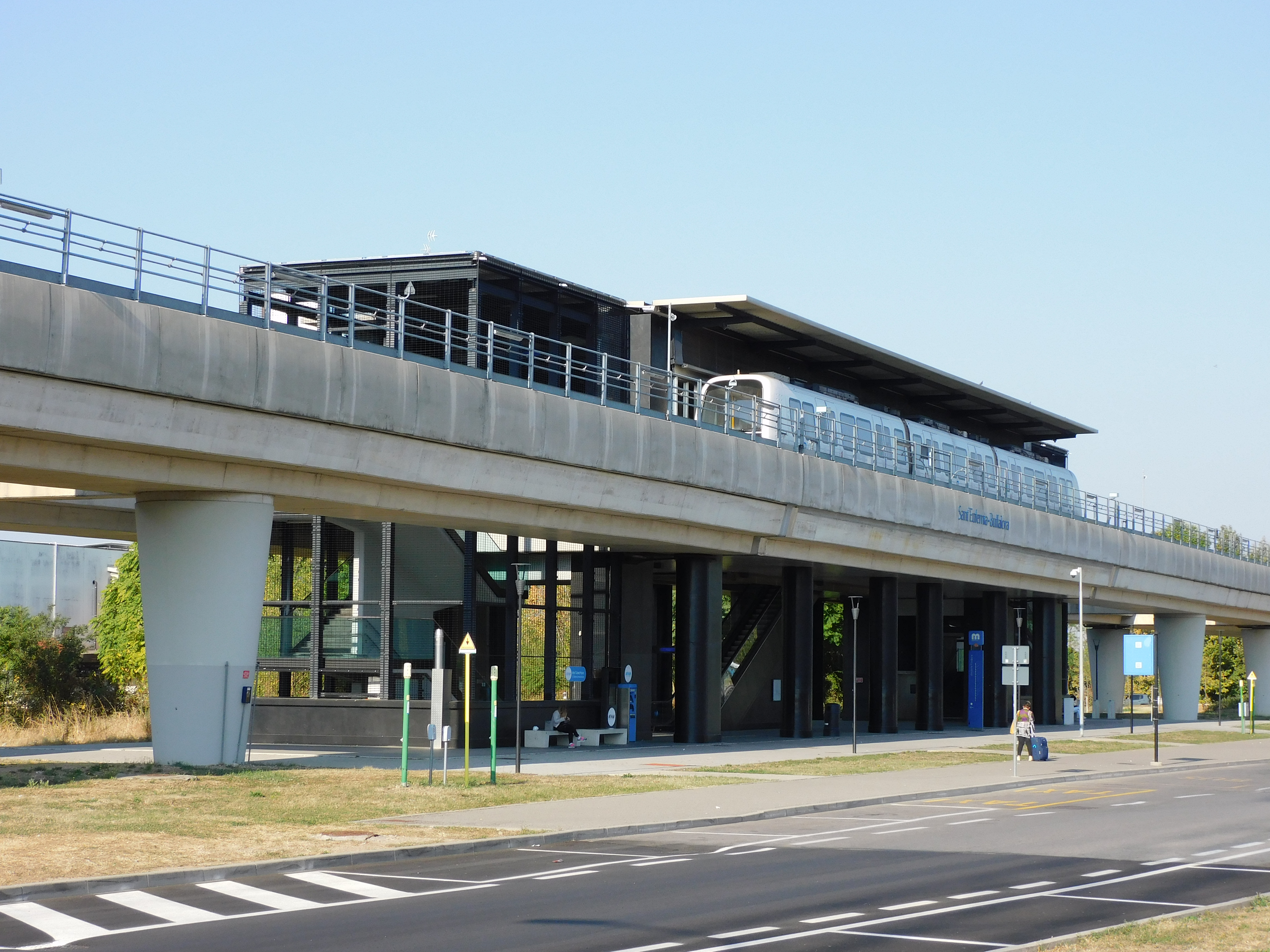
Sant'Eufemia elevated station

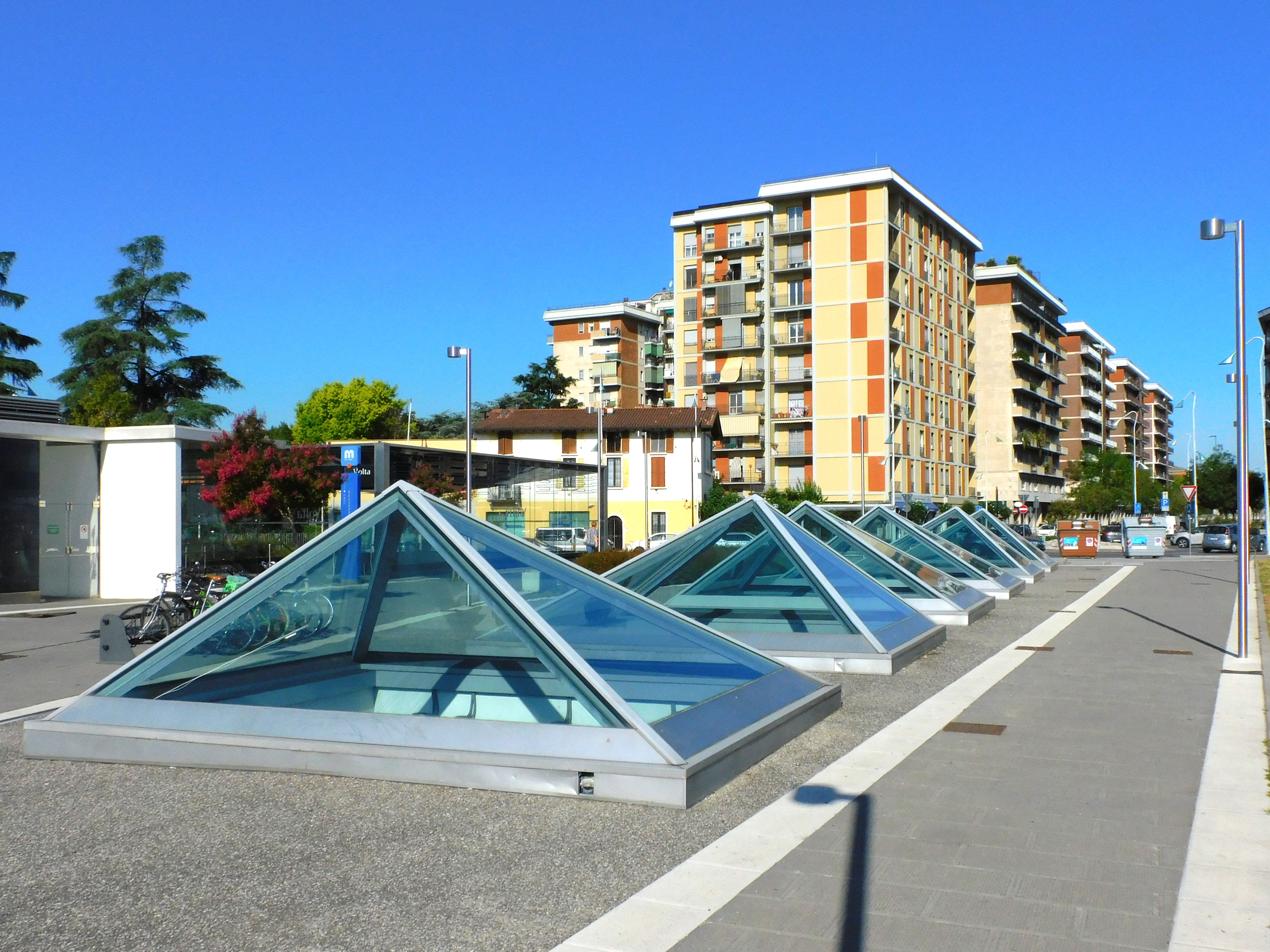
External skylights at Volta station

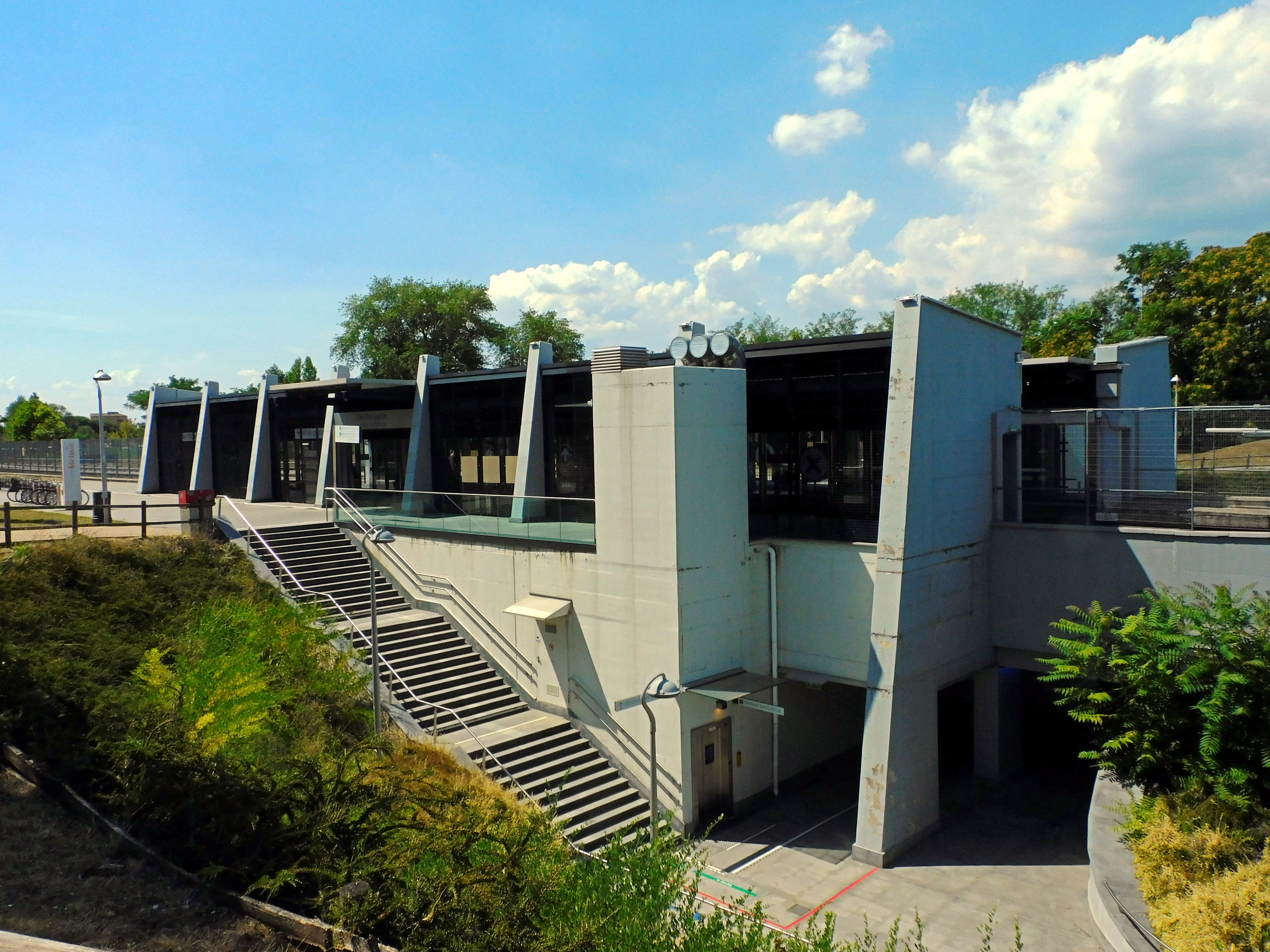
San Polo Parco station

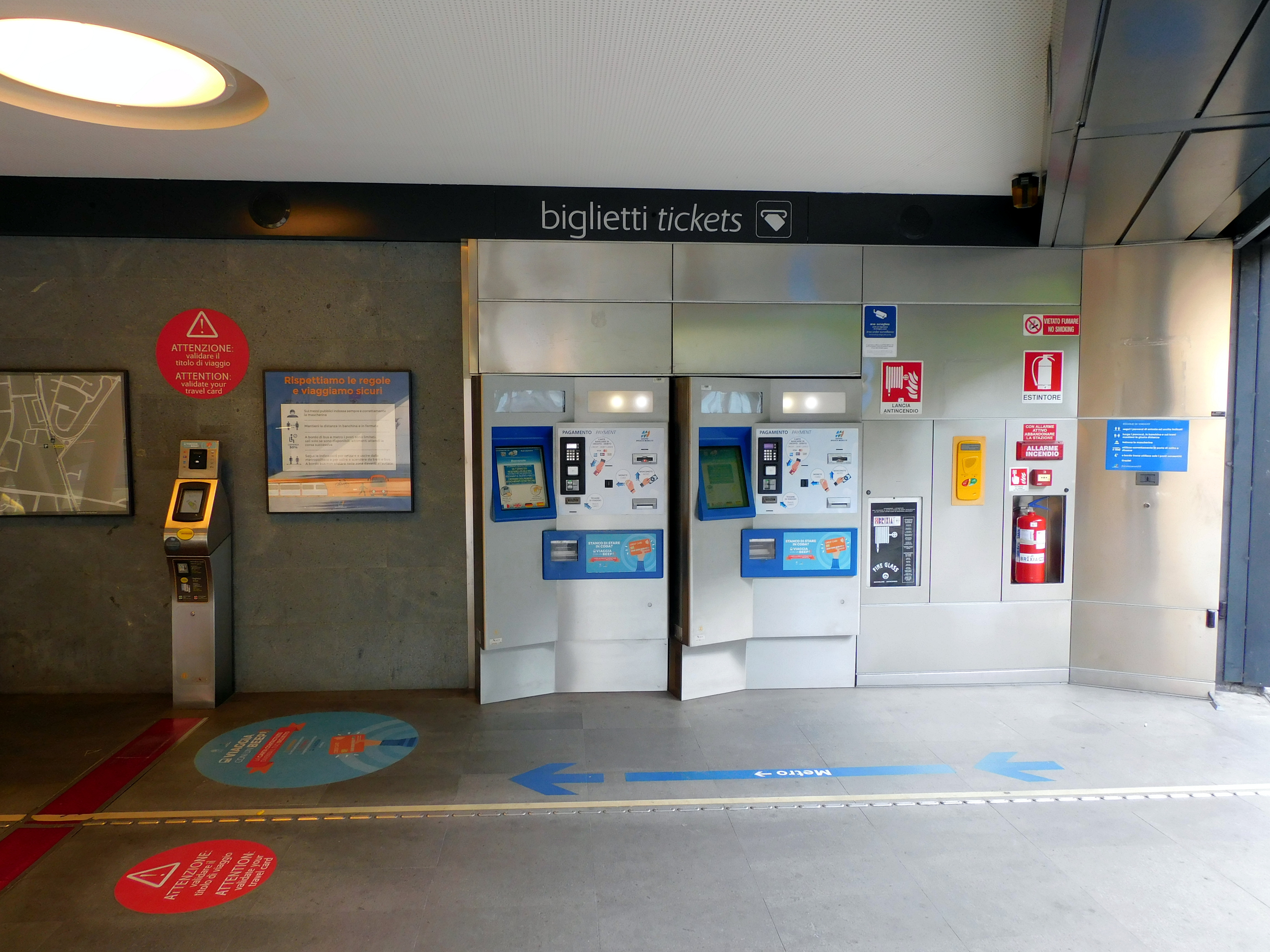
Ticket machine

== See also ==
- List of Brescia metro stations
- List of metro systems
- Trams in Brescia
