= Social Democratic Rebirth =

Social-democratic Italian political party

Social Democratic Rebirth Rinascita Socialdemocratica
- Secretary: Vittorino Navarra
- President: Giorgio Benincasa
- Founded: 1996
- Split from: European Liberal Social Democracy
- Ideology: Social democracy Social liberalism
- Political position: Centre
- National affiliation: Centre-right coalition (affiliated)

Website
- per-un-italia-diversa.webnode.it

The Social Democratic Rebirth (Rinascita Socialdemocratica), whose complete name is Movement of Social Democratic Rebirth (Movimento di Rinascita Socialdemocratica), is a social democracy minor political party in Italy.

== History ==
The party was founded by Luigi Preti on 17 February 1996 with a split from European Liberal Social Democracy (Socialdemocrazia Liberale Europea, SOLE) of Enrico Ferri, who wanted to federate the movement with the Christian Democratic Centre, while Preti insisted on an alliance with Forza Italia.

In 2000, the party federated itself with the Socialist Party, which changed its name into Socialist Party − Social Democracy (Partito Socialista − Socialdemocrazia). In 2001, it changed its name into Social Democratic Party (Partito Socialdemocratico).

In 2006, the PSD formed a federation with Sergio De Gregorio's party, Italians in the World. After the legal recourse to the court of Rome by Giorgio Carta (leader of the Italian Democratic Socialist Party) against the name and the logo of the PSD, in 2007 the party, through an extrajudicial settlement, decided to resolve the controversy returning to the old name Social Democratic Rebirth.

In 2007, the former PSDI leader Franco Nicolazzi joined the party, which was renamed Party of Social Democrats (Partito dei Socialdemocratici). After some divergences between the two groups into the party, there was a split: Preti and Vittorino Navarra maintained the name of Social Democratic Rebirth, while the Nicolazzi group obtained the name of Party of Social Democrats (Partito dei Socialdemocratici). Since Preti's death in 2009, the party was led by Vittorino Navarra.

The party endorsed Francesco Schittulli in the 2015 Apulian regional election. In 2016, the party campaigned for No in the 2016 Italian constitutional referendum. In the same year, they endorsed the centre-right coalition candidate for the mayoral election in Cento.

In 2020, the party endorsed the centre-right coalition candidate, Daniele Marchetti (Lega Nord Romagna), for the mayoral election in Imola. In the 2022 Italian general election, the party aligned with the centre-right coalition.

== Leadership ==
- President: Luigi Preti (1996–2009), Vittorino Navarra (2009–present)
  - Vice President: Gianni Manzolini (1996–present)
  - Coordinator: Furio Zanelli (2006–present)
