= Trials and allegations involving Silvio Berlusconi =

Trials and allegations involving Silvio Berlusconi have been extensive and include abuse of office, bribery and corruption of police officers, judges and politicians, collusion, defamation, embezzlement, extortion, false accounting, mafia, money laundering, perjury, tax fraud, underage prostitution influence and witness tampering.

== Allegations ==
Berlusconi was tried in Italian courts in several cases. The outcome for six of those cases were politically altered to end with "no conviction", because of laws passed by Berlusconi's parliamentary majority shortening the time limit for prosecution of various offences and making false accounting illegal only if there is a specific damaged party reporting the fact to the authorities. Berlusconi claimed that "this is a manifest judicial persecution, against which I am proud to resist, and the fact that my resistance and sacrifice will give the Italians a more fair and efficient judicial system makes me even more proud", and added that "789 prosecutors and magistrates took an interest in the politician Berlusconi from 1994 to 2006 with the aim of subverting the votes of the Italian people" citing statistics that he said have constituted a "calvary including 577 visits by police, 2,500 court hearings and 174 million euros in lawyers' bills paid by me". Berlusconi had always been able to afford top lawyers and publicists, for example Nicolas Sarkozy was one of his French top defenders. Some of his former prosecutors later joined the parliamentary opposition. Some of his attorneys are also members of parliament.

Overview of legal issues for Silvio Berlusconi
Status of trial		Allegation
Convictions		Mediaset trial 2: on a personal tax evasion of €7.3 million committed in 1994–98 through illicit trade of movie rights between secret fictive companies. (First-instance: 4 years jail and 3 years public office ban; Appeal Court: 4 years jail and 5 years public office ban; Supreme Court: 4 years jail and 2 years public office ban; ECHR: appeal rejected, no human rights violations found in the trial)
Acquittals	Acquittal, due to a changed law	All Iberian 2: false accounting. (acquittal, due to the new law on false accounting passed in April 2002 by the Berlusconi II Cabinet which had the effect of decriminalizing the offence of false accounting.); SME-Ariosto 2: false accounting. (acquittal, due to the new law on false accounting passed in April 2002 by the Berlusconi II Cabinet which had the effect of decriminalizing the offence.)
Acquittals	Other acquittals	SME-Ariosto 1: bribes to the judges Renato Squillante (600 million lira) and Filippo Verde (750 million lira), swaying them to rule in favor of Berlusconi in a court case deciding to whom IRI should sell the SME company. (First-instance: guilty of bribing Squillante but acquitted due to statute of limitations; Appeal Court: Acquitted for complicity in the crime; Supreme Court: Acquitted for complicity in the crime.); Bribery of the Guardia di Finanza (Arces process): Payment of 380 million lira in bribes to three officers of the Guardia di Finanza engaged in tax audits, convincing them to "turn the blind eye" against tax frauds committed by 4 Fininvest owned companies: Videotime (1989), Arnoldo Mondadori Editore (1991), Mediolanum (1992) and TELE+ (1994). (First-instance: 2 years 9 months jail; Appeal Court: statute of limitations for the first 3 cases, acquittal for the fourth (not proven); Supreme Court: full acquittal for all 4 cases; In 2010, the Supreme Court noted through its ruling in the Bribery of lawyer David Mills to commit perjury case, that his false testimony had resulted in an incorrect acquittal for the charges against Silvio Berlusconi in the Arces process. But when considering the statute of limitations now apply for all four charges in the case, the judicial system did not find it appropriate to reopen the case); Medusa Film company purchase: false accounting equal to 10bn lira (€5.2 million), which were secretly transferred to Berlusconi's private bank accounts in 1988. (First-instance: 1 year and 4 months imprisonment; Appeal Court: Full acquittal; Supreme Court: Full acquittal, as he was too rich to be aware of such small amounts); Macherio estate land acquisitions 2: embezzlement, tax evasion, false accounting for the company Idra. (Appeal Court: full acquittal for all three charges); Mediatrade investigation (Milan): tax evasion and embezzlement from TV-rights traded by the company Mediatrade in 1999–02; a subcase of Mediaset Trial 1+2. (Preliminary hearing: full acquittal; Supreme Court: full acquittal); Mediatrade investigation (Rome): €10 million tax evasion from TV-rights traded by the company Mediatrade in 2003–4; a subcase of Mediaset Trial 1+2. (Preliminary hearing: Statute of limitations for 2003 offences and full acquittal for 2004 offences; Supreme Court: appeal was rejected as inadmissible); Telecinco TV-channel (Spanish case): Violation of the antitrust law, money laundering, and tax fraud equal to 100bn lira (€52 million). (Spanish Supreme Court: full acquittal)
Discharged		RAI-Fininvest advertising cartel: Berlusconi was through his status as upcoming Prime Minister accused of extortion towards RAI in September 1993, in the attempt of convincing them to sign a cartel agreement on the advertising shares between RAI and the Fininvest TV networks, to get softer competition and higher prices. (Preliminary hearing: The judge ruled the case to be archived due to insufficient amounts of evidence); Drug trafficking: Tax bribery on Pay-TV: Mafia bombings of 1992–1993: Investigations dropped due to lack of evidence. Close associate Marcello Dell'Utri was convicted of collusion with the Mafia, but this was later overturned.; Connection to the Mafia: Defendant together with Marcello Dell'Utri for money laundering.; Saccà case: Bribery and attempted bribery.; State flights: Abuse in the use of flight status.; Defamation by use of TV-medium: Defamation aggravated by the use of the television medium.; Trani investigation: Abuse of office for the President of the pressures on the AGCOM.
Guilty of extinct crimes	Time limits extinct crimes (Note: The statute of limitations vary from case to case, as it is calculated according to the maximum penalty for the criminal code referred to by the indictment. If proceedings gets delayed due to circumstances not being caused by the court system, the limitation period can be extended up till maximum 25%. In addition, the limitation period can also be extended if the judge conclude presence of "specific aggravating circumstances" due to repeated relapse of committing specific crimes. In rare cases, the limitation period can also be reduced due to extenuating circumstances. "If the application of the statute of limitations due to terminate shall be a result of the granting of extenuating circumstances, the judgment is characterized by a prior acknowledgment of guilt of the accused and is a source of injury to him.")	Lodo Mondadori: bribery of judges. (statute of limitation acquittal); All Iberian 1: 23 billion lira (€11.9 million) bribe to Bettino Craxi via an offshore bank account code-named All Iberian. (First-instance: 2 years 4-month jail; Appeal Court: acquitted since the statute of limitations expired before the appeal); Bribery of lawyer David Mills: to make a false testimony in the two processes All Iberian and Bribery of the Guardia di Finanza. (Statute of limitation acquittal); Abuse of office in the Bancopoli/Unipol affair: concerning the illegal publication of wiretapped conversations in a family newspaper in 2005. (First-instance: 1-year jail + €80,000 compensatory damage payment to Piero Fassino; Appeal Court: Acquittal due to statute of limitations, but upheld the compensatory payment.)
Guilty of extinct crimes	Time limits extinct crimes, due to a changed law	Lentini affair: false accounting. (guilty, but acquitted due to a reduced statute of limitations in a new false accounting law passed by the Berlusconi government); Fininvest financial statements in 1988–1992: false accounting and embezzlement. (guilty, but acquitted due to a reduced statute of limitations in a new false accounting law passed by the Berlusconi government); Fininvest consolidated financial statements: false accounting. (guilty, but acquitted due to a reduced statute of limitations in a new false accounting law passed by the Berlusconi government); Mediaset trial 1: on false accounting and embezzlement committed in 1988–94 for the company Fininvest SpA. (indicted in 2005, but in 2007, the charges were declined ahead of the first-instance court trial, due to statute of limitations)
Guilty of extinct crimes	Amnesty extinct crimes	Propaganda Due (P2) Masonic Lodge trial: committed perjury when he testified in a later libel court trial filed against three journalists in 1989, that he had only joined the P2 lodge shortly before it was revealed as illegal without even paying entry fee; which was contradicted by evidence that he had been a paying member for 3 years. (Appeal Court: guilty, but offense was pardoned by an amnesty law passed in 1989); Macherio estate land acquisitions 1: false accounting for the company Buonaparte. (guilty, but amnesty applied following the 1992 fiscal remission law)
Ongoing trials		Bribery of senators supporting the Prodi government: Sergio De Gregorio and other senators bribed in 2006, to topple the Prodi government. (First-instance: court trial began on 11 February 2014); Defamation against Antonio Di Pietro: who was accused during a 2008 election campaign of having obtained his educational degree thanks to the secret services. (In June 2013 the Constitutional Court ruled that the Italian constitution did not grant parliamentarians absolute immunity for spoken words during election campaigns. This ruling allow for Berlusconi's previously halted court case now to be re-opened by the Constitutional Court to judge the merits of the case. The case will however be suspended until the affiliated case against the Italian Chamber of Deputies, where two courts asked for annulment of its 22 September 2010 decree granting Berlusconi absolute parliamentary immunity, has been judged. On 18 July 2014, the Constitutional Court ruled the decree indeed was unconstitutional and annulled it; meaning that the civil court proceedings against Berlusconi now can continue.)

== Completed trials ==
=== Propaganda Due (P2) trial: False testimony (1989) ===
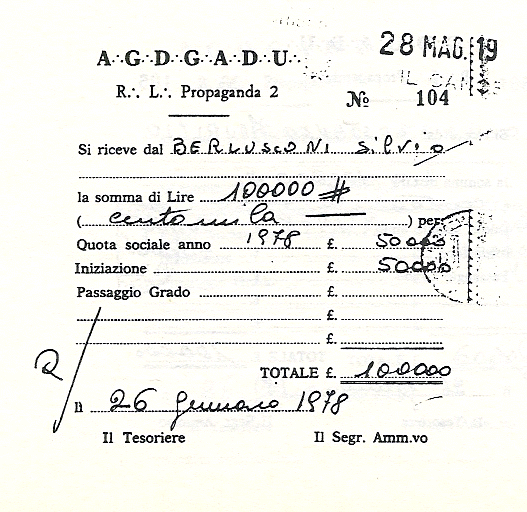
Receipt for membership of Silvio Berlusconi to "Propaganda 2" (P2) masonic lodge

In 1981, a scandal arose after the police discovery of Licio Gelli's secret quasi-Masonic (freemason) lodge Propaganda 2 (P2), which aimed to change the Italian political system to a more authoritarian regime. The list of people involved in P2 included members of the secret services and some prominent characters from political arena, business, military and media. Silvio Berlusconi, who was then just starting to gain popularity as the founder and owner of Canale 5 TV channel, was listed as a member of P2. The P2 lodge was dissolved by the Italian Parliament in December 1981 and a law was passed declaring similar organisations illegal, but no specific crimes were alleged against individual members of the P2 lodge. While the Italian Constitution had forbidden secret associations since 1948, Berlusconi later (in 1989) sued three journalists for libel for writing articles hinting at his involvement in financial crimes. In court, he declared that he had joined the P2 lodge "only for a very short time before the scandal broke" and "he had not even paid the entry fee". Such statements conflicted with the findings of the parliamentary inquiry commission appointed to investigate the lodge's activity, with material evidence, and even with previous testimony of Berlusconi, all of which proved that he had actually been a member of P2 since 1978 and had indeed paid 100,000 Italian liras (approximately equivalent to €300 today) as an entry fee. In 1990, the court of appeal of Venice found Berlusconi guilty of false testimony in front of the Court of Verona, however the court could not pass sentence as the offense had been pardoned by an amnesty passed in 1989.

Some political commentators claim that Berlusconi's electoral programme followed the P2 plan.

=== Bribery of lawyer David Mills (1999) ===
David Mills, lawyer husband of the former British cabinet minister Tessa Jowell, acted for Berlusconi in the early 1990s, and was later accused by Italian prosecutors of money laundering and of accepting a gift from Berlusconi in return for witness evidence favourable to Berlusconi given in court. Mills claimed that the money in question came not from Berlusconi but from another client. Tessa Jowell then announced her separation from Mills, which some of the UK media suggested was an attempt to distance herself from a potential scandal. She also denied having discussed the money with her husband; Private Eye magazine published a satirical front cover of Jowell with a speech bubble stating: "I have never met my husband". In December 2010, information obtained by the Wikileaks website revealed Mr Berlusconi had become very fond of Ms Jowell, referring to her in private company as 'piccolo puntaspilli' (the little pincushion).

On 17 February 2009, Mills was found guilty of accepting a bribe of about 400,000 pounds sterling, allegedly from Silvio Berlusconi, and was sentenced to four-and-a-half years in prison. On 25 February 2010, the Court of Cassation gave a verdict towards David Mills of not guilty because the statute of limitations expired. The appeals court ruled on 25 February 2012, in a separate case against Silvio Berlusconi, that the crime should be dated on the exact day when the bribery transfer took place in November 1999, and not at the time of the counter service delivered in 2000, as prosecutors had previously argued, and on that ground Berlusconi was also awarded a Statute of limitation acquittal.

=== External relationship in mafia association ===
The Court of Palermo investigated Silvio Berlusconi and his associate Marcello Dell'Utri, on the charge of external partnership with Mafia associations and money laundering. Nine years later the trial ended with a sentence of 9 years imposed on Marcello Dell'Utri and the acquittal of Silvio Berlusconi.

=== Massacres of 1992–1993 ===
The Court of Florence and Caltanissetta investigated Silvio Berlusconi's connection with the Sicilian Mafia. He was accused of connections with the people responsible for the massacres of 1992 (Capaci and via D'Amelio) where two prosecuting magistrates, involved in the Mafia trial known as "Maxi-processo" of the 1980s, Giovanni Falcone and Paolo Borsellino were brutally murdered. The case was archived due to insufficient amounts of evidence found at the expiry of the investigative deadline.

=== RAI-Fininvest advertising cartel ===
Berlusconi was through his status as upcoming Prime Minister accused of extortion towards RAI in September 1993, in the attempt of convincing them to sign a cartel agreement on the advertising shares between RAI and the Fininvest TV networks (45% each), for achievement of softer competition and higher prices. The prosecutors investigation was launched in August 1994. The proposed agreement was never signed, because of being rejected by RAI. Through interrogation of Claudio Dematte (former RAI president), Gianni Locatelli (former RAI general manager), and Paolo Murialdi (former RAI administration director), it became clear that Locatelli had received oral "threats" from Berlusconi in September 1993, that if RAI rejected the proposed deal, then it would automatically also remove political goodwill by Berlusconi's political party to ever support potential recurrence of any RAI saving decrees. The preliminary hearing judge ruled in April 1995 for the case to be archived, due to insufficient amounts of evidence to proof extortion or incitement to corruption.

=== All Iberian 1 (Illegal financing of a political party in 1997) ===
Conviction set aside because the statute of limitations expired before Berlusconi exhausted all appeals.

=== Bribery of the Guardia di Finanza (Arces process) ===
Silvio Berlusconi (owner of Fininvest) was accused of complicity in corruption. The crime was perpetrated by Fininvest's payment of 380 million lira in bribes to three officers of the Guardia di Finanza engaged in tax audits, in the attempt of convincing them to "turn a blind eye" against tax frauds committed by the four Fininvest owned companies (all with headquarters in Milan): Videotime (1989), Arnoldo Mondadori Editore (1991), Mediolanum (1992) and TELE+ (1994). The mix of interrogation by Paolo Berlusconi and Salvatore Sciascia (the former head of the tax office of Fininvest) made it clear, that the most important decisions were made by Silvio Berlusconi, who was aware of everything, and that sometimes the responsibility of managers were only a facade, because everything was decided by a very small group of people. Silvio Berlusconi was interrogated about his role in the case by the Milan prosecutor Antonio Di Pietro on 22 November 1994. An official indictment was launched against Silvio Berlusconi on 14 October 1995.

Court rulings

- First-instance Court (July 1998): sentenced Silvio Berlusconi to 2 years and 9 months imprisonment, for all four bribes.
- Court of Appeals (May 2000): For Silvio Berlusconi, the statute of limitations expired for the first three cases, and an acquittal was given on the fourth case, because the court gave him the benefit of the doubt (not proven). According to Italian law, the "statute of limitations" does not imply innocence but acquits the accused from any further legal proceeding; it may in fact indicate guilt if the statute of limitations is applied after conceding benefits for previous good conduct, since such benefits can only be granted after guilt is ascertained, as per Corte di Cassazione, Sect. IV, Sentence no. 5069, 21 May 1996.
- Court of Cassation (October 2001): full acquittal for Silvio Berlusconi in all 4 cases. The other accused in the case were judged to:
  - Paolo Berlusconi: full acquittal.
  - Alfredo Zuccotti (former managing director of Fininvest): 1 year and 4 months imprisonment.
  - Salvatore Sciascia (the former head of the tax office of Fininvest): 2 years and 6 months imprisonment.
  - Massimo Maria Berruti (the legal advisor to the group Segrate): 10 months imprisonment.
  - Vincenzo Tripodi (colonel of Guardia di Finanza): full acquittal.
  - Giovanni Arces (officer of Guardia di Finanza): 2 years imprisonment.
  - Angelo Capone (officer of Guardia di Finanza): 3 years imprisonment.
  - Francesco Nanocchio (officer of Guardia di Finanza): 2 years and 2 months imprisonment.

In April 2010, the supreme court noted through the published motivations of its ruling in the Bribery of lawyer David Mills to commit perjury case, that his false testimony had resulted in an incorrect acquittal for the charges against Silvio Berlusconi in the Arces process. But when considering the statute of limitations now apply for all four charges in the case, the judicial system did not find it appropriate to reopen the case.

=== Illegal financing of a political party on All Iberian 1: statute of limitations ===
Court of First Instance: sentenced to jail (2 years and 4 months) for paying 21 billion lire (about 10 million euro) to Bettino Craxi via an offshore bank account codenamed "All Iberian".
Court of Appeal: the statute of limitations expired before the appeal was completed so Silvio Berlusconi was acquitted.

=== Medusa Film company purchase ===
In October 1995, Berlusconi received a "notice of investigation" from the prosecutor Margherita Taddei, on charges of false accounting and embezzlement connected to the purchase by Reteitalia (a subsidiary of Fininvest and the holding company of Canale 5) of the company Medusa Film, back in 1988. According to the financial statements of Reteitalia the purchase had cost 28bn lira, but according to the owners of Medusa Film they only received 18bn lira for the sale. The difference on 10bn lira (equal to €5.2 million) had been silently transferred by Reteitalia in monthly tranches of 100 or 200 million lira at a time into five private bank accounts owned by Silvio Berlusconi. The initial response of Berlusconi, which came during a TV broadcast on 5 October 1995, was to say: "It' s absurd accusing me of embezzlement, since I own one hundred percent of Reteitalia". The prosecutor replied, that in Italy it is a crime to make hidden (not accounted for) payments to shareholders. Subsequently, Berlusconi declined to show up for interrogations with the prosecutor, referring to that he knew nothing about the money transfers to his five private bank accounts, and claimed it was so small amounts that he never himself had noticed/questioned why these extra amounts had been transferred. The prosecutor then instead interrogated four other business people from Reteitalia, and in November 1995 filed an indictment request for all five persons (including Silvio Berlusconi) for having committed false accounting and embezzlement. If the embezzlement charges would be proven by the court, this part of guilt would, however, be granted impunity due to a 1988 amnesty for the crime.

Court rulings

- First-instance court: 1 year and 4 months imprisonment for Silvio Berlusconi.
- Court of Appeals (February 2000): Full acquittal, since he was considered being too rich to be aware of such small amounts.^{a} The four other Reteitalia managers charged in the case received: Adriano Galliani (acquittal), Livio Gironi (acquittal), Giancarlo Foscale (acquittal), and Carlo Bernasconi (conviction confirmed).
- Court of Cassation (October 2001): Full acquittal, since he was considered being too rich to be aware of such small amounts.^{a} To be exact, the court ruled the previous Court of Appeals ruling to be upheld because: "re-examination of the same facts is not admissible to the Supreme Court".

^{a} Among the reasons for full acquittal were: (1) The 10bn transfers to Silvio's bank accounts were made by his father before he died, (2) As Reteitalia is managed independently from Fininvest managers, "one must also exclude a knowledge of the ex-post' enrichment and its causal" by Berlusconi, because it "would require the visibility of the 'increase of more than 10bn even after some months of using the bank accounts.", (3) But this visibility "is contradicted by reality," since "the multiplicity of bank accounts belonging to the family Berlusconi, the pulverization of the sum into five bank accounts and other large well-known heritage of Silvio Berlusconi in which the sums were widely divided to flow, postulate the impossibility of knowledge of both the extra saldo increases and especially the origin of the same.", (4) Without "knowledge and acceptance of the causal", there can be no "involvement of the defendant for the act of preparation false corporate communications.".

=== Bribing a judge on Lodo Mondadori: statute of limitations ===
First Court: A Prima facie case was issued, but the magistrate decided to drop the charges. The state attorney refused to file the case and appealed the decision.
Appeal Court: statute of limitations expired before the appeal was completed so Silvio Berlusconi was acquitted.

=== False accounting on All Iberian 2: not guilty (law changed) ===
First Court: On 26 September 2005, Berlusconi was acquitted because the new law on false accounting makes false accounting illegal only if there is a specific damaged party reporting the fact to the authorities. This new law was passed by Berlusconi's parliamentary majority after the beginning of the trial, and was claimed by the opposition to be an ad personam law, i.e. aimed at acquitting Berlusconi.

=== False accounting on Fininvest Media Group Consolidated: statute of limitations ===
Allegation: 750 million euro of illegal (black market) funds stored by Fininvest in 64 offshore companies. The statute of limitations expired due to the new laws on false accounting approved by Berlusconi's government, therefore an acquittal was given because no specific damaged party reported it to the government.

=== Embezzlement, tax fraud and false accounting on Macherio estates: 3 acquittals and 1 amnesty extinct crime ===
First Court: acquitted for embezzlement and tax fraud, the statute of limitations expired before a verdict was reached on the two cases of false accounting.
Appeal Court: acquitted for embezzlement, tax fraud and false accounting for the Idra company; while being guilty on false accounting for the Buonaparte company – a crime he however received amnesty for due to the 1992 fiscal remission law.

=== False accounting on Lentini affair: not guilty (law changed) ===
Allegation: 5 million euros paid secretly to Torino football club for buying the player Gianluigi Lentini bringing him to AC Milan.
First court: The statute of limitations expired due to the new laws on false accounting approved by Berlusconi's government, therefore the case was closed with an acquittal on 4 July 2002.

=== False accounting, embezzlement and tax fraud on Mediaset television and cinema rights: not proven ===
Silvio Berlusconi was on trial in relation to transactions carried out by the Berlusconi family's media company Mediaset in the 1990s. Prosecutors suspected two offshore firms controlled by a Berlusconi family holding, Fininvest, bought television and cinema rights from a US firm. The companies, it was alleged, then sold the rights on at inflated prices to Mediaset, also controlled by Fininvest, to avoid Italian taxes and create a slush fund. The trial started on 21 November 2006. The court acquitted Berlusconi, giving him the benefit of the doubt (not proven).

=== Violation of antitrust law, money laundering, and tax fraud, through transactions by the Telecinco TV-channel (Spanish case): not proven ===
In Spain, Silvio Berlusconi, along with other Fininvest managers, was charged with violation of antitrust law, money laundering, and tax fraud for 100bn lira, for the TV-channel Telecinco he founded. The trial was suspended from 1999 to 2006 due to the immunity enjoyed by Berlusconi from being a leader of a foreign government. In April 2006, when Romano Prodi replaced Berlusconi as Italian prime minister, the Spanish judge Baltasar Garzón reopened the court procedure against him. In 2008, the lawyer Niccolo Ghedini announced the Spanish supreme court had ruled a complete acquittal towards Berlusconi and all other previously accused in the case.

=== Corrupting a judge and false accounting on SME-Ariosto: not guilty ===
At its outset, the trial SME-Ariosto involved both Cesare Previti and Silvio Berlusconi. Subsequently, a bill was approved by the Italian parliament, the so-called "Lodo Maccanico" act (also known as "Lodo Schifani", after the name of Renato Schifani, the lawyer of Berlusconi and now speaker of the Italian Senate who was also a member of parliament working on the law). This law guaranteed immunity to the five highest officers of the state (premier, president of the Republic, Senate's speaker, Deputy Chamber's speaker, Constitutional Court's president) during their period in office. To avoid complete suspension of the trial, the Court of Milan split it into two parts, one regarding Cesare Previti, the other Silvio Berlusconi. The Cesare Previti part of the trial resulted in a guilty verdict. In the other part (regarding Silvio Berlusconi) the Italian Prime Minister's innocence had still not been proven but the case had to be stopped because of the "Lodo Maccanico"' immunity act. On 16 April 2004, the Constitutional Court declared that the "Lodo Maccanico" violated articles n. 3 and 34 of the Italian Constitution, therefore this immunity act was declared unconstitutional and the trial resumed. After 12 years of trial, Silvio Berlusconi was acquitted on 27 April 2007, because of art.530 comma 2 ("He didn't commit the fact", i.e. full acquittal).

=== Tax fraud on Telecinco: not guilty ===
Silvio Berlusconi was indicted in Spain for charges of tax fraud and violation of anti-trust laws regarding the private TV network Telecinco. All the accused have been acquitted by the Spanish "Corte de Casacion" in July 2008.

=== Country flights ===
On 3 June 2009, Silvio Berlusconi was charged Roman prosecutor Giovanni Ferrara with abuse of office for using government-funded flights for personal use.

=== Trani episode ===
Berlusconi was signed in the register of suspects, for some telephone interceptions where "he forced the director of a tv channel, to close the TV political program Annozero" as said by the magistrate Michele Ruggiero.

=== Investigation of Milan ===
In October 2010, Silvio Berlusconi and his son Piersilvio were investigated in connection with false financial statements.

=== Abuse of office in the Unipol case (2005) ===
In February 2012, Milan prosecutors charged Berlusconi with abuse of office in 2005, in connection with the publication of wiretapped conversations in the Italian newspaper Il Giornale, which is owned by Berlusconi's brother Paolo Berlusconi. The publication of the conversations between then Governor of the Bank of Italy Antonio Fazio, senior management of Unipol and Italian centre-left politician Piero Fassino was a breach of secrecy rules and was seen at the time as an attempt to discredit Berlusconi's political rivals. Their publication also eventually led to the collapse of the proposed takeover of Banca Nazionale del Lavoro by Unipol and the resignation of Fazio. The head of the company used by Italian prosecutors to record the conversations has been previously convicted of stealing the recordings and making them available to Berlusconi. On 7 February 2012, at an initial court hearing, Berlusconi denied he had listened to the tapes and ordered their publication. The first-instance ruling was issued 7 March 2013, and sentenced Berlusconi to a year in prison and the joint payment together with his also convicted brother, of 80,000 euro as compensatory damages in favor of Piero Fassino in addition to court litigation costs of €10,000. On 31 March 2014, the Milan Court of Appeal ruled that the evidence did not clear Paolo and Silvio Berlusconi from guilt, but that the facts are now prescribed, which mean they were both acquitted due to the statutes of limitations. Although Paolo still had to pay €80,000 as compensatory damages to Fassino.

== Convictions ==
=== Tax fraud in the Mediaset trial ===
The Mediaset trial was launched in April 2005, with indictment of fourteen people (including Berlusconi) for having committed false accounting and embezzlement to mask payments of substantial black funds, committed in 1988–94; and tax fraud equal in total to more than €62 million (120 billion of Italian lire), committed in 1988–98.

Both indictments were related to achievement of personal tax evasion, through illicit trade of movie rights between Mediaset and secret fictive foreign companies situated in tax haven nations, causing fictive losses for Mediaset, with the trade gains being accumulated by the foreign companies owned by the indicted tax fraudsters, who ultimately had the gains paid out as personal profit without paying tax in Italy. In 2007, the court case at first-instance had not yet been launched, and the prosecutors dropped the (A) charges against Berlusconi due to the statute of limitations, and for the same reason the (B) charges were narrowed down to the 1994–98 period, in which the prosecutor charged Berlusconi for having committed a personal tax evasion of €7.3 million.

On 26 October 2012, Berlusconi was sentenced to four years of punishment by an Italian court for tax evasion. The charges were in relation to a scheme to purchase overseas film rights at inflated prices through offshore companies. The four-year term was longer than the three years and eight months the prosecutors had requested, but was shortened to one year in accord with a 2006 amnesty law intended to reduce prison overcrowding. Berlusconi and his co-defendants were also ordered to pay a 10 million euro fine and were banned from holding public office for three years.

On 8 May 2013, the Court of Appeals in Milan confirmed the four-year prison sentence, and extended the public office ban to five years. On 1 August 2013, the Court of Cassation (final appeal) confirmed the sentence of 4 years, of which the last three years are automatically pardoned. The decision marked the first time that Berlusconi received a definitive sentence, despite being on trial nearly 30 times during the last 25 years. In regards of calculating the exact length of the public office ban, the Court of Cassation asked the lower court to re-judge this, because of prosecutors having presented new legal arguments for the ban to be reduced from five to three years. A new anti-corruption law passed in late 2012, referred to as the Severino law, would bar Berlusconi from seeking elective office for six years, independently of the court's final ruling regarding the length of the public office ban. The ramification of his public office ban was that it made him ineligible to serve any public office but technically he would still have been allowed as a non-candidate to continue leading his party and centre-right coalition in election campaigns. A similar situation occurred in March 2013, when the leader of the Five Star Movement, Beppe Grillo, convicted over a road accident in 1988, led his party's 2013 election campaign despite not being able to run for public office because of a rule established within his movement.

Due to being over 70 years of age, Berlusconi was not placed direct in prison but could decide if he wanted to serve his one-year jail term either by a house arrest at one of his private residences or by doing community service. As the gross prison term exceeds two years, the Severino law prompted the Senate to vote if Berlusconi shall be forced to resign his current senate seat immediately, or alternatively allowing the court imposed ban on holding public office only to take effect by the end of his current legislative term. The pending senate vote, combined with anger over Berlusconi's conviction (a poll indicated 42% of the public believed he was unfairly persecuted by the magistrates) presented a serious political challenge for the fragile ruling coalition. On 3 August, Berlusconi suggested that unless a solution to his predicament could be found, Italy was at "risk of a civil war". The following day, thousands of supporters gathered in front of his house in protest of the ruling.

On 30 August, Italian President Giorgio Napolitano announced he had not selected Berlusconi as one of the new four lifetime senators, which are granted the privileges of being a lawmaker for life with some protected legal immunity, meaning they can continue working in politics even after being convicted guilty for criminal offences that otherwise would lead to ban from serving one of the public offices. On 9 September, a Senate committee began its deliberations to decide if Berlusconi's public office ban shall start immediately or by the end of his current legislative term. Before the committee decision becomes effective, it also needed to be approved by a vote in the full Senate.

The deliberations of the Senate committee lasted for several weeks before they reach a decision. According to the Severino law, which became enacted by the Monti government in December 2012, anyone sentenced to more than two years in prison is deemed ineligible to hold public office for a period of six years, or eight years if convicted for abuse of power, and should immediately be expelled from the parliament. Berlusconi argued that the Severino law can not be used to expel persons convicted for crimes committed before December 2012, and pleaded for the proceedings to be postponed until the European Court of Human Rights or the Constitutional Court of Italy had ruled, whether or not he was correct about his interpretation of the law. Berlusconi also stated that he in any case had decided to appeal the court ruling against him to the European Court of Human Rights, as he still claimed the ruling itself to be a political and unjust attempt by his opponents, to deprive him of his political power. The response by Prime Minister Enrico Letta's centre-left Democratic Party was to reject Berlusconi's plea, accusing him of only launching time-wasting maneuvers. Berlusconi's PDL party then made a threat to withdraw their support for the government if the Senate committee expelled Berlusconi as senator. The Democratic Party replied by warning the PDL that they would reject any blackmail attempts, and in any case only would vote in the Senate committee according to the standard of the Italian law. Ahead of the Senate committee's voting, the leading criminal lawyer Paola Severino, who helped design the Severino law, stated to la Repubblica that this specific law in her professional opinion also applied for crimes being committed before its enactment in December 2012.

On 10 September, at the second day of the Senate deliberations, the Democratic Party stated they intended to vote down all three PDL submitted motions to delay the Senate deliberations, and accused PDL of obstructing the work of the Senate committee by playing delaying tactics. Renato Brunetta, floor leader of the PDL in the lower house, responded by saying: "If the Democratic Party and Grillo's people decide this evening to vote against the proposals, the Democratic Party will bring down the Letta government." The meeting at the second day ended with PDL agreeing to drop their series of technical objections to try to halt the hearings, on the agreement that each of the committee members could speak at greater length in a broad discussion on the merits of the case. On 18 September, Berlusconi made a national televised speech, in which he pledged to stay as party leader of a revived Forza Italia, no matter if the Senate would end up deciding to expel him or not. On 25 September, the PDL parliamentary group agreed on a resolution to threaten the Senate, that if Berlusconi would be expelled, then all PDL parliamentarians would immediately "reflect on and decide according to his or her conscience", whether or not to show sympathy with Berlusconi by resigning their own seats in the Senate. The Senate Committee nevertheless voted 15:8 in support for a recommendation to expel Berlusconi on 4 October, and ten days later submitted a final report about the case so that it can be scheduled for a final vote in the full Senate by early November. The Rules of Procedure Committee decided at its meeting on 30 October, by the votes 7:6, that Berlusconi's expulsion vote shall not be conducted as a secret vote but as an open public vote. On 27 November 2013, the Senate voted 192:113 for enforcement of Berlusconi's immediate expulsion and a six-year ban from serving any legislative office.

Berlusconi was expected to start serving his four-year prison sentence (reduced to one year), either under house arrest or doing unpaid social community work, in mid-October 2013. In mid-October, he informed the court that he preferred to serve the sentence by doing community service. Because of bureaucracy in the legal court system, it was however expected his one-year-long full-time community service would only start in around April 2014. On 19 October, the Milan appeal court ruled that Berlusconi's public office ban should be reduced from five to two years; which was later also confirmed by the Court of Cassation. The court imposed this public office ban, which did not change the fact that, according to the Severino law, Berlusconi received a ban preventing him from running as a candidate in legislative elections for a prolonged six-year period, which effectively superseded the shorter court imposed public office ban. Berlusconi began his community service at a Catholic care home centre on 9 May 2014, where he was required to work four hours a week for a year with elderly dementia patients.

As of 2017, Berlusconi's appeal regarding his six-year public office ban was pending before the European Court of Human Rights. On 22 October 2026, the ECHR subsequently rejected the appeal, finding no violations of human rights during the trial.

== Ongoing proceedings ==
=== Bribery of senators supporting the Prodi government (2006) ===
In February 2013, Silvio Berlusconi was under investigation for corruption and illegal financing of political parties from the public prosecutor of Naples, in the figures of Vincenzo Piscitelli, Henry John Woodcock, Francesco Curcio, Alessandro Milita and Fabrizio Vanorio. He was accused of bribing in 2006, with €3 million (of which 1 million declared and 2 million undeclared to the tax authorities), directed to Senator Sergio De Gregorio (the former leader of the Italians in the World party) to facilitate its passage into the ranks of the Berlusconi led coalition House of Freedoms. Along with Berlusconi, a journalist (Valter Lavitola) at the head of the newspaper Avanti! was also investigated, and Sergio De Gregorio self-confessed being the recipient of the bribery.

On 23 October 2013, Silvio Berlusconi and Valter Lavitola were both indicted by the judge for preliminary hearings, Amelia Primavera. For Senator De Gregorio the process has already been closed in a preliminary hearing, because he opted to self-confess and bargained a reduced sentence of 20 months in prison for the crime. The court hearing at first-instance for the indicted Silvio Berlusconi, was scheduled to start on 11 February 2014. During the court proceedings, ex-senator Paolo Rossi (a former member of the Olive Tree party) also testified to have been offered a bribe from Berlusconi by another ex-Senator Antonio Tomassini (a former member of the defunct Christian Democrats), to change political sides and join Silvio Berlusconi's center-right bloc, so that they together could cause the fall of the Romano Prodi government in 2006–08. According to the prosecutors, Valter Lavitola was as well working on behalf of Berlusconi as a go-between attempting to also bribe other senators.

When his solicitor, Professor Coppi, "recalled the constitutional basis of the freedom of parliamentary activity, the prosecutor Woodcock reacted indicating the illegality of the transfer of money, which resulted in the sale of senators. The Naples Court ruled in favor of the second" thesis.

On 20 April 2017 the Appeal Court of Naples ruled that, although the accusations against Mr Berlusconi were true, the statute of limitations applied, in other words the case had been "timed out". It is worth noting that in spite of the overwhelming strength of the evidence against him, Mr Berlusconi went unpunished whilst the recipient of the bribe accepted a prison sentence. This was due to Berlusconi's government (in 2011) shortening the time limits for completing a successful prosecution before the statute of limitations kicked in, which allowed his lawyer to play for time.

=== Defamation against Antonio Di Pietro (2008) ===
Berlusconi repeatedly questioned the legitimacy of the educational degree of the former Operation "Clean Hands" magistrate and leader of the Italy of Values party, Antonio Di Pietro, when he during a 2008 election rally and in an episode of the talk show Porta a Porta in March 2008, repeatedly claimed, that Di Pietro had not obtained his magistrate degree by passing the exams, but with the complicity of the secret services diverted, in order to have a judge placed in the system to overturn the parties of the so-called First Republic. Di Pietro subsequently sued Berlusconi for aggravated defamation in June 2008. The public prosecutor concluded the preliminary investigation 13 November 2009, by indicting Berlusconi for the defamation offense referred to in Article 595 paragraph 2 of the Criminal Code. The Italian Chamber of Deputies then intervened in the case by passing a decree 22 September 2010, granting all Italian parliamentarians "absolute immunity" for words spoken while elected.

On 5 October 2010, the court in Viterbo considered Berlusconi could not be judged or punished, because of the parliamentarian immunity Article 68 of the Italian constitution forbidding any legal prosecutions against words spoken by parliamentarians in the process of their "exercise of parliamentary duties", in conjunction with the Chamber of Deputies recently having voted for a decree to appoint Berlusconi absolute immunity for any spoken words while serving as a deputy. On 19 January 2012, this judgment was set aside by the Supreme Court, which ruled that Berlusconi had been speaking during a campaign rally and not in an institutional setting; meaning he was not covered by the immunity protection provided for by the constitutions Article 68, and consequently should face a new court trial to be held either at the Viterbo court or the Constitutional Court.

On 10 January 2013, the Viterbo court decided to transfer the case for judgement directly to the Constitutional Court. The Constitutional Court ruled on 20 June 2013, that the Chamber of Deputies decree having extended Berlusconi's immunity beyond what was provided for by the constitution, was a case with conflict of powers and should be disregarded. This mean that Berlusconi do not enjoy any special immunity protection for his spoken words during election campaigns, and that a court case now shall be held by the constitutional court, to decide the merits of the case. Before the case against Berlusconi can begin, the Italian Chamber of Deputies however shall be called for trial to defend and explain the reasons for passing their unconstitutional law from 2010. The court hearing against the Chamber of Deputies took place on 8 July 2014, where the constitutional court was asked to deem the concerned Chamber of Deputies decree to be unconstitutional and annul it, by the Court of Rome and the Viterbo court. On 18 July 2014, the Constitutional Court indeed ruled the decree to be unconstitutional and annulled it; meaning that the civil court proceedings against Berlusconi now can continue.

=== Ruby process: Child prostitution and abuse of office (2010) ===
Silvio Berlusconi was indicted for paying Moroccan nightclub dancer Karima El Mahroug, also known by the stage name Ruby Rubacuori (Italian for "Ruby the Heartstealer"), for sexual services between February and May 2010 when she was one year below the sexual criminal minimum age of 18. He was also indicted for abuse of office, by having arranged to have El Mahroug released from police detention, during an incident in which she was briefly held on claims of theft in May 2010. As evidence for the crimes, the police investigators submitted lawful interceptions of mobile phone conversations. In June 2013, Berlusconi was convicted of the charge and sentenced to seven years imprisonment and a lifetime public office ban, pending an appeal launched to the Appeals Court – and ultimately perhaps also a final appeal launched to the Court of Cassation. In January 2014, Silvio Berlusconi deposited an appeal against the judgment, requesting the complete absolution. The appeal process began on 20 June. On 18 July 2014, the Italian appeals court announced the appeal had been successful and the convictions against Berlusconi were being overturned. According to the court's published summary of the judgement, Berlusconi was acquitted from the extortion charges (abuse of power) because "the fact does not exist" and from the child prostitution charge because "the fact is not a crime". The more detailed court reasoning for acquittal will be published within 90 days, and the prosecutor stated he would then most likely appeal the decision to the Court of Cassation.

== Ongoing investigations ==
In addition to the ongoing court trials, Berlusconi was also involved in the following two ongoing legal investigations, which would have evolved to become an ongoing court trial if the judge at the preliminary hearing had indicted him of the alleged crime:

- Ruby ter (2011–13): Corruption in judicial acts (bribing witnesses) in connection with evidence submitted at the main "Ruby case". Allegedly a bribery with €2500 paid per month for each of the 18 Olgettine girls from Arcore (the girls – including Ruby – participating in the evening events at Berlusconi's residents) to speak in favor of Berlusconi, had been started by his two defending lawyers, Niccolò Ghedini and Piero Longo, in the aftermath of the opened police investigation on 15 January 2011. In addition, the Mediaset journalist Silvia Trevaini had allegedly been bribed, not only by the same monthly fee but also by extra gifts equal to €800,000. Finally Ruby, in particular, had been promised by Berlusconi "a huge reward if she would keep quiet or otherwise make him mad", and Ruby had replied she was "waiting for €5 million". On 23 January 2014, the public prosecutor Edmondo Bruti Liberati, asked for a legal case to be opened for a preliminary hearing.
- Illegal financing of the political party Italians in the World: On 16 April 2014, the Naples prosecutor deposited new documents in which Berlusconi was under investigation for the crime in recent years of illegal financing of the political party Italians in the World, being led by ex-Senator Sergio De Gregorio. Currently this process is under investigation, with an upcoming preliminary hearing to decide if a court indictment shall be filed.
