= Trabucchi =

Trabucchi is a surname. Notable people with the surname include:

- Giuseppe Trabucchi (1904–1975), Italian lawyer and politician
- Martina Trabucchi (born 2002), Italian biathlete

== See also ==
- Tabucchi
- [[Trabocchi Coast

]]
