= Emilio De Rose =

Italian dermatologist and politician (1939–2018)

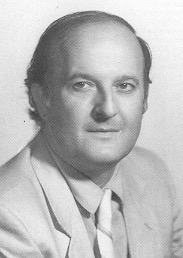

Minister of Public Works
- In office July 1987 – March 1988
- Prime Minister: Giovanni Goria
- Preceded by: Giuseppe Zamberletti
- Succeeded by: Enrico Ferri

Personal details
- Born: 27 March 1939 Marano Marchesato
- Died: 13 June 2018 (aged 79) Verona
- Party: PSDI (until 1989); UDS (1989); PSI (from 1989)

Emilio De Rose (27 March 1939 – 13 June 2018) was an Italian dermatologist and socialist politician who served as the minister of public works for one year in the period 1987–1988. For most of his career, he was a member of the Italian Democratic Socialist Party (Partito Socialista Democratico Italiano; PSDI).

== Biography ==
De Rose was born in Marano Marchesato, Cosenza, Calabria, on 27 March 1939. He worked in Verona as a physician. He had been a member of the Italian Socialist Party (PSI), but resigned from the party and joined the PSDI. From 1975 to April 1978 he was a PSDI municipal councilor in Verona.

He was elected to the Chamber of Deputies for the PSDI in 1983 and 1987. He served as the minister of public works from July 1987 to March 1988 in the cabinet led by Prime Minister Giovanni Goria. Within the PSDI, De Rose was a member of the current that advocated reunification with the Italian Socialist Party, and in early 1989 he followed Pier Luigi Romita and Pietro Longo into a new political formation, the Movement of Unity and Socialist Democracy (Movimento di Unità e Democrazia Socialista; UDS), which later that year was absorbed by the PSI. De Rose himself became a member of the Chamber's PSI group on 4 January 1990. He was not re-elected to the Chamber in the following general election and returned to his profession as a dermatologist.

== Views and arrest ==
De Rose was a declared Freemason, being a member of a city lodge named after Franklin D. Roosevelt. In April 1993 De Rosa was arrested in Verona due to accusations of abusing power whilst serving as a member of parliament and as a member of the executive of the PSDI. He was jailed for fifteen days and later acquitted of all charges in November 2003.

== Death ==
De Rose died in Verona in June 2018. A funeral ceremony was held in Sant’Eufemia on 13 June.
