= Brescia Due =

Business district in Brescia, Italy

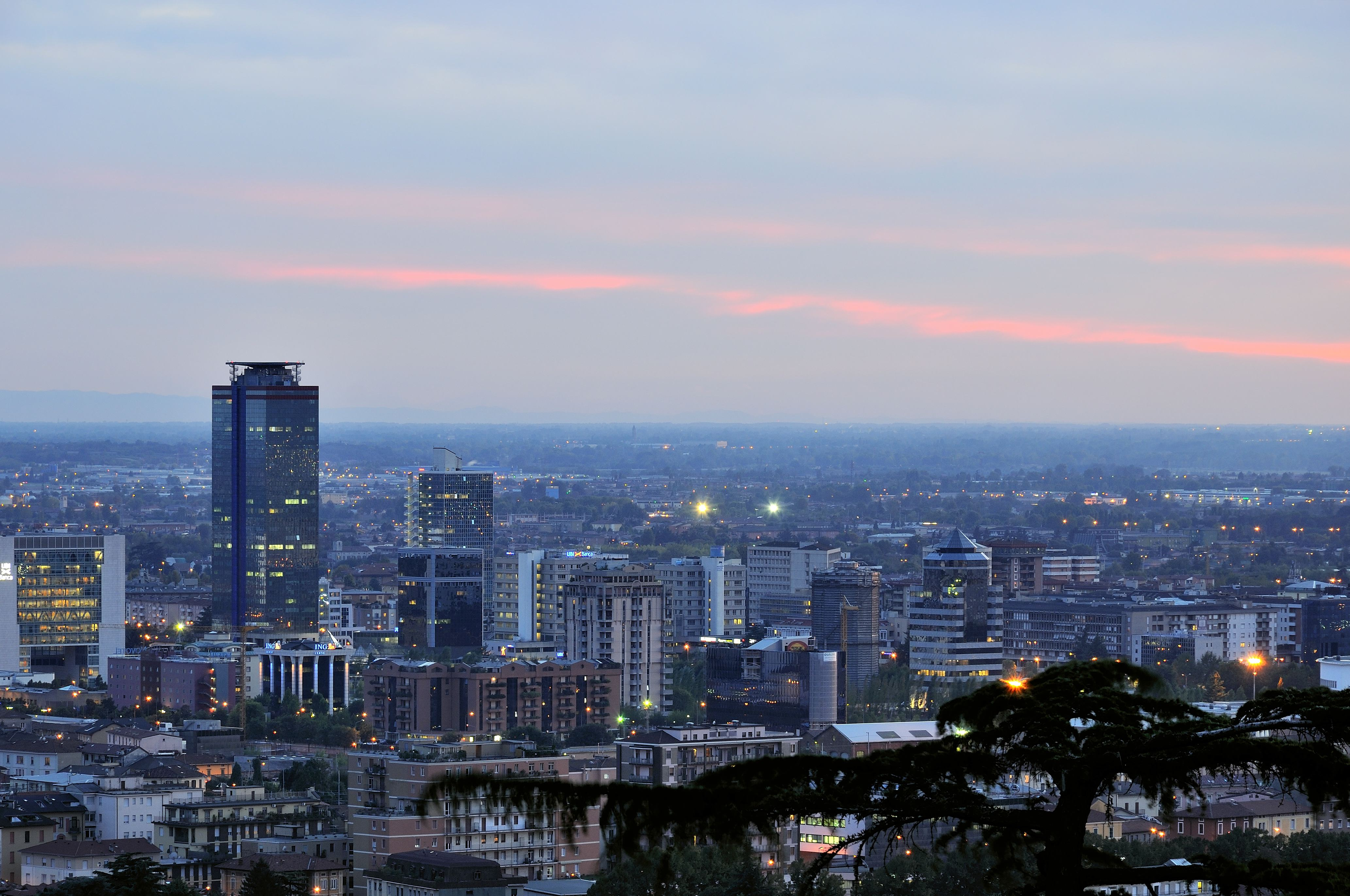
- The skyscrapers of Brescia Due, seen from the mountains
- Interactive map of Brescia Due
- Coordinates: 45.524597°N 10.21246°E
- Country: Italy
- Region: Lombardy
- Province: Brescia
- Comune: Brescia
- Time zone: UTC+1 (CET)
  - Summer (DST): UTC+2 (CEST)

Brescia Due is a business district in Brescia, Italy, part of the Lamarmora administrative division. It is located south of the city centre. Its realization was planned by the city administration to relieve congestion in the city centre by moving business and tertiary activities to the new area.

== History ==
The area in which the business district was built was predominantly rural, characterized by farmhouses and agricultural plots.

In 1954, mayor Bruno Boni began work on the construction of the overpass over the tracks of the Brescia railway station, a work that at the time would have cost almost a billion lire. The overpass was inaugurated on 5 November 1961 in the presence of the then Finance Minister Giuseppe Trabucchi. As a function of the opening of this infrastructure, the General Town Plan of 1961, drawn up under the coordination of the architect Mario Morini, envisaged allocating the area to a "New center of life": a modern business center of the city as opposed to the city centre. The urbanization of the area began in 1969, following the drafting of a detailed plan, and was called "Brescia Due".

During 1972, Brescia Due, being a neighborhood under construction, was involved in the experimentation of ASM district heating. The service was launched in September of the same year and was then extended to the rest of the city in the following decade.

The first skyscraper that came to life in the business district was the "Crystal Palace". Its construction (begun in 1988) was full of controversy: the initial project by architect Bruno Fedrigolli, presented in 1985, envisaged a height of 131 metres (430 ft), which would have made the structure the tallest skyscraper in Italy, exceeding the Pirelli Tower, located in Milan, by four metres (13 ft). The project encountered opposition from the Lombardy Region, which prevailed; the skyscraper, whose construction ended in 1992, thus saw its height reduced to 110 metres (360 ft).

In subsequent years, other skyscrapers were added, including the CAP Tower (1993) and the Kennedy Tower (2004). In addition to the skyscrapers, the offices of Equitalia and UBI Banca have opened here over the years.

== Transport ==
=== Underground ===
The city is served by two underground stations: Lamarmora and Bresciadue.

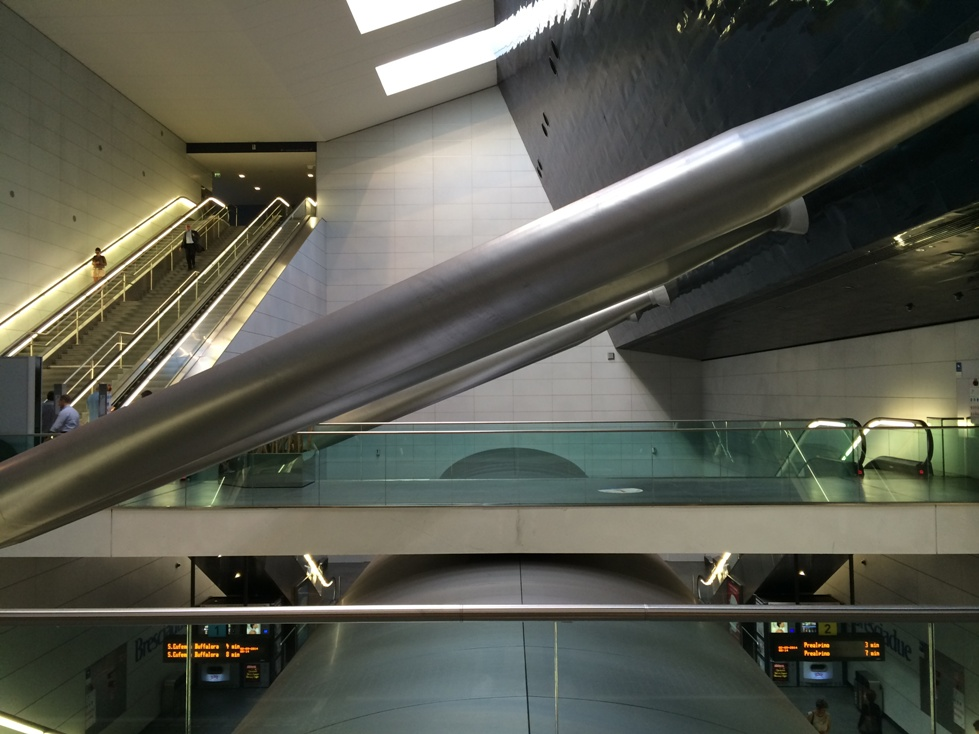
The interior of Bresciadue station

=== Urban bus service ===
The urban bus service serves the area with lines 2, 4, 7, 10, 13, 14 and 15, connected to the rest of the city by the Kennedy overpass.

== Complex ==
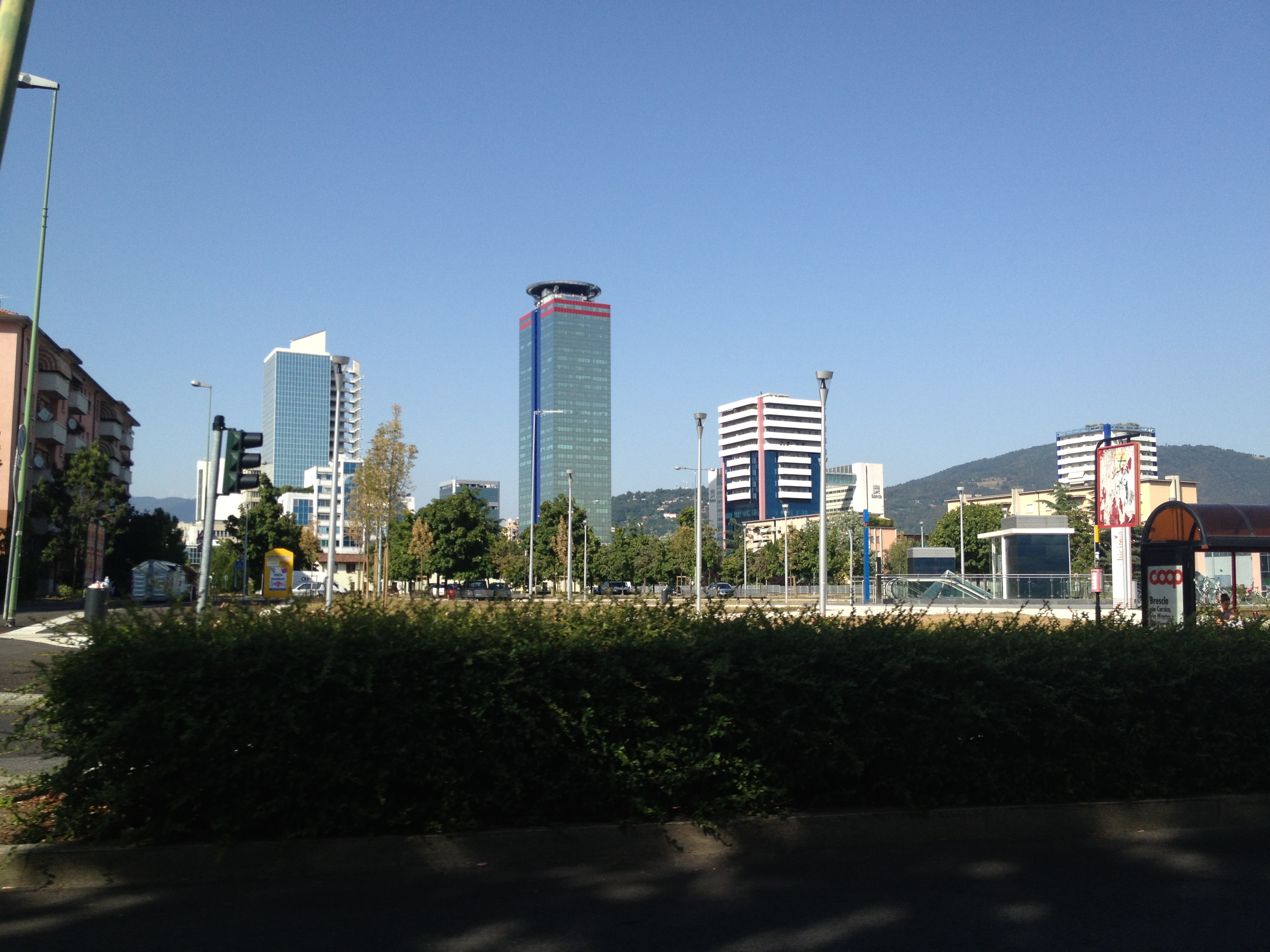
A view of the Brescia Due skyscrapers

| Position | Skyscraper | Height |
|---|---|---|
| 1 | Crystal Palace | 110 m (360 ft) |
| 2 | Cap Tower | 82 m (269 ft) |
| 3 | Complesso Futura | 70 m (230 ft) |
| 4 | Torre Kennedy | 57 m (187 ft) |
| 5 | Torre Giardino | 50 m (160 ft) |
| 6 | Torre Ambrosiana | 50 m (160 ft) |
| 7 | UBI Palace | 50 m (160 ft) |
| 8 | Torre Millenium | 50 m (160 ft) |
| 9 | Torre Oberdan | 46 m (151 ft) |
| 10 | Torre Symbol | 45 m (148 ft) |
