= Luigi Preti =

Italian Democratic Socialist Party politician

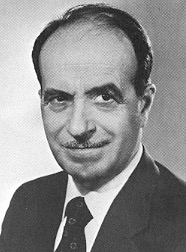

Minister of Transport
- In office 20 March 1979 – 4 April 1980
- Prime Minister: Giulio Andreotti; Francesco Cossiga
- Preceded by: Vittorino Colombo
- Succeeded by: Rino Formica
- In office 7 July 1973 – 23 November 1974
- Prime Minister: Mariano Rumor
- Preceded by: Aldo Bozzi
- Succeeded by: Mario Martinelli

Minister for Public Administration Reform
- In office 4 December 1963 – 21 January 1966
- Prime Minister: Aldo Moro
- Preceded by: Roberto Lucifredi
- Succeeded by: Virginio Bertinelli

Minister of Foreign Trade
- In office 22 February 1962 – 22 June 1963
- Prime Minister: Amintore Fanfani
- Preceded by: Mario Martinelli
- Succeeded by: Giuseppe Trabucchi

Minister of Finance
- In office 18 January 1954 – 19 September 1954
- Prime Minister: Amintore Fanfani
- Preceded by: Giulio Andreotti
- Succeeded by: Paolo Emilio Taviani
- In office 23 February 1966 – 5 June 1968
- Prime Minister: Aldo Moro
- Preceded by: Roberto Tremelloni
- Succeeded by: Mario Ferrari Aggradi
- In office 27 March 1970 – 17 February 1972
- Prime Minister: Mariano Rumor; Emilio Colombo
- Preceded by: Giacinto Bosco
- Succeeded by: Giuseppe Pella

Minister of Budget
- In office 13 December 1968 – 6 August 1969
- Prime Minister: Mariano Rumor
- Preceded by: Mario Ferrari Aggradi
- Succeeded by: Giuseppe Caron

Member of the Chamber of Deputies
- In office 8 May 1948 – 1 July 1987

Member of the Constituent Assembly
- In office 25 June 1946 – 31 January 1948

Personal details
- Born: 23 October 1914 Ferrara, Emilia Romagna, Italy
- Died: 19 January 2009 (aged 94) Bologna, Emilia Romagna, Italy
- Party: PSI (1946–1947); PSDI (1947–1995); SOLE (1995–1996); RSD (1996–2009)
- Spouse: Anna Fabbri
- Children: 3
- Education: University of Ferrara; University of Bologna
- Profession: Politician, lawyer, teacher, journalist

Luigi Preti (23 October 1914 – 19 January 2009) was an Italian politician and member of the Italian Democratic Socialist Party.

== Biography ==
Preti was born in Ferrara. He graduated in law from the University of Ferrara and subsequently in Literature from the University of Bologna.

After completing his studies, he taught history and philosophy in various high schools, and later became a professor of Institutions of Public Law at the University of Ferrara. The didactic activity was alternated with that of journalist and author of historical and legal publications. Preti did not hide his socialist ideas and when, in 1941, he was called to arms, he was denounced to the military court for "lese majesty, defeatism and insubordination". Held in a military prison awaiting trial, he managed to escape the death sentence, thanks to the fall of the regime and the subsequent armistice.

After working in Milan, Preti moved to Switzerland where, in Zurich, he came into contact with Ignazio Silone, who entrusted him with the direction of the periodical "The future of workers".

Returning to Italy at the end of the conflict, in 1946 he was elected provincial secretary of the Italian Socialist Party in Ferrara, and was elected to the municipal council. In June of the same year he was elected deputy to the Constituent Assembly, collecting as many as 20.516 preference votes.

On 12 January 1947 Preti joined the Italian Socialist Workers' Party (later known as the Italian Democratic Socialist Party, or PSDI), of which he was President from 1988 to 1992 and Honorary President from 1992 to 1994.

He was Deputy from 1946 to 1987; he also served as Minister of Finance, for International trade, for Budget, for Public Administration and for Transport.

In 1995 Preti left the PSDI and founded (together with Enrico Ferri) the European Liberal Social Democracy party (SOLE). Opposed to Ferri's decision to bring the SOLE into the Christian Democratic Centre, Preti left the party to found the Movement of Social Democratic Rebirth.

He died in 2009 at the age of 94.
