= European Liberal Social Democracy =

The European Liberal Social Democracy (Italian: Socialdemocrazia Liberale Europea, SOLE), was a social-democratic political party in Italy. It was initially founded as an internal faction of the Italian Democratic Socialist Party on 10 December 1994 by Enrico Ferri and Luigi Preti to defend themselves from attacks within the party. Ferri was forced to resign as secretary after his alliance decision with the centre-right coalition was strongly disputed within the party and causes the PSDI to be suspended by the Socialist International.

In the XXIV congress, held from 28 to 29 January 1995, Gian Franco Schietroma was appointed secretary of the PSDI, which was readmitted into the Socialist International; instead Ferri and Preti decided to left the PSDI and SOLE became an autonomous party, with a collocation in the centre-right coalition. Under the leadership of Ferri, the party began a collaboration with the Christian Democratic Centre (CCD) that was not agreed by Preti, who in turn decided to leave the party to found Social Democratic Rebirth, which instead federated with Forza Italia. SOLE finally dissolved into the CCD during 1996.
