= Riccardo Mastrangeli =

Italian politician

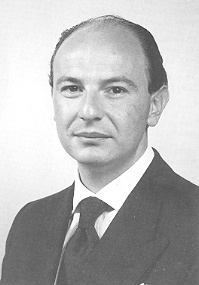
- Riccardo Mastrangeli in 1994.

Mayor of Frosinone
- Incumbent
- Assumed office 29 June 2022
- Preceded by: Nicola Ottaviani

Member of the Chamber of Deputies
- In office 15 April 1994 – 8 May 1996

Personal details
- Born: 20 July 1960 (age 66) Rome, Italy
- Party: Forza Italia (1994-2009); PdL (2009-2013); Forza Italia (since 2013)
- Education: Sapienza University of Rome
- Occupation: Pharmacist

Riccardo Mastrangeli (born 20 July 1960) is an Italian politician, Mayor of Frosinone since 2022.

== Biography ==
Mastrangeli graduated in pharmacy at the Sapienza University of Rome.

He joined Forza Italia in 1994 and was elected to the Chamber of Deputies at the 1994 election

In 1998 he was elected for the first time to the municipal council of Frosinone, while since 2012 he has been councilor for finances and budget. At the 2022 Italian local elections he is the official candidate of the centre-right coalition for the office of mayor of Frosinone. After obtaining 49.26% in the first round, he enters the ballot against the centre-left candidate and former mayor Domenico Marzi and is elected mayor with 55.32% of the votes.

Political offices
| Preceded by Nicola Ottaviani | Mayor of Frosinone since 2022 | Succeeded by Incumbent |
