= Enrico Ferri =

Enrico Ferri may refer to:

- Enrico Ferri (politician) (born 1942), Italian politician and magistrate
- Enrico Ferri (criminologist) (1856–1929), Italian criminologist
