= Domenico Marzi =

Italian politician and lawyer

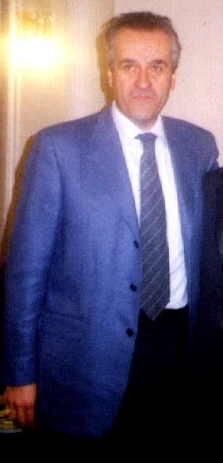

Mayor of Frosinone
- In office 8 June 1998 – 29 May 2007
- Preceded by: Paolo Fanelli
- Succeeded by: Michele Marini

Personal details
- Born: 15 February 1954 (age 72) Frosinone, Lazio, Italy
- Party: Democratic Party
- Education: University of Perugia
- Occupation: lawyer

Domenico Marzi (born 15 February 1954) is an Italian politician and lawyer.

He is currently a member of the Democratic Party. He was born in Frosinone, Italy. He has served as Mayor of Frosinone from 1998 to 2007. He manages a law firm in Frosinone since 1979. He studied in University of Perugia.

== Biography ==
After graduating in Law from the University of Perugia, he has been practicing law in his own law firm in Frosinone since 1979.

In the 1998 local elections, Marzi became the official candidate of the Olive Tree coalition for the office of mayor of Frosinone, winning in the run-off. He was re-elected in the 2002 elections, despite finding himself without a majority in the city council, as the lists supporting his opponent Nicola Ottaviani, backed by the House of Freedoms, exceeded 50% of the votes.

During his nine years as mayor, Marzi focused his energies on resolving issues related to city infrastructure, promoting the construction of sidewalks in commercial districts and the development of the sewer system.

In 2009, Marzi ran for President of the Province of Frosinone, supported by the Union of the Centre (2002) and several civic lists, coming in third behind former Social Democratic leader Gian Franco Schietroma and center-right candidate Antonello Iannarilli, who won the election.

He ran again for mayor in the 2012 municipal elections, supported by Italia dei Valori and the Italian Socialist Party (2007), coming third behind the outgoing mayor (and his successor) Michele Marini and the Popolo della Libertà candidate Nicola Ottaviani, who was subsequently elected.

Since 2015, Marzi has been a member of the Democratic Party (Italy).

Political offices
Preceded by Paolo Fanelli	Mayor of Frosinone; 8 June 1998—29 May 2007	Succeeded by Michele Marini
