= Crystal Palace, Brescia =

Skyscraper in Brescia, Italy

Crystal Palace
- Crystal Palace (Italian)
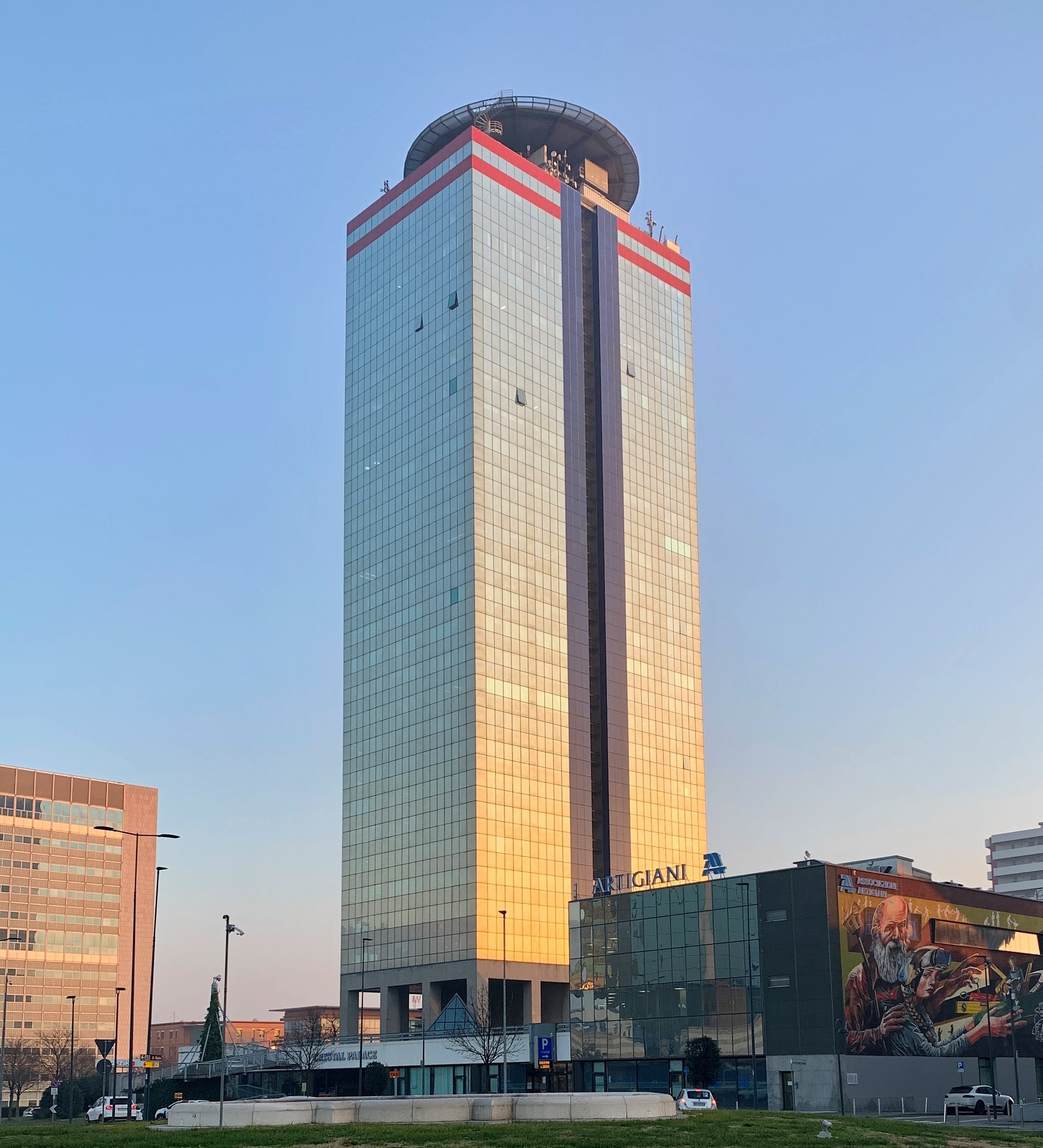
- Interactive map of the Crystal Palace area

General information
- Location: Brescia, Italy
- Coordinates: 45.524597°N 10.215633°E
- Construction started: 1988
- Completed: 1992
- Opened: 26 June 1992

Height
- Roof: 110 m (360 ft)

Technical details
- Floor count: 27+3

Design and construction
- Architect: Bruno Fedrigolli

Crystal Palace is a skyscraper in Brescia.

== History ==
The Crystal Palace was built in 1988–1992 based on a design by architect Bruno Fedrigolli (1921–1995), whose studio was known not only for the importance of the commissioned works but also for the location in the attic of what was the Brescia's first skyscraper in Piazza Vittoria, the Torrione INA.

=== Disputes ===
During the period of its construction, a dispute arose between the Lombardy Region and the Province of Brescia because the skyscraper, according to the project (1985), with 131 metres (430 ft) of height would have exceeded the height record of the Pirelli Skyscraper (at the time the highest in Italy) by approximately 4 metres (13 ft). After a few months the Region issued an order to immediately suspend, until the project had been revised, the construction of the Crystal Palace, which nevertheless remained the tallest skyscraper in Brescia.

This is not the only bureaucratic obstacle in the history of the structure, whose helicopter landing platform, which together with the red band on the penultimate floor characterizes it stylistically, is unfortunately not ENAC compliant with regards to fire extinguishing devices.

== Architecture and design ==
The building is 110 metres (360 ft) high and has 27 floors above ground and 3 underground, the structure is made of reinforced concrete and externally finished with blue glass panels.

On the ground floor it houses a commercial gallery while on the top there is a 600 m^{2} (6,500 ft^{2}) helipad, the east entrance is enriched by an artistic musical fountain, consisting of a large metal structure supporting some bells, which are struck by clappers moved by balance wheels, in turn activated by the fall of water into the spoons placed at the opposite end. The (occasional) operation of the bells is regulated by pistons which free the clappers or block them in such a position as to release them from the movement of the balance wheels. Now, the musical fountain isn't active.

The skyscraper is located in Brescia Due, a business district located south of the city centre.

== See also ==
- List of tallest buildings in Italy
