= Dante Schietroma =

Italian politician (1917–2004)

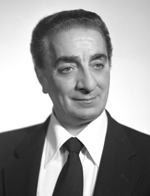
Dante Schietroma

Dante Schietroma (14 October 1917 – 7 September 2004) was an Italian politician. He was a member of the Italian Democratic Socialist Party (PSDI).

His son, Gian Franco Schietroma, also undertook a political career in the PSDI, becoming its national secretary.

== Biography ==
Schietroma was a PSDI Senator for Lazio from 1963 to 1987. He served as Minister for Public Administration in the cabinets led by Prime Ministers Giovanni Spadolini (1981–1982) and Amintore Fanfani (1982–1983).

He was also the municipal councilor of Frosinone from 1956 to 1995, serving as its Mayor from 1988 to 1989.

For six years, from 1988 to 1994, he was a member of the Presidential Council of the Court of Audit.
