= John Woodcock (magistrate) =

Italian prosecutor (born 1967)

Henry John Woodcock
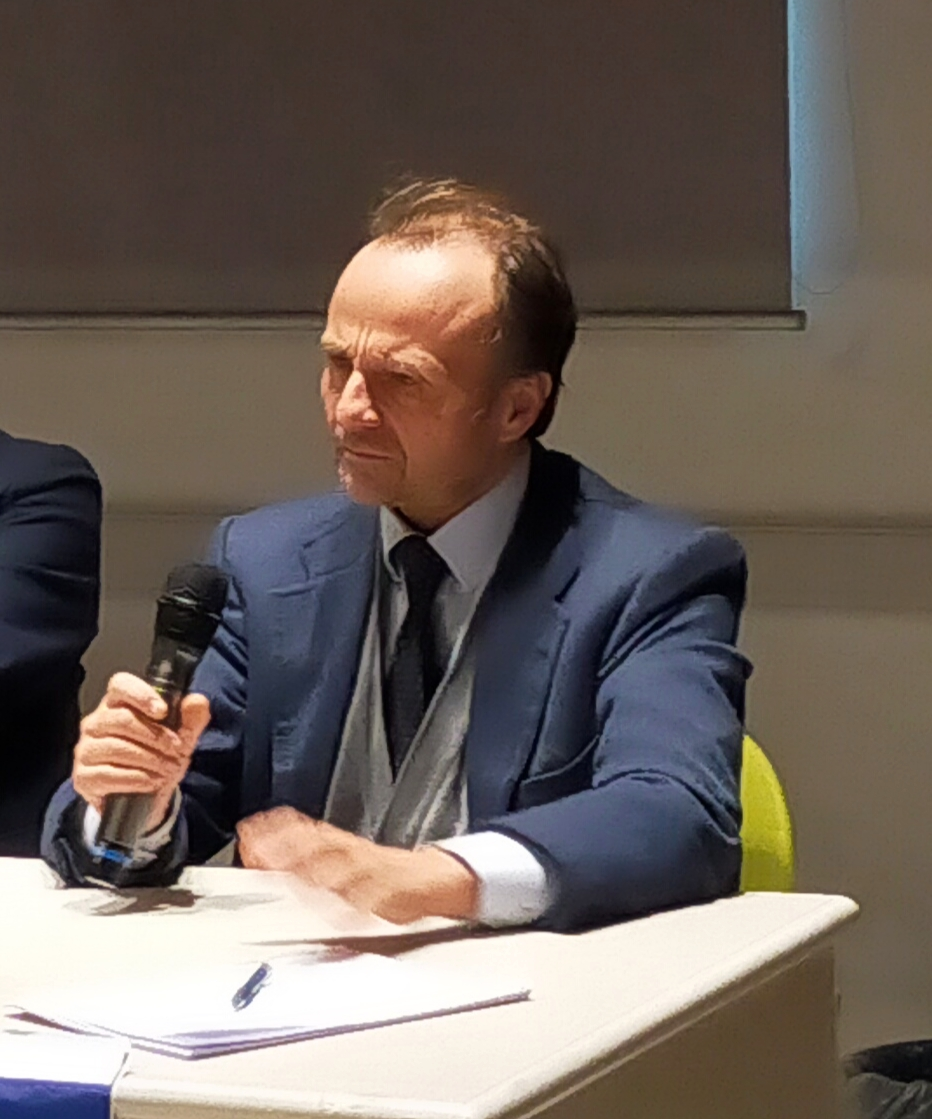
- Woodcock in 2026
- Born: March 23, 1967 (age 59); Taunton, England
- Occupation: Prosecutor
- Known for: Vip Gate; Savoiagate

Henry John Woodcock (born 23 March 1967) is an Italian prosecutor based in Naples.

== Early life and career ==
Woodcock was born on 23 March 1967 in Taunton, Somerset, England. His father George was British and worked as a languages teacher at Livorno's Naval Academy in Northern Italy, and his mother was from the Southern Italian city of Naples in Campania, where Woodcock grew up following his parents' divorce. Woodcock worked in Potenza (the capital of the Italian region of Basilicata) for about ten years where he was a colleague of Luigi De Magistris, a former magistrate who went on to became the mayor of Naples from 2011 to 2021, and they cooperated in anti-mafia investigations. Woodcock moved to Naples in September 2009.

== High-profile prosecutions ==
Woodcock became a prosecutor in 1996 and was noted for his investigations in high-profile scandals, including the Vip Gate in 2003 and Savoiagate in 2006. On 16 June 2006, Woodcock asked for and obtained from the judge of the preliminary investigation an arrest warrant against Vittorio Emanuele, Prince of Naples, of the House of Savoy that ruled the Kingdom of Italy, in Varenna, accusing him of participating in political corruption, forgery, and organisation of prostitution in relation to an investigation of the Casinò di Campione in Campione d'Italia. The arrest was made after wiretaps had been intercepted between Vittorio Emanuele and other suspects during a two-year investigation. Thirteen of 24 people investigated were arrested. Seven of these were jailed, while six were placed under house arrest. Among the other suspects were Salvatore Sottile, the spokesman of former foreign minister Gianfranco Fini and casino managers from Messina, Sicily. Italian television also indicated that Vittorio's cousin Simeon II of Bulgaria, the last Tsar and former prime minister of Bulgaria, was under investigation. Vittorio Emanuele was acquitted in Rome in 2010.

== See also ==
- Trials and allegations involving Silvio Berlusconi
