= List of mayors of Frosinone =

Mayor of Frosinone
- Sindaco di Frosinone

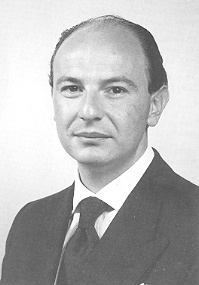
- Incumbent; Riccardo Mastrangeli since 29 June 2022
- Appointer: Popular election
- Term length: 5 years, renewable once
- Formation: 1870
- Website: Official website

The mayor of Frosinone is an elected politician who, along with the Frosinone City Council, is accountable for the strategic government of Frosinone in Lazio, Italy.

The current mayor is Riccardo Mastrangeli (FI), who took office on 29 June 2022.

== Overview ==
According to the Italian Constitution, the mayor of Frosinone is member of the City Council.

The mayor is elected by the population of Frosinone, who also elects the members of the City Council, controlling the mayor's policy guidelines and is able to enforce his resignation by a motion of no confidence. The mayor is entitled to appoint and release the members of his government.

Since 1993 the mayor is elected directly by Frosinone's electorate: in all mayoral elections in Italy in cities with a population higher than 15,000 the voters express a direct choice for the mayor or an indirect choice voting for the party of the candidate's coalition. If no candidate receives at least 50% of votes, the top two candidates go to a second round after two weeks. The election of the City Council is based on a direct choice for the candidate with a preference vote: the candidate with the majority of the preferences is elected. The number of the seats for each party is determined proportionally.

== Kingdom of Italy (1870–1946) ==
The Papal States were annexed to the Kingdom of Italy in 1870 and the first mayor of Frosinone (sindaco di Frosinone), Domenico Diamanti, was appointed by King Victor Emmanuel II in January 1871. From 1889 to 1926 the mayor was elected by the city council. In 1926, the Fascist dictatorship abolished mayors and City councils, replacing them with an authoritarian Podestà chosen by the National Fascist Party. The office of mayor was restored in 1944 during the Allied occupation.

	Mayor	Term start	Term end	Party
1	Domenico Diamanti	January 1871	November 1875	
–	Giovanni Battista Grappelli (acting)	November 1875	3 February 1878	
2	Giovanni Battista Grappelli	3 February 1878	16 January 1882	
3	Cesare Tesori	23 December 1983	May 1886	
(2)	Giovanni Battista Grappelli	15 January 1888	26 September 1906	
4	Domenico Antonio Guglielmi	26 September 1906	22 July 1907	
5	Giacinto Scifelli	22 July 1907	23 July 1910	
6	Leone Vivoli	23 July 1910	21 September 1912	
(5)	Giacinto Scifelli	23 July 1912	21 September 1913	
7	Giulio Lattanzi	29 December 1913	17 November 1914	
8	Alessandro Renna Iannini	17 November 1914	21 August 1915	
9	Giuseppe Ferrante	1916	25 October 1919	
(8)	Alessandro Renna Iannini	25 October 1919	8 November 1919	
–	Ernesto Pellegrini	8 November 1919	5 January 1920	Prefectural Commissioner
–	Domenico Milani	5 January 1920	9 November 1920	Prefectural Commissioner
10	Pietro Gizzi	9 November 1920	17 April 1923	ANI (BN)
Fascist Podestà (1927–1943)
1	Antonio Turriziani	2 January 1927	17 July 1930	PNF
2	Camillo Bracaglia	23 June 1931	20 July 1934	PNF
3	Giuseppe Ferrante	13 September 1935	25 June 1939	PNF
4	Pietro Gizzi	5 March 1940	28 July 1943	PNF
Allied occupation (1944–1946)
11	Domenico Marzi	22 June 1944	13 October 1944	PCI
12	Giacomo De Palma	13 October 1944	11 June 1945	DC
13	Luigi Valchera	11 June 1945	8 April 1946	PSIUP

== Italian Republic (since 1946) ==
=== City Council election (1946-1995) ===
From 1946 to 1995, the Mayor of Frosinone was elected by the City Council.

	Mayor	Term start	Term end	Party
1	Domenico Ferrante	8 April 1946	January 1961	DC
2	Armando Vona	January 1961	April 1964	DC
3	Guido Valchera	April 1964	July 1964	DC
(2)	Armando Vona	July 1964	February 1965	DC
4	Armando Riccardi	February 1965	April 1968	DC
Special Prefectural Commissioner's tenure (April 1968 – July 1969)
5	Dante Spaziani	July 1969	February 1971	DC
6	Paolo Pesci	February 1971	May 1976	DC
7	Ivo Sampaoli	May 1976	December 1976	DC
8	Aldo D'Agostini	December 1976	April 1977	DC
(6)	Paolo Pesci	April 1977	September 1980	DC
(5)	Dante Spaziani	September 1980	August 1986	DC
9	Miranda Certo	August 1986	March 1988	DC
10	Dante Schietroma	29 March 1988	23 October 1989	PSDI
11	Angelo Cristofari	23 October 1989	28 July 1990	DC
12	Giuseppe Marsinano	28 July 1990	12 December 1990	DC
13	Lucio Valle	12 December 1990	27 July 1992	DC
14	Sandro Lunghi	27 July 1992	8 May 1995	DC

=== Direct election (since 1995) ===
Since 1995, under provisions of new local administration law, the Mayor of Frosinone is chosen by direct election, originally every four, then every five years.

	Mayor	Term start	Term end	Party	Coalition	Election
15	Paolo Fanelli	8 May 1995	23 December 1997 (Note: Ousted from office after the majority of the members of the City Council resigned.)	FI	FI • AN • CCD	1995
Special Prefectural Commissioner's tenure (23 December 1997 – 8 June 1998)
16	Domenico Marzi	8 June 1998	11 June 2002	DS	DS • SDI • PPI • FdV	1998
16	Domenico Marzi	11 June 2002	29 May 2007	DS	DS • SDI • DL • FdV	2002
17	Michele Marini	29 May 2007	23 May 2012	PD	DS • SDI • DL • PRC	2007
18	Nicola Ottaviani	23 May 2012	12 June 2017	PdL; FI; Lega	PdL	2012
18	Nicola Ottaviani	12 June 2017	29 June 2022	PdL; FI; Lega	FI • FdI • AP	2017
19	Riccardo Mastrangeli	29 June 2022	Incumbent	FI	FI • FdI • Lega	2022

== Bibliography ==
- Tommaso Baris (2014). C'era una volta la Dc. Intervento pubblico e costruzione del consenso nella Ciociaria andreottiana (1943-1979). Roma: Laterza.
- Santa Pazienza (November–December 2013). "La città dei sindaci". Numero Zero (17).
