= Michele Marini =

Italian politician

Mayor of Frosinone
- In office 29 May 2007 – 23 May 2012
- Preceded by: Domenico Marzi
- Succeeded by: Nicola Ottaviani

Personal details
- Born: March 31, 1961 (age 64) Frosinone, Lazio, Italy
- Party: Christian Democracy (until 1994); Italian People's Party (1994-2002); The Daisy (2002-2007); Democratic Party (since 2007)
- Occupation: employee

Michele Marini (born 31 March 1961) is an Italian politician.

He is member of the Democratic Party and served as mayor of Frosinone from 29 May 2007 to 23 May 2012.

== Biography ==
A city councilor in Frosinone since 1990, first with the Christian Democracy (Italy) and then with the Italian People's Party, he was a councilor from August 1994 to May 1995 and again during the two terms of the Democracy is Freedom – The Daisy from 1998 to 2007, also holding the position of deputy mayor. In 2002, he joined the Margherita party.

In the 2007 local elections, Marini became the official candidate of the Olive Tree coalition for the office of mayor of Frosinone, joining the ranks of the Democratic Party (Italy). On May 28, 2007, he was elected mayor in the first round with 53.3% of the vote and took office the following day. Running for a second term in the 2012 local elections, he reached the runoff against Nicola Ottaviani of the center-right, but was defeated, receiving 46.9% of the votes.

== See also ==
- List of mayors of Frosinone

Political offices
| Preceded by Domenico Marzi | Mayor of Frosinone; 29 May 2007 – 23 May 2012 | Succeeded by Nicola Ottaviani |
