= Carlo Vizzini =

Italian politician (born 1947)

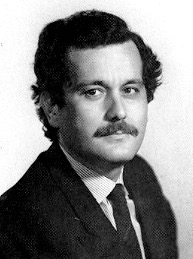
Carlo Vizzini

Carlo Vizzini (born 28 April 1947 in Palermo) is an Italian politician. He was involved in the corruption scandal of Tangentopoli. Vizzini was found guilty but benefited from the statute of limitations and did not serve his sentence.

== Political life ==
Vizzini was secretary of the Italian Democratic Socialist Party (PSDI) from 1992 to 1993, during which time he founded (along with Bettino Craxi of the Italian Socialist Party and Achille Occhetto of the Democratic Party of the Left) the Italian branch of the Party of European Socialists (PES). As a leading PSDI representative he was a minister in several successive governments, including time spent as the Minister for Cultural Assets and Activities (1987–88), as Minister for the Merchant Navy (1989–91), and as Minister of Post and Telecommunications (1991–92). Later, he became a member of the Italian Senate from Sicily for Forza Italia (FI) and latterly The People of Freedom (PdL). Vizzini was a leading member of one of Forza Italia's social-democratic factions, a group known as the Clubs of Reformist Initiative. The faction was succeeded by the social-democratic European Reformists when Forza Italia merged into the PdL.

Vizzini was a member of the Italian Antimafia Commission from 2001–2009. In 2008 he became vice president of the Commission, but relinquished his position in June 2009 after being accused of having been bribed by Massimo Ciancimino, the son of Vito Ciancimino, a former mayor of Palermo who was convicted of being a member of the Mafia. He was then charged with aiding and abetting the Cosa Nostra. Vizzini declared publicly and in judicial proceedings that he did not know Massimo Ciancimino, and on 7 January 2013 the Prosecutor of Palermo formally requested the closing of the investigation opened against him.

In November 2011 Vizzini left the PdL and joined the Italian Socialist Party (PSI). He later returned to the reconstituted PSDI, becoming secretary of the party in May 2022.

== Problems with Italian Justice ==
Vizzini, together with Bettino Craxi and other politicians, was involved in the corruption scandal of Tangentopoli. Vizzini was found guilty but benefited from the statute of limitations and did not serve his sentence.

Political offices
Preceded by Antonio Gullotti	Italian Minister of Culture; 1987–1988	Succeeded by Vincenza Bono Parrino
Party political offices
Preceded by Antonio Cariglia	Secretary of the Italian Democratic Socialist Party; 1992–1993	Succeeded by Enrico Ferri
