= Clubs of Reformist Initiative =

Faction within Forza Italia

The Clubs of Reformist Initiative (Circoli di Iniziativa Riformista) was a social-democratic faction within Forza Italia, a political party in Italy.

Its members were mainly former members of the Italian Democratic Socialist Party (PSDI), a centrist social-democratic party which had been a minor but influential political force in Italy between 1947 and 1994. Its leader was Senator Carlo Vizzini, a former minister and erstwhile leader of the PSDI. The goal of the faction was to unite all members of Forza Italia who came from either that party or the Italian Socialist Party (PSI). When Forza Italia was merged into The People of Freedom in 2009, Vizzini launched European Reformists, a social-democratic think tank, which replaced the Clubs.
