= European Reformists =

Italian think tank

European Reformists (Riformisti Europei, RE) was a social-democratic think tank, which functioned as a faction within The People of Freedom, a political party in Italy.

RE aimed at "promoting the culture of liberal and socialist reformism in the context of a Europe aware of its role in the new international scenarios" and was composed mainly of former members of the Italian Democratic Socialist Party (Carlo Vizzini, president) and the Italian Socialist Party (Anna Bonfrisco, Giampiero Cantoni and others). The group can be considered the continuation of the Clubs of Reformist Initiative, the faction Vizzini headed within Forza Italia.

In November 2011 Vizzini abruptly left the PdL in order to join the new Italian Socialist Party. While leaving the party, Vizzini declared to Corriere della Sera: "It seems to me that the PdL is set to become the Italian section of the European People's Party. I come from another tradition: I have been secretary of the PSDI and I was one of the founders of the Party of European Socialists. When I joined Forza Italia there were Liberals, Socialists, Radicals. Now everything has changed."
