= Italian Democratic Socialist Party (2004) =

Minor political party in Italy

Italian Democratic Socialist Party Partito Socialista Democratico Italiano
- Abbreviation: PSDI
- Secretary: Paolo Preti
- President: Carlo Vizzini
- Founded: 9 January 2004
- Split from: Italian Democratic Socialists
- Headquarters: Via Domenico Cimarosa, 3/b 00198 Rome
- Newspaper: L'Umanità (2018–2020)
- Ideology: Social democracy Social liberalism
- Political position: Centre
- National affiliation: Centre-left coalition (The Union 2006–2008, 2024–present); The People of Freedom (2013); Forza Italia (2018)
- Colours: Red
- Chamber of Deputies: 0 / 400
- Senate: 0 / 200
- European Parliament: 0 / 76
- Regional Councils: 1 / 896

Website
- www.psdi-nazionale.it

The Italian Democratic Socialist Party (Italian: Partito Socialista Democratico Italiano, PSDI) is a minor social-democratic political party in Italy.

It was established in 2004 as the continuation of the historical Italian Democratic Socialist Party, so that the new PSDI numbers its congresses in perfect continuity with the old PSDI. After being part of the centre-left coalition in 2006, the party supported the centre-right coalition, specifically The People of Freedom (PdL), in 2013 and Forza Italia, PdL's successor, in 2018. The PSDI, which later returned into the centre-left's fold, retains some support locally in the South, especially in Apulia and Campania. Its current leaders are Paolo Preti and Carlo Vizzini.

== History ==
=== Re-foundation ===
At the end of 2003, several former members of the PSDI, who initially converged in the Italian Democratic Socialists, reorganized the Italian Democratic Socialist Party. In January 2004, the XXIV National Congress of the PSDI was held. Giogio Carta was named new secretary and Antonio Cariglia was named honorary president of the party. The legal continuity of the party was sanctioned by the Court of Cassation in 2004.

In the 2005 regional election in Apulia the party ran in a joint list with two minor parties, winning 2.2% of the vote and obtaining one regional councillor. The party did not repeat this in the 2010 Apulian regional election, when it was not able to file a list.

=== Legal dispute and split ===
In the 2006 general election, the party was part of the centre-left coalition and Carta was elected to the Chamber of Deputies. He thus resigned as secretary in November and was replaced by Renato D'Andria, whose election was contested by many members of the party (including Carta) on the basis that it was rigged. The new secretary consequently ousted all the members who contested his election (including Carta) from the party.

In April 2007, a tribunal in Rome sided with the former leadership and declared invalid both the election of D'Andria as secretary and the 17th congress of the party, which confirmed him as leader in January. The party was led ad interim by Carta until the Congress of October 2007 (the 17th, as that of January was declared invalid) elected Mimmo Magistro as new secretary. D'Andria, who continued to consider himself to be the legitimate leader of the PSDI, launched in June his "Party of Democratic Reformers" (PRD), open to "socialists, Christians, radicals, liberals, republicans and greens".

=== 2008 general election and failed recomposition ===
For the 2008 general election, the PSDI tried to form an alliance with the Union of the Centre (UDC); in the end, it did not participate with the UDC coalition. On 29 March 2008, the National Committee proposed to its members and voters to vote according to their conscience, favouring those political forces that could stop the emerging two-party system. Most regional sections, on the example of Tuscany, indicated to vote for the Socialist Party in the election of the Chamber of Deputies and for The Left – The Rainbow in the election of the Senate of the Republic. Some regional sections made different indications, notably in Veneto and Lazio in favour of the UDC, in Lombardy in favour of the PdL, and in Sicily in favour of the Movement for Autonomy.

In July 2011, a tribunal in Rome declared D'Andria as the legitimate secretary of the party. Magistro proposed a reconciliation between the two factions, but D'Andria did not accept the conditions proposed by Magistro. In November 2011, 28 members out of 31 of the outgoing national council, including Magistro, left the PSDI in order to form a new party named The Social Democrats (iSD). On 11 January 2012, on the 65th anniversary of the split of Palazzo Barberini, the PSDI and iSD organized a joint event in remembrance of Saragat. A recomposition was made difficult by the fact that D'Andria was keen on an alliance with the centre-right (three MPs of PdL, namely Massimo Baldini, Giancarlo Lehner and Paolo Russo, were close to the new PSDI and two of them had been members of the old PSDI), while Magistro had aligned the iSD with the centre-left.

=== Recent developments ===
In the 2013 general election, the PSDI supported the PdL. In the run-up of the 2018 general election, the PSDI decided to side with the centre-right Forza Italia (FI), successor of the PdL.

In 2022, Carlo Vizzini, a former leader of the historical PSDI and later senator of Forza Italia, was elected secretary of the party. The PSDI did not contest the 2022 general election. According to a faction, the party logo was not deposited at the Ministry of the Interior due to uncertainties about its legitimacy, while the iSD would be the continuation of the historical party. Moreover, a third group, led by Mario Calì, also claimed to be the legitimate heir of the old PSDI, participated in the election within Civic Commitment and would be joined by Magistro as president. Also in 2022, Magistro was proposed to become the leader of Social Democracy, a new project to refound PSDI and later became honorary chairman of that party.

In December 2023 Paolo Preti replaced as secretary Vizzini, who was appointed president.

In the 2024 European Parliament election the PSDI supported Action, especially the candidates put forward by the Liberal Socialist Association led by Oreste Pastorelli. Successively, the party established a political pact with Social Democracy, another re-edition of the PSDI launched in 2022 and heir of iSD. In the 2025 regional elections the PSDI supported centre-left candidates, starting from the Calabrian regional election, sometimes participating in joint lists. In the 2025 Campania regional election the party elected one regional councillor.

== Leadership ==
- Secretary: Giorgio Carta (2004–2007), Mimmo Magistro (2007–2011), Renato D'Andria (2011–2022), Carlo Vizzini (2022–2023), Paolo Preti (2023–present)
- President: Alberto Tomassini (2007–2010), Angelo Scavone (2010–2011), Carlo Vizzini (2023–present)
- Honorary president: Antonio Cariglia (2005–2006), Giorgio Carta (2007–2008)
