= Gian Franco Schietroma =

Italian politician and lawyer

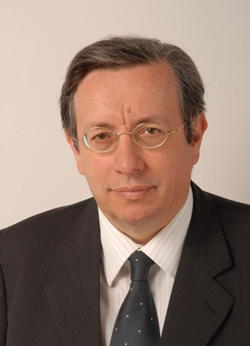

Member of the Chamber of Deputies
- In office 9 May 1996 – 29 May 2001
- In office 28 April 2006 – 28 April 2008

Secretary of the Italian Democratic Socialist Party
- In office 29 January 1995 – 10 May 1998
- Preceded by: Enrico Ferri
- Succeeded by: Abolished office

Personal details
- Born: 19 October 1950 (age 75) Rome, Italy
- Party: PSDI (1990–1998); SDI (1998–2007); PSI (2007–present)
- Education: Sapienza University of Rome
- Profession: Politician, Supreme Court lawyer

Gian Franco Schietroma (born 19 October 1950 in Rome) is an Italian politician and lawyer. He is the son of the former Senator and Minister of Public Function Dante Schietroma.

== Biography ==
Gian Franco Schietroma graduated in law, with 110/110 cum laude, from the "La Sapienza" University of Rome. He worked as a lawyer and in the 1990-1991 period he was President of the Lawyers' order of Frosinone. He was honorary Deputy Praetor of Frosinone from 1980 to 1989.

In 1990 he was elected to the Regional Council of Lazio and served as Regional Assessor for Public Works and subsequently for Culture, while from 1995 to 1998 he was municipal councillor of Frosinone.

On 29 January 1995 Schietroma was appointed Secretary of the Italian Democratic Socialist Party; he held the office until 1998, when the PSDI joined the Italian Democratic Socialists along with the Italian Socialists.

In the 1996 general election he was elected Deputy; in that legislature he served as Undersecretary for Finance in the D'Alema I Cabinet and for Interior in the Amato II Cabinet.

On 16 July 2002 Schietroma was elected by the Parliament, meeting in joint session, lay member of the Superior Council of the Magistracy; he left office in 2006, to return to political activity.

In 2006 he was re-elected Deputy among the ranks of the Rose in the Fist. In 2007 he joined the new Socialist Party and in 2014 he became its National Secretariat Coordinator.

| Preceded by Enrico Ferri | Secretary of the Italian Democratic Socialist Party; 1995–1998 | Position abolished Party merged with the Italian Socialists |
