= Marano Marchesato =

- Comune
- Comune di Marano Marchesato
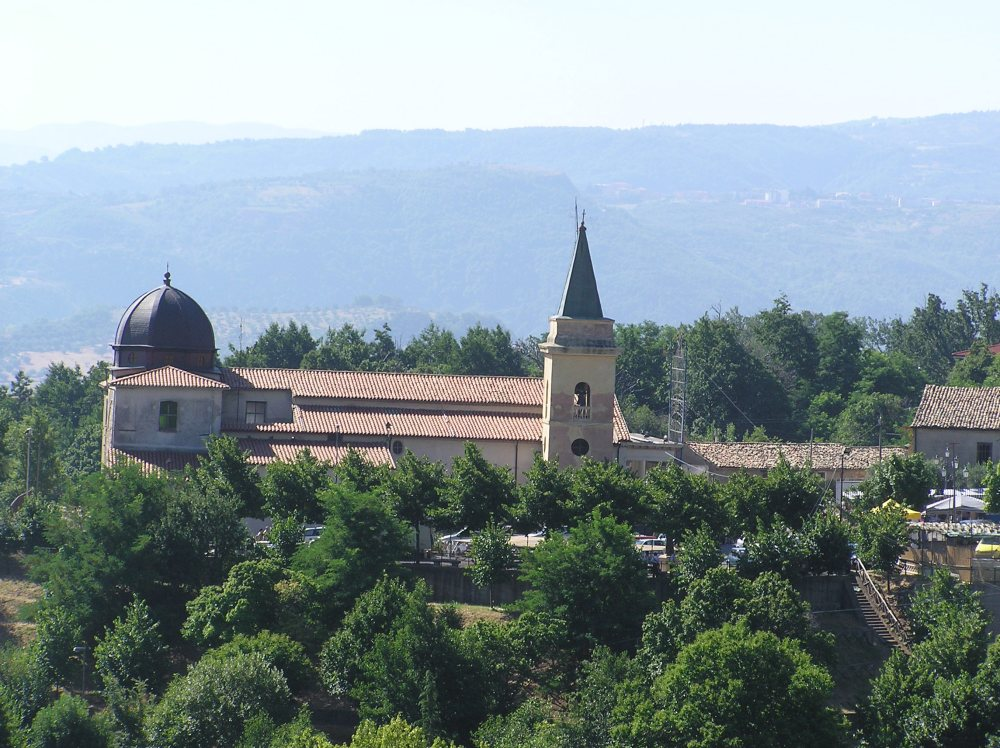
- The Church of Our Lady of Mount Carmel in Marano Marchesato

- Location within Italy Location within Calabria
- Coordinates: 39°19′N 16°10′E
- Country: Italy
- Region: Calabria
- Province: Cosenza (CS)

Government
  - Mayor: Edoardo Vivacqua

Area
  - Total: 5.04 km^{2} (1.95 sq mi)
- Elevation: 550 m (1,800 ft)

Population (2007)
  - Total: 3,065
  - Density: 608/km^{2} (1,580/sq mi)
- Demonym: Maranesi
- Time zone: UTC+1 (CET)
  - Summer (DST): UTC+2 (CEST)
- Postal code: 87040
- Dialing code: 0984
- ISTAT code: 078076
- Patron saint: Madonna del Carmine
- Saint day: 15 July
- Website: Official website

Marano Marchesato is a town and comune in the province of Cosenza in the Calabria region of southern Italy.

The origins of the town's name are widely disputed. One claim is that the name derives from the medieval Marano family, who, throughout the course of the Saracen occupation of the nearby emirate of Amantea, provided refuge to those fleeing the Muslim conquest. A second hypothesis is that Marano refers to the Spanish word "marrano", a derogatory term given to Iberian Jews who had converted to Christianity before the Spanish Inquisition. Many of these early converts, or "conversos", fled to southern Italy given the region's climate and linguistic similarity. This theory is furthered by the existence of a thriving silk trade in the town's history.
