= Nicola Ottaviani =

Italian politician and lawyer

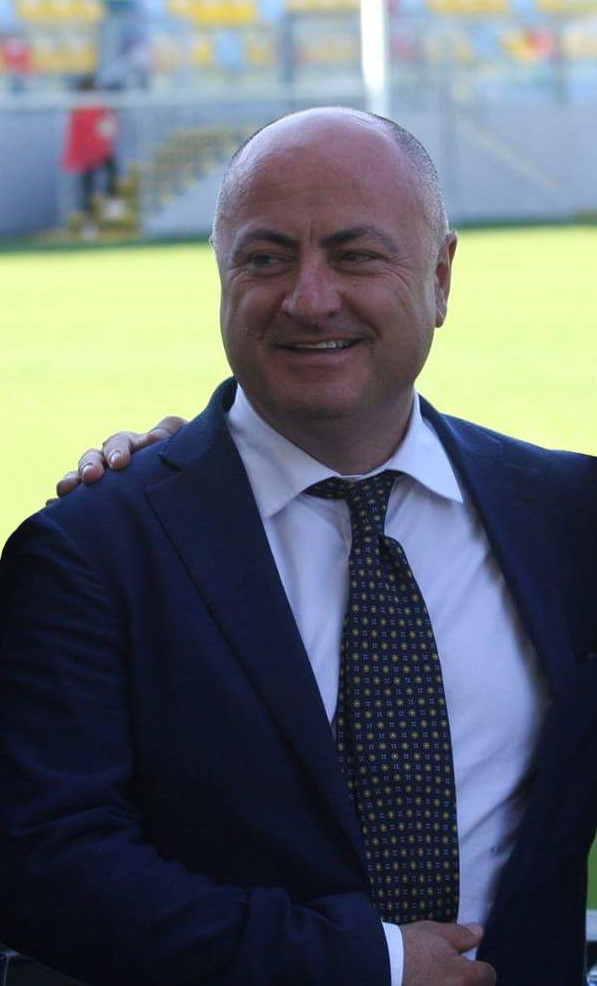
- Nicola Ottaviani in 2017

Member of the Chamber of Deputies
- Incumbent
- Assumed office 13 October 2022
- Constituency: Terracina

Mayor of Frosinone
- In office 23 May 2012 – 29 June 2022
- Preceded by: Michele Marini
- Succeeded by: Riccardo Mastrangeli

Personal details
- Born: 21 July 1968 (age 58) Frosinone, Italy
- Party: DC (till 1994); RI (1996-2002); Forza Italia (2002-2009); PdL (2009-2013); Forza Italia (2013-2019); Lega Nord (since 2019)
- Education: Luiss Guido Carli
- Occupation: lawyer

Nicola Ottaviani (born 21 July 1968) is an Italian lawyer and politician.

He is member of the Lega Nord party. He was born in Frosinone, Italy. He served as Mayor of Frosinone from 2012 to 2022. In October 2022, Ottaviani wad elected to the Chamber of Deputies.

Political offices
Preceded by Michele Marini	Mayor of Frosinone; 2012-2022	Succeeded by Riccardo Mastrangeli
