= Giorgio Carta (politician) =

Italian doctor and politician (1938–2020)

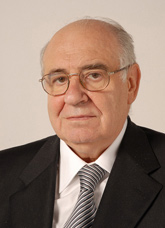

Member of the Chamber of Deputies
- In office 23 April 1992 – 14 April 1994
- In office 28 April 2006 – 28 April 2008

Personal details
- Born: 16 January 1938 Jerzu, Italy
- Died: 28 October 2020 (aged 82) Cagliari, Italy
- Party: PSDI (until 1998); SDI (1998–2004); PSDI (since 2004)
- Profession: Politician, doctor

Giorgio Carta (16 January 1938 – 28 October 2020) was an Italian doctor and politician.

== Biography ==
Giorgio Carta was born in Jerzu. He graduated in medicine in 1964 and obtained three specialist qualifications: cardiology, gastroenterology and occupational medicine. He published 19 scientific papers, achieving national accreditation certificates as a primary cardiologist. He worked as a sports doctor and professor of medicine applied to sport; from 1983 he was also a journalist.

He was a member of the PSDI National Directorate, as manager of the Health and Social Assistance sector. He served as Sardinian regional councillor for thirteen years (1979−92), as regional minister for Labor, Tourism and the Environment. He was also municipal councilor of Cagliari from 1970 to 1979, and, for the same city, he served as municipal health minister (1970−71), deputy Mayor and minister of the annona in 1973.

He was elected to the Chamber of Deputies in the 1992 general election with 13,753 votes. In 1992 he was appointed Undersecretary for the Merchant Navy in the Amato government; subsequently, in 1993, he was appointed Undersecretary for Finance in the government led by Carlo Azeglio Ciampi.

Subsequently, the PSDI temporarily disappeared from the Italian political scene, merging into the Italian Democratic Socialists (1998). However, in 2004, he reconstituted himself in the PSDI, celebrating its XXV congress, and was appointed its national secretary.

In the 2006 general elections he was elected deputy among the ranks of the Olive Tree list. In the Chamber of Deputies he joined the unitary parliamentary group of the Olive Tree until August 2007, when he joined the mixed group.

After the fall of the Prodi government in 2008, he was one of the two MPs who claimed to belong to the Workers' Communist Party. However, this union was only formal and temporary, since it was aimed exclusively at relieving the Workers' Communist Party of the obligation of collecting signatures.

In 2007 he was elected as honorary president of the PSDI, leaving the office of secretary.

Carta died on 28 October 2020 at the age of 82.
