= Italians in the World =

Italians in the World Italiani nel Mondo
- Leader: Sergio De Gregorio
- Founded: September 2006
- Dissolved: 29 March 2009
- Merged into: The People of Freedom
- Ideology: Promotion of Italy's and Italians' image in the world
- Political position: Centre

Website
- Sergio De Gregorio's blog

Italians in the World (Italian: Italiani nel Mondo, InM) was a political party in Italy, founded in September 2006 by Senator Sergio De Gregorio, a former Socialist elected in the lists of Italy of Values. The party had previously existed as a political association since 2000. The party has merged with The People of Freedom in 2009.
