= Enrico Ferri (politician) =

Italian politician and magistrate (1942–2020)

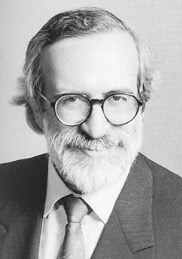

Minister of Public Works
- In office 13 April 1988 – 22 July 1989
- Prime Minister: Ciriaco De Mita
- Preceded by: Emilio De Rose
- Succeeded by: Giovanni Prandini

Secretary of the Italian Democratic Socialist Party
- In office 30 April 1993 – 29 January 1995
- Preceded by: Carlo Vizzini
- Succeeded by: Gian Franco Schietroma

Member of the Chamber of Deputies
- In office 23 April 1992 – 14 April 1994

Personal details
- Born: 17 February 1942 La Spezia, Italy
- Died: 17 December 2020 (aged 78) Pontremoli, Italy
- Party: PSDI (1987–1995); SOLE (1995–1996); CCD (1996–1998); UDR (1998–1999); FI (1999–2006); UDEUR (2006–2013)
- Children: 4
- Education: University of Florence
- Profession: Politician, magistrate

Enrico Ferri (17 February 1942 – 17 December 2020) was an Italian politician and magistrate.

== Biography ==
Graduated in law at the University of Florence in 1966, Ferri has been a magistrate since 1970 and since 1971 a praetor in Pontremoli. He was a member of the Superior Council of the Judiciary from 1976 to 1981, when he became National Secretary of the Independent Judiciary (1981−1987).

From 1988 to 1989 he served as Minister of Public Works in the De Mita Cabinet and is known for having set the limit of 110 km/h on the highway. In 1989 he was elected MEP for the PSDI and in 1992 he was elected Deputy in the National Parliament. In 1990 he was also elected Mayor of Pontremoli (he held office until 2004). On 30 April 1993 he was appointed Secretary of the PSDI. In 1994 he was newly elected MEP for his party. In 1995 he was also re-elected Mayor of Pontremoli, with the support of Forza Italia and National Alliance. This led to further fractures within the party and the official expulsion by the Socialist International and the Party of European Socialists, to which the PSDI and Ferri adhered. Ferri was thus forced to leave the party secretariat. On 10 December 1994, together with Luigi Preti, he founded the European Liberal Social Democracy (SOLE). In January 1995 a PSDI congress definitively put the current of Ferri and Preti into the minority, appointing Gian Franco Schietroma as party secretary. In 1995 the SOLE movement became an autonomous party and approached the centre-right area, forging a privileged collaboration with the Christian Democratic Centre. Luigi Preti, not in favor of this choice, detached himself from the SOLE by creating the Movement for the Social Democratic Rebirth, a political subject federated with Forza Italia.

At the 1996 general elections, Ferri was a candidate on the White Flower lists, without however being elected. In 1998 Ferri left the CCD (of which he became vice president in 1997–1998) and followed Clemente Mastella into the Democratic Union for the Republic (UDR) of Francesco Cossiga. However he soon left the party to join Forza Italia in 1999, resuming relations with Luigi Preti. In the 1999 European Parliament elections he ran with Forza Italia and was elected MEP, where he remained until 2004.

On the occasion of the 2006 general elections, he returned to the centre-left area, joining the Union of Democrats for Europe of Clemente Mastella, but he was not elected. So he returned to the judiciary as Deputy Prosecutor General of the Cassation. With the appointment of Mastella as Minister of Justice, he was appointed head of the International Activities Coordination Office (UCAI) at the same Ministry of Justice, a position he held until the fall of the Prodi government in January 2008.

== Personal life ==
Enrico Ferri was the father of four children. The eldest son, Filippo, was head of the Florence Police mobile team, before being definitively sentenced to three years and eight months for the violence in the Diaz school in 2001 during the G8 in Genoa; the second son, Jacopo, has been a regional councillor in Tuscany for Forza Italia; the third son, Cosimo Maria Ferri, is a former Undersecretary and a parliamentary Deputy for the Democratic Party; the daughter, Camilla, works as a pharmacist at the San Raffaele Hospital in Milan.

Ferri died on 17 December 2020 after a long illness.

Preceded by Carlo Vizzini	Secretary of the Italian Democratic Socialist Party; 1993–1995	Succeeded by Gian Franco Schietroma
