= Sergio De Gregorio (politician) =

Italian politician and journalist (born 1960)

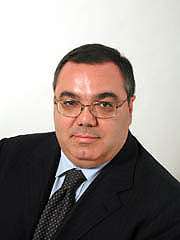

Member of the Senate of the Republic
- In office 28 April 2006 – 14 March 2013

Personal details
- Born: 16 September 1960 (age 65) Naples, Italy
- Party: PSI (until 1994); FI (1994–2005); DCA (2005–2006); IdV (2006); InM (2006–2009); PdL (2009–2013)
- Profession: Politician, journalist

Sergio De Gregorio (born 16 September 1960) is an Italian politician and journalist who was a member of the Senate of the Republic from 2006 to 2013.

== Early life ==
De Gregorio was born on 16 September 1960 in Naples. He began his career as a journalist at the age of 17 in 1977, collaborating until 1980 with the Chronicle Editorial of Naples of Paese Sera. Subsequently, he also worked for radio and television. In December 1996, he became the first director of L'Avanti! by Valter Lavitola (not to be confused with the historic socialist newspaper Avanti!). He remained the director of the newspaper until 2005. In 2000, he founded the Italians in the World association with the aim of spreading and promoting the image of Italy and Italians in the world, including through its own satellite television channel, Italians in the World Channel.

== Political career ==
De Gregorio was a parliamentary assistant at the European Parliament until 2004. In 2005, after the failure of an agreement with Forza Italia, he ran for regional elections in Campania on the list of Gianfranco Rotondi, the Christian Democracy for Autonomies. In 2005, Italians in the World became a political movement and reached an agreement with the Italy of Values for the 2006 Italian general election. In April 2006, De Gregorio was elected to the Senate on the Italy of Values (IdV) list. On 7 June, he was elected president of the Defence Commission thanks to an agreement with the House of Freedoms reached directly with the mediation of the Senate group leader of Forza Italia, Renato Schifani, in contrast to the candidate of The Union, the ex-partisan Lidia Menapace. The vote of De Gregorio himself, who by voting himself with the senators of the House of Freedoms had put in crisis the majority of The Union, was crucial.

On 25 September 2006, after further controversy following his abstention during the vote of an indult order, De Gregorio announced his definitive exit from IdV and from the centre-left coalition majority, subsequently voting against the second Prodi government's confidence during the crisis of February 2007. In September 2007, De Gregorio officially returned to the centre-right coalition, signing a federative pact between his movement and Forza Italia. On 24 January 2008, he voted for the motion of no confidence against the Prodi government, contributing to its fall.

In the 2008 Italian general election, De Gregorio was elected to the Senate of the Republic on The People of Freedom list. Member of the Defence Commission and also president of the Italian Parliamentary Delegation to the Parliamentary Assembly of NATO, a post from which he self-suspended on 14 April 2012 in reference to the judicial proceeding that saw him investigated on the alleged misappropriation of €20 million of funding to the newspaper L'Avanti!

== Judicial proceedings ==
In June 2007, De Gregorio was put under investigation by the Naples Anti-Mafia Prosecutor for the crimes of laundering and abetting the Camorra. On 25 February 2008, he was entered in the register of suspects of the Public Prosecutor of Rome for the crime of corruption. Both investigations were born in Campania, where the Guardia di Finanza discovered a series of checks signed or filmed by De Gregorio. On 8 April 2008, he was entered in the register of suspects of the Reggio Calabria district Anti-Mafia Prosecutor's Office for external competition in association with mafia-type crimes aimed at recycling. On 8 May 2009, the investigating judge of Reggio Calabria issued the decree concerning the case.

On 15 February 2012, De Gregorio was investigated for fraud and false invoicing within the scope of the investigation into loans to the daily newspaper L'Avanti! together with the director Valter Lavitola. According to the indictment, Lavitola "as the de facto owner and co-director of the International Press" company that managed the newspaper and De Gregorio "as effective shareholder since 1997 and co-director of the same company", showed that that the publisher of the L'Avanti! possessed the legal requirements to obtain the contributions provided for by the law for publishing: a total of €23 million and €200,000 received from 1997 to 2009 including false assumptions. On 16 April 2012, a precautionary custody order was issued under house arrest against him by the Prosecutor's Office of Naples, again with reference to the misappropriation of €20 million in loans to the daily newspaper L'Avanti!

De Gregorio was accused of having been bribed with €3 million for his passage to the centre-right coalition in 2007. For this reason, Silvio Berlusconi was investigated for concussion in February 2013. On 11 March 2013, speaking with journalists about his involvement in the investigation into the alleged sale of the senators, De Gregorio publicly admitted that he took €2 million in black and therefore committed a crime. On 9 May 2013, the Naples Public Prosecutor asked for Berlusconi's trial for the alleged sale of the senators. A similar request was made for De Gregorio and Lavitola. On 8 July 2015, Berlusconi and Lavitola were sentenced to 3 years in prison.
