= Giuseppe Trabucchi =

Italian lawyer and politician (1904–1975)

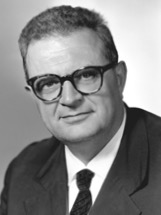

Minister of Finance
- In office March 1960 – June 1960
- Prime Minister: Fernando Tambroni

Minister of Finance
- In office July 1960 – February 1962
- Prime Minister: Amintore Fanfani
- Preceded by: Himself

Personal details
- Born: 29 June 1904 Verona
- Died: 1975 (aged 70–71)
- Party: Christian Democracy
- Education: University of Padua

Giuseppe Trabucchi (1904–1975) was an Italian lawyer and politician. He was a member of the Christian Democrats and served as the minister of finance between 1960 and 1962.

== Early life and education ==
Trabucchi was born in Verona on 29 June 1904. His family founded a law firm in Verona in 1875. His brother, Alberto, was also a lawyer and would become the mayor of Illasi. Their grandfather, Alessandro Trabucchi, was an officer in the Italian army during both world wars and a soldier of the partisan resistance in Piedmont after the signing of the armistice.

He received a degree in law from the University of Padua.

== Career ==
Trabucchi served as the senator for the Christian Democracy in the 2nd and 3rd legislatures. He was appointed minister of finance to the Tambroni cabinet in March 1960 and was in office until July 1960 when the term of the cabinet ended. He also held the same office in the third and fourth cabinets of Amintore Fanfani (July 1960- February 1962 and in February 1962, respectively).

In the mid-1960s Trabucchi was accused by public prosecutor of Rome of involving in two bribery incidents, but the parliamentary commission did not provide the necessary authorization to proceed.
