= Landulfids =

The Landulfids or Atenulfings were a noble family of Lombardic origin in the ninth through eleventh centuries. They were descended from Landulf I of Capua, whose own ancestry is unknown and who died in 843. The dynasty produced a line of princes which ruled most of southern Italy at one time or another and even one pope, Victor III.

In 839, a civil war broke out in the Principality of Benevento. Landulf of Capua supported Siconulf in the war and when the Emperor Louis II forced a division of the principality on the claimants in 849, Capua was assigned to the Principality of Salerno. But Landulf's heirs aimed to make themselves independent of any princely authority. By 860–861 this task was essentially complete and Capua was independent county.

== Genealogy ==
- Landulf I the Old (died 843), Gastald of Capua
  - Lando I (died 860), Count of Capua
    - Lando II (died 884), Count of Capua
  - Pando the Rapacious (died 862), Count of Capua
    - Pandenulf (died 882), Count of Capua
    - Landenulf, Bishop of Capua
  - Landulf II (died 879), Bishop and Count of Capua
  - Landenulf, Count of Teano
    - Lando III (died 885), Count of Capua
    - Landenulf I (died 887), Count of Capua
    - Atenulf I the Great (died 910), Prince of Capua and Benevento
      - Landulf III Antipater (died 943), Prince of Capua and Benevento
        - Atenulf III (died 943), Prince of Capua and Benevento
        - Landulf IV the Red (died 961), Prince of Capua and Benevento
          - Pandulf I Ironhead (died 981), Prince of Capua, Benevento, and Salerno and Duke of Spoleto and Camerino
            - Landulf VI (died 982), Prince of Capua and Benevento
            - Pandulf II (died 982), Prince of Salerno
            - Landenulf II (died 993), Prince of Capua
            - Laidulf (died 999), Prince of Capua
            - Atenulf (died 982)
          - John, Archbishop of Capua
          - Landulf V (died 968), Prince of Capua and Benevento
            - Landulf VII di Sant'Agata (died 1007), Prince of Capua
              - Pandulf II the Black (died 1022), Prince of Capua
            - Pandulf II the Old (died 1014), Prince of Capua and Benevento
              - Pandulf IV the Wolf (died 1050), Prince of Capua
                - Landulf VIII, Prince of Capua
                - Pandulf VI Gualo (died 1057), Prince of Capua
                  - Adelgrima, married Rainald, Count of the Marsi
                - Maria, married Atenulf I of Gaeta
                - Sikelgaita of Capua, married Lando of Aquino (brother of Atenulf I of Gaeta)
              - Landulf V (died 1033), Prince of Benevento
                - Pandulf III (died 1059), Prince of Benevento
                  - Landulf VI (died 1077), Prince of Benevento
                    - Pandulf IV (died 1073), Prince of Benevento
                - Atenulf
              - Atenulf, Abbot of Montecassino
              - Maria, married Sergius III of Amalfi
              - Gaitelgrima, married Guaimar III of Salerno
      - Atenulf II (died 941), Prince of Capua and Benevento
        - Landulf, Count of Conza
          - Guaimar, Count of the Marsi
          - Indulf, Count of Sarni
          - Landulf
          - Landenulf (died 971), Count of Lauris
            - Landulf
        - Gaitelgrima, married Guaimar II of Salerno

== Sources ==
- Stasser, Thierry. "Où sont les femmes? Prosopographie des femmes des familles princières et ducales en Italie méridionale depuis la chute du royaume lombard (774) jusqu’à l’installation des Normands (env. 1100)." Prosopon: The Journal of Prosopography, 2006.
