= Pandulf of Capua =

Pandulf of Capua may refer to:

== Princes of Capua ==
- Pandulf Ironhead (d. 981), Pandulf I of Capua
- Pandulf III of Capua (d. 1014)
- Pandulf II of Capua (d. aft. 1016)
- Pandulf IV of Capua (d. 1049/50)
- Pandulf V of Capua (d. aft. 1027)
- Pandulf VI of Capua (d. 1057)

== Other ==
- Pandulf of Capua (monk) (d. aft. 1081)
