= Landulf =

Landulf or Landulph, Italian Landolfo and Latin Landolfus, Landulphus, etc., is a masculine given name of Germanic (possibly Lombardic) origin. It may refer to:

== Landulf ==
- Landulf I of Benevento
- Landulf II of Benevento
- Landulf III of Benevento
- Landulf IV of Benevento
- Landulf V of Benevento
- Landulf VI of Benevento
- Landulf I of Capua
- Landulf II of Capua
- Landulf III of Capua
- Landulf IV of Capua
- Landulf V of Capua, see Landulf III of Benevento
- Landulf VI of Capua, see Landulf IV of Benevento
- Landulf VII of Capua
- Landulf VIII of Capua
- Landulf II (archbishop of Benevento)
- Landulf of Carcano
- Landulf of Conza
- Landulf of Gaeta
- Landulf of Milan
- Landulf of Yariglia
- Landulf Junior

== Landolfo or Landolfus ==
- Landolfo Brancaccio (died 1312), Neapolitan aristocrat and Catholic cardinal
- Landolfo Caracciolo (died 1351), Neapolitan Franciscan theologian, diplomat and prelate
- Landolfo Maramaldo (1381–1415), a cardinal-deacon of San Nicola in Carcere, a titular church in Rome
- Landolfus Sagax or Landolfo Sagace, 11th century Langobard historian

== See also ==
- Landulph, a town in England
- Landulfids, a dynasty named after a Landulf
- Landolfi, an Italian surname
- Pompeo Landulfo (after 1567–1627), Italian painter
