= Principality of Capua =

Medieval Lombard and Norman state in Southern Italy

Coordinates: 41.1667°N 14.2833°E

Principality of Capua Principatus Capuae (Latin)
- 861–1156
- The Principality of Capua shown within Italy in 1000
- Status: Originally part of the Duchies of Benevento and Salerno, vassal states of the Lombard Kingdom
- Capital: Capua
- Government: Monarchy
- Prince
  - 887–910: Atenulf I (first)
  - 1127–1156: Robert II (last)
- Historical era: Middle Ages
  - After Pando's proclamation, Capua acts independently: 861
  - Atenulf is victorious in a war of succession and becomes the Prince of Capua: 887
  - Atenulf declares Capua and Benevento inseparable and introduced the principle of co-rule: 899
  - Richard of Aversa conquers Capua: 1058
  - Roger II, the Count of Sicily claims overlordship of Capua: 1127
  - The Normans defeat Pope Innocent. Roger II becomes King of Sicily, Duke of Apulia, and Prince of Capua: 1156
Preceded by	Succeeded by
Principality of Salerno	Kingdom of Sicily
- Today part of: Italy

The Principality of Capua (Latin: Principatus Capuae or Capue, Modern Italian: Principato di Capua) was a state centred on Capua in Southern Italy which lasted for about three centuries. Towards the end of the 10th century the Principality reached its apogee, occupying most of the Terra di Lavoro area. It was originally a gastaldate, then a county, within the principality of Salerno. Under the Sicilian monarchy, the former principality remained one of the two chief mainland components of royal rule alongside Apulia, and twelfth-century sources often identified its territory as the Terra di Lavoro.

== Origins ==
Old Capua was an ancient Italian city, the greatest Roman city of the south. It was the centre of Lombard gastaldate in the duchy of Benevento, although little is known of this part of its history. It first enters history as a Lombard state under Landulf the Old with the assassination of the Beneventan duke Sicard in 839. Landulf and his sons were partisans of Siconulf of Salerno. In 841, Capua was sacked and completely destroyed by Saracens in the pay of Radelchis I of Benevento. Landulf and his eldest son, Lando I, took the initiative in fortifying the nearby hill of Triflisco on which was built "New Capua": the Capua of today.

A civil war between Benevento and Salerno ensues. In 849, Emperor Louis II ends the civil war by decreeing that Benevento be split into two distinct principates - Benevento and Salerno. In 851, as a part of the Divisio of Louis II, Capua is included as a part of Salerno.

In 861, Pando the Rapacious declared Capua independent of Salerno. On his death in the following year, the succession to the county was thrown into dispute. His son was deposed by Bishop Landulf who thus united the ecclesiastical and secular rule of the region as Athanasius was to do near-contemporaneously in Naples. Disputes over the bishopric and the countship befell Capua on Landulf's death and a civil war enveloped the principality between Pandenulf, the earlier deposed son of Pando, and Lando III, another grandson of Landulf I. Salerno allied with Lando and Benevento with Pandenulf. A succession crisis followed in 887 and Atenulf I established himself and his princely status with the aid of the aforementioned Athanasius of Naples. Atenulf would try to avert future succession crises and to vindicate the independent pretensions of Capua à la those of Benevento and Salerno.

== Union with Benevento ==
In 899, Atenulf defeated Radelchis II and conquered Benevento. He declared Capua and Benevento inseparable and introduced the principle of co-rule, whereby sons would be associated with their fathers and brothers with each other, a principle soon borrowed by Salerno. Atenulf associated his son, Landulf, as co-prince and built up alliances with the local Greek states, like Naples and Gaeta, which alliances were continued under his successor.

Atenulf also began planning the eventual reconquest of Muslim-occupied territory in the region, but died before his plans came to fruition at the Battle of the Garigliano in 915. Landulf mostly continued the policies of his father and spent most of his career after Garigliano trying to weaken the Byzantine authority in Apulia and the Campania. In this, he was only moderately successful. His son, Landulf II, allied against the Lombard principality of Salerno, but failed to oust Gisulf I. Like his father, he attacked Byzantine possessions, but was defeated and forced to submit to nominal Byzantine suzerainty.

Under Landulf's sons, the union of Capua and Benevento broke down although they remained legally bound. During this time, Pandulf Ironhead ruled separately in Capua while Landulf III ruled in Benevento. Langobardia minor was unified one last time, however, when Pandulf usurped his brother's share from his nephew on Landulf's death in 969 and became Prince of Salerno in 978. Before his death in 981, Pandulf gained the title of Duke of Spoleto from Emperor Otto I. Afterward, Pandulf split his dominion between his sons, Landulf IV receiving Benevento-Capua and Pandulf II receiving Salerno.

Shortly thereafter, Benevento and Capua split legally, with Landulf IV keeping a Capua much reduced in power. In the 990s, Capua experienced debilitating turmoil as one prince was assassinated, another deposed by the Emperor Otto III, and a third deposed by the citizens.

== 11th century ==
The old dynasty was reinstalled in 1000 under Landulf VII, who made his brother, Pandulf II of Benevento, regent for his heir, Pandulf II of Capua. Thus, Capua and Benevento were briefly united for the last time.

The chief interest of Lombard Capua in this, its declining period, was the control of a seaport, especially a large and important one, such as Gaeta or Naples. Capua experienced a new zenith under Pandulf IV, who was deposed twice between his succession in 1016 and his death in 1050. He was originally an ally of the Byzantines and remained allied with them against all his neighbours until the end. His reign was occupied by constant disputes with the church, whose bishops and abbots he treated with disdain, and with the coastal duchies of Naples, Gaeta, and Amalfi. He desired to give Capua a seaport and deposed both Sergius IV of Naples and John V of Gaeta. His personal character, however, soon involved him in a war with Guaimar IV of Salerno, who had him deposed by the Holy Roman Emperor, and took his principalities. Despite the importance of Capua in the region, the city declined under Pandulf's successors until it was eventually taken by the Norman allies of Guaimar.

== Norman rule ==
In 1058, a year after the death of Pandulf's weak successor, the Norman count Richard of Aversa conquered Capua, but left the city itself in the control of Landulf VIII for another four years. Richard immediately increased his prestige with the princely title and his power by the territory which came under his authority. He became a neighbour of the popes and was both their protector and supporter and also an enemy who spent his last years in excommunication, as did his son and successor, Jordan I, who carved out a chunk of papal territory for the principality. At Richard's death, his family, the Drengot, had a prestige and power to match that of the Hauteville family, but they acted in a different sphere of influence: the Papal States and central Italy primarily.

With the death of Jordan I, the principality declined fast. From 1090 to 1098, the city of Capua itself was in the hands of Lando, a Lombard count who was raised by the citizens in opposition to the young Richard II. The latter was only reinstalled with the aid of his fellow Normans and thus Capua became dependent on the Hautevilles and their duchy, though the princes continued to try and influence papal elections and act as papal protectors. Yet princely rule in Norman Capua rested on a broader aristocratic landscape than the succession of princes alone suggests. Cadet branches of the Drengot family remained important through the counts of Caiazzo and Carinola, while older Lombard comital lines such as the counts of Aquino also survived into the early twelfth century. With the death of the religious Jordan II in 1127, the principality became the object of desire of Roger II, who in 1130 united the Sicilian and peninsular domains of his family into the Kingdom of Sicily. Robert II's resistance to Roger II thus formed part not simply of a dynastic conflict, but of a wider struggle over how Capuan aristocratic power would be subordinated and rearranged within the new kingdom. One of the last important Drengot survivors, Jonathan of Carinola, was restored as a count under the new monarchy, illustrating the selective survival and political reuse of the old princely milieu.

More than a decade of constant war followed thereafter between the Normans and the Lombard principalities, the Papal States, and the Holy Roman Empire. Ultimately during the summer of 1139, Pope Innocent II invaded the kingdom of Sicily with a large army. On 22 July 1139, at Galluccio, Pope Innocent was captured by Roger's son, Roger III. Days later, by means of the Treaty of Mignano, the pope proclaimed Roger II rex Siciliae ducatus Apuliae et principatus Capuae (King of Sicily, Duke of Apulia and Prince of Capua). In the decades that followed, the former principality continued to structure mainland politics as the Terra di Lavoro, and royal rule there increasingly relied on the rearrangement of counties and on military coordination with local aristocrats, including the royal comestabuli.

== See also ==
- List of princes of Capua
