= Aloara =

Aloara of Capua (died 992), was a princess consort of Capua from the 960s to 981, and then co-regent of Capua jointly with her son from 982 until 992. She was said to have governed her states with great ability.

== Life ==
She married Pandulf Ironhead, prince of Capua and Benevento. Her husband died at Capua in 981, leaving five sons by Aloara; Landulf IV, prince of Capua and Benevento; Pandulf, prince of Salerno; Atenulf, entitled count and also marquis, perhaps of Camerino; Landenulf, prince of Capua; and Laidulf who succeeded him.

Landulf IV perished in battle fighting for the emperor, in 982, against the Greeks and Saracens. His brother Landenulf succeeded him; but, being very young, Otto I invested him with the principality of Capua, so that Aloara might govern during her life conjointly with him. This decree was also confirmed by Theophanu, widow of Otto, and regent, during the minority of Otto III. Aloara began to reign in 982. She governed with much wisdom and courage.

Landenulf was assassinated by a plot of his own relations, in 993; and his brother Laidulf, who succeeded, was deposed by the emperor Otto III, in 999, for having a hand in the death of his brother.

Baronius relates that Saint Nilus the Younger foretold to her, as a punishment for the murder of her husband's nephew (whom she had just put to death for fear he should interfere with her son's rights), that her offspring should not reign in Capua—a prophecy that was justified by the event.

== Bibliography ==
- Henry Gardiner Adams, ed. (1857). "Aloara" . A Cyclopaedia of Female Biography: 32. Wikidata Q115617429 – via Wikisource.
