= Hugh of Tuscany =

Margrave of Tuscany from 969 to 1001

Hugh
- Margrave of Tuscany
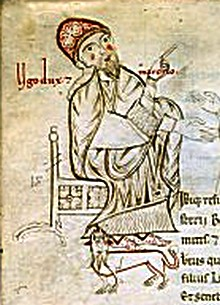
- A later medieval miniature of Duke Hugh (the words Ugo dux appear in red to the left)
- Predecessor: Hubert
- Successor: Boniface III
- Born: 953
- Died: 21 December 1001 (aged 47–48)
- Buried: Badia Fiorentina
- Spouse: Judith
- Father: Hubert
- Mother: Willa
- Memorials: In the Badia Fiorentina

Hugh (Latin: Ugo, Hugo; 953/4 – 21 December 1001), called the Great, was the Margrave of Tuscany from 969 (Note: Wickham places the start of his reign in 969, but other sources give 961.) until his death in 1001, and the Duke of Spoleto and Margrave of Camerino from 989 to 996 (as "Hugh II"). (Note: Cilento dates Hugh's rule of Spoleto to 987) He was known for his restoration of the state apparatus in Tuscany (Note: The march of Tuscany, or Tuscia in Latin, corresponds to the north and centre of modern Toscana.) after decades of neglect from various Margraves, whose main interests lay elsewhere. Hugh was also noted for his support of the new Ottonian dynasty (in Italy since 961), and has been praised for his justice by the contemporary theologian Peter Damian in his De principis officio (On the Office of a Prince). Hugh's rule has also been remembered for its close cooperation with the Papal States in the resolution of territorial disputes and his generosity in gifting marchesal (public) lands for the foundation of monasteries of the Catholic Church.

== Background ==
Hugh was the son and successor of Hubert, an illegitimate son of King Hugh. His mother was Willa, a daughter of Boniface I, Duke of Spoleto and Margrave of Camerino. The Tuscany that Hugh inherited was not yet characterised by incastellamento (except in the diocese of Lucca) and royal intervention was rare. It was also larger in area than it had been under the last margrave unaffiliated with the royal family, Adalbert II (died 915). The march was defined less by geography than by the public institutions controlled by the margrave. Hugh had his own tribunals, mints and army, and the lands he distributed to the church in his march was mostly public land. The basis of Hugh's power was the wealthy cities of the Arno valley, although he also possessed extensive landed properties.

Towards the end of his life he increasingly dissipated marchesal (public) lands on the foundation of monasteries. The increase in gift-giving to monasteries by Hugh and his vassals (fideles) has been linked to a "spiritual revival". Hugh gave lands around Arezzo to the Guidi clan, a family he patronised. He also gave some to the churches of the city, acts confirmed later by the emperors Otto III and Henry II. Hugh supported Otto III in his ecclesiastical reforms and against Venice, to whose duke, Pietro IV Candiano, he was related.

== Territorial disputes ==
In 996, Otto placed the eight Adriatic counties (Note: The disputed counties, granted to the papacy by Otto's grandfather in 962, were Pesaro, Fano, Senigallia, Ancona, Fossombrone, Cagli, Jesi and Osimo.) disputed between him and the papacy under the joint control of Hugh and Margrave Conrad of Ivrea, also Duke of Spoleto and Camerino, although he also left a missus to oversee the courts and finances. In a letter dated 5 August 996 Otto tells Pope Gregory V that "we are leaving the foremost men of Italy as aid and comfort to you—Hugh of Tuscany, faithful to us in everything, and Conrad...", and goes on to assure him he would receive "the works and services due" him in the disputed territory.

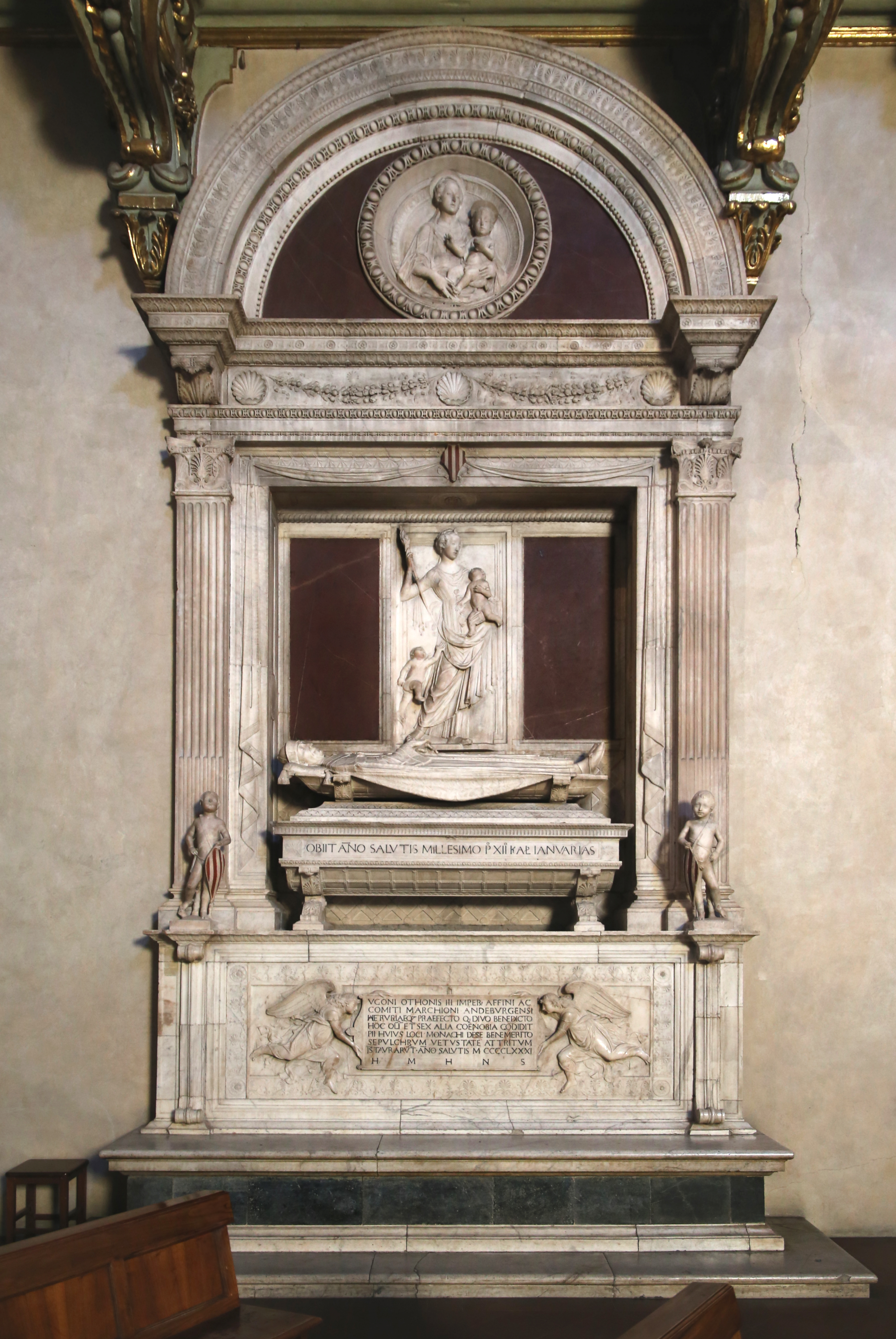
Mino da Fiesole's monument to Hugh in the Badia Fiorentina (completed 1481–82)

Hugh took an interest in the affairs of Bobbio, a monastery in disarray, and a correspondence with its abbot in self-imposed exile, Gerbert of Aurillac. Hugh seems also to have been on familiar terms with abbot Guarin of Cuxà. Gerbert wrote Hugh a letter dated 1 August 896. (Note: The short letter addressed "to margrave Hugh" reads: "Not without reason do we hold you in the highest esteem, exalting you and your followers with vows and praises, for you, though so busy, deem it worth while to have remembered me. This we value especially, therefore and hence with the utmost confidence in you, we pray the more earnestly that your memory of us may not be destroyed. We are pouring forth such prayers as we, absent, are able that you may relieve the present exhausted circumstances of Saint Columban.") Hugh and Conrad of Ivrea apparently requested the Empress Theophanu to come to Italy to set matters straight at Bobbio. When Gerbert later became pope as Sylvester II, he summoned a synod at Rome on 13 January 1001, at which Hugh was present along with Duke of Bavaria, the future Henry II.

In 992, Aloara, the widow of Pandulf Ironhead, who had been regent of the Principality of Capua since her husband's death, died. A revolt broke out at Capua, which under Pandulf had recognised imperial authority, and Prince Landenulf II was assassinated. Hugh, whose job it was as ruler of Spoleto to maintain the link between the south Italian principalities and the empire, intervened to place Pandulf's youngest son, Laidulf on the Capuan throne and quell the revolt.

== Death and legacy ==
Upon Hugh's death at Pistoia in 1001, his state collapsed. In 1004, war broke out between Lucca and Pisa. The power of the House of Canossa, margraves from 1027 until 1115, barely extended beyond their own lands, and they did not control the cities. Hugh left no children by his wife Judith. He was buried in the Badia Fiorentina, which his mother had founded in 978, where a monument was later added by Mino da Fiesole.

Hugh is still commemorated annually by the monks on 21 December, the feast of Saint Thomas. Hugh's life became surrounded by legends and he was remembered by Placido Puccinelli in the 17th century as a moral and pious prince. His tomb was said to be the site of celestial visions. The Tuscan poet Dante Alighieri, in Paradiso XVI, 127–30, calls Hugh a "great baron":

Ciascun che della bella insegna porta del gran barone il cui nome e il cui pregio la festa di Tommaso riconforta, da esso ebbe milizia e privilegio;	Each one that bears the beautiful escutcheon Of the great Baron, whose renown and name The festival of Thomas keepeth fresh Knighthood and privilege from him received; (Note: The translation is H. W. Longfellow's.)

Italian nobility
Preceded by Hubert	Margrave of Tuscany; 969–1001	Succeeded by Boniface III
Preceded by Thrasimund IV	Duke of Spoleto; 989–996	Succeeded by Conrad
