= Pandulf II =

Pandulf II is the name of:

- Pandulf II of Salerno, the prince of Salerno (981), the second of such princes of the family of the princes of Capua
- Pandulf II of Benevento, the prince of Benevento from 981 and prince of Capua (as Pandulf III) from 1008 or 1009 to his death
- Pandulf II of Capua (aka the Black (Niger) or the Young), son and successor of Landulf VII of Capua in 1007
