= Atenulf (abbot of Montecassino) =

Atenulf (died 30 March 1022) was the Abbot of Montecassino from 1011 until his death. He was a cousin of Prince Pandulf II of Capua, a younger son of Prince Pandulf III and brother of Prince Pandulf IV.

== Abbacy ==
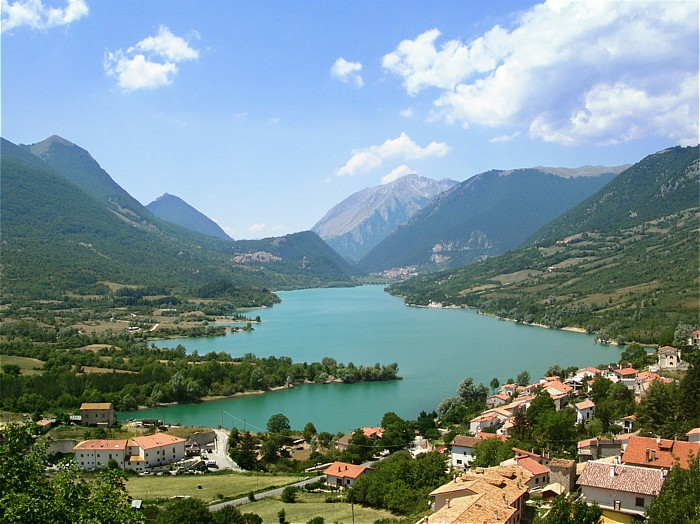
Land and mountains of Barrea

In 999, Atenulf was given as a hostage to Duke Ademar of Spoleto after the latter raided the Principality of Capua on behalf of the Emperor Otto III. Ademar sent his hostage back to Germany. Atenulf's stay in Germany seems to have left an impression: German architectural influence is evident in the buildings he erected while abbot. He was elected abbot in 1011, and in 1014 he received a diploma from the recently crowned Emperor Henry II. On 13 March 1014, he received a privilege listing the lands of Montecassino from Pope Benedict VIII.

On 5 May 1017, Princes Pandulf II and Pandulf IV granted the "church, fortified villa and castle" (ecclesia et castrum et oppidum) of Civita di Sant'Urbano to Atenulf. On 10 May, they granted the land, mountain and church of Sant'Angelo in Barrea to Atenulf, who commissioned Prior Azzo to restore it, since it had escaped destruction during Muslims raids a century earlier and was still the home of a few monks.

On 13 July 1019 or 1020, Atenulf received a second diploma from Henry II, confirming the abbey's possession of Sant'Urbano and Vicalvi. In August and October 1017, Atenulf acquired shares in the churches of Santa Maria and Sant'Apollinare in Casalpiano. In January 1020, two abbots, Peter and Paul, gave Atenulf the monastery of Saint Benedict in the diocese of Trivento, founded in February 1002, along with two churches, Santa Lucia and Santa Maria de Cruce. In May 1022, Magipertus of Aquino and his wife, Anna, gave to Atenulf the region called Limata between the Liri and the town of San Giovanni Incarico and the church of San Lorenzo in the town of Aquino.

Under Atenulf, the Cassinese monk Adam acquired the neglected church of San Nazario sul Melfa. Its rebuilding was credited to Adam by the historian Leo of Ostia, but on 12 April 1032 Pandulf IV and his son, Pandulf VI, confirmed the church to the abbey and granted it a mill by the Melfa because it had been rebuilt by Pandulf's brother.

Later, when Atenulf fled Montecassino, he took several charters with him. One of the charters he took, granting Monte Asprano by Roccasecca to the abbey, was rescued and is extant. Prior to the rule of Atenulf, the library of Montecassino was small and there was little copying of manuscripts. Under him, the scriptorium grew and books were copied in the distinct Beneventan script. His abbacy thus begins the "golden age" of Cassinese history, and especially of its library.

== Politics ==
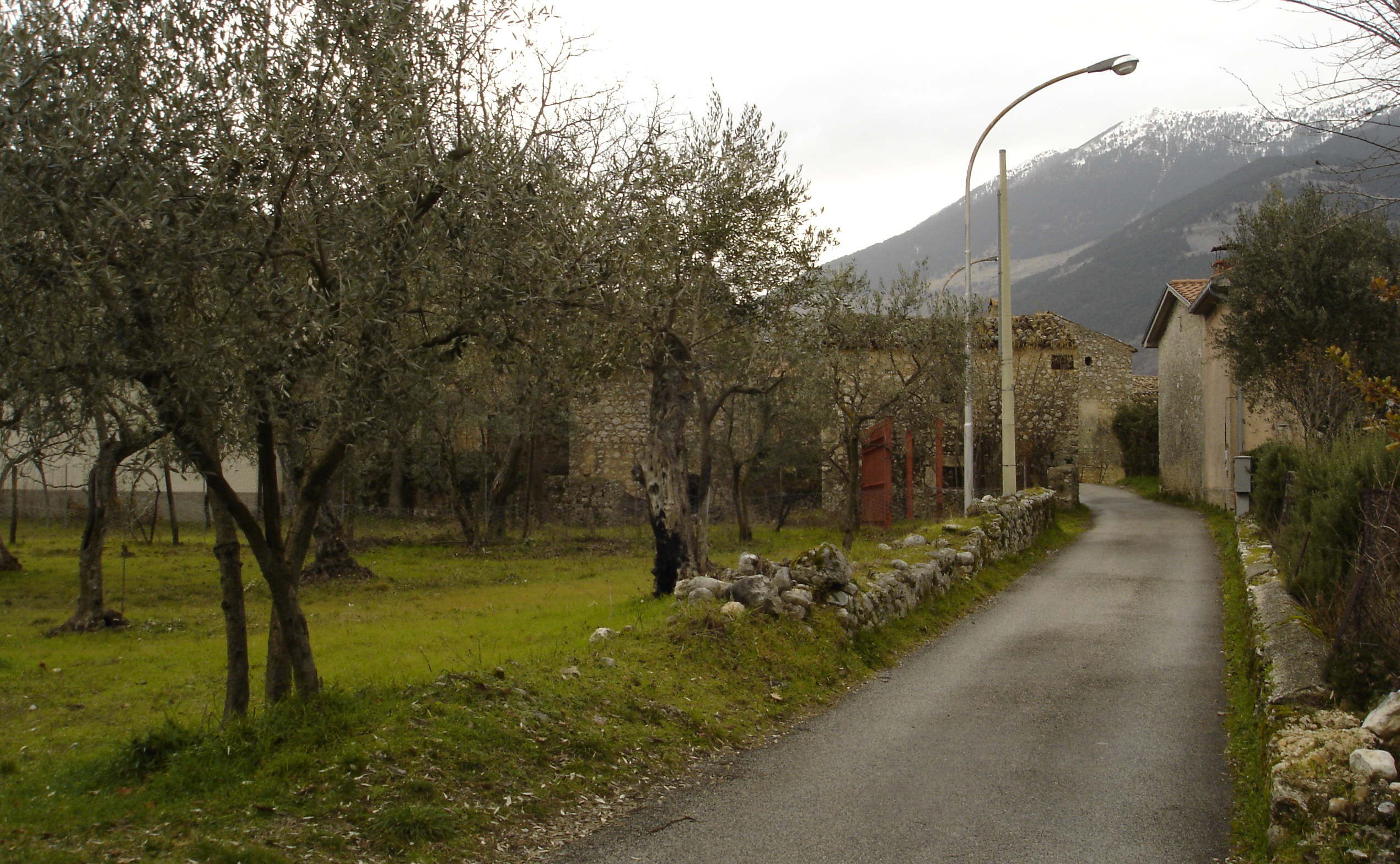
Remains of the fortified villa of Sant'Urbano

In February 1018, he received a privilege from the Byzantine catepan of Italy, Basil Boioannes, confirming all the abbey's properties in the region of Apulia, which was then under Byzantine control. This privilege was granted on order from the Emperor Basil II and was probably designed to draw the abbot and his brother away from their support for the Apulian rebel Melus of Bari.

After the Byzantine victory over Melus at the Battle of Canne in October 1018, some eighty Norman mercenaries escaped and entered the service of the Lombard princes and of the abbot of Montecassino. Atenulf stationed some of the Normans in the castle (oppidum) of Pignataro Interamna in order to ward off the attacks of the counts of Aquino. This move apparently had the desired effect. About the same time, the counts of Venafro invaded the area of Acquafondata and Viticuso intending to build illegal fortifications (castra) there. The soldiers hired by Atenulf successfully fought them off. According to the Chronicle of Montecassino, the Normans "performed valiantly enough and faithfully as long as the abbot himself was alive."

In 1020, Boioannes, with the help of Pandulf IV, captured the Apulian rebel leader, Dattus, along with his Norman retinue. Atenulf intervened on behalf of the Normans, either in order to employ them himself or out of consideration for the feelings of those he already employed. In June 1021, Boioannes instructed the turmarcha Falcus, the inspector (episceptites) of Trani, to hand over all the property seized in and around that city from the rebel Maraldus to the abbot.

Atenulf's support for the Byzantines was regarded in Germany as treasonous. When the emperor decided to march south to assert his authority in 1022, he ordered Pandulf and Atenulf arrested. Archbishop Pilgrim of Cologne led an army of 20,000 against Montecassino and Capua. Atenulf fled to Otranto, in Byzantine territory, where he took a ship for Constantinople, the Byzantine capital. He died during a storm at sea on 30 March 1022. Upon learning of his demise, the emperor Henry is said to have quoted from Psalm 7: "He hath made a pit, and digged it, and is fallen into the ditch which he made."

== Sources ==
- Bloch, Herbert (1946). "Monte Cassino, Byzantium, and the West in the Earlier Middle Ages". Dumbarton Oaks Papers. 3: 163–224. doi:10.2307/1291045. JSTOR 1291045.
- Bloch, Herbert (1986). Monte Cassino in the Middle Ages. Volume I (Parts I–III). Harvard University Press.
- Loud, Graham A. (2000). The Age of Robert Guiscard: Southern Italy and the Northern Conquest. Taylor and Francis.
- Loud, Graham A. (2007). The Latin Church in Norman Italy. Cambridge University Press.
- Lowe, E. A. (1914). The Beneventan Script: A History of the South Italian Minuscule. Clarendon Press.
