= Otto II, Holy Roman Emperor =

Holy Roman Emperor from 973 to 983

Otto II
- Imperator Romanorum
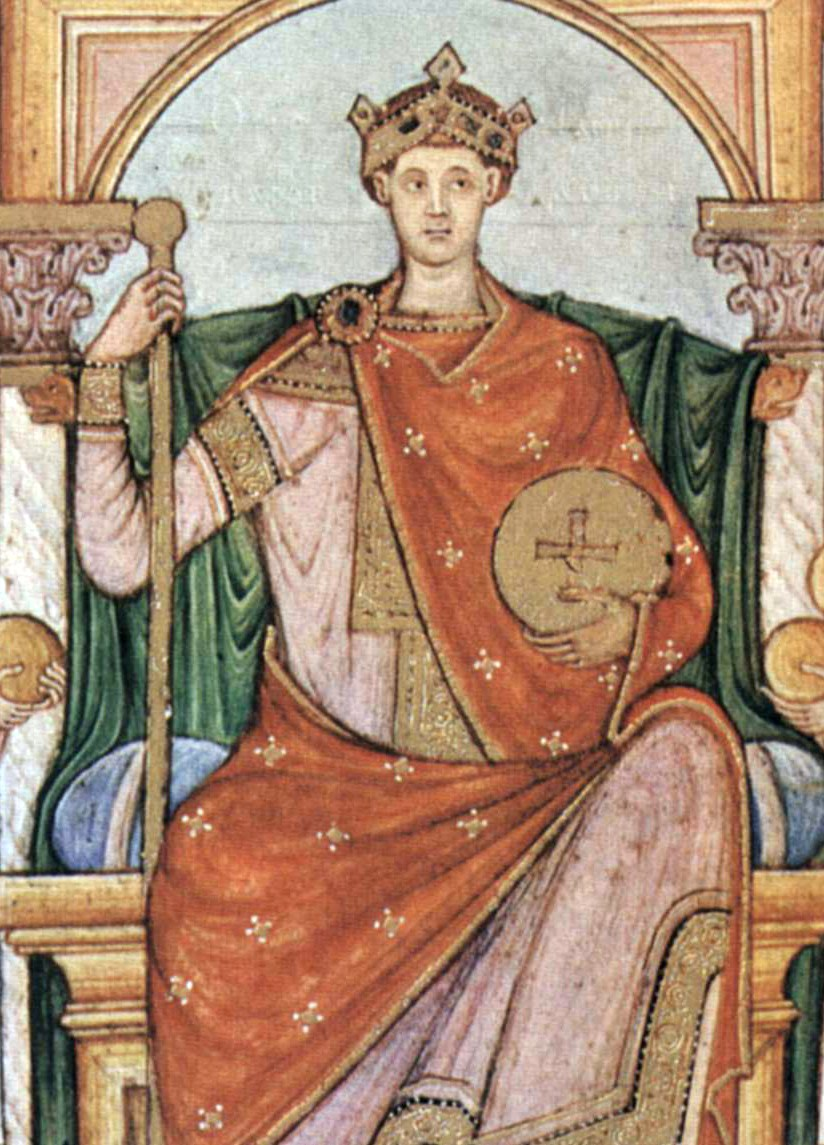
- Portrait of Otto II on the Registrum Gregorii illuminated manuscript, c. 985.

Holy Roman Emperor
- Reign: 7 May 973 – 7 December 983
- Coronation: 25 December 967 (as co-emperor)
- Predecessor: Otto I
- Successor: Otto III

King of Italy
- Reign: 25 December 980 – 7 December 983
- Predecessor: Otto I
- Successor: Otto III

King of Germany
- Reign: 26 May 961 – 7 December 983
- Predecessor: Otto I
- Successor: Otto III
- Born: 955; Duchy of Saxony, Kingdom of Germany
- Died: 7 December 983 (aged 27–28); Rome, Papal States
- Burial: St. Peter's Basilica
- Spouse: Theophanu (m. 972)
- Issue: Adelheid I, Abbess of Quedlinburg; Sophie I, Abbess of Gandersheim; Matilda, Countess Palatine of Lotharingia; Otto III, Holy Roman Emperor
- Dynasty: Ottonian
- Father: Otto the Great
- Mother: Adelaide of Italy

Otto II (955 – 7 December 983), called the Red (German: der Rote), was Holy Roman Emperor from 973 until his death in 983. A member of the Ottonian dynasty, he was the youngest and sole surviving son of Otto the Great and Adelaide of Italy.

Otto II was made joint-ruler of Germany in 961, at an early age, and his father named him co-Emperor in 967 to secure his succession to the throne. His father also arranged for Otto II to marry the Byzantine Princess Theophanu, who would be his wife until his death. When his father died after a 37-year reign, the 18-year-old Otto II became absolute ruler of the Holy Roman Empire in a peaceful succession. He spent his reign continuing his father's policy of strengthening Imperial rule in Germany and extending the borders of the Empire deeper into Southern Italy. Otto II also continued the work of Otto I in subordinating the Catholic Church to Imperial control.

Early in his reign, Otto II defeated a major revolt against his rule from other members of the Ottonian dynasty who claimed the throne for themselves. His victory allowed him to exclude the Bavarian line of the Ottonians from the line of Imperial succession. This strengthened his authority as Emperor and secured the succession of his own son to the Imperial throne.

With domestic affairs settled, Otto II would focus his attention from 980 onward to annexing the whole of Italy into the Empire. His conquests brought him into conflict with the Byzantine Empire and with the Muslims of the Fatimid Caliphate, who both held territories in southern Italy. After initial successes in unifying the southern Lombard principalities under his authority and in conquering Byzantine-controlled territory, Otto II's campaigns in southern Italy ended in 982 following a disastrous defeat by the Muslims. While he was preparing to counterattack Muslim forces, a major uprising by the Slavs broke out in 983, forcing the Empire to abandon its major territorial holdings east of the Elbe river.

Otto II died suddenly in 983 at the age of 28 after a 10-year reign. He was succeeded as Emperor by his three-year-old son Otto III, plunging the Empire into a political crisis.

== Early years ==
=== Birth and youth ===
Otto II was born in 955, the third son of King Otto the Great of Germany and his second wife, Adelaide of Italy. By 957, Otto II's older brothers, Henry (born 952) and Bruno (born 953), had died, as well as Liudolf, Otto I's son from his first wife, Eadgyth. With his older brothers dead, the two-year-old Otto became Otto I's heir apparent. Otto I entrusted his illegitimate son, Archbishop William of Mainz, with Otto II's literary and cultural education. Odo, margrave of the Eastern March, taught the young Otto the art of war and the kingdom's legal customs.

Needing to put his affairs in order prior to his descent into Italy, Otto I summoned a Diet at Worms and had Otto II elected, at the age of six, co-regent in May 961. Otto II was later crowned by his uncle Bruno the Great, archbishop of Cologne, at Aachen Cathedral, probably on Pentecost (26 May). While Otto I had secured the succession of the throne, he had violated the kingdom's unwritten law that succession rights could only be granted to a child who has reached the age of majority. He was likely motivated by the high risk associated with his expedition into Italy to claim the imperial title from the pope. Otto I crossed the Alps into Italy, while Otto II remained in Germany, and the two archbishops, Bruno and William, were appointed as his regents. After three-and-a-half years in Italy, Otto I returned to Germany early in 965 as Holy Roman emperor. In order to give the hope of dynastic continuity after his death, Otto I again confirmed Otto II as his heir on 2 February 965, the third anniversary of Otto I's coronation as emperor.

=== Heir apparent ===
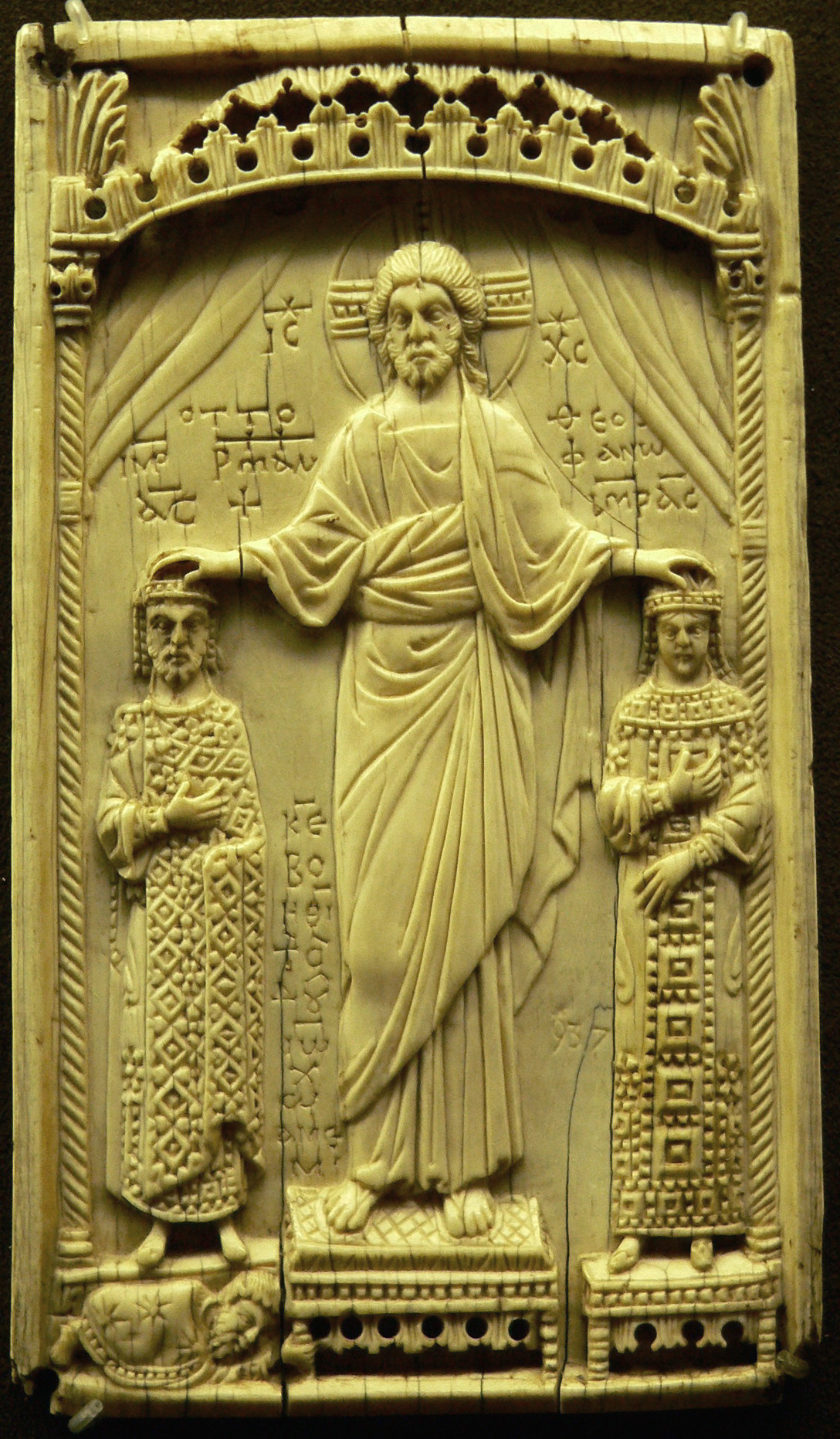
Otto II (left) and Theophano anointed as Emperor and Empress

Though Otto I was crowned emperor in 962 and returned to Germany in 965, the political situation in Italy remained unstable. After almost two years in Germany, Otto I made a third expedition to Italy in 966. Bruno was again appointed regent over the eleven-year-old Otto II during Otto I's absence.

With his power over northern and central Italy secured, Otto I sought to clarify his relationship with the Byzantine Empire in the East. The Byzantine Emperor objected to Otto's use of the title "emperor". The situation between East and West was finally resolved to share sovereignty over southern Italy. Otto I sought a marriage alliance between his house and the Eastern Macedonian dynasty. A prerequisite for the marriage alliance was the coronation of Otto II as co-emperor. Otto I then sent word for Otto II to join him in Italy. In October 967, father and son met in Verona and together marched through Ravenna to Rome. On 25 December 967, Otto II was crowned co-emperor by Pope John XIII, securing Otto II's succession to the Imperial crown following his father's death.

Otto II's coronation allowed marriage negotiations to begin with the East. Only in 972, six years later, under the new Byzantine Emperor John I Tzimiskes, was a marriage and peace agreement concluded, however. Though Otto I preferred Anna Porphyrogenita, daughter of former Byzantine Emperor Romanos II, as she was born in the purple, her age (then only five years old) prevented serious consideration by the East. The choice of Emperor John I Tzimisces was his niece Theophanu, who was the soldier-emperor's niece by marriage. On 14 April 972, the sixteen-year-old Otto II was married to the fourteen-year-old Eastern princess, and Theophanu was crowned empress by the pope.

Even after his coronation, Otto II remained in the shadow of his overbearing father. Though the nominal co-ruler of the Empire, he was denied any role in its administration. Unlike his earlier son Liudolf, whom Otto I named duke of Swabia in 950, Otto II was granted no area of responsibility. Otto II was confined primarily to northern Italy during his father's time south of the Alps. After five years away, the imperial family returned to Saxony in August 972.

On 7 May 973, Otto died of fever, and Otto II succeeded his father as sole emperor without meeting any opposition. Otto II spent his reign continuing his father's policy of strengthening Imperial rule in Germany and extending it deeper into Italy.

== Reign as emperor ==
=== Coronation and domestic strife ===
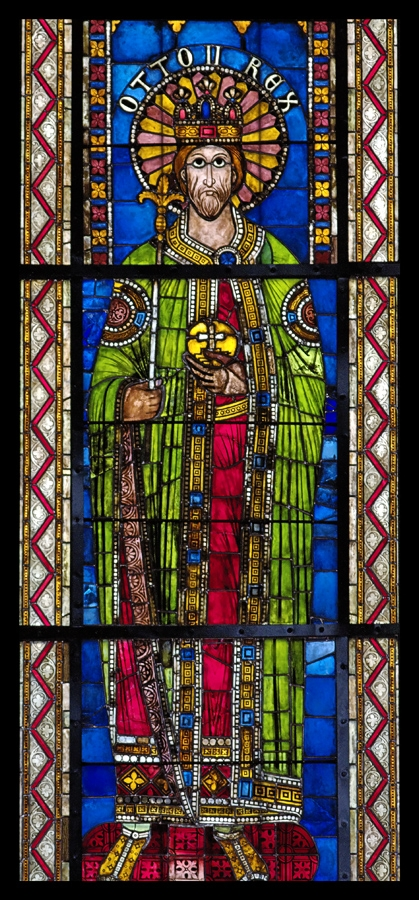
Otto II, from a series of Holy Roman emperors (12th and 13th centuries); the panels are now set into Gothic windows, Strasbourg Cathedral

When Otto the Great died, the smooth succession to the imperial throne of Otto II had long been guaranteed. Otto II had been king of Germany for twelve years and emperor for five at the time of Otto the Great's death. Unlike his father, Otto II did not have any brothers to contest his claims to the throne. On May 8, the nobles of the Empire assembled before Otto II and, according to the Saxon Chronicler Widukind of Corvey, "elected" Otto II as his father's successor. One of Otto II's first acts was to confirm the rights and possessions of the archbishop of Magdeburg. Although Otto II had succeeded peacefully to the throne, internal divisions of power still remained unaddressed. During his first seven years as emperor, he was constantly occupied with maintaining Imperial power against internal rivals and external enemies.

The domestic problems Otto the Great faced between 963 and 972 had not been resolved by his death. The Saxon nobility continued to resist the Archdiocese of Magdeburg located along the Empire's eastern border. Though established by Otto I, the exact details of the diocese's boundaries were left to Otto II and his aides. Otto II's marriage to Theophanu proved to be to his disadvantage because the Saxon nobles felt it distanced the emperor from their interests. Among Otto II's chief advisors, only the Saxon Bishop Dietrich I of Metz had close connections with the old Saxon nobility. His other advisers lacked support from the Empire's various dukes. The archbishop of Mainz, Willigis, appointed in 975, who had been Otto II's advisor since Otto the Great's second expedition into Italy in the 960s, had not been born into a noble family. Hildebald of Worms, who had been appointed as Otto II's chancellor in 977 and then as bishop of Worms in 979, was also not from a noble family.

Otto the Great also failed to clarify affairs in Italy prior to his death. Otto died soon after the appointment of Pope Benedict VI in 973. In 974 Benedict was imprisoned in the Castel Sant'Angelo, the stronghold of the Crescentii family. When Otto II sent an imperial representative, Count Sicco, to secure his release, Crescentius I and Cardinal-Deacon Franco Ferrucci, who would subsequently become Boniface VII, an antipope, had Benedict murdered while still in prison.

Following his coronation, a rift developed between Otto II and his mother, Empress Adelaide. From the death of Otto the Great until Easter 974, the dowager empress accompanied the emperor at all times, traveling throughout the Empire with him. However, Adelaide and Theophanu each mistrusted the influence the other held over Otto, causing friction within the household. A final meeting between Otto II and Adelaide was arranged shortly before Pentecost in 978, but a peaceful outcome was not achieved, forcing Adelaide to retire to Burgundy and to the protection of her brother King Conrad of Burgundy.

=== Conflict with Henry II ===
Otto II sought continued peace between himself and the descendants of his uncle Henry I, Duke of Bavaria. To ensure domestic tranquillity, Otto II, on 27 June 973, granted control over the imperial castles in Bamberg and Stegaurach to his cousin Duke Henry II of Bavaria. This was not enough for the young Bavarian duke, who wished to extend his influence in the Duchy of Swabia as his father had under Otto the Great. The death of Bishop Ulrich of Augsburg on 4 July, brought the conflict between the cousins to a head. Without consulting Otto, Henry named his cousin Henry as the new bishop of Augsburg. Augsburg was located on the western side of the Swabian-Bavarian border, the territory of Henry's brother-in-law Duke Burchard III of Swabia. Henry's actions in naming a bishop in a duchy not his own and without Imperial direction brought him into conflict with both Otto and Burchard. Not desiring civil war, Otto, on 22 September 973, invested Henry as bishop.

On 12 November 973, Burchard died with no heir: his union to Hedwig, sister of Henry, had produced no children. With no clear successor, Henry demanded that Otto name him as the new duke of Swabia. The emperor sensed the far-reaching ambitions of his cousin and denied his request. Instead, Otto named as duke his nephew Otto, son of his half-brother, Liudolf, who had once been duke of Swabia. Prior to this appointment, Otto had been a long-time opponent of Henry's expanding influence in Swabia. By naming the son of his half-brother instead of his cousin, Otto reinforced his father's policy of appointing close family members to key posts throughout the Empire. This appointment elevated the descendants of Otto the Great above other kin in the selection process, further dividing Otto II and Henry II.

The appointment of the young Otto as duke of Swabia was taken by Henry as an assault on his claim to the Imperial throne and a slight to his honor. He and his advisor, Bishop Abraham of Freising, conspired with the duke of Poland, Mieszko I, and the duke of Bohemia, Boleslaus II, against Otto II in 974. While the historical sources do not describe the goals of the conspirators, Henry II likely intended to restore his honor and to ensure his position as the second most influential man in the Empire. Upon hearing of the conspiracy, Poppo, the bishop of Würzburg, demanded that Henry and his followers submit to Otto II or face excommunication. Otto the Great's efforts to consolidate the Church under Imperial control had made this type of action normal. Henry and his followers complied and submitted to Otto II before armed conflict broke out. Otto II, however, severely punished the conspirators: Henry was imprisoned at Ingelheim and Bishop Abraham at Corvey.

By 976, Henry had returned to Bavaria. Whether Otto released him from prison or he escaped is not known for certain. Upon his return, Henry openly rebelled against Otto, claiming rulership over the Empire for himself. Henry mobilized the Saxon nobility against Otto. In particular, Henry had strong connections to Margrave Gunther of Merseburg, Count Egbert the One-Eyed, and Dietrich I of Wettin, who were all displeased with Otto's lack of adherence to Saxon tradition. In response to the rebellion, Otto stripped Henry of his duchy and had him excommunicated. Otto then marched his army south to Bavaria and laid siege to Regensburg, Henry's stronghold. Otto's army eventually broke through the city's defenses, forcing Henry to flee to Bohemia.

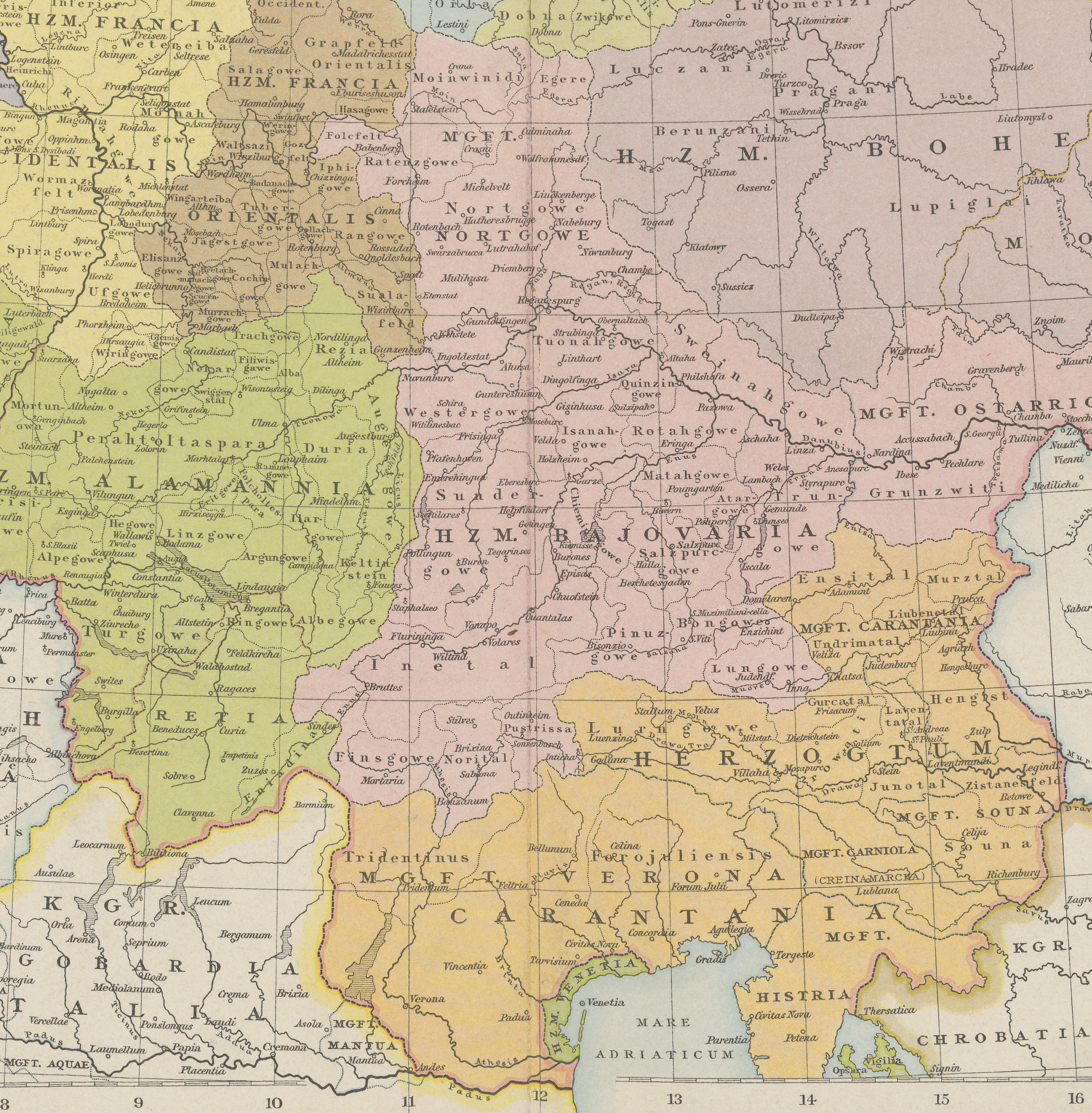
The Duchy of Carinthia (orange) was created by Otto II from confiscated territory of the Duchy of Bavaria (purple)

With Henry deposed, in July 976 Otto issued far-reaching edicts on the reorganization of the southern German duchies. He reduced the size of Duchy of Bavaria by almost a third. From the excised Bavarian territory, Otto established the Duchy of Carinthia in southern Germany. By depriving Bavaria of the March of Verona, Otto considerably reduced the influence of the Bavarian dukes in northern Italy and in general Imperial policy regarding Italy. Otto gave the diminished Duchy of Bavaria to his nephew Otto, the duke of Swabia, and appointed Henry III, son of the former Bavarian Duke Berthold, as duke of Carinthia. These appointments continued his policy of appointing individuals who had no political links to Otto the Great, including those who had even rebelled against him.

With matters in southern Germany settled, Otto II turned his attention to defeating and capturing Henry. After a failed first invasion into Bohemia, Otto marched to Bohemia a second time in August 977. While in Bohemia, a revolt broke out in Bavaria. The bishop of Augsburg and the newly appointed Carinthian duke joined Henry in rebellion, forcing Otto to return from Bohemia. The emperor, aided by the duke of Swabia and Bavaria, met the rebels at Passau and, after a long siege, forced them into submission. Otto then brought the rebels before the Imperial Diet in Quedlinburg on March 31, 978. Boleslaus was treated with honors and swore loyalty to Otto. Mieszko recognized Otto's royal authority. Otto imprisoned Henry under the custody of the bishop of Utrecht where he remained until Otto's death in 983.

While Otto the Great had pardoned rebellious family members for their crimes, Otto followed a different policy. Instead, Otto hoped to subordinate the Bavarian line of Ottonians to his authority. Henry's four-year-old son, also named Henry, was sent to Hildesheim to study for an ecclesiastical career. It appears Otto intended to end the Bavarian Ottonians' secular control of Bavaria. Under a new duke, Bavaria remained a remote area of the Empire. Otto only visited the duchy three times during his reign, in all cases accompanied by the military.

=== War with Denmark ===
In 950, Otto the Great had subdued the Kingdom of Denmark and forced the Danish King Gorm the Old to accept him as his overlord. Otto the Great also forced the king and his heir apparent Harald Bluetooth to convert to Christianity. Under the reign of Otto the Great, Denmark fulfilled all its obligations and regularly paid tribute to the Germans. When Harald became king in 958, he expanded the control of his kingdom into Norway, becoming king there in 970. With his newly obtained power, the young ruler was no longer willing to accept German supremacy over his kingdom. In summer 974, Harald rebelled against Otto II. With the support of Norwegian troops, Harald was able to cross the Danish border into Germany, defeating the German forces stationed in the north. Otto II attacked Harald's forces, but the joint Danish-Norwegian army repelled the German army. In autumn, however, when the Norwegian allies sailed north to return to Norway, Otto II was able to counter Harald's advances at the Danevirke.

=== War against France ===
Before Henry II's civil war in southern Germany erupted, Otto II was faced with disputes in western Germany. The brothers Reginar IV, Count of Mons, and Lambert I, Count of Louvain, demanded that the Emperor restore their confiscated inheritance in the Duchy of Lorraine. Years earlier in 958, Otto the Great banished their father Reginar III, Count of Hainaut, to Bohemia after he attempted a failed revolt. In 973, Otto II granted their request. With both Otto the Great and Count Reginar III dead, it appears Otto II desired a fresh start with the two sons. Lambert I and Reginar IV returned to Lorraine in 973 to reclaim their land by force. After an initial failure, the brothers attempted again in 976, this time with the support of King Lothar of France. To help calm the situation in the west, Otto II appointed Charles, his cousin and brother of Lothar, as Duke of Lower Lorraine. The same year, Otto II appointed Egbert as his Imperial Chancellor.

Otto II's support of Charles, however, infuriated the French king, who claimed the Duchy as his own territory. Charles and Lothair were also feuding, with Charles being exiled from France over an infidelity allegation he had made against Lothair's wife. Charles fled to Otto II's court and paid homage to Otto II. In return, Otto II appointed Charles as Duke and promised to support his claim to the French throne. Soon after Otto II crushed Henry II's revolt in the south, the Emperor and his wife Theophanu returned to the old capital of Aachen in Lorraine. With the Imperial family near the French border, Lothair invaded Lorraine and marched on Aachen. With the French army in sight, Otto II and Theophanu fled to Cologne and then to the Duchy of Saxony. Upon hearing of the French invasion, Otto II's mother Adelaide of Italy, who was Lothair's mother-in-law, sided with Lothair over her own son and moved to the court of her brother King Conrad of Burgundy. After occupying Aachen for five days, Lothair returned to France after symbolically disgracing the city.

Otto II convened the Imperial Diet in mid-July at Dortmund. There, Otto II declared war against France and prepared his army to march west. In September 978, Otto II retaliated against Lothair by invading France with the aid of Charles. He met with little resistance on French territory, devastating the land around Rheims, Soissons, and Laon. Otto II then had Charles crowned as King of the Franks by Theodoric I, Bishop of Metz. Lothair then fled to the French capital of Paris and was there besieged by Otto II and Charles. Sickness among his troops brought on by winter and a French relief army under Hugh Capet forced Otto II and Charles to lift the siege on November 30, and to return to Germany. On the journey back to Germany, Otto's rearguard was attacked and destroyed by French forces, with their supplies being captured. Despite neither side obtaining a clear victory, Otto II felt his honor was sufficiently restored and opened peace negotiations with the French King. Peace was finally concluded between Otto II and Lothair in 980: in return for renouncing his claims on Lorraine, Otto II would recognize Lothair's son Louis V as the rightful heir to the French throne.

With peace concluded, Otto II returned to Aachen to celebrate Pentecost, and then moved towards Nijmegen. During the journey, in late June or early July 980, the Empress Theophanu gave birth to the Imperial couple's only son: Otto III.

== Reign in Italy ==
=== Papal politics ===
With his rule north of the Alps secured and with the birth of his heir, Otto II shifted his focus to Italy. The situation south of the Alps was chaotic. Pope Benedict VI, who had been appointed by Otto I, had been imprisoned by the Romans in Castel Sant'Angelo. When Otto II sent an imperial representative, Count Sicco, to secure his release, Crescentius I and Cardinal Franco Ferrucci had Benedict VI murdered while still in prison in 974. Cardinal Franco Ferrucci then crowned himself as Benedict VI's successor, becoming Antipope Boniface VII. A popular revolt, however, forced Boniface VII to flee to Constantinople, taking a vast treasure with him. In October 974, under the direction of Count Sicco, the bishop of Sutri was elected Pope as Pope Benedict VII. Boniface VII was then summarily excommunicated for his unsuccessful attempt to take the papacy.

In 979 Benedict VII's position as ruler of Rome was threatened, forcing the Pope to withdraw from and seek the aid of the Emperor. Accepting the Pope's call for aid, Otto II and Theophanu, along with their infant son Otto III, prepared for a march south across the Alps. Otto II appointed Willigis, the Archbishop of Mainz, to serve as his regent over Germany.

In October 980 the Imperial court arrived in Chiavenna and received its first Italian delegations. Otto II arrived in Italy at Pavia on December 5, 980. In Pavia, Otto II and his mother, the dowager empress Adelaide of Italy, were reconciled after years of being apart. Before the imperial family celebrated Christmas together in Ravenna, Otto II received the Iron Crown of Lombardy as the King of Italy. Following the New Year, Otto II led his Imperial court to Rome, reaching the city on February 9, 981, where the Emperor restored Pope Benedict VII to his papal throne without difficulty. In Rome, Otto II held a magnificent court ceremony to mark Easter. The imperial family was joined by Otto II's sister Matilda, Abbess of Quedlinburg, King Conrad of Burgundy and his wife Matilda of France, Duke Hugh Capet of France, Duke Otto of Swabia and Bavaria, and other high secular and religious officials from Germany, Italy and France.

Otto II proceeded to hold court in Rome, making the city his Imperial capital, where he received princes and nobles from all parts of western Europe.

=== Venetian affairs ===
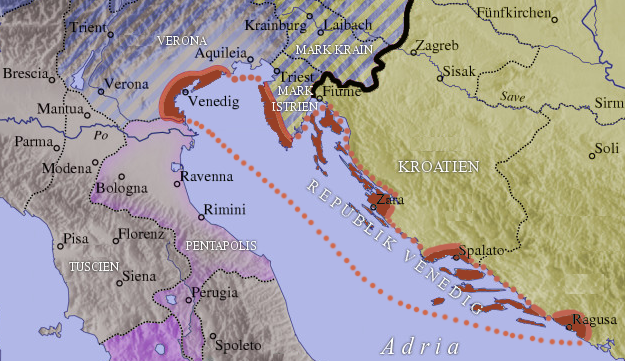
Territory of the Venetian Republic (in red) shortly after Otto II's reign.

The relationship between the Empire and the Republic of Venice was readdressed during Otto II's reign. In 966, The Doge of Venice Pietro IV married Waldrada of Tuscany, a second cousin of Otto II. The marriage brought the Empire and Venice into close relationship, with Otto I, in 967, granting a series of commercial agreements to Venice in general and to Pietro IV's family in particular. These agreements strengthened Venice's tie to the Western Empire, which greatly angered the Byzantine Emperor John I Tzimisces as Venice controlled all sea trade between Western Europe and the Byzantine Levant in the East.

Otto I's military protection of Pietro IV ensured his hold over power in Venice despite his autocratic tendencies over the republican city. In 973, however, Otto I died. With Otto II busy suppressing revolts in Germany, the Venetians opposed to Pietro IV found their opportunity to depose him. Imprisoning the Doge within his palace, the Venetian nobles set fire to the building. However, the fire soon spread to Saint Mark's Basilica, resulting in the greater part of the city being burnt. The Doge and his son, also named Pietro, were killed in the blaze, but their bodies were later recovered and respectfully buried. Pietro IV's son by the first marriage, Vitale Candiano Patriarch of Grado survived, as well as his namesake Vitale Candiano, presumably the son of Petro, fled to Otto II's court in Saxony with plans to depose the new pro-Byzantine Doge, Pietro I Orseolo.

Pietro I Orselo's conciliating policy towards the Empire was ineffective. After having ruled Venice for about two years, Pietro I voluntarily abdicated to become a monk, allowing the pro-Ottonian Vitale to return to Venice as Doge in 978, restoring the city's friendly relationship with the Empire. However, Vitale's reign was short (less than two years) and he too abdicated to become a monk. With the position vacant, the pro-Byzantine Tribuno Memmo became the new Doge in 979. With the change in leadership, Otto II was reluctant to renew the city's commercial agreements which his father had previously granted to the city. It was only after the intervention of Otto II's mother, the dowager empress Adelaide of Italy, that the Emperor renewed the agreements.

Violence erupted in Venice during 980 due to tensions between the pro-Ottonian Coloprini family and the pro-Byzantine Morosini family. The Coloprini pleaded with the Emperor for support. Seeing an opportunity to fully incorporate Venice into the Empire, Otto II agreed. Upon arriving in Italy in 981, Otto II immediately imposed a trade embargo against the island republic. When the initial embargo showed little effect on Venice, Otto II imposed a second embargo in 983 which dealt considerable damage to the Venetian economy. The effects were disastrous enough to cause the ruling Venetian families to surrender to Otto II, but Otto II's untimely death that year prevented him from capitalizing on his victory. The Chronicle of John the Deacon claims that the early death is the punishment for persecuting the Venetians, as There is no doubt that, as a monk blessed with the prophetic spirit had revealed to him on the instructions of an angel, he ran into sudden death because he had persecuted the Venetians.

=== Religious policy ===
Otto II followed the policy of his father in expanding the importance of the Church in his Empire, in particular the importance of monasticism and monasteries. The Church and its organs served as a supporting and stabilizing factor in the Empire's structure. To fulfill these tasks, Otto II strengthened the legal integrity and economic independence of the bishops from the secular nobility. The Ottonians had a particular religious interest in Memleben as both Otto II's father Otto I and grandfather Henry I had died there. Otto II and his wife Theophanu enhanced the spiritual importance of the city by establishing a Benedictine Imperial abbey there: the Memleben Abbey. Within a short time, the Memleben Abbey had become one of the richest and most influential of the Imperial abbeys. These measures and the unusual size of the abbey perhaps suggest that Memleben may have been intended as an Imperial Mausoleum for the Ottonians.

Following the suppression of Henry II's rebellion, Otto II used the Empire's monasteries as the location for the treason trials. While his father had founded only one monastery (Otto I later replaced the abbey with the Cathedral of Magdeburg) during his 37-year reign, Otto II established at least four monasteries: Memleben, Tegernsee, Bergen, and Arneburg. Monasticism became a key part of Otto II's Imperial policy, entrusting the abbots with key political functions.

Otto II employed monks among his top political advisers, including Ekkehard I and Majolus of Cluny. One of the most important such monks was John Philagathus (the future Antipope John XVI). Of Greek descent, John was the personal chaplain of Otto II's wife Theophanu, accompanying her when she traveled from Constantinople to marry Otto II. Otto II appointed him as his Imperial Chancellor from 980 to 982, as well as abbot of Nonantola Abbey. Following Otto II's death in 983, Theophanu, as her son Otto III's regent, would name John as Otto III's tutor. She would later appoint John as the bishop of Piacenza, and would send him to Constantinople to arrange for a marriage between Otto III and a Byzantine princess.

=== Southern expansion ===
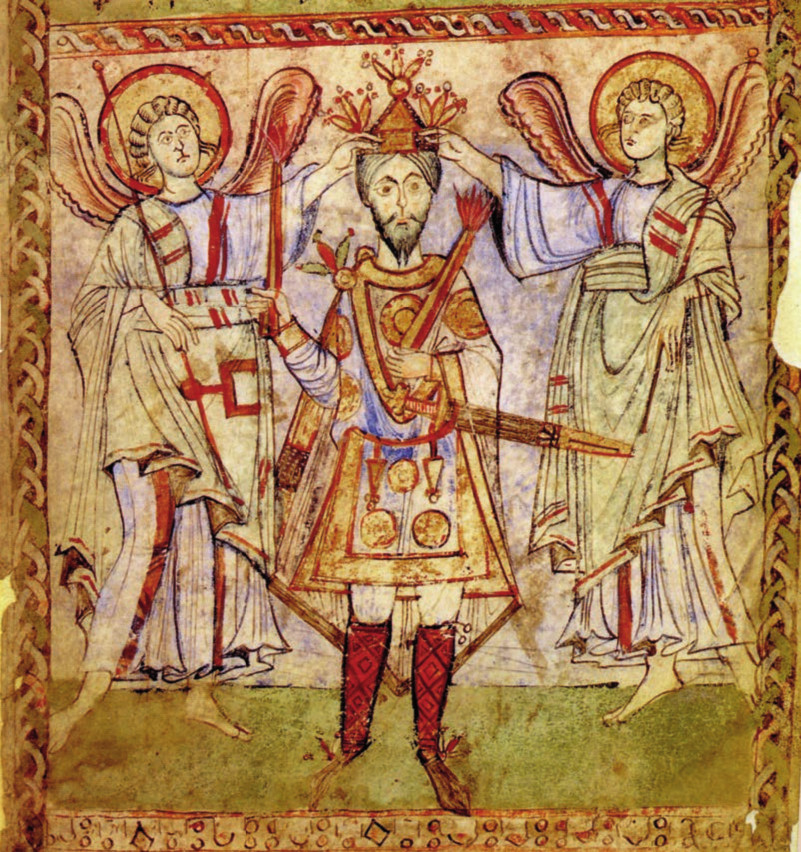
Otto II, from a south Italian exultet roll, c. 985

In regard to his Italian policy, Otto II went beyond the goals of his father. Not satisfied with the territorial gains made under Otto I, Otto II's policy was based not only on securing his power in Rome and cooperating with the Papacy, but also on gaining absolute dominion over the whole of Italy. Influenced by his wife, who was hostile to the return of the Macedonian Dynasty in the shape of Byzantine Emperor Basil II after the assassination of John I Tzimisces, Otto II was persuaded to annex Byzantine-controlled southern Italy. However, this policy necessarily meant war not only with the Byzantine Empire but with the Muslim Fatimid Caliphate, which claimed southern Italy as within its sphere of influence.

The Ottonians' chief lieutenant in central and southern Italy had long been the Lombard leader Pandulf Ironhead. Originally appointed by Otto I as Prince of Benevento and Capua in 961, Pandulf waged war against the Byzantines and expanded Ottonian control to include the Duchy of Spoleto in 967. The following year, under Otto II, Pandulf added the Principality of Salerno to the Empire. His campaigns under Otto I and Otto II incorporated all three of the southern Lombard principalities - Benevento, Capua, and Salerno - into the Holy Roman Empire. As vassal of Otto II, Pandulf ruled a large bloc of territories stretching as far north as Tuscany and as far south as the Gulf of Taranto.

Pandulf's death in 981 deprived Otto II of one of his primary lieutenants. Pandulf's lands were partitioned among his sons, though further quarrels between the local Lombard princes soon followed. Pandulf's older son Landulf IV received Capua and Benevento while his younger son Pandulf II received Salerno. Upon hearing of Pandulf's death, Otto II, ruling from Rome, traveled south to install Thrasimund IV as Duke of Spoleto. Then, Pandulf's nephew Pandulf II was given Benevento when Otto II partitioned Landulf IV's territory, with Landulf IV keeping Capua. Finally, Duke Manso I of Amalfi deposed Pandulf II of Salerno in 982.

By 982 the entire area once ruled by Pandulf had collapsed, weakening Otto II's position against the Byzantines. The Byzantines still claimed sovereignty over the Lombard principalities, and the lack of a single leader to prevent their advances into Lombard territory allowed the Byzantines to make inroads further north. Otto II attempted on several occasions to reunify the Lombard principalities politically and ecclesiastically into his Empire after Pandulf's death. Though he unsuccessfully besieged Manso I in Salerno, Otto II ultimately obtained the recognition of his authority from all the Lombard principalities.

Italy around 1000, shortly after Otto II's death in 983.

With his authority reestablished over the Lombard princes, Otto II turned his attention towards the threat from Muslim Sicily. Since the 960s the island had been under Muslim rule as the Emirate of Sicily, a state of the Fatimid Caliphate. The ruling Kalbid dynasty had conducted raids against Imperial territories in southern Italy. The death of Pandulf in 981 allowed the Sicilian Emir Abu al-Qasim to increase his raids, hitting targets in Apulia and Calabria. As early as 980 Otto II demanded a fleet from the city of Pisa to help him carry out his war in southern Italy, and in September 981 he marched into southern Italy. Needing allies in his campaign against the Muslims and the Byzantine Empire, Otto II reconciled with Amalfian Duke Manso I, granting Imperial recognition of his rule over Salerno.

Otto II's troops marched on Byzantine-controlled Apulia in January 982 with the purpose of annexing the territory into his Empire. Otto II's march caused the Byzantine Empire to seek an alliance with Muslim Sicily in order to hold on to its southern Italian possessions. Otto's army besieged and captured the Byzantine city of Taranto, the administrative center of Apulia, in March 982. After celebrating Easter in Taranto, Otto II moved his army westward, defeating a Muslim army in early July. Emir Abu al-Qasim, who had declared a Holy War (jihad) against Otto, retreated when he noticed the unexpected strength of Otto II's troops when the latter was not far from Rossano Calabro. Informed of the Muslim retreat, Otto II left his wife Theophanu and young son Otto III (along with the Imperial treasury) in the city and marched his army to pursue the Muslim force.

Unable to flee back to his stronghold in Sicily due to an Ottonian naval blockade, al-Qasim faced Otto's army in what has been come to be known as the Battle of Stilo south of Crotone at Cape Colonna on July 14, 982. After a violent clash, a corps of Otto II's heavy cavalry destroyed the Muslim center and pushed towards al-Qasim's guards, with the Emir killed during the charge. Despite the Emir's death, the Muslim troops did not flee the battlefield but regrouped and managed to surround the Imperial soldiers, slaughtering many of them and inflicting a severe defeat upon the Emperor. According to the Muslim historian Ibn al-Athir, Imperial casualties numbered around 4,000. Landulf IV of Benevento and Pandulf II of Salerno, Bishop Henry I of Augsburg, Margrave Gunther of Merseburg, the Abbot of Fulda, and numerous other Imperial officials were among the battle's casualties.

The Imperial defeat shocked the political makeup of Southern Italy. With two Lombard princes dead, the Principalities of Capua and the Benevento passed to younger branches of the Landulfid family. Though the Muslim troops were forced to retreat to Sicily after their victory, the Muslims remained a presence in southern Italy, harassing the Byzantines and Lombards. This Ottonian defeat, the worst in the history of the Empire at the time, greatly weakened Imperial power in southern Italy. The Byzantines joined forces with the Muslims and regained possession of Apulia from Ottonian forces.

== Imperial crisis ==
=== Succession issues ===
Holy Roman Empire in 972–1032

The defeat at Stilo forced Otto II to flee north to Rome. He then held an Imperial Diet at Verona on Pentecost 983. He sent his nephew Otto I, Duke of Swabia and Bavaria, back to Germany with news of the defeat and to call the German nobles to the assembly, but his emissary died en route on November 1, 982, in Lucca. News of the battle did cross the Alps, however, reaching as far as Wessex in England, signifying the magnitude of the defeat. Duke Bernard I of Saxony was heading south for the assembly when Danish Viking raids forced him to return to face the threat.

At the assembly, Otto II appointed Conrad (a distant relative of Otto II) and Henry III as the new Dukes of Swabia and Bavaria respectively. Henry III had previously been exiled by Otto II following his defeat as part of a two-year revolt against Otto II's rule. The defeat at Stilo cost the Empire many nobles, forcing Otto II to end Henry's banishment in order to stabilize domestic affairs in Germany while he campaigned against the Muslims and Byzantines in southern Italy. Also, the appointment of Conrad I allowed the House of the Conradines to return to power in Swabia for the first time since 948. Otto II and the assembled nobles agreed on a strategy of naval blockade and economic warfare until reinforcements from Germany could arrive. Otto II then prepared for a new campaign against the Muslims and obtained a settlement with the Republic of Venice, whose assistance he needed following the destruction of his army at Stilo. However, the death of Otto II the next year and the resulting civil war prevented the Empire from appropriately responding to the defeat.

The most important action taken by Otto II at the assembly, however, was to secure the "election" of his son Otto III, who was then only three years old, as King of Germany and heir apparent to the Imperial throne. Otto III thus became the only German king elected south of the Alps. The exact reason for this unusual procedure has been lost to history. It is possible that the conditions in southern Italy following the defeat required Otto II to act quickly in designating an Imperial heir to ensure the Empire's future. It is also conceivable, however, that holding the election in Italy was a deliberate choice on the part of Otto II in order to demonstrate that Italy was an equal part of the Empire to Germany. His election secured, Otto III and his mother, the Empress Theophanu, traveled north across the Alps heading for Aachen, the traditional coronation site for the Ottonians, in order for Otto III to be officially crowned as king. Otto II stayed in Italy to further address his military campaigns.

=== Great Slav uprising ===
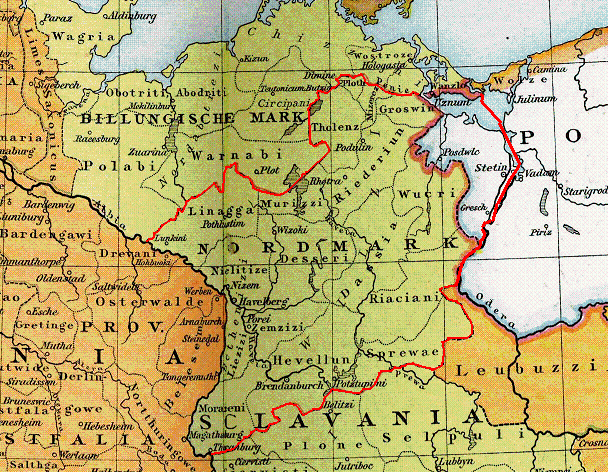
The Northern March (outlined in red) between the Billung March in the north and the Saxon Eastern March (March of Lusatia) in the south. Both the Billung March and the North March were lost following the Great Slav Rising.

Around the year 982, Imperial authority in Slavic territory extended as far east as the Lusatian Neisse River and as far south as the Ore Mountains. Following the defeat of Otto II at Stilo in 983, the Lutici Federation of Polabian Slavs revolted against their German overlords, sparking the Great Slav Rising (Slawenaufstand). The Polabian Slavs destroyed the bishoprics of Havelberg and Brandenburg. According to the German chronicler Bishop Thietmar of Merseburg, the decades-long forced Germanization and Christianization of the Slavs associated with these two churches was the reason for their destruction. Thietmar blames the uprising on maltreatment of the Slavs by the Germans: "Warriors, who used to be our servants, now free as a consequence of our injustices." In the Obotrite territories along the Elbe River, the Luticians initiated a revolt aimed at the abolition of feudal rule and Christianity, drawing upon considerable support by the Obodrite populace and their leader Mstivoj. In part, the Obodrite revolt was successful: The princely family, though in part remaining Christian, dissolved Christian institutions.

Soldiers from the Northern March, the March of Meissen, and the March of Lusatia, as well as from the Bishop of Halberstadt and the Archbishop of Magdeburg, joined forces to defeat the Slavs near Stendal. Nevertheless, the Empire was forced to withdraw to the western banks of the Elbe river. The successes of the Empire's Christianization policy towards the Slavs were nullified, and political control over the Billung March and the Northern March (territories east of the Elbe) was lost. In the decade since his death, Otto I's life work of converting the Slavs was undone. The Slavic territories east of the Elbe would remain pagan for over a century before further missionary work resumed: it would not be until the 12th century that the churches of Havelberg and Brandenburg would be reestablished.

The Danes took advantage of the Slavic revolt and invaded the March of Schleswig along the Empire's northern border while the Sorb Slavs invaded and conquered the March of Zeitz from the Saxons.

=== Sudden death and political turmoil ===
In July 983, Pope Benedict VII, a longtime Ottonian supporter, died of natural causes after having reigned for almost ten years. Otto II returned to Rome in September to name a new pope, selecting the bishop of Pavia, Pietro Canepanova (who reigned as Pope John XIV), in November or early December. While Otto II was in Rome, a malaria outbreak in central Italy prevented the resumption of military activity in southern Italy. The outbreak ultimately led to the death of the Emperor himself in his palace at Rome on December 7, 983, at the age of 28, after having reigned for just over a decade. Otto II's money and possessions were divided among the Catholic Church, the poor of the Empire, his mother Adelaide and sister Matilda, and those nobles loyal to him. Otto II was then buried in the atrium of St. Peter's Basilica, the only Holy Roman emperor to be buried in St Peter's.

Otto II's three-year-old son Otto III was crowned as king of Germany in Aachen on Christmas Day in 983, three weeks after his father's death. Otto III was crowned by Willigis, the archbishop of Mainz, and John, the Archbishop of Ravenna. News of Otto II's death first reached Germany after Otto III's coronation. The unresolved problems in southern Italy and the Slavic uprising on the Empire's eastern border made the Empire's political situation extremely unstable. The arrival of a minor on the Imperial throne threw the Empire into confusion, allowing Otto III's mother, the Byzantine Princess Theophanu, to reign as his regent.

In 976, Otto had deposed his cousin Henry as duke of Bavaria and imprisoned him. In early 984, Henry escaped from his imprisonment. He seized the infant Otto III and, as a member of the ruling dynasty, claimed the regency of the Empire for himself. Henry eventually went so far as to claim the German throne outright, obtaining the allegiance of the dukes of Poland and Bohemia. Henry 's claims were supported by Archbishop Egbert of Trier, Archbishop Gisilher of Magdeburg, and Bishop Dietrich I of Metz. Otto III's right to the throne, however, was supported by Archbishop Willigis of Mainz and the dukes of Saxony, Bavaria, and Swabia. The threat of war from Willigis and Conrad of Swabia forced Henry to relinquish Otto III on June 29, 984 and to respect the regency of Empress Theophanu.

The early death of Otto II and the ensuing events proved to be a serious test for the Empire. Despite having a child under the regency of his mother as a ruler, the structure established by Otto the Great remained strong as most of the Empire's most powerful officials stayed loyal to the Imperial system.

== Character ==
Otto was a man of small stature, by nature brave and impulsive, and by training an accomplished knight. He was generous to the church and aided the spread of Christianity in many ways. According to one of the chroniclers of the time, he was given the epithet of the "Red" when in 981 he invited the most troublesome of the Roman families to a banquet, and proceeded to butcher them at dinner. More sympathetic chroniclers said that it was due to his reddish complexion. In fact, Otto is much more likely to have inherited the epithet from his half-uncle Conrad the Red, who died the year he was born and from whom he is also likely to have inherited some property.

== Family and children ==
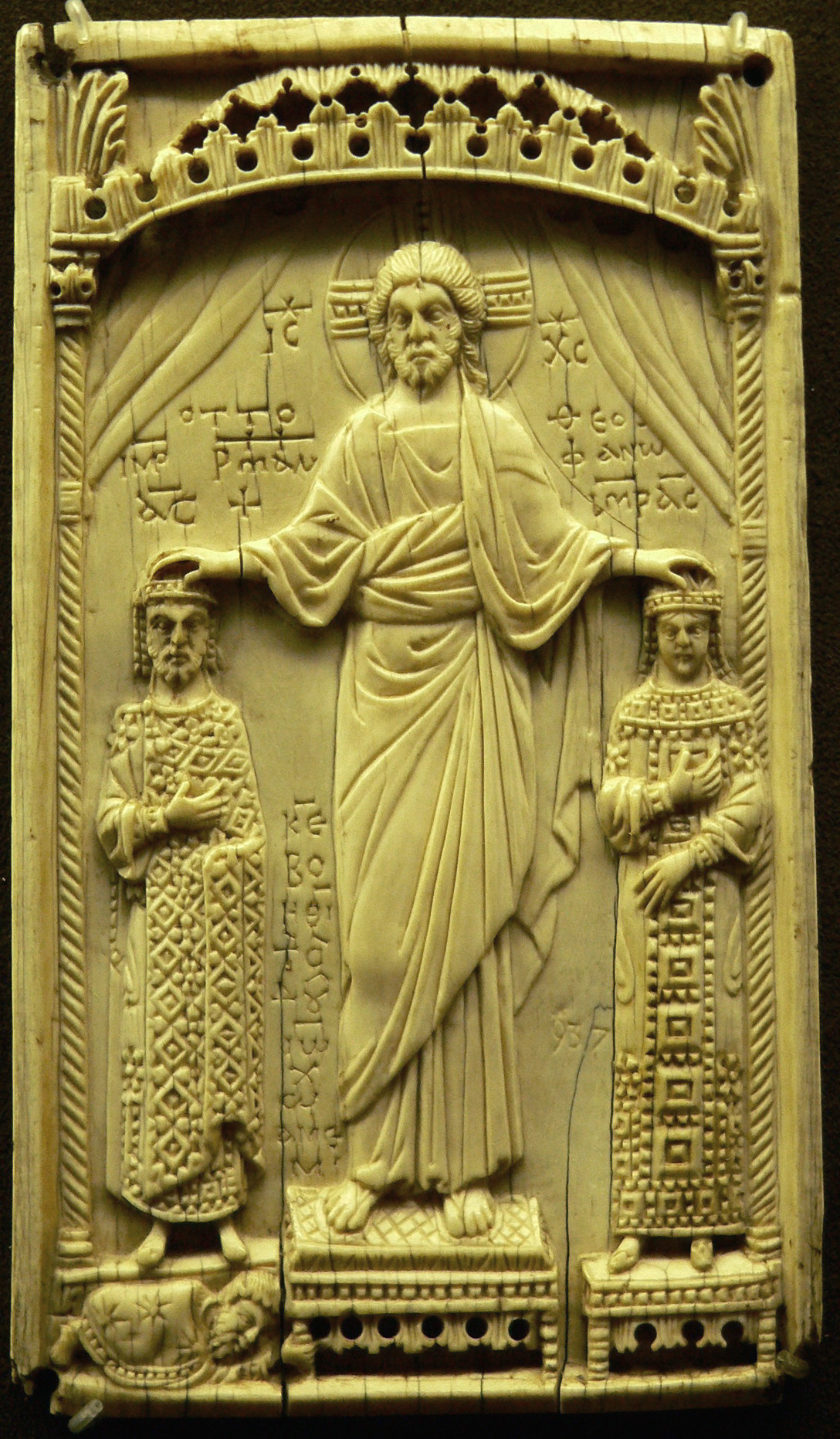
Jesus blesses the marriage of Otto (left) and Theophanu (right) on an ivory book cover, dated to AD 982/3

Otto II was a member of the Ottonian dynasty, which ruled Germany (and later the Holy Roman Empire) from 919 to 1024. In relation to the other members of his dynasty, Otto II was the grandson of Henry I, son of Otto I, father of Otto III, and a first-cousin once removed to Henry II.

Otto II had only one known wife. On 14 April 972, Otto II married Theophanu, a Byzantine princess of the Phokas family who was the cousin of reigning Byzantine Emperor John I Tzimiskes. The two had at least five children:

- Adelheid I, Abbess of Quedlinburg and Gandersheim, born 973/974, died 1045.
- Sophie I, Abbess of Gandersheim and Essen, born October 975, died 1039.
- Matilda, born summer 978, died 1025; who married Ezzo, count palatine of Lotharingia.
- Otto III, Holy Roman Emperor, born end June/early July 980.
- A daughter, a twin to Otto, who died before October 8, 980.

== See also ==
- Kings of Germany family tree

== Bibliography ==
- Comyn, Robert. History of the Western Empire, from its Restoration by Charlemagne to the Accession of Charles V, Vol. I. 1851
- Duckett, Eleanor Shipley. (1967). Death and life in the tenth century. Ann Arbor: University of Michigan Press – via HathiTrust.
- McKitterick, Rosamond (1999). The Frankish Kingdoms under the Carolingians. Pearson Education Limited.
- Müller-Mertens, Eckhard (2000). "The Ottonians as Kings and Emperors". In Reuter, Timothy (ed.). The New Cambridge Medieval History, Volume 3, c.900–c.1024. Cambridge: Cambridge University Press. ISBN 978-1-13905572-7.
- Norwich, John J. (1991). Byzantium: The Apogee. London: BCA.
- Sismondi, J. C. L. History of the Italian Republics in the Middle Ages. 1906

Otto II, Holy Roman Emperor House of Otto Born: 955 Died: December 7, 983
Regnal titles
Preceded by Otto I	Holy Roman Emperor; 967–983 with Otto I (967–973)	Succeeded by Otto III
Preceded by Otto I	King of Italy; 980–983	Succeeded by Otto III
Preceded by Otto I	King of Germany; 961–983 with Otto I (961–973); Otto III (983)	Succeeded by Otto III
