= Theobald II of Spoleto =

10th-century Italian duke and margrave

Theobald II (923/925 – July 957/961 or 964) was the Duke of Spoleto and Margrave of Camerino from 953. He was the son of Boniface II of Spoleto and Waldrada.

In 959, Berengar and Guy of Ivrea led an expedition against Theobald. They defeated him and captured both Spoleto and Camerino. Duke Theobald was deposed by Emperor Otto I around the year 964 because of his support for the deposed Pope John XII.The Chronicles of Farfa suggest that he was succeeded by Count Transmond of Camerino, but there are no documents attesting to this succession. Instead it seems likely that Theobald was succeeded by Otto's loyal supporter Prince Pandulf I (Pandulf Ironhead).

Italian nobility
Preceded by Boniface II	Duke of Spoleto; 953–959	Succeeded by Trasmond III of Camerino
Preceded by Boniface II	Margrave of Camerino; 953–959	Succeeded by Guy of Ivrea
