= Landulf III =

Landulf III may refer to:

- Landulf III of Capua (died 943)
- Landulf III of Benevento (died 968 or 969)
