= Commemorative coins of the Netherlands =

The list of the coins included are for those issued by the Royal Dutch Mint from 1970 to 2001

10 Gulden

- 1970 .720 silver 38 mm. 25th year of the end of the Second World War and liberation, 1945–1970
- 1973 .720 silver 38 mm. 25th year of reign, Queen Juliana, 1948–1973
- 1994 .925 silver 33 mm. 50th anniversary of the BE NE LUX trade accord, 1944–1994
- 1995 .925 silver 33 mm. 350th anniversary, death of Hugo the Great, 1583–1645
- 1996 .925 silver 33 mm. Jan Steen
- 1997 .925 silver 33 mm. 50th anniversary of the Marshall plan and reconstruction

50 Gulden

- 1982 .925 silver 38 mm. 200th anniversary, Dutch - American friendship
- 1984 .925 silver 38 mm. William of Orange
- 1987 .925 silver 38 mm. 50th wedding anniversary, Princess (Queen) Juliana & Prince Bernhard
- 1989 .925 silver 38 mm. 300th anniversary, crowning of William of Orange and Mary of England
- 1990 .925 silver 38 mm. 100 years of Queens Regnant in the Netherlands
- 1991 .925 silver 38 mm. 25th Wedding Anniversary of Queen Beatrix & Prince Claus
- 1994 .925 silver 38 mm. Ratification of Maastricht Treaty
- 1995 .925 silver 38 mm. 50th Anniv. Liberation W.W.II
- 1998 .925 silver 38 mm. 350th Anniv. Peace of Munster 1648-1998
