= Guy of Ivrea =

Margrave of Ivrea from 950 to 965

Guy (or Guido) (c. 940 – 25 June 965) was the margrave of Ivrea from 950 to his death. In 950, his father, King Berengar II of Italy, appointed him to rule in the familial margraviate. His mother was Willa of Tuscany, his elder brother was Adalbert II, co-king with their father, and their younger brother was Conrad.

In 959, Guy sheltered the exiled doge of Venice, Pietro III Candiano. Guy brought Pietro to his father the king and then the two of them led an expedition against Theobald II, Duke of Spoleto. He captured both Spoleto and Camerino.

In 962, when Adalbert returned from exile in Corsica to try to reclaim his throne. Guy and Conrad joined with him in besieging Pavia, the Italian capital. The brothers then retreated into the fortresses around Lakes Como and Garda. His lands were confiscated by the Emperor Otto I and given to Guy, Bishop of Modena.

== Death ==
In 965, Guy was killed fighting an army of Swabians under Duke Burchard III. The fatal battle took place on the Po as he went to his brother's rescue. Adalbert and Conrad escaped to Constantinople.
