= Robert F. Barkowski =

German translator and writer

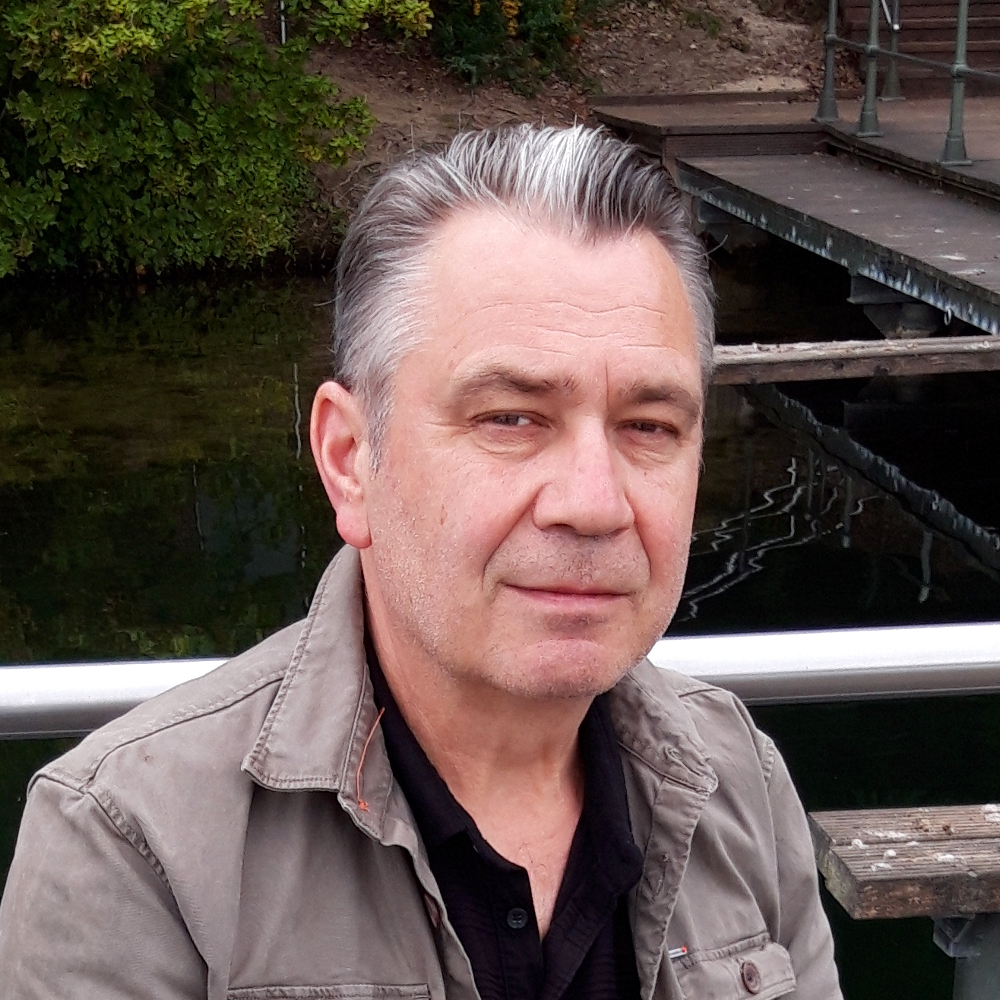
- Born: 29 March 1963 (age 63); Zielona Góra, Poland
- Education: Hochschule für Technik und Wirtschaft Berlin
- Occupation: Writer
- Writing career
- Language: Polish, German
- Genres: History, Popular history, Middle Ages, Military history, European History
- Website: robert-barkowski.com

Robert F. Barkowski (born 29 March 1963 in Zielona Góra) is a Polish writer, author of historical novels and historical nonfiction in Polish and German. He spent his childhood, school years, early university years and first employment in Gdańsk. Since the late 1980s he has been living in Berlin. His works are mainly focused on history of Europe in the Middle Ages.

Cooperation's with German publishing houses (Stroemfeld Verlag, Parthas Verlag, form+zweck, viceversaverlag, Deutscher Kunstverlag, vorwärts buch) as an author, editor, translator and publisher, as well as Polish publishing house Bellona and Novae Res as an author.

For years he is engaged in promoting Polish literature, culture and knowledge about Poland in Germany. On 11 May 2016 he received the medal of honour "For Merits for Polish Culture" by the minister of culture and education.

== Bibliography ==
=== Historical fiction (novels) ===
- Opowieści połabskie. Novae Res, Gdynia 2022, ISBN 978-83-8219-806-5.

==== Powieść historyczna z czasów piastowskich series ====
- Włócznia. Novae Res, Gdynia 2021, ISBN 978-83-8219-260-5.
- Odsiecz. Novae Res, Gdynia 2022, ISBN 978-83-8219-797-6.

=== Historical non-fiction ===
- Die Ottonen und das Konzept eines vereinten Europa („Ottonian dynasty“). Parthas Verlag, Berlin 2014, ISBN 978-3-86964-073-0.
- Słowianie połabscy. Dzieje zagłady („The Polabian Slavs. History of extinction“). Bellona, Warszawa 2015, ISBN 978-83-11-13741-7.
- Crotone 982 („Battle of Crotone 982“). Bellona, Warszawa 2015, ISBN 978-83-11-13732-5.
- Połabie 983 („Uprising of the Polabian Slavs 983“). Bellona, Warszawa 2015, ISBN 978-83-11-13913-8.
- Poitiers 732 („Battle of Poitiers 732“). Bellona, Warszawa 2016, ISBN 978-83-11-14104-9.
- Tajemnice początków państwa polskiego – 966 („Secrets of the ascent of the Polish State, A.D. 966“). Bellona, Warszawa 2016, ISBN 978-83-11-13904-6.
- Lechowe Pole 955 („Battle of Lechfeld (955)“). Bellona, Warszawa 2016, ISBN 978-83-11-14231-2.
- Krucjata połabska 1147 („Wendish Crusade 1147“). Bellona, Warszawa 2017, ISBN 978-83-11-14446-0.
- Historia wojen gdańskich do 1466 roku („Military history of Gdańsk - medieval“). Bellona, Warszawa 2017, ISBN 978-83-11-14343-2.
- Syberia 1581-1697 („Siberia 1581-1697“). Bellona, Warszawa 2017, ISBN 978-83-11-15047-8.
- Poczet władców słowiańskich 631-1168, Połabie. Bellona, Warszawa 2017, ISBN 978-83-11-15119-2.
- Budziszyn 1002-1018 („Peace of Bautzen“). Bellona, Warszawa 2018, ISBN 978-83-11-15281-6.
- Paryż 885-886 („Siege of Paris (885–886)“). Bellona, Warszawa 2018, ISBN 978-83-11-15518-3.
- Bitwy Słowian. Bellona, Warszawa 2018, ISBN 978-83-11-15537-4.
- Die Piasten und die Anfänge des polnischen Staates. Parthas Verlag, Berlin 2018, ISBN 978-3-86964-101-0.
- Kijów 1018. Bellona, Warszawa 2019, ISBN 978-83-11-15617-3.
- Ulm 1805. Bellona, Warszawa 2019, ISBN 978-83-11-15679-1.
- Konungahella 1135. Bellona, Warszawa 2020, ISBN 978-83-11-15876-4.
- Rugia 1168. Bellona, Warszawa 2021, ISBN 978-83-11-16071-2.
- Fontenoy 841. Bellona, Warszawa 2022, ISBN 978-83-11-16491-8.

=== Short stories ===
- war jewesen, West-Berlin 1961–1989 (Unvorstellbar ist, was man erlebt). Parthas Verlag, Berlin 2009, ISBN 978-3-86964-014-3.

=== Others ===
- Stanisław Lem: Der Widerstand der Materie – Ausgewählte Briefe. Hrsg. von Robert F. Barkowski. Parthas Verlag, Berlin 2008, ISBN 978-3-86601-475-6.
