= Adhemar of Capua =

Adhemar was the Duke of Spoleto from 998 and Prince of Capua from 1000. Before his death, he lost both domains. He is not mentioned as duke of Spoleto after December 999.

== Biography ==
He was the son of Balsamo, a Capuan cleric. He was educated at the court of Otto II, alongside the future emperor Otto III.

In order to break the power of Hugh the Great, margrave of Tuscany, who had become duke of Spoleto, Otto III appointed one Conrad as duke in May 996. In December 998, Otto appointed his childhood companion Adhemar as duke. Otto then took him south and they marched on Capua, where Laidulf, the reigning prince, was removed from his position for the assassination of his brother. They then marched on Naples and took Duke John IV captive to Capua. Laidulf, along with his wife Maria and Gaideris and Lando of Caiazzo, were exiled from the city and Adhemar was left in charge. John of Naples was taken back by Otto to Germany. In 1000, Adhemar was named prince and entered Capua on 11 March. By July he was removed by the Capuans, who elected Landulf of Sant'Agata instead. As prince, however, he did create Atenulf as count of Aquino, thus inaugurating that dynasty.

== Notes ==
Italian nobility
Preceded by Conrad	Duke of Spoleto; 998 – 999	Vacant Title next held by Romanus
Preceded by Laidulf	Prince of Capua; 1000	Succeeded by Landulf VII
