= Atenulf =

Atenulf (Italian: Atenolfo or Atinolfo) is a masculine given name of Lombardic origin. It may refer to:

- Atenulf I of Benevento (r. 899–910)
- Atenulf II of Benevento (r. 910–940)
- Atenulf III of Benevento (r. 933–943)
- Atenulf I of Gaeta (r. 1045–1062)
- Atenulf II of Gaeta (r. 1062–1064)
- Atenulf (abbot of Montecassino) (r. 1011–1022)
- Atenulf, brother of Pandulf III of Benevento (fl. 1040–1042)
- Atinolfo, bishop of Fiesole (r. 1038–1057)
