= Landolfi =

Landolfi is an Italian surname, which is derived from the given name Landolfo or Landulf, which in turn is composed of the German words land ("land") and wulf ("wolf"). The name may refer to:

- Carlo Ferdinando Landolfi (1714–1787), Italian luthier
- Lino Landolfi (1925–1988), Italian cartoonist
- Mario Landolfi (born 1959), Italian politician
- Tommaso Landolfi (1908–1979), Italian writer
- Idolina Landolfi, Italian novelist
- Juan Landolfi (1914–?), Argentine footballer
