= Battle of Stilo =

982 battle between the Holy Roman Empire and the Emirate of Sicily

Coordinates: 39°01′31.60″N 17°12′07.80″E

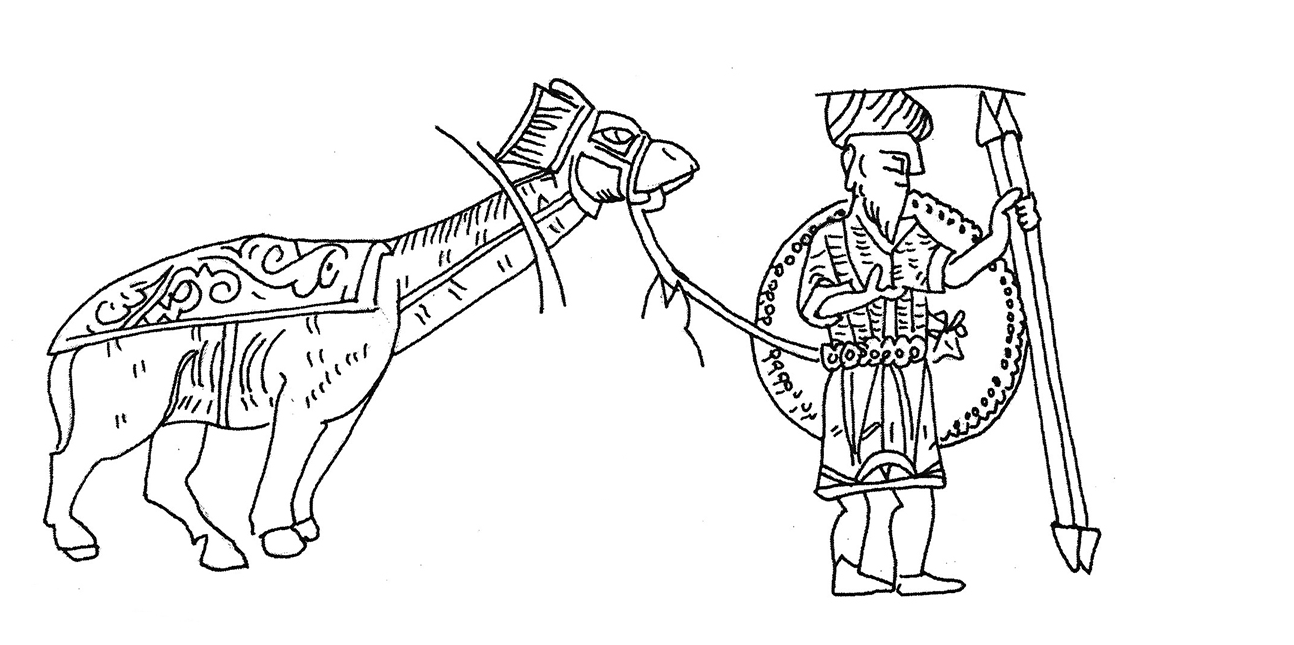
- Warrior of the Fatimid / Kalbid period 11th century Sicily
| Date | 14 July 982 |
| Location | Capo Colonna, near Crotone, Italy |
| Result | Fatimid-Sicilian victory |

Belligerents
| Holy Roman Empire; Principality of Benevento | Fatimid Caliphate: Emirate of Sicily |

Commanders and leaders
| Emperor Otto II; Landulf IV of Benevento †; Pandulf II of Salerno † | Emir Abu'l-Qasim † |

Strength
| 2,100+ armored cavalry, the rest unknown | Unknown |

Casualties and losses
| 4,000 killed including many nobles | Fewer than Imperial army |

The Battle of Stilo (also known as the Battle of Cape Colonna and the Battle of Crotone) was fought on 13 or 14 July 982 near Crotone in Calabria between the forces of Holy Roman Emperor Otto II and his Italo-Lombard allies and those of the Kalbid emir of Sicily (part of the Fatimid Caliphate), Abu'l-Qasim, who had declared a holy war against the Germans.

German forces of the Holy Roman Empire had been moving south in Italy nominally to repulse the Arab threat to the southern provinces, after a short pause for reinforcements from Germany, but also to seize Byzantine territory in the region, with the Byzantines and Arabs devolping a sort of alliance against the Germans: it appears virtually every Bishop and Noble in Germany had joined Otto in his attempt to repulse the Arabs. Abu’l-Qasim had recently captured the last areas in the vicinity of Messina still controlled by the Byzantines, who were forced to cross the Strait of Messina to the Italian mainland. Abu’l-Qasim crossed the strait and sent a Muslim force into Byzantine Apulia to raid the Byzantines, which clashed with Otto II’s advancing German force; the Muslims were forced to retreat. Abu’l-Qasim’s main force reached the area near Crotone in Calabria shortly after, and the main battle between the forces commenced. Despite initially suffering severe losses and losing their commander and seemingly on the verge of defeat, the Muslims were able to regroup and the battle ended in a Fatimid-Sicilian victory; a rare achievement in the Medieval period.

== Pitched battle ==
Abu'l-Qasim was not far from Rossano Calabro when he noticed the unexpected strength of Otto's troops and retreated. Tipped off to the retreat by ships, Otto left his wife Theophanu and their children in Rossano, along with the baggage and the imperial treasure, and set off to pursue the enemy. When Abu'l-Qasim recognized that he would not be able to flee, he readied his army for a pitched battle at Capo Colonna, south of Crotone. After a violent clash, a corps of German heavy cavalry destroyed the Muslim center and then pushed towards the emir's guards. Abu'l-Qasim was ultimately killed during the battle, but his troops were not shaken, going on to surround Otto's forces with a hidden reserve of approximately 5,000 cavalry and inflicting heavy losses. According to Ibn al-Athir's history, losses numbered around 4,000, among them Landulf IV of Benevento, Henry I, Bishop of Augsburg, Günther, Margrave of Merseburg, the Abbot of Fulda, and 19 other German counts. Otto was forced to flee the battle, ultimately securing shelter only by swimming out to a Byzantine merchant ship. He then rested in Rossano, only returning to Rome on 12 November 982. Despite their overwhelming victory, the Fatimid-Kalbid army retreated back to Sicily, until four years later the Arabs returned to attack Apulia and Calabria.

== Election of Otto III ==
After fleeing northward, Otto held an assembly consisting primarily of local magnates in Verona. There, he secured the election of his son as King of Italy and called for reinforcements from Germany. Saxon losses in the battle had been the most severe, and Duke Bernard I of Saxony had been heading south to Verona for the assembly, but raids from Danish Vikings forced him to turn back. Otto had sent his nephew Duke Otto I of Swabia and Bavaria north to Germany to deliver the news of the battle at Stilo, but the Duke perished en route. Nevertheless, word did travel, reaching as far as Wessex—a testament to the magnitude of the disaster. Ultimately, Otto would die the next year before being able to resume the campaign in southern Italy.

== Succession in Capua, Benevento, and Salerno ==
The Mezzogiorno was shaken by the battle. With Landulf and his brothers Atenulf and Pandulf II of Salerno having died fighting, the holdings of Capua and Benevento passed on to cadet branches of the Landulfid family—with Salerno ultimately being snatched up by Duke Manso I of Amalfi.

== Consequences in Southern Italy and the Elbe ==
Although the Kalbid troops had been forced to retreat back to the island of Sicily, the Muslims retained a presence in southern Italy, continuing to harass local Greeks and Lombards. Additionally, when the Slavic peoples living on the Elbe heard of the emperor's defeat, they immediately rose up against imperial suzerainty in what would ultimately prove to be a decades-long setback for efforts to Germanize and Christianize them.

Regarding the effect on southern Italy, one author notes: “That Otto II. lost the battle of Cotrone against the Arabs decided that Sicily would stay Arabian and Apulia stay "Roman" (i. e. Byzantine) till the Normans would come, and that there would never be a Saxon/German conquest of southern Italy”. However, Sicily itself would come eventually come under German rule through inheritence.

== Sources ==
- Barkowski, Robert F. (2015). Crotone 982 (in Polish). Warszawa: Bellona. ISBN 978-83-11-13732-5.
- Reuter, Timothy. Germany in the Early Middle Ages 800–1056. New York: Longman, 1991.
