= Willa of Tuscany =

Countess of Ivrea (911/912–970)

Countess of Ivrea
- Tenure: 930–963

Queen consort of Italy
- Tenure: 950–963
- Born: 911 or 912; Arles
- Died: 970 (aged 59–58); Bamberg
- Spouses: Berengar II of Italy
- Issue: Adalbert, King of Italy; Guy, Margrave of Ivrea; Conrad, Margrave of Ivrea; Rozala, Queen of the Franks; Gerberga; Gisela
- House: Boso
- Father: Boso, Margrave of Tuscany
- Mother: Willa of Burgundy
- Religion: Catholic Church

Willa, known as Willa of Tuscany (911/912–970), was a medieval noblewoman. By birth, she was a member of the Bosonid noble dynasty. By marriage to Berengar II of Italy, she was Countess of Ivrea from 930 to 963, and queen consort of Italy from 950 to 963.

== Life ==
Willa was the daughter of Boso, Margrave of Tuscany and his wife Willa of Burgundy. Boso was a grandson of Lothair II, King of Lotharingia via his mother, Bertha, and his elder brother Hugh was King of Italy. Willa of Burgundy was the daughter of Rudolph I of Burgundy and sister of Rudolph II of Burgundy.

Around 930 Willa married Berengar II of Italy. The marriage was arranged by Willa's paternal uncle Hugh of Italy. About 940, however, Berengar led an unsuccessful revolt of Italian nobles against Hugh. Afterwards, he fled to the court of King Otto I of Germany. Although she was heavily pregnant, Willa left Italy, too, travelling through the Alps in the winter to rejoin her husband in Germany.

In 950 when Berengar was crowned king of Italy, Willa became his queen consort. Berengar held Willa in high regard and designated her his consors regni (partner in rule).

The contemporary chronicler Liutprand of Cremona, raised at the court at Pavia, wrote about both Berengar and Willa in negative terms. He included several particularly vivid accounts of Willa's character in his Antapodosis, including that she supposedly committed adultery with her chaplain Dominic, "a small priest, puny in height, soot-coloured, rustic, hairy, intractable, rough, shaggy, wild, uncouth, crazy; rebellious, iniquitous, with a tail-like appendage". In order to avoid discovery, Willa apparently cast spells upon her husband. When Berengar held Adelaide of Italy captive in 951 Willa supposedly mistreated her.

When Berengar was fighting against Otto I, Holy Roman Emperor in the early 960s, Willa and her sons, Adalbert of Italy and Guy of Ivrea were frequently by his side. After Otto deposed Berengar, Willa and Berengar were taken as prisoners to Bavaria. After Berengar's death in 966 Willa retired to a nunnery in Bamberg, where she remained for the rest of her life. The date of her death is not known exactly.

== Marriage and issue ==
With Berengar, Willa had several children, including:

- Adalbert
- Guy
- Conrad
- Rozala
- Gerberga, wife of Aleram of Montferrat
- Gisela, a nun
- Bertha, abbess of San Sisto in Piacenza
