= Conrad of Ivrea =

Margrave of Ivrea from 970 to 997

Conrad Cono(n) (Italian: Corrado Conone) (died 997) was the Margrave of Ivrea from 970 to his death and Duke of Spoleto and Camerino (996–997). He was the third son of Berengar II of Italy and Willa of Tuscany. His elder brothers were Adalbert and Guy, both of whom ruled the march before him. His father made him, possibly, the first Count of Ventimiglia.

According to the Gesta Mediolanensium, Conrad made peace with the Germans under Otto I when his father and brothers did not. For this he was created count of Milan in 957. On 12 September 962, Otto granted land in the counties of Modena and Bologna that had formerly belonged to him and his brother Guy to the bishop of Modena. Otto installed him as margrave of Ivrea in 970, following his abandonment of his brother Adalbert.

Sometime before 987, Conrad married Richilda, daughter of Arduin Glaber, thus confirming an alliance with the neighbouring margrave of Turin. Sometime around 990, he passed Ivrea along to his relative Arduin.
