= Pandulf V of Capua =

Pandulf V was the count of Teano and prince of Capua (1022–1026). That he was related to the ruling dynasty of Capua seems likely, but is uncertain. He was installed at Capua by Pilgrim, Archbishop of Cologne, who besieged Capua and deposed the current prince, Pandulf IV was imprisoned in Germany. The Emperor Henry II officially granted the principality to Pandulf V in 1023 and associated his son John with him as co-prince.

In 1024, at the behest of Guaimar III of Salerno, Emperor Conrad II released Pandulf IV. Guaimar and Pandulf promptly besieged Capua with the help of the Norman mercenary Rainulf Drengott. In 1025, the Byzantine catapan Basil Boioannes, who had been busy on a Sicilian expedition, joined them with a giant force. In 1026, after an 18-month siege, Boioannes negotiated Pandulf V's surrender and granted him and his son John safe conduct to Naples.

In 1027, Pandulf IV, now reinstated, besieged Sergius IV of Naples, who had offered haven to Pandulf of Teano. The city fell and Sergius went into hiding. Pandulf and his son fled to either Rome or "Romania", where he died some years later. John was dead by 1052, when his younger brother Pandulf appears as the "firstborn" among his brothers.

Preceded by Pandulf IV	Prince of Capua; 1022–1026	Succeeded by Pandulf IV
