= List of princes of Capua =

This is a list of the rulers of the Principality of Capua.

== Lombard rulers of Capua ==
=== Gastalds and counts ===
The gastalds (or counts) of Capua were vassals of the princes of Benevento until the early 840s, when Gastald Landulf began to clamour for the independence which Salerno had recently declared. That caused a civil war in Benevento which did not cease for some ten years and by the end of the 9th century Capua was definitively independent.

- ???–663 Thrasimund, as count

...

- 840–843 Landulf I il vecchio
- 843–861 Lando I (son of prec.)
- 861 Lando II Cyruttu (son of prec., deposed)
- 861–862 Pando il rapace (uncle of prec., usurper)
- 862–863 Pandenulf (son of prec., deposed)
- 863–866 Landulf II il vescovo (also Bishop of Capua, uncle of prec., usurper, deposed)
- 866–871 Lambert I di Spoleto (also Duke of Spoleto, unrelated, imposed by Emperor Louis II, deposed)
- 871–879 Landulf II il vescovo (reinstated)
- 879–882 Pandenulf (reinstated)
- 882–885 Lando III (cousin of prec., usurper)
- 885–887 Landenulf I (brother of prec.)
- 887–910 Atenulf I (brother of prec.)
  - 901–910 Landulf III, co-ruler

=== Princes ===
In 910, the principalities of Benevento and Capua were united by conquest (Atenulf's) and declared inseparable. This, and the inevitable co-rule of sons and brothers, causes ceaseless confusion to any historian of the period, even more so to his readers.

- 910–943 Landulf III, co-ruled from 901 (see directly above)
  - 911–940 Atenulf II, co-ruler
  - 940–943 Landulf IV, co-ruler (perhaps from 939)
  - 933–943 Atenulf III Carinola, co-ruler
- 943–961 Landulf IV the Red, co-ruled from 940 (see above)
  - 943–961 Pandulf I Ironhead, co-ruler
  - 959–961 Landulf V, co-ruler
- 961–968 Landulf V, co-ruling with his brother (perhaps to 969, see directly below), also co-ruled from 959 (see directly above)
- 961–981 Pandulf I Ironhead, co-ruling with his brother (see directly above), also co-ruled from 943 (see above), also Duke of Spoleto (from 967), Salerno (from 978), and Benevento (from 961)
  - 968–981 Landulf VI, co-ruler

The Principality of Capua as it appeared in 1000

In 982, the principalities were finally ripped apart by Pandulf Ironhead's division of his vast holdings and by imperial decree, but the chronology gets no less confusing.

- 981–982 Landulf VI
- 982–993 Landenulf II
- 993–999 Laidulf
- 999 Adhemar
- 999–1007 Landulf VII
- 1007–1022 Pandulf II
  - 1009–1014 Pandulf III, co-ruler
- 1016–1022 Pandulf IV, called the Wolf of the Abruzzi
- 1022–1026 Pandulf V, also count of Teano
  - 1023–1026 John, co-ruler
- 1026–1038 Pandulf IV, second time
- 1038–1047 Guaimar, also Prince of Salerno
- 1047–1050 Pandulf IV, third time
- 1050–1057 Pandulf VI
- 1057–1058 Landulf VIII

== Norman princes of Capua ==
These princes were of the Drengot line and served as a counterpoise to the House of Hauteville until it had finally lost all power. The chronology of the rulers of the principality can be confusing due to the rivalry between Robert II and Roger II of Sicily and his sons.

- 1058–1078 Richard I
- 1078–1091 Jordan I
- 1091–1106 Richard II
  - 1092–1098 Lando IV, held Capua in opposition to Richard II
- 1106–1120 Robert I, brother of Richard II
- 1120 Richard III
- 1120–1127 Jordan II, third son of Jordan I
- 1127–1156 Robert II
  - 1135–1144 Alfonso, son of Roger II
  - 1144–1154 William, son of Roger II

To the Kingdom of Sicily, where it became an appanage for second sons:

- 1155–1158 Robert (III)
- 1166–1172 Henry
