= Landulf VIII of Capua =

Landulf VIII was the last Lombard prince of Capua from 1057, when his brother Pandulf VI died, to the conquest of the city in 1058 by Count Richard of Aversa. Landulf was first associated with the rule along with his brother in 1047, when their father, the infamous Pandulf IV, was reinstated as prince for the second time. According to the Catalogus Principum Capuæ, he reigned for twelve years, which would correspond to his rule jointly with his brother from their father's death in 1050 until his final expulsion from Capua.

According to the Annali di Napoli, the city of Capua itself was not fully captured by Richard until 21 May 1062. Landulf was probably forced to surrender the keys to the city to Richard and his son Jordan in 1058, but allowed to continue ruling until 1062. Landulf's sons did not fare well. They were seen by Pope Victor III wandering the countryside of the Mezzogiorno as beggars.

== Sources ==
- Norwich, John Julius. The Normans in the South 1016-1130. Longmans: London, 1967.
- Gregorovius, Ferdinand. Rome in the Middle Ages Vol. IV Part 1. 1905.

Preceded by Pandulf VI	Prince of Capua; 1057 – 1058	Succeeded by Richard I
