= Landulf IV of Benevento =

Italian noble (c. 950–982)

Landulf IV (born c. 950 – died 13 July 982) was the prince of Capua (as Landulf VI) and Benevento from 968, when he was associated with his father, Pandulf Ironhead, and prince of Salerno associated with his father from 977 or 978. In 968, his uncle Landulf III died, which lead to his rise, as Pandulf ignored the rights of Landulf II's son Pandulf II, his nephew, and instead associated his own son with the government.

In 969, Pandulf I was captured in the Battle of Bovino. The strategos of Bari, Eugenius, captured the town of Avellino, besieged Capua, and then Benevento. Landulf's mother, Aloara of Capua and Landulf I, Archbishop of Benevento, took over the government in his name, to defend the city from the Byzantines. In 977, after the Pandulf's release, he joined his father in an expedition in defense of Monte Cassino against the predations of Count Bernard of Alife.

On Pandulf I's death in March 981, the great Lombard principality was divided: Landulf, the eldest son, received Capua-Benevento and Spoleto, and Pandulf, the second son, received Salerno. However, the Emperor Otto II, who was in the Mezzogiorno at the time, fighting the Saracens, dispossessed Landulf of the duchy of Spoleto and gave it to Thrasimund, duke of Camerino and count of Penne. Soon thereafter, Landulf was forced also to recognize the division of Capua-Benevento, which was united since 899. His cousin, the aforementioned deprived Pandulf II, as prince of Benevento, perhaps as an underling. Thereafter, Landulf IV was merely prince of Capua, in which capacity he supported the Cluniac reform and founded the church of San Croce at Caiazzo. He joined his deposed brother Pandulf II in Calabria, where they fought the Saracens with Otto. They both died in the Battle of Stilo on 13 July. He was succeeded by his younger brother Landenulf, who was under the regency of Aloara.

Preceded by Pandulf I	Prince of Capua; 981–982	Succeeded by Landenulf II
Preceded by Pandulf I	Prince of Benevento; 981	Succeeded by Pandulf II
Preceded by Pandulf I	Duke of Spoleto; 981	Succeeded by Thrasimund IV
