= Pandulf Ironhead =

Prince of Benevento and Capua

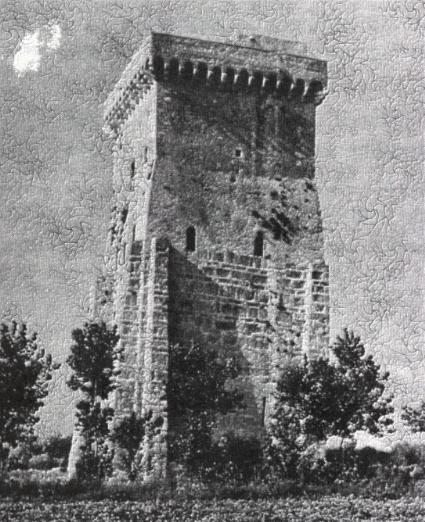
Pandulf's tower on the Garigliano

Pandulf I Ironhead (Italian: Pandolfo Capodiferro) (born c. 925 – died March 981) was the Prince of Benevento and Capua from 943 (or 944) until his death. He was made Duke of Spoleto and Camerino in 967 and succeeded as Prince of Salerno in 977 or 978. He was an important nobleman in the fight with the Byzantines and Saracens for control of the Mezzogiorno in the centuries after the collapse of Lombard and Carolingian authority on the Italian Peninsula. He established himself over almost the whole of the southern half of Italia before his death in March 981. He was an ancestor of Sancho I.

== Co-regency ==
His mother was Yvantia. He co-reigned with his father, Landulf II, from 943, when his grandfather Landulf I died, and with his brother Landulf III from 959. Sometime about 955, Pope John XII led an army of Romans, Tuscans, and Spoletans against Landulf II and Pandulf, but Gisulf I of Salerno came to their rescue and no battle was given. The pope and Gisulf made a treaty at Terracina. Gisulf and Pandulf had a strong alliance after that.

== Sole rulership ==
In 961, Landulf II died and Pandulf and his brother became sole princes, though the elder Pandulf was by far the more domineering. The Chronicum Salernitanum affirms the co-regency, however, and the principle of the indivisibility of the united Capua-Benevento as declared by Atenulf I in 900, when it says Beneventanorum principatum eius filii Pandolfum et Landulfum bifarie regebant . . . communi indivisoque iure, that is "the Beneventan principality was reigned in jointly by Pandulf and Landulf under indivisible common jurisdiction." However, this system eventually collapsed and Pandulf ruled in Capua while Landulf ruled in Benevento. The Chronicum says Pandulf tenuit principatum una cum suo germanus annos octo, that is, "held the principality solely with his brother for eight years."

== Papal patronage ==
Late in 965, a rebellion in Rome overthrew Pope John XIII, who was arrested and carted off to imprisonment in Campania. Whether he escaped or was released, he arrived in Capua not much later, seeking the protection of Pandulf, who gladly gave it. In return, and for the favour of the citizens, he erected Capua into an archdiocese and gave Pandulf's brother John the pallium. After ten months of exile, another revolt in Rome gave opportunity for return and Pandulf sent the pope back with a Capuan escort.

== Imperial favour ==
In 967, the Emperor Otto I came down to Rome and granted Pandulf the vacant Duchy of Spoleto and Camerino and charged him with prosecuting the war against the Byzantine Empire. Pandulf and Landulf introduced Prince Gisulf of Salerno to the emperor at this time. They then took part in the imperial campaign of 968, but Landulf retired in illness and died at Benevento leaving two sons: Pandulf and Landulf. Even though Pandulf Ironhead was with the emperor on the border of Calabria when news of his brother's death reached him, he quickly returned to Benevento and associated with him his own eldest son Landulf, who was crowned prince in the church of Sancta Sophia, before rejoining the imperial campaign. In that year, Otto left the siege of Bari in the charge of Pandulf, but the Lombard was captured in the Battle of Bovino (969) by the Byzantines and jailed in Constantinople. In 970, during his absence, the Byzantines besieged Capua and Marinus II of Naples ravaged the countryside. He was released later in the deal in which the Byzantine emperor John Tzimisces gave Theophanu in marriage to Otto's son Otto II. During his absence, the great principality had been administered by Landulf I, Archbishop of Benevento, and the young Landulf, with help from his mother, Pandulf's wife, Aloara. Benevento had been made an archdiocese in 969.

== Greek failure and Lombard unification ==
In the 960s, Byzantium had been trying to supplant German influence in Salerno and to this end may have engineered the rebellion which temporarily unseated John XIII, a pro-German pope. Prince Gisulf of Salerno, however, was allied both to the Greeks and to his Lombard neighbour Pandulf, whom he had rescued some years before and who was, in fact, staunchly pro-German and anti-Greek. When Gisulf was deposed and removed from office by Pandulf's cousin, Landulf of Conza, in 973, Pandulf restored Gisulf as his vassal. When Gisulf died childless in 977 or 978, Pandulf succeeded in Salerno as per their prior agreement. The policy of the Greeks was a thorough failure and Pandulf (and his Germans) was the winner in southern Italy. He had united all three of the Lombard principalities – Benevento, Capua, and Salerno – and had even gained Spoleto and Camerino. He ruled a large bloc of territories that stretched as far north as Tuscany and as far south as the Gulf of Taranto.

In 978, Pandulf confirmed that the Sanctuary of Monte Sant'Angelo sul Gargano belonged the archbishopric of Benevento. This act was witnessed by two Byzantine officials.

Pandulf's lands were partitioned among his sons, who fought endlessly over the inheritance. His son Landulf IV received Capua and Benevento and Pandulf II received Salerno. Otto II came down to Rome in 981, however, and Spoleto was given to Thrasimund IV, Duke of Camerino. Then, Pandulf's nephew Pandulf was given Benevento in a partition of Landulf's territory, in which Landulf kept Capua. Finally, Manso I of Amalfi dispossessed the younger Pandulf of Salerno and was confirmed by the Emperor.

Pandulf had several other sons: Landenulf, who succeeded Landulf IV in Capua; Laidulf, who succeeded Landenulf; and Atenulf, who died at the Battle of Stilo on 13 July 982.

== Notes ==
Regnal titles
Preceded by Landulf II	Prince of Capua; 961–981	Succeeded by Landulf IV
Preceded by Landulf II	Prince of Benevento; 961–981	Succeeded by Landulf IV
Preceded by Gisulf I	Prince of Salerno; 978–981	Succeeded by Pandulf II
Preceded by Thrasimund III	Duke of Spoleto; 967–981	Succeeded by Thrasimund IV
