= Landenulf II of Capua =

Landenulf II (died 993) succeeded his brother Landulf ΙV as Prince of Capua in 982 and ruled until his assassination. He was one of the younger sons of Pandulf Ironhead.

Landenulf was young and ruled under the regency of his mother Aloara until her death in 992. His brother Laidulf, the count of Teano, incited a group of citizens to revolt and murder him at Eastertime the next year. He was buried on 21 April in San Benedetto in Capua.

| Preceded by Landulf VI | Prince of Capua; 982–993 | Succeeded by Laidulf |
