= Pandulf II of Salerno =

Pandulf II (died 13 July 982) was the prince of Salerno (981), the second of such princes of the family of the princes of Capua. He was originally appointed heir to the childless Gisulf I of Salerno, who had been reinstated on his throne by Pandulf's father, Pandulf Ironhead. On the former's death in 977, he succeeded him as co-prince of Salerno with his father. On the latter's death in March 981, the Ironhead's great principality was divided such that he inherited only Salerno, while Capua-Benevento went to his elder brother Landulf IV.

He was young and was immediately opposed by Manso, Duke of Amalfi, who succeeded in removing him from office and attaining imperial recognition. Pandulf never regained his principality. He joined his brother, whom a revolt had relegated to Capua alone, and they joined the army of Emperor Otto II in Calabria, where both died in the Battle of Stilo against the Saracens on 13 July 982.

Regnal titles
Preceded by Pandulf I	Prince of Salerno; 981–982	Succeeded by Manso
