= Pandulf VI of Capua =

Pandulf VI (also numbered as Pandulf V) (died 1057) was the successor of Pandulf IV as Prince of Capua from his death in 1050 to his own seven years later. He was the son of Pandulf IV and Maria. He co-ruled with his father in the Duchy of Gaeta as early as 1032–1038.

He was a weak ruler under whom the principality declined in importance and influence. Upon his death, his state immediately fell into disarray under his brother, Landulf VIII. Capua itself was conquered within a year by Richard of Aversa.

== Sources ==
- Chalandon, Ferdinand. Histoire de la domination normande en Italie et en Sicilie. Paris, 1907.
- Norwich, John Julius. The Normans in the South 1016-1130. Longmans: London, 1967.

Preceded by Pandulf IV	Prince of Capua; 1050–1057	Succeeded by Landulf VIII
