= Pandulf II of Benevento =

Pandulf II the Old (died August 1014) was the prince of Benevento from 981 and prince of Capua (as Pandulf III) from 1008 or 1009 to his death, and was the son of Landulf III who was co-prince between 959 and 968. Pandulf was first associated as co-prince (in Capua) in 977.

On his father's death, Pandulf was marginalized by his uncle, the reigning Pandulf Ironhead, who gave Capua and Benevento to his eldest son Landulf IV on his death in 981. That year, however, Landulf IV was forced to divide his principality for the first time since 910. Benevento was given to Pandulf II. In May 987, he associated his son Landulf with him in the tradition of the Capuan dynasty begun by Atenulf I.

In 999, Otto III visited the shrine at the Sanctuary of Monte Sant'Angelo on Monte Gargano. On his return through Benevento, he signed a diploma in favor of the monastery of Santa Sofia on 11 March. Santa Sofia was the familial foundation of Pandulf's line and he was buried there in 1014. For reasons unknown, Otto and Pandulf had a falling-out in 1000, possibly over the relics of Saint Bartholomew, patron saint of Benevento, to whom Otto had constructed a new church on the Isola Tiberina—San Bartolomeo all'Isola—just recently. According to the Annales Beneventani, Otto rex cum magno exercitu obsedit Benevento: "King Otto with a large army besieged Benevento." Nothing, however, came of it, except perhaps the yielding of certain relics (possibly the skin of Bartholomew).

Also in that millennial year, the Capuans ousted their imperialist prince, Adhemar, and invited Landulf di Sant'Agata, Pandulf's brother, to be their new prince. In 1003, a rebellion led by Adelfer, Count of Avellino, ousted Pandulf and his son from Benevento. The princes did not remain exiled for long, however. In 1005, they were ruling from their former capital again. The revolt would prove to be a bad sign however, as civil unrest began to rise in the county.

In 1007, Landulf of Capua died and Pandulf Ironhead succeeded him alongside his son, Pandulf II of Capua. In 1011, 1012, or 1013, Pandulf's eponymous grandson, Pandulf III, the son of Landulf IV, was associated with the rule of Benevento. At the request of the monks of Montecassino, Pandulf installed his son Atenulf as abbot in 1011. Pandulf II died in August 1014 and was buried at Santa Sofia.

== Children ==
- Gaitelgrima, married Guaimar III of Salerno
- Maria, married Sergius II of Amalfi
- Landulf V of Benevento
- Pandulf IV of Capua
- Atenulf, Abbot of Montecassino

== Bibliography ==
- Caravale, Mario (ed). Dizionario Biografico degli Italiani: LXIII Labroca – Laterza. Rome, 2004.
- Loud, G. A. (2000). Montecassino and Benevento in the Middle Ages: Essays in South Italian Church History. London: Routledge. doi:10.4324/9781003555650. ISBN 9781003555650.

Preceded by Landulf IV	Prince of Benevento; 981–1014	Succeeded by Landulf V
Preceded by Landulf VII	Prince of Capua; 1008–1014	Succeeded by Pandulf IV
