= Transamund III of Spoleto =

Transamund III (also spelled Transmund or Trasmund) was the Duke of Spoleto and Marquis of Camerino from 982 until his death in 989.

His father was Count Atto I of Chieti (Teate) and Penne. The exact dates of his ducal authority in Spoleto are in dispute and his authority seems to have been interrupted at least once. This interruption has caused confusion as to how many persons with the name Transmund actually governed Spoleto in this era. The Chronicles of Farfa claim that a Transmund succeeded Theobald II around 964, but this appears to be a mis-statement of the chronology. The Chronicles of San Stephano in Rivo Maris refer to a Duke Transmund as early as 971, but this source has been discredited as false. It appears that there was a single Duke Transmund who governed Spoleto on at least two occasions and that he should be referred to as Transmund III. He seems to have died sometime around 989 and was succeeded by Hugh, Margrave of Tuscany.

There are various sources that refer to a Duke Transmund III and Transmund IV. Although it is likely that both are actually Transmund III son of Count Atto II, it cannot be excluded that there were in fact two people with the name Transmund that held the Ducal authority.

Transmund married Sichelgarda and had the following children:

- Gibburga
- Hildebrand, count
- Trasmund II, count
- Atto III, count
