= Laidulf of Capua =

Laidulf (Italian: Laidolfo) was a son, probably the youngest or second youngest, of Pandulf Ironhead (a 10th-century Prince of Benevento and Capua). He probably never expected to inherit much, especially with his many cousins vying for their rightful inheritances. He was the Count of Teano, and was implicated in the assassination of his brother, Landenulf, and the archbishop of Benevento in 993.

He succeeded his brother as Prince of Capua. In 994, he gave Sant'Angelo in Asprano to Manso, abbot of Montecassino and swore to forever defend the abbot's jurisdiction. In 999, the Emperor Otto III came down to avenge the murder of his ally Landenulf. He removed Laidulf from power, took him as a prisoner to Germany, and placed Adhemar on the Capuan throne.

Laidulf may be the father of Gemma, wife of Guaimar IV of Salerno.

Preceded by Landenulf II	Prince of Capua; 993 – 999	Succeeded by Adhemar
