= Landulf VII of Capua =

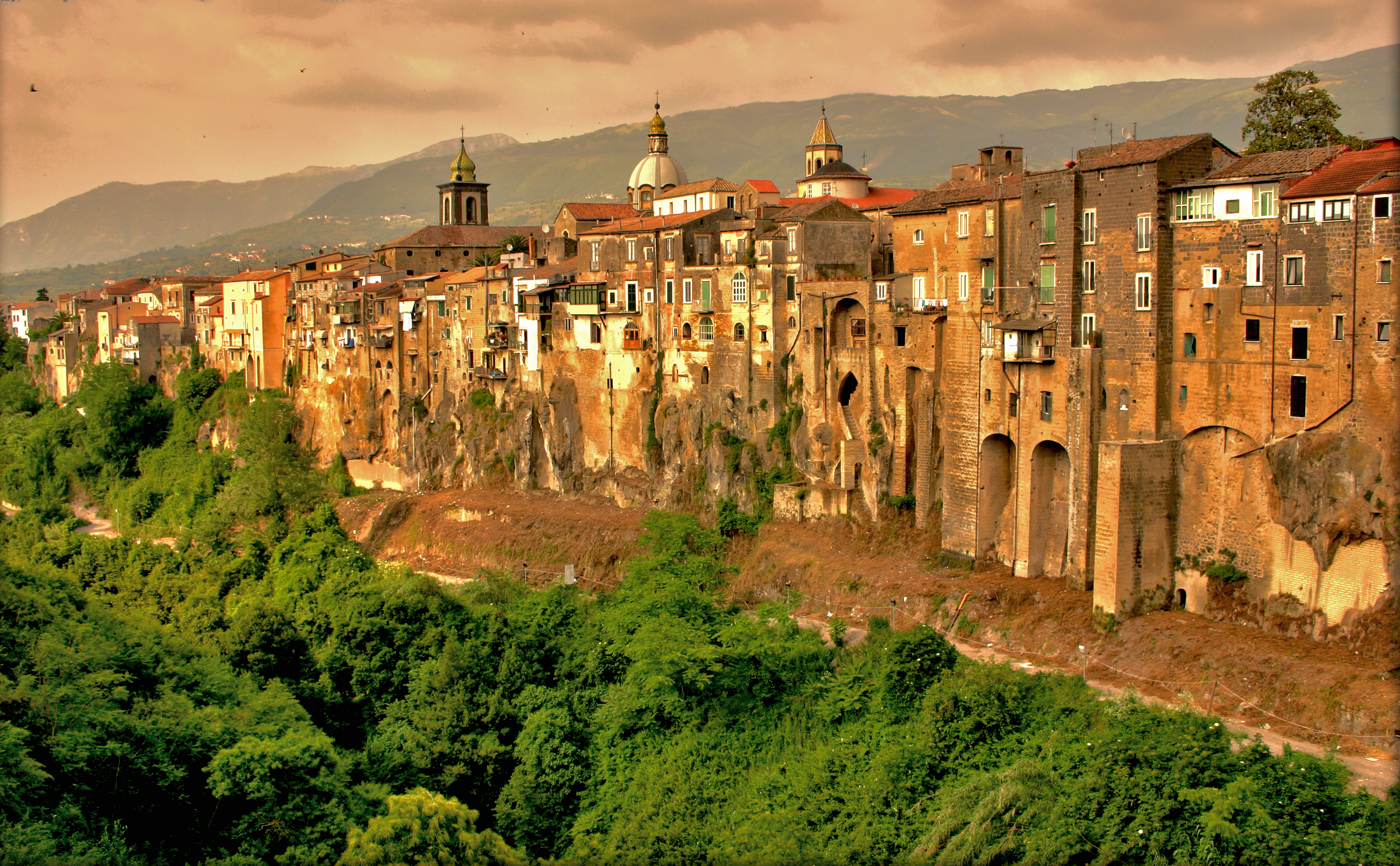
Medieval fortifications of Sant'Agata de' Goti

Landulf VII (died 1007), also numbered Landulf IV or V (if Landulf I and II, who were not princes, are not counted), called Landolfo di Sant'Agata, was the prince of Capua from 1000 to his death. He was the second son of Landulf III of Benevento, who was only a co-ruler. Thus, he was easily removed from the succession on his father's death. His brother Pandulf eventually succeeded in becoming Prince of Benevento.

In 1000, the reigning prince of Capua, Adhemar, was overthrown. The brother of the reigning prince of Benevento was called in. Before he was elevated to princely status, he had been compensated with the county of Sant'Agata de' Goti, the site of a great fortress. Landulf ruled for seven years. He was succeeded by his young son Pandulf II and by his brother, who ruled Capua as regent and prince as Pandulf III.

== Sources ==
- Caravale, Mario (ed). Dizionario Biografico degli Italiani: LXIII, Labroca–Laterza. Rome: 2004.
- Morby, John (2014). Dynasties of the World (2nd ed.). Oxford University Press. doi:10.1093/acref/9780191780073.001.0001. ISBN 9780192518484.

Preceded by Adhemar	Prince of Capua; 1000–1007	Succeeded by Pandulf II
