= Landulf III of Benevento =

Landulf III (died December 968 or 969) was Prince of Capua (as Landulf V) and Benevento from 959 as co-prince with his father, Landulf II, and brother Pandulf Ironhead. In 961, he would be co-prince with only his brother after the death of his father. His mother was Yvantia.

In 961, Landulf II died and Landulf and his brother became sole princes, though the elder Pandulf was by far the more domineering. The Chronicum Salernitanum affirms the co-regency, however, and the principle of the indivisibility of the united Capua-Benevento as declared by Atenulf I in 900, when it says Beneventanorum principatum eius filii Pandolfum et Landulfum bifarie regebant . . . communi indivisoque iure, that is "the Beneventan principality was reigned in jointly by Pandulf and Landulf under indivisible common jurisdiction." However, their co-rulership would eventually come to an end, and the realm would be split, with Pandulf ruling Capua and Landulf ruling Benevento.

In 967, the Emperor Otto I went to Rome and charged Pandulf with prosecuting a war against the Byzantine Empire in Apulia. Landulf took part in the subsequent campaign of 968, but he retired in illness and died at Benevento in either 968 or 969, leaving two sons: Pandulf and Landulf. The Chronicum says Landulf tenuit principatum una cum suo germanus annos octo, that is, "held the principality solely with his brother for eight years." Pandulf, however, cheated his nephews out of their patrimony, made himself sole prince. Both of Landulf's sons would later become princes of Benevento.

== Sources ==
- Caravale, Mario (ed). Dizionario Biografico degli Italiani: LXIII Labroca – Laterza. Rome, 2004.

Preceded by Landulf II	Prince of Capua; 959–968	Succeeded by Landulf IV
Preceded by Landulf II	Prince of Benevento; 959–968	Succeeded by Landulf IV
