= Pandulf II of Capua =

Pandulf II (or III), called the Black (Niger) or the Young, was the son and successor of Landulf VII of Capua in 1007. He ruled jointly with his uncle, Pandulf II of Benevento, who was originally his regent, until the latter's death in 1014.

It is recorded that he ruled jointly with his father, but from what date is unknown. In February 1016, he associated his cousin Pandulf IV with him. Thereafter, he disappears from records.

| Preceded by Landulf VII | Prince of Capua; 1007–1022 | Succeeded by Pandulf III |
