= Lando I of Capua =

Lando I (died 860) was the count of Capua from 843. He was the eldest son and successor of Landulf the Old. Like his father, he supported Siconulf against Radelchis in the civil war dividing the Principality of Benevento in the 840s.

It was Lando who, in early 849, solicited the Emperor Louis II to arbitrate the claims of the two claimants and resolve the ongoing war which had brought Saracen mercenaries to the Mezzogiorno. In Louis's partition, Capua was made part of the Principality of Salerno, but Lando did not long obey Siconulf his overlord. Instead he allied with Duke Sergius I of Naples. To cement the alliance, Lando married his second-eldest son Landulf, the gastald of Suessola, to Sergius' daughter.

During the minorities of Princes Sico and Adhemar, Lando dominated Salerno. The Salernitans took exception to rising Capuan influence and Adhemar called upon Guy I of Spoleto to intervene on his behalf. Lando responded by allying the Prefect Marinus of Amalfi to his side. He even married his brother Pando to Marinus' daughter. In the subsequent war, Guy ravaged the lands and conquered some of the territory of Landenulf, gastald of Teano, Lando's brother, but Lando himself came out unharmed.

In May 859, a massive joint expedition of Salerno, Naples, Amalfi, and Suessola marched on Lando. Lando was in a paralysis at that time and his son Lando II took up arms to defend the city of Capua. He defeated the forces sent against them at the bridge of Teodemondo over the Volturno. Lando did not long survive this great victory. One of his last acts was another marital alliance, this time with Guaifer, a Salernitan nobleman who had found shelter in Capua during the reign of Adhemar. Guaifer married Lando's daughter Landelaica and, upon returning to Capua, seized power with the support of the people.

Lando had moved—against his wishes—the site of Capua definitively from its old location to the new hill of Triflisco in 856. He built a monastery at Teano and died probably in 861 (possibly in 860). He left by his wife Aloara five sons: Lando (II), Landulf (of Suessola), Landenulf, Pando, and Peter; and left a daughter, Landelaica, who married Guaifer of Salerno.

== Sources ==
- Erchempert. Historia Langabardorvm Beneventarnorvm at The Latin Library.

Preceded by Landulf I	Count of Capua; 843–861	Succeeded by Lando II
