= Italy in the Middle Ages =

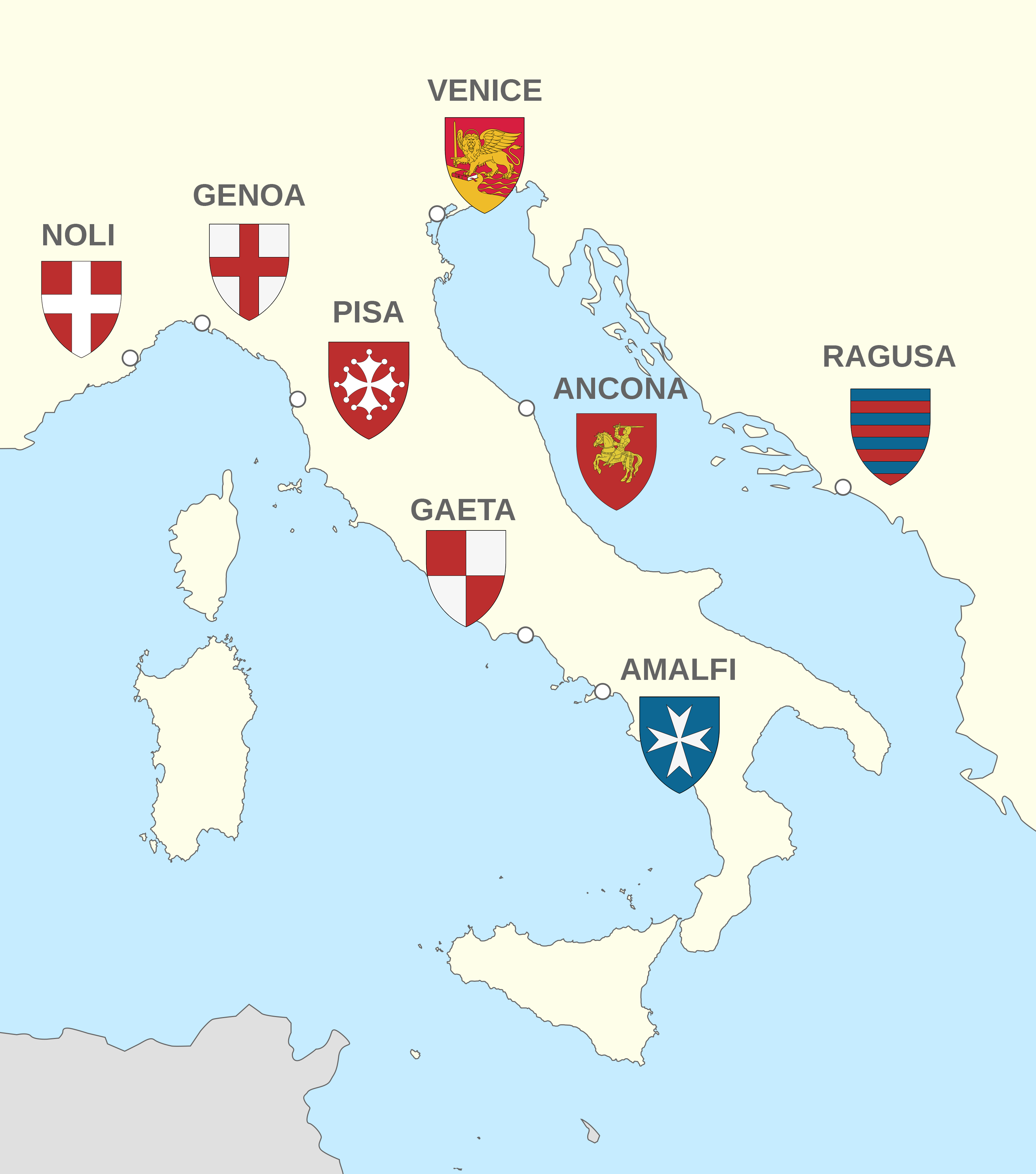
The maritime republics of medieval Italy: Venice, Genoa, Amalfi, Pisa, Noli, Ancona, Ragusa, Gaeta

The history of Italy in the Middle Ages can be roughly defined as the time between the collapse of the Western Roman Empire and the Italian Renaissance. Late antiquity in Italy lingered on into the 7th century under the Ostrogothic Kingdom and the Byzantine Empire under the Justinian dynasty, the Byzantine Papacy until the mid 8th century. The "Middle Ages" proper begin as the Byzantine Empire was weakening under the pressure of the Muslim conquests, and most of the Exarchate of Ravenna finally fell under Lombard rule in 751. From this period, former states that were part of the Exarchate and were not conquered by the Lombard Kingdom, such as the Duchy of Naples, became de facto independent states, having less and less interference from the Eastern Roman Empire.

Lombard rule ended with the invasion of Charlemagne in 773, who established the Kingdom of Italy and the Papal States in large parts of Northern and Central Italy. This set the precedent for the main political conflict in Italy over the following centuries, between the Pope and the Holy Roman Emperor, culminating with conflict between Pope Gregory VII and Henry IV and the latter's "Walk to Canossa" in 1077.

In the 11th century, in the Northern and Central parts of the peninsula, began a political development unique to Italy, the transformation of medieval communes into powerful city-states, many of them, modelled on ancient Roman Republicanism. Cities such as Venice, Milan, Genoa, Florence, Siena, Pisa, Bologna among others, rose to great political power, becoming major financial and trading centers. These states paved the way for the Italian Renaissance and the end of the perceived obscurity of the Middle Ages.

After the three decades of wars in Lombardy between the Duchy of Milan and the Republic of Venice, there was eventually a balance of power between five emerging powerful states, which at the Peace of Lodi formed the so-called Italic League, on the initiative of Francesco I Sforza, bringing relative calm for the region for the first time in centuries. These five powers were the Venetian Republic, the Republic of Florence, the Duchy of Milan and the Papal States, dominating the northern and central parts of Italy and the Kingdom of Naples in the south.

The precarious balance between these powers came to an end in 1494 as the duke of Milan Ludovico Sforza sought the aid of Charles VIII of France against Venice, triggering the Italian War of 1494–98. As a result, Italy became a battleground of the great European powers for the next sixty years, finally culminating in the Italian War of 1551–59, which concluded with Habsburg Spain as the dominant power in Southern Italy and in Milan. The House of Habsburg would control territories in Italy for the duration of the early modern period, until Napoleon's invasion of Italy in 1796.

The term "Middle Ages" itself ultimately derives from the description of the period of "obscurity" in Italian history during the 9th to 11th centuries, the saeculum obscurum or "Dark Age" of the Roman papacy as seen from the perspective of the 14th to 15th century Italian Humanists.

== Transition from Late Antiquity (6th to 8th centuries) ==
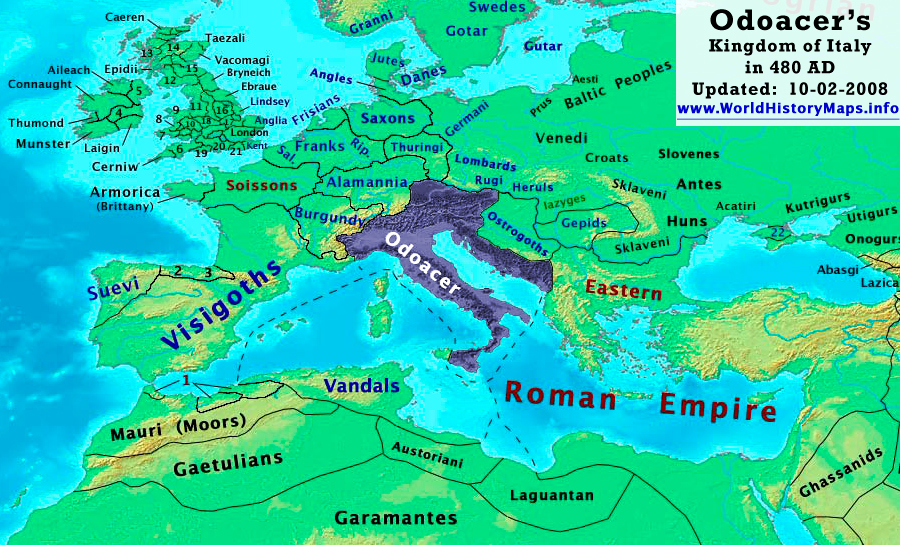
Map of Odoacer's Kingdom of Italy in 480 AD

Italy was invaded by the Visigoths in the 5th century, and Rome was sacked by Alaric in 410. The (traditional) last Western Roman Emperor, Romulus Augustus, was deposed in 476 by an Eastern Germanic general, Odoacer. He subsequently ruled in Italy for seventeen years as rex gentium, theoretically under the suzerainty of the eastern Roman emperor Zeno, but practically in total independence. The administration remained essentially the same as that under the Western Roman Empire, and gave religious freedoms to the Christians. Odoacer fought against the Vandals, who had occupied Sicily, and other Germanic tribes that periodically invaded the peninsula.

In 489, however, Emperor Zeno decided to oust the Ostrogoths, a foederatum people living in the Danube, by sending them into Italy. On 25 February 493 Theodoric the Great defeated Odoacer and became the king of the Ostrogoths. Theodoric, who had lived long in Constantinople, is now generally considered a Romanized German, and he in fact ruled over Italy largely through Roman personnel. The Goth minority, of Arian confession, constituted an aristocracy of landowners and militaries, but its influence over the country remained minimal; the Latin population was still subject to Roman laws, and maintained the freedom of creed received by Odoacer. The reign of Theodoric is generally considered a period of recovery for the country. Infrastructures were repaired, frontiers were expanded, and the economy well cared for. The Latin culture flourished for the last time with figures like Boethius, Theodoric's minister; the Italian Kingdom was again the most powerful political entity of the Mediterranean. However, Theodoric's successors were not equal to him.

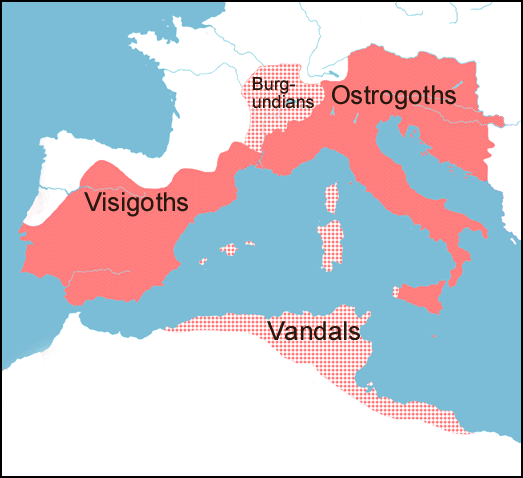
The maximum extent of territories ruled by Theodoric the Great in 523

The eastern half of the Empire, now centred on Constantinople, invaded Italy in the early 6th century, and the generals of emperor Justinian, Belisarius and Narses, conquered the Ostrogothic kingdom after years of warfare, ending in 552. This conflict, known as the Gothic Wars, destroyed much of the town life that had survived the barbarian invasions. Town life did not disappear, but they became smaller and considerably more primitive than they had been in classical Roman times. Subsistence agriculture employed the bulk of the Italian population. Wars, famines, and disease epidemics had a dramatic effect on the demographics of Italy. The agricultural estates of the Roman era did not disappear. They produced an agricultural surplus that was sold in towns; however slavery was replaced by other labour systems such as serfdom.

The withdrawal of Byzantine armies allowed another Germanic people, the Lombards, to invade Italy. Cividale del Friuli was the first main centre to fall, while the Byzantine resistance concentrated in the coast areas. The Lombards soon overran most of the peninsula, establishing a Kingdom with capital in Pavia, divided into a series of dukedoms. The areas in central-northern Italy which remained under Byzantine control (mostly the current Lazio and Romagna, plus a short corridor between Umbria that connected them, as well as Liguria) became the Exarchate of Ravenna. Southern Italy, with the exception of Apulia, current Calabria and Sicily, were also occupied by the two semi-independent Lombard duchies of Spoleto and Benevento. Under the imperial authority remained also much of the ports, which eventually turned into actually independent city-states (Genoa, Pisa, Venice, Amalfi).

=== Rise of the Patriarchate of Rome ===
The Kingdom of the Lombards (blue) at its greatest extent, under King Aistulf (749–756)

The Church (and especially the bishop of Rome, by now styled the pope), had played an important political role since the time of Constantine.

In the politically unstable situation after the fall of the western empire, the Church often became the only stable institution and the only source of learning in Western Europe. Even the barbarians had to rely on clerics in order to administer their conquests. Furthermore, the Catholic monastic orders, such as the Benedictines had a major role both in the economic life of the time, and in the preservation of classical culture (although in the east the Greek authors were much better preserved).

After the Lombard invasion, the popes were nominally subject to the eastern emperor, but often received little help from Constantinople, and had to fill the lack of stately power, providing essential services (ex. food for the needy) and protecting Rome from Lombard incursions; in this way, the popes started building an independent state.

== Early Middle Ages (8th to 9th centuries) ==
=== Collapse of the Exarchate ===
At the end of the 8th century the popes definitely aspired to independence, and found a way to achieve it by allying with the Carolingian dynasty of the Franks: the Carolingians needed someone who could give legitimacy to a coup against the powerless Merovingian kings, while the popes needed military protection against the Lombards.

In 751 the Lombards seized Ravenna and the Exarchate of Ravenna was abolished. This ended the Byzantine presence in central Italy (although some coastal cities and some areas in south Italy remained under Byzantine control until the 11th century). Facing a new Lombard offensive, the papacy appealed to the Franks for aid. In 756 Frankish forces defeated the Lombards and gave the papacy legal authority over all of central Italy, thus creating the Papal States. However, the remainder of Italy stayed under Lombard (such as Benevento and Spoleto) or Byzantine (such as Calabria, Apulia and Sicily) control.

=== The Frankish (Carolingian) Empire ===
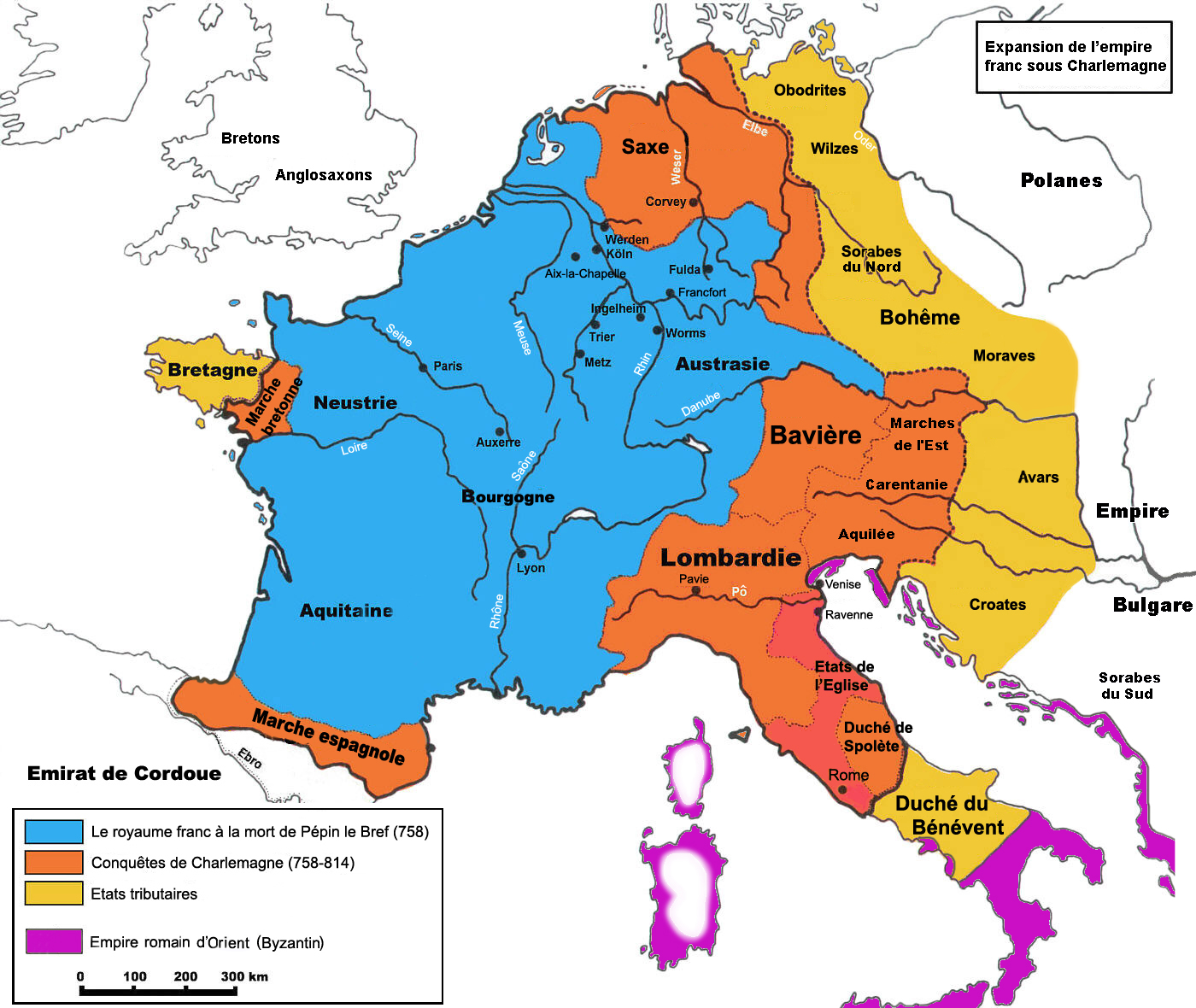
Expansion of the Frankish Empire: Blue = realm of Pippin III in 758, Orange = expansion under Charlemagne until 814, Yellow = marches and dependencies

In 774, upon a Papal invitation, the Franks invaded the Kingdom of Italy and finally annexed the Lombards; as a reward the Frankish king Charlemagne received papal support. Later, on 25 December 800, Charlemagne was also crowned emperor of the Holy Roman Empire by the pope, triggering controversy and disputes over the Roman name. A war between the two empires soon followed; in 812 the Byzantines agreed to recognize the existence of two Roman Empires in return for an assurance that the remaining Byzantine possessions in Italy would be uncontested.

Throughout this period, some coastal regions, and all of southern Italy, remained under Byzantine or Lombard control. The imperial authority never extended much south of the Italian Peninsula. Southern Italy was divided amongst the two Lombards duchies of Spoleto and Benevento, who accepted Charlemagne's suzerainty only formally (812), and the Byzantine Empire. Coastal cities like Gaeta, Amalfi, Naples on the Tyrrhenian Sea, and Venice on the Adriatic Sea, were enclaves who were becoming increasingly independent of Byzantium. A conquest of Benevento, otherwise, would have meant the total encompassment of the Papal territories, and probably Charlemagne thought it was good for his relationships with the Pope to avoid such a move. The age of Charlemagne was one of stability for Italy, though it was generally dominated by non-Italian interests. The separation with the Eastern world continued to increase. Leo III was the first Pope to date his Bulls from the year of Charlemagne's reign (795) instead of those of Byzantine emperors. This process of isolation from the Eastern Empire and connection with the Western world of France and Germany, which had started three centuries before, was completed at the beginning of the 9th century. Sicily, Calabria, Puglia and Venice were the main exceptions to this rule.

After the death of Charlemagne (814) the new empire soon disintegrated under his weak successors. The equilibrium created through the great emperor's charisma fell apart. This crisis was due also to the emergence of external forces, including the Saracen attacks and the rising power of the marine republics. Charlemagne had announced his division of the Empire in 806: the Lombard-Frank reign, together with Bavaria and Alamannia, was to be handed over to his son Pepin of Italy.

After Charlemagne's son Louis the Pious died in 840, the treaty of Verdun in 843 divided the empire. Louis' eldest surviving son, Lothair I, became Emperor and ruler of the Central Franks. His three sons in turn divided this kingdom between them, and Northern Italy became the Kingdom of Italy under Louis II, Holy Roman Emperor in 839.

The first half of the 9th century saw other troubles for Italy as well. In 827, Muslim Arabs known as Aghlabids invaded and conquered Sicily; their descendants, the Kalbids, ruled the island until 1053. In 846, Muslim Arabs invaded Rome, looted St. Peter's Basilica, and stole all the gold and silver in it. In response, Pope Leo IV started building the Leonine walls of the Vatican City in 847; they were completed in 853. In the late 9th century, the Byzantines and the Franks launched a joint offensive against the Arabs in southern Italy.

=== Southern Italy ===
With Charlemagne's conquest of 774, the north of Italy was politically separated from the south completely. Though the Byzantines had continued to hold most of Apulia and Calabria and the Lombard duchies of the south had been aloof of Pavian policies for a century, the situation was exacerbated by the loss of a centralising Lombard authority in the north.

==== Creation of independent moieties (774–849) ====
Under Arechis II of Benevento and his successors, it was the Beneventan policy to pay homage to the Carolingian emperors but ignore their rulings. As a result, De facto independence was achieved from Frankish as well as Byzantine authority. The Duchy of Benevento reached its territorial peak under Sicard in the 830s. At his time, the Mezzogiorno was suffering the ravages of the Saracens, against whom Sicard warred constantly. He also warred against his Byzantine neighbours, especially Sorrento, Naples, and Amalfi. It was in a war with Naples that Duke Andrew II first called in Saracen mercenaries.

In 839, Sicard was assassinated, and a civil war broke out, which illustrated the nature of political power in the south. It was still largely in the hands of the land-owning aristocracy, who had the power to choose a prince. In 839, some chose Radelchis I, the treasurer and assassin, and some chose Siconulf of Salerno, who was installed at Salerno. This civil war continued apace for a decade, during which the gastaldates of Benevento took the opportunity to entrench their independence, especially Capua, which sided with Siconulf. In 849, the Emperor Louis II, in one of his first acts as King of Italy, invaded the peninsula and imposed peace between the Lombard factions. He divided the principality into two: one at Benevento, one at Salerno. Thenceforward, the history of the Lombard south is one of declining, competing powers.

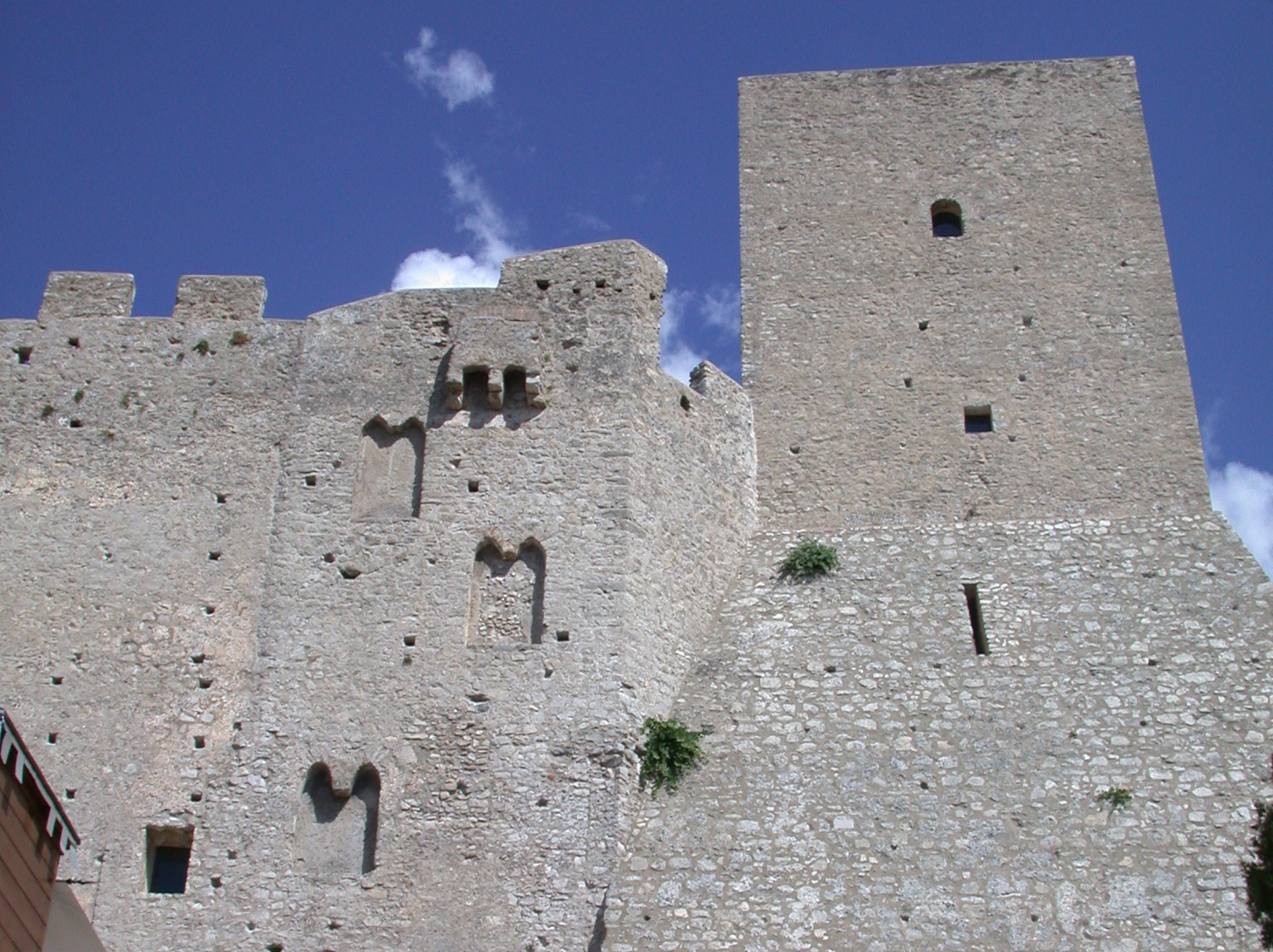
Castle of Itri, probably dating from Docibilis I's reign

In the Tyrrhenian Greek cities, the violence raging inland, between them and their fellow Greeks on toe and heel, fostered the circumstances of de facto independence. Naples, in particular, had a history of differences with Byzantium and had in the past sought to make herself dependent on other authorities, often papal. In 801, the Byzantine patrician of Sicily succeeded in creating Anthimus duke. However, Anthimus was unable to control the cities under his rule, Gaeta and Amalfi. Subsequent to Anthimus, the patrician tried to appoint his own candidate without imperial approval. The people rebelled and accepted Stephen III in 821. During Stephen's decade of rule, Naples severed all legal ties to Constantinople and even began minting her own coins. In 840, after a brief flirtation with Frankish servitude, to Lothair I, and a Frankish duke, in the person of Duke Contard, the Neapolitan citizenry elected Sergius I their magister militum. Sergius established a dynasty, the Sergi, that was to rule the duchy for the next three hundred years.

In Gaeta, as in Naples, the violent situation inland required new power structures to maintain Byzantine authority. The Gaetans received their first imperial Byzantine hypati around the time of the Beneventan civil war. While the first hypati remained Byzantine loyals, in 866, the sudden appearance of a new dynasty under Docibilis I represented Gaeta's move from Byzantium towards independence. The first elected ruler of Amalfi was a prefect appearing in 839, simultaneous with the death of Sicard and the appearance of a Gaetan hyaptus. However, Naples, Gaeta, Amalfi, the Tyrrhenian cities, and Venice (in North Italy) retained some allegiance to Byzantium until the 11th century-long after becoming de facto independent.

==== Period of confusion (849–915) ====
The period following the Beneventan civil war was one of confusion, brought on by the independence movements in the various cities and provinces and by the Saracen onslaught. In Salerno, a palace coup removed Siconulf's successor Sico II in 853 and destabilised that principality until a new dynasty, the Dauferidi, came to power in 861.

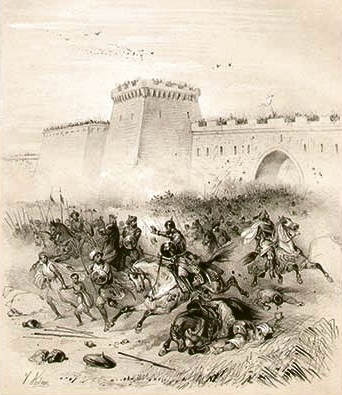
Louis II at the capture of Bari, 871, from Houze's Atlas Universel Historique et Geographique (1850)

In 852, the Saracens took Bari and founded an emirate there. Greek power being significantly threatened, as well as Adriatic commerce, the Byzantine emperor requested an alliance from Louis II of Italy. Similarly, the new prince of Benevento, Adelchis, an independent-minded ruler, also sought his aid. Louis came down and retook Bari in 871 after a great siege. Louis then tried to set up greater control over all the south by garrisoning his troops in Beneventan fortresses. The response of Adelchis to this action was to imprison and rob the emperor while he was staying the princely palace at Benevento. A month later, the Saracens had landed with a new invasive force and Adelchis released Louis to lead the armies against it. Adelchis forced Louis to vow never to re-enter Benevento with an army or to take revenge for his detention. Louis went to Rome in 872 and was released from his oath by Pope Adrian II on 28 May. His attempts to punish Adelchis were not very successful. Adelchis vacillated between nominal fealty to the Carolingian and Byzantine emperors, but, in fact, by his alterations to the Edictum Rothari, he acknowledged himself as the legitimate Lombard "king."

The successors of Adelchis were weak and the principality of Benevento declined just as Salernitan power was beginning to make itself felt. Guaifer of Salerno was on friendly terms with the Saracens, a habit which annoyed the popes and often put a ruler at odds with his neighbours. The south Italian lords continually rotating in their allegiances. Guaifer's successor, Guaimar I, made war on the Saracens. Guaifer had originally associated Guaimar with him as co-ruler, a practice which became endemic to the south and was especially evident in Capua.

== Italian states from the 10th century ==
=== The Holy Roman Empire ===
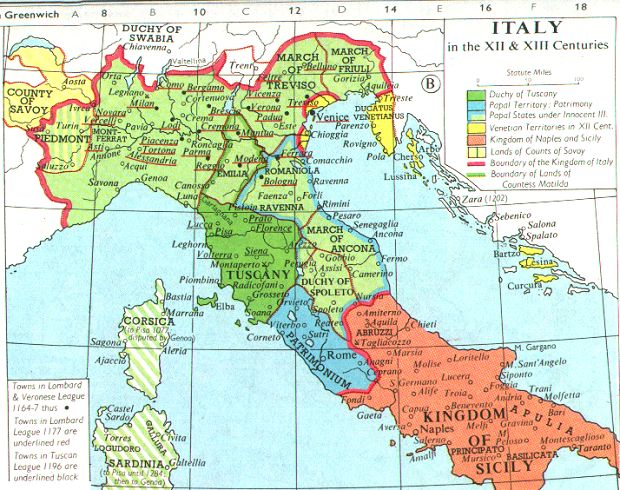
Medieval Kingdom of Italy, outlined in red, in the 12th and 13th centuries

In 951 King Otto I of Germany had married Adelaide of Burgundy, the widow of late King Lothair II of Italy. Otto assumed the Iron Crown of Lombardy at Pavia despite his rival Margrave Berengar of Ivrea. The thrones of Italy and Germany were united. When in 960 Berengar attacked the Papal States, King Otto, summoned by Pope John XII, conquered the Kingdom of Italy and on 2 February 962 had himself crowned Holy Roman Emperor at Rome, reviving the empire of Charlemagne. From that time on, the kings of Italy were always also kings of Germany, and Italy thus became a constituent kingdom of the Holy Roman Empire, along with the Kingdom of Germany (regnum Teutonicorum) and – from 1032 – Burgundy. The German king (Rex Romanorum) would be crowned by the Archbishop of Milan with the Iron Crown in Pavia as a prelude to the visit to Rome to be crowned Emperor by the Pope.

The Emperor, or his subordinate ruler of the Kingdom of Italy, nominally controlled the Northern Italian communes. In general, the monarch was an absentee, spending most of his time in Germany and leaving the Kingdom of Italy with little central authority. There was also a lack of powerful landed magnates – the only notable one being the Margraviate of Tuscany, which had wide lands in Tuscany, Lombardy, and the Emilia, but which failed due to lack of heirs after the death of Matilda of Canossa in 1115. This left a power vacuum – increasingly filled by the papacy and by the bishops, as well as by the increasingly wealthy Italian cities, which gradually came to dominate the surrounding countryside. The papacy went through an age of decadence, which ended only in 999 when emperor Otto III selected Silvester II as pope.

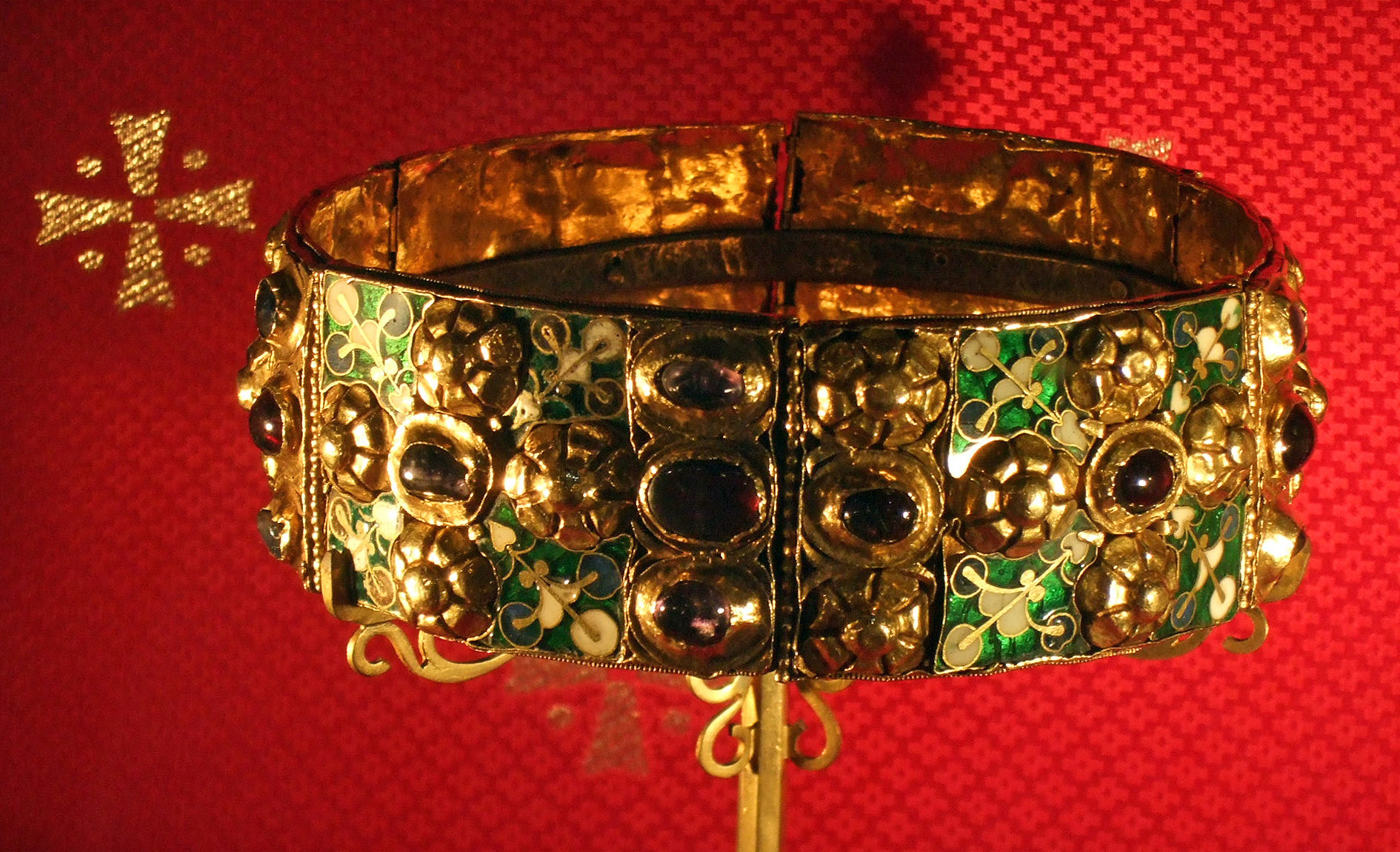
The Iron Crown of Lombardy, for centuries a symbol of the kings of Italy

Upon the death of Emperor Otto III in 1002, one of late Berengar's successors, Margrave Arduin of Ivrea, even succeeded in assuming the Italian crown and in defeating the imperial forces under Duke Otto I of Carinthia. Not until 1004 could the new German King Henry II of Germany, by the aid of Bishop Leo of Vercelli, move into Italy to have himself crowned rex Italiae. Arduin ranks as the last domestic "King of Italy" before the accession of Victor Emmanuel II in 1861.

Henry's Salian successor Conrad II tried to confirm his dominion against Archbishop Aribert of Milan and other Italian aristocrats (seniores). While besieging Milan in 1037, he issued the Constitutio de feudis in order to secure the support of the vasvassores petty gentry, whose fiefs he declared hereditary. Indeed, Conrad could stable his rule, however, the imperial supremacy in Italy remained contested.

=== Southern Italy ===
Under the Macedonian dynasty, Byzantine power experienced a recovery; and the impact of this was felt in southern Italy. During the late 9th century, the amount of territory under direct Byzantine rule (which in the early 9th century was limited to the toe and heel of the peninsula) expanded dramatically. The Catepanate of Italy was set up to administer the newly acquired territory. The rest of Southern Italy remained divided among the Lombard kings and the Italian cities. Both sets of principalities were de facto independent but paid nominal allegiance to Byzantium.

The Southern Italy growth and change stagnated for a number of reasons. In 878 the Arabs captured the crucial city of Syracuse, and by 965 the entire island was under Arab rule. The reminisce of the Lombards laws caused trouble in Salerno. The urban populations were upset with Byzantine taxation, resulting in an uprising in Apulia in the early 980s. In 990, deadly earthquakes directly affected two cities, Benevento and Capua.

=== High Middle Ages (11th–13th centuries) ===
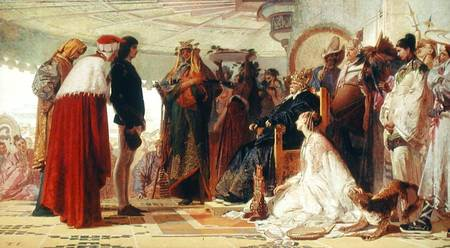
Marco Polo at the court of Kublai Khan (painting by Tranquillo Cremona, 1863)

In the 11th century, the Normans occupied the Lombard and Byzantine possessions in Southern Italy, ending the six century old presence of both powers in the peninsula. The independent city-states were also subdued. During the same century, the Normans also ended Muslim rule in Sicily. Norman rule in what had once been Byzantine territory naturally angered Constantinople, which in 1155 made a last attempt under Emperor Manuel I Komnenos to reassert its authority in Southern Italy. However, the attempt failed, and in 1158, the Byzantines left Italy.

Unlike the Norman conquest of England (1066), which took place over the course of a few years after one decisive battle, the conquest of Southern Italy was the product of decades and many battles, few decisive. Many territories were conquered independently, and only later were all unified into one state. Compared to the conquest of England, it was unplanned and unorganised, but just as permanent.

Thanks to the marriage between the Emperor Henry VI and Constance, heiress to the Sicilian throne, the Kingdom of Sicily was in a personal union with the Holy Roman Empire from 1194 to 1254. The Kingdom of Sicily would last under various dynasties until the 19th century.

Between the 12th and 13th centuries, Italy developed a peculiar political pattern, significantly different from feudal Europe north of the Alps. As no dominant powers emerged as they did in other parts of Europe, the oligarchic city-state became the prevalent form of government. Keeping both direct church control and imperial power at arm's length, the many independent city states prospered through commerce, based on early capitalist principles, ultimately creating the conditions for the artistic and intellectual changes produced by the Renaissance.

Italian towns transitioned out from feudalism, so that their society was primarily based on merchants and commerce. In this era, northern cities and states gained prominence over the south with their merchant republics, especially the Republic of Venice. Compared to feudal and absolute monarchies, the Italian independent communes and merchant republics enjoyed relative political freedom that boosted scientific and artistic advancement.

The southern states' knights and mercenaries were internationally renowned and developed in reaction to the statecraft and knights of the Low Countries, the Kingdom of France, and the Holy Roman Empire.

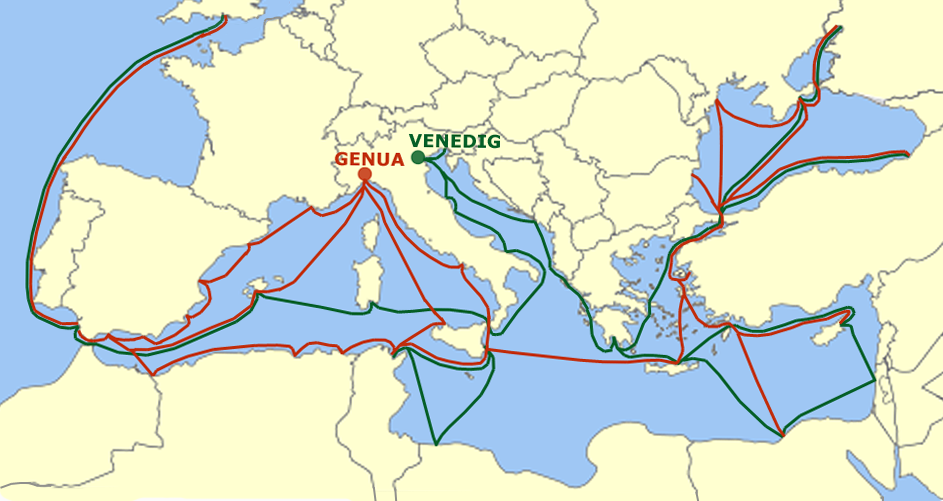
Left: Flag of the modern Italian Navy, displaying the coat of arms of Venice, Genoa, Pisa and Amalfi, the most known maritime republics.
Right: Trade routes and colonies of the Genoese (red) and Venetian (green) empires.

Thanks to their favorable position between East and West, Italian cities such as Venice became international trading and banking hubs and intellectual crossroads. Milan, Florence and Venice, as well as several other Italian city-states, played a crucial innovative role in financial development, devising the main instruments and practices of banking and the emergence of new forms of social and economic organization.

During the same period, Italy saw the rise of the Maritime Republics: Venice, Genoa, Pisa, Amalfi, Ragusa, Ancona, Gaeta and the little Noli. From the 11th to the 13th centuries these cities built fleets of ships both for their own protection and to support extensive trade networks across the Mediterranean, leading to an essential role in the Crusades. The maritime republics, especially Venice and Genoa, soon became Europe's main gateways to trade with the East, establishing colonies as far as the Black Sea and often controlling most of the trade with the Byzantine Empire and the Islamic Mediterranean world.

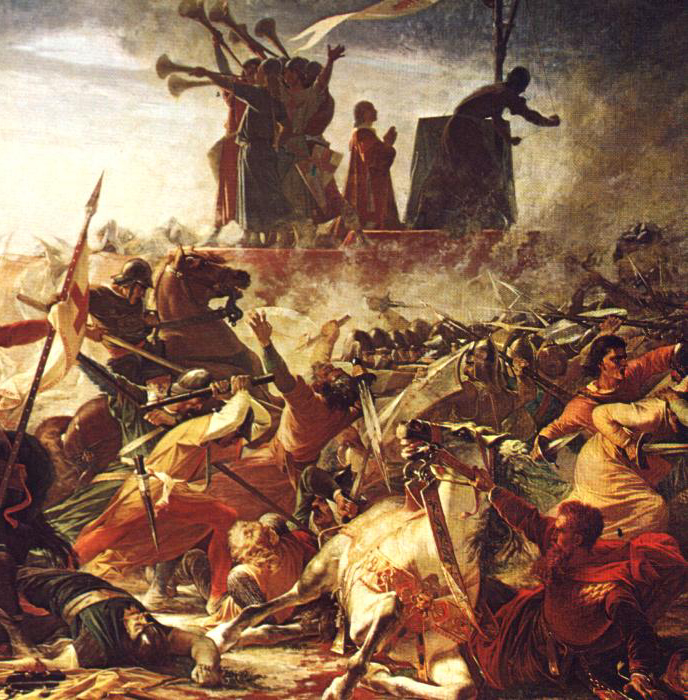
The defense of the Carroccio during the battle of Legnano (by Amos Cassioli, 1860)

The papacy regained its authority, and started a long struggle with the empire, about both ecclesiastical and secular matters. The first episode was the Investiture Controversy. In the 12th century, those Italian cities which lay in the Holy Roman Empire launched a successful effort to win autonomy from the Holy Roman Empire. In the north, a Lombard League of communes launched a successful effort to win autonomy from the Holy Roman Empire, defeating Emperor Frederick Barbarossa at the Battle of Legnano in 1176. This made north Italy a land of quasi-independent or independent city-states until the 19th century (see Italian city-states and history of every city). The revolts were funded by the Byzantine Empire, which hoped to expel the Germanic peoples from Italy; this sponsorship was, like the invasion of the south, part of a 12th-century Byzantine effort to regain the influence it had once held on the peninsula during the reign of Justinian I.

== Late Middle Ages and Renaissance (14th century to 1559) ==
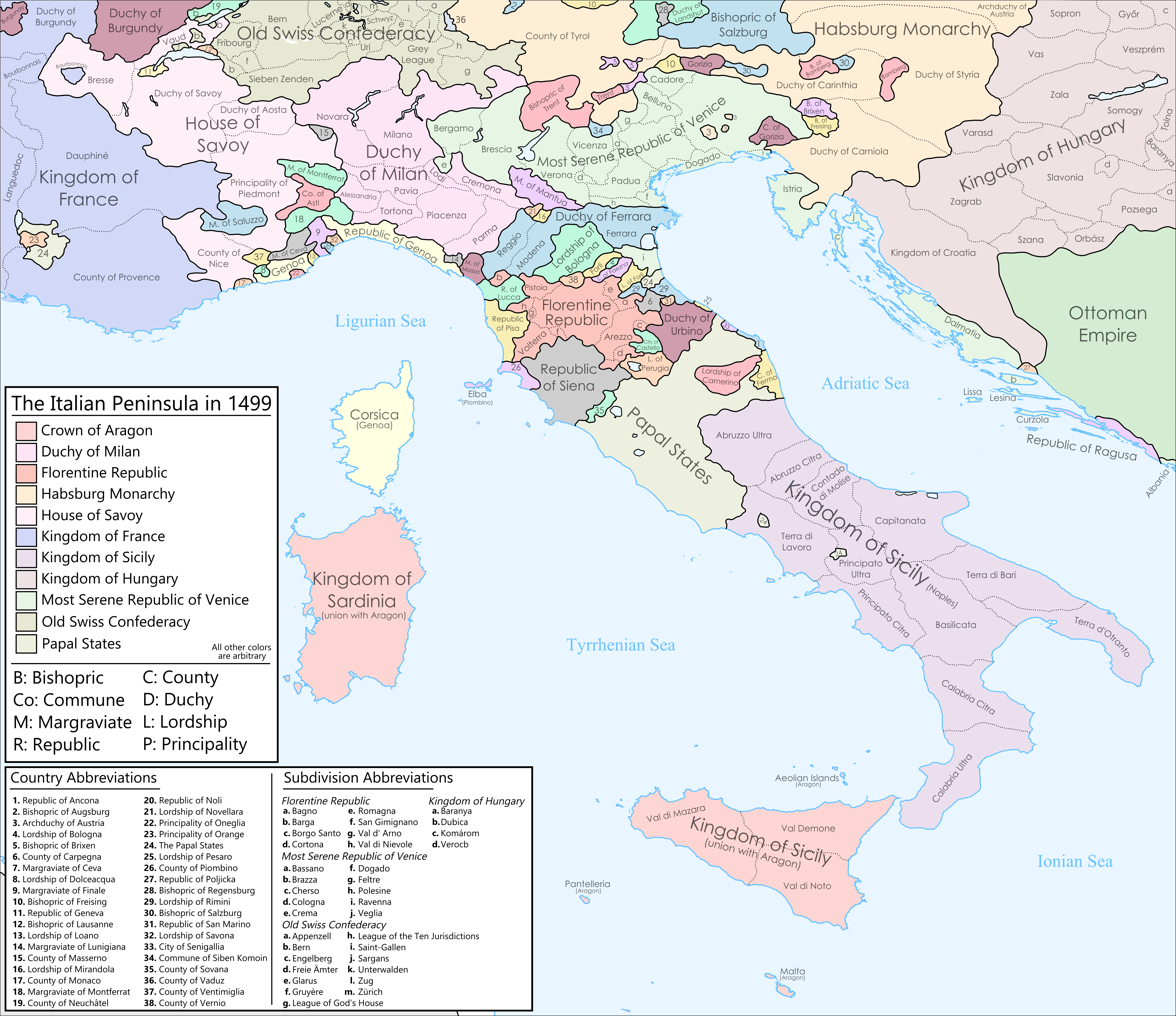
The Italian city-states in 1499

In the 14th century, Northern Italy and upper-central Italy were divided into a number of warring city-states, the most powerful being Milan, Florence, Pisa, Siena, Genoa, Ferrara, Mantua, Verona, and Venice. High Medieval Northern Italy was further divided by the long running battle for supremacy between the forces of the papacy and of the Holy Roman Empire. Each city aligned itself with one faction or the other, yet was divided internally between the two warring parties, Guelphs and Ghibellines. The county of Savoy expanded its territory into the peninsula in the late Middle Ages, while Florence developed into a highly organized commercial and financial city-state, becoming for many centuries the European capital of silk, wool, banking and jewelry.

Warfare between the states was common, invasion from outside Italy confined to intermittent sorties of Holy Roman Emperors. Renaissance politics developed from this background. Since the 13th century, as armies became primarily composed of mercenaries, prosperous city-states could field considerable forces, despite their low populations. In the course of the 15th century, the most powerful city-states annexed their smaller neighbors. Florence took Pisa in 1406, Venice captured Padua and Verona, while the Duchy of Milan annexed a number of nearby areas including Pavia and Parma. The Duchy of Milan found itself in the focus of European power politics in the 15th century, leading to the drawn-out Italian Wars, which persisted for the best part of the 16th century before giving way to the Early Modern period in Italy. In the 14th century, Italy presents itself as divided between the Kingdom of Naples and Sicily in the south, the Papal States in Central Italy, and the Maritime republics in the north.

The Black Plague ravaged Europe during the 1340s–50s, wiping out almost half the continent's population. Particularly detrimental was that most of the victims were young adults in their prime working years, which left behind an "hourglass" population structure comprised heavily of children and older people, with fewer in-between. The widespread belief of medieval Europe having a "pyramid" population where most people were under 45 was not completely true, and in fact varied widely from region to region. France traditionally had high birth rates, but Italy's fertility was lower to begin with and especially after the Plague had ravaged the region, many cities such as Florence, Verona, and Arezzo had populations where more than 15% of people were over the age of 60.

Since overall life expectancy in Europe did not increase by any significant margin during this period, the aging cohort in some areas can be almost completely blamed on the effects of the Plague. Wealthy households had larger numbers of children than the poor. For example, in the early 15th century, the average age of Florence's population among the lower classes was 25 while the upper classes had an average age of just 17. The countryside became swiftly depopulated after the Plague as well due to surviving young people moving en masse to the cities.

The Italian Renaissance originates in 14th-century Tuscany, centered in the cities of Florence and Siena. It later had a great impact in Venice, where the remains of ancient Greek culture were brought together, providing humanist scholars with new texts. The Renaissance later had a significant effect on Rome, which was ornamented with some structures in the new all'antico mode, then was largely rebuilt by humanist 16th-century popes.

Beginning in 1320 an upheaval in the Florentine wool industry began that would see wool textiles become Italy's most important manufacture for export. By the late 14th century Florence rivaled even the Low Countries of Flanders and Brabant and reigned supreme in the marketplaces of the Mediterranean.

During this time, the powers of the ruler of states expanded as some of the last feudal institutions faded away. However, power was also put into the hands of smaller branches of families than the amount that feudalism and later pre-Renaissance political systems allowed for, causing friction and periods of noble hostility against Italian rulers and other noble families.

The Italian Renaissance peaked in the mid-16th century as foreign invasions plunged the region into the turmoil of the Italian Wars. However, the ideas and ideals of the Renaissance endured and even spread into the rest of Europe, setting off the Northern Renaissance, and the English Renaissance.

== See also ==
- Giudicati
- Medieval Corsica
- Italian city-states
- Maritime republics
