= 839 =

Calendar year

839 in various calendars
Gregorian calendar	839; DCCCXXXIX
Ab urbe condita	1592
Armenian calendar	288; ԹՎ ՄՁԸ
Assyrian calendar	5589
Balinese saka calendar	760–761
Bengali calendar	245–246
Berber calendar	1789
Buddhist calendar	1383
Burmese calendar	201
Byzantine calendar	6347–6348
Chinese calendar	戊午年 (Earth Horse); 3536 or 3329 — to — 己未年 (Earth Goat); 3537 or 3330
Coptic calendar	555–556
Discordian calendar	2005
Ethiopian calendar	831–832
Hebrew calendar	4599–4600
- Hindu calendars
Vikram Samvat	895–896
Shaka Samvat	760–761
Kali Yuga	3939–3940
Holocene calendar	10839
Iranian calendar	217–218
Islamic calendar	224–225
Japanese calendar	Jōwa 6 (承和６年)
Javanese calendar	736–737
Julian calendar	839; DCCCXXXIX
Korean calendar	3172
Minguo calendar	1073 before ROC 民前1073年
Nanakshahi calendar	−629
Seleucid era	1150/1151 AG
Thai solar calendar	1381–1382
Tibetan calendar	阳土马年 (male Earth-Horse); 965 or 584 or −188 — to — 阴土羊年 (female Earth-Goat); 966 or 585 or −187

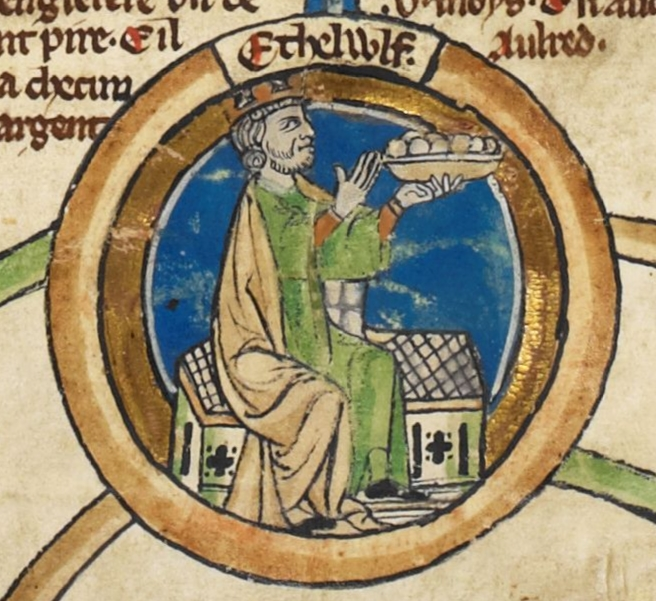
King Æthelwulf of Wessex (839–858)

Year 839 (DCCCXXXIX) was a common year starting on Wednesday of the Julian calendar.

== Events ==
=== By place ===
==== Europe ====
- Prince Sicard of Benevento is assassinated by a conspiracy among the nobility. He is succeeded by Radelchis I, chief army officer and treasurer of Sicard, who proclaims himself ruler of Benevento. He imprisons Siconulf, heir and brother of Sicard, in Taranto. But Amalfitan merchants, led by Landulf I, the gastald of Capua, and with the support of Guaifer, rescue him from prison. Siconulf is proclaimed prince of Salerno, and a civil war erupts, which splits the Lombard principality in Southern Italy.
- Third Civil War: King Louis the German, grandson of Charlemagne, invades Swabia. His nephew, Pepin II of Aquitaine, and his Gascon subjects, conquer territory all the way to the Loire.
- May 20 — Thirteen months before his death, Louis the Pious, successor to his father Charlemagne, consents to the division of Charlemagne's empire among his sons in a declaration at Worms. Upon Louis I's death in 840, Lothair (age 45) is devised Middle Francia that includes Switzerland and northern Italy; Louis the German (Louis II), age 36, receives Eastern Francia that includes much of Germany; and Charles the Bald (17) gets West Francia that incorporates most of France.
- The Hungarians (also known as Magyars) who until this time have lived east of the Carpathians, raid the Lower Danube at the request of the Bulgarian Empire against the Byzantine insurgents.
- Approximate date – Danish Vikings return to ravage the Frisian coast (sacking Dorestad for the second time).
- The first official mention of Andorra is recorded, in the manuscripts of the cathedral at La Seu d'Urgell (modern Spain).

==== Britain ====
- Ecgberht, King of Wessex, dies after a 37-year reign, and is succeeded by his son Æthelwulf ("Noble Wolf") as ruler of Wessex. Æthelwulf's eldest son, Æthelstan, is made sub-king of Kent, Essex, Surrey and Sussex, under his father.
- Battle of 839: Eóganan mac Óengusa, King of the Picts, his brother Bran, Áed mac Boanta, King of Dál Riata, "and others almost innumerable" are killed in a battle fought by the men of Fortriu in Scotland against Vikings. Alpín mac Echdach (Alpín II) apparently succeeds Áed.

== Births ==
- Charles the Fat, Frankish emperor (d. 888)
- He Quanhao, general of the Tang dynasty (d. 870)
- Liu Chongwang, Chancellor of the Tang dynasty (d. 900)
- Muhammad ibn Jarir al-Tabari, Persian scholar (d. 923)

== Deaths ==
- April 21 – Pei Du, chancellor of the Tang dynasty (b. 765)
- June 16 – Rorgon I, count of Maine (or 840)
- Áed mac Boanta, king of Dál Riata
- Aznar Galíndez I, king of Aragon
- Cathal mac Muirgiussa, king of Connacht
- Chengguan, Chinese Buddhist monk (b. 738)
- Cummascach mac Congalaig, king of Brega
- Ecgberht, king of Wessex
- Eóganan mac Óengusa, king of the Picts
- Ibrahim ibn al-Mahdi, Muslim prince (b. 779)
- Muhammad at-Taqi, Muslim ninth Ismā'īlī imam (or 840)
- Muiredach mac Eochada, king of Ulaid
- Sicard, prince of Benevento
- Vache, prince of Kakheti
- Wiglaf, king of Mercia

== Sources ==
- Kirby, D.P. (2000). The Earliest English Kings (Revised ed.). Routledge. ISBN 0-415-24211-8.
- Stenton, Frank M. (1971). Anglo-Saxon England. Oxford: Clarendon Press. ISBN 0-19-821716-1.
