= Lando III of Capua =

Count of Capua, Southern Italy in medieval times

Lando III (died 885) was the count of Capua for two years and ten months from 882 to his death. He was a son of Landenulf, gastald of Teano, and grandson of Landulf I of Capua.

In 879, when Landulf II died, Lando seized Calino and Caiazzo and made his son, Landulf, only an adolescent, bishop of Capua. Pandenulf, however, seized Capua and appointed his brother Landenulf as bishop. Pandenulf recognised Lando in Caiazzo, but a schism began in the Capuan church over the rightful bishop. Pope John VIII decided in favour of Landenulf, but made Landulf bishop of "Old" Capua, Santa Maria Capuavetere.

Lando began building a coalition against Pandenulf. He brought on his cousins the deposed Lando II and Landulf of Suessola and the prince of Salerno, Guaifer. Pandenulf recruited to his side Gaideris, Prince of Benevento, and the Byzantine strategos Gregory. Athanasius of Naples allied with Pandenulf, but after seizing desired land in Liburia, he abandoned the count. Lando and his allies sued for peace, but treacherously seized Capua and exiled Pandenulf and Landenulf, replacing them respectively with Lando and his son.

Lando warred successfully with Lando II, who had hoped to revive his own rule, and Athanasius, who was desirous of more gains in the Capua province. Lando also allied with Guy III of Spoleto against Atenulf, his own brother, the gastald of the Marsi. Erchempert here gives an indication of Lando's character, describing him as too indolent to even take action against his brother, who was then befriending his worst enemy.

Lando died in 885 of natural causes. He had married a daughter of Radelgar of Benevento. He was succeeded by his brother Landenulf.

== Sources ==
- Erchempert. Historia Langabardorvm Beneventarnorvm at The Latin Library.
- Caravale, Mario (ed). Dizionario Biografico degli Italiani: LXIII Labroca – Laterza. Rome, 2004.

Preceded by Pandenulf	Count of Capua; 882–885	Succeeded by Landenulf I
