= Landenulf I of Capua =

Landenulf I was briefly Count of Capua after the death of his brother Lando III in 885. He was a son of Landenulf, gastald of Teano, and grandson of Landulf I of Capua.

He kept his deposed cousin Pandenulf in prison. His entire reign was spent defending himself against the Greeks, led by Athanasius of Naples and the strategos of Bari. The latter sent 300 soldiers under the command of Chasanos, who was recalled to Constantinople, and succeeded by Joannikios. Guaimar I of Salerno was convinced to enter the war on the side of Landenulf, while Landenulf's brother Atenulf had joined the Greeks. Joannikios pillaged Capua and succeeded in liberating Pandenulf, but Atenulf was the victor, displacing his beleaguered cousin and setting himself up as sole Capuan count in January 887.

== Sources ==
- Erchempert. Historia Langabardorvm Beneventarnorvm at The Latin Library.
- Caravale, Mario (ed). Dizionario Biografico degli Italiani: LXIII Labroca – Laterza. Rome, 2004.

Preceded by Lando III	Count of Capua; 885 – 887	Succeeded by Atenulf I
