= John IV (bishop of Naples) =

Italian Catholic prelate

John IV (Italian: Giovanni d'Acquarola or Giovanni Scriba; died 17 December 849), also known as the Peacemaker and John the Serene, was an Italian Catholic prelate. He served as Bishop of Naples from 26 February 842 until his death.

He had the relics of Aspren translated to a chapel in the church of Santa Restituta in Naples. He also assisted Duke Andrew II in negotiating the Pactum Sicardi, an economic treaty, with Sicard, Prince of Benevento.

He was canonized after his death and is one of the patron saints of Naples. His feast day is 22 June.
