= Landulf II of Capua =

Count of Capua, 863–879

Landulf II (c. 825 – 879) was Bishop and Count of Capua. He was the youngest of four sons of Landulf I, gastald of Capua. As a young man, he entered the church. When his father died, his eldest brother, Lando, succeeded him.

On the death of the bishop of Capua, Paulinus, Lando made Landulf bishop of the city. Lando died in 861 and his young son, Lando II was deposed only a few months later by Landulf's other elder brother, Pando. Pando too died soon thereafter (862 or 863) and a succession crisis broke out. Pando's son Pandenulf was shoved aside and Landulf, though bishop, took the Capuan throne in 863. However, the other branches of the family refused to recognize the usurpation and began seizing much of the county for themselves, leaving Landulf II only in control of the town of Capua proper. Isolated, Landulf II invited Saracen mercenaries to ravage the lands of his familiars, a move which much alarmed his neighbors (including the pope).

In 866, the deposed Pandenulf appealed to Emperor Louis II, then visiting Monte Cassino, to act against his uncle. The Emperor promptly besieged Capua and divested Landulf II, but instead of restoring Pandenulf, decided to pass the county of Capua over to the marquis Lambert I of Spoleto. This arrangement did not last long. In 871, Lambert was involved in a rebellion against Louis II orchestrated by Adelchis of Benevento. In the aftermath, Louis II deposed Lambert and restored Landulf II as count of Capua. As a condition, Landulf II swore off deploying Saracens in the county.

Upon the death of Louis (875), who had strictly enforced peace amongst the Christians of the Mezzogiorno, Landulf II allied himself with the Saracens, but in 877, Pope John VIII convinced him to ally himself to the papacy against the Muslims. He spent the next years defending the Amalfi Coast with his navy in return for tribute.

Landulf II died in 879, undisputed count of Capua, and a succession crisis broke out again between his nephews Lando II (son of Lando), Pandenulf (son of Pando) and Lando III (son of Landenulf of Teano).

In the chronicle of Erchempert, of whom he was a contemporary, Landulf II of Capua is the chief villain, portrayed as a dabbler in Satanism and black magic, Saracen ally and enemy of Christendom. Erchempert's portrayal of Landulf II was the inspiration for the character of evil duke and magician Klingsor in Wolfram von Eschenbach's medieval epic Parzival. Eschenbach's epic was later translated into the famous nineteenth-century opera Parsifal by Richard Wagner. As American film director George Lucas is frequently said to have looked to Parsifal for inspiration in his creation of the Star Wars saga, Landulf II of Capua, via this long chain of association, is the closest historical source for the villainous Darth Vader.

== Sources ==
- Erchempert. Historia Langabardorvm Beneventarnorvm at The Latin Library
- Caravale, Mario (ed). Dizionario Biografico degli Italiani: LXIII Labroca – Laterza. Rome, 2004.

Preceded by Pando	Count of Capua; 863–879	Succeeded by Pandenulf
