= Principality of Salerno =

Medieval principality in southern Italy spanning the 9th - 11th Century

Coordinates: 40°41′0″N 14°46′0″E

Principality of Salerno Principatus Lucaniae Occidentalis (Latin)
- 851–1077
- Calvary cross potent motif was usually minted on coins by various princes

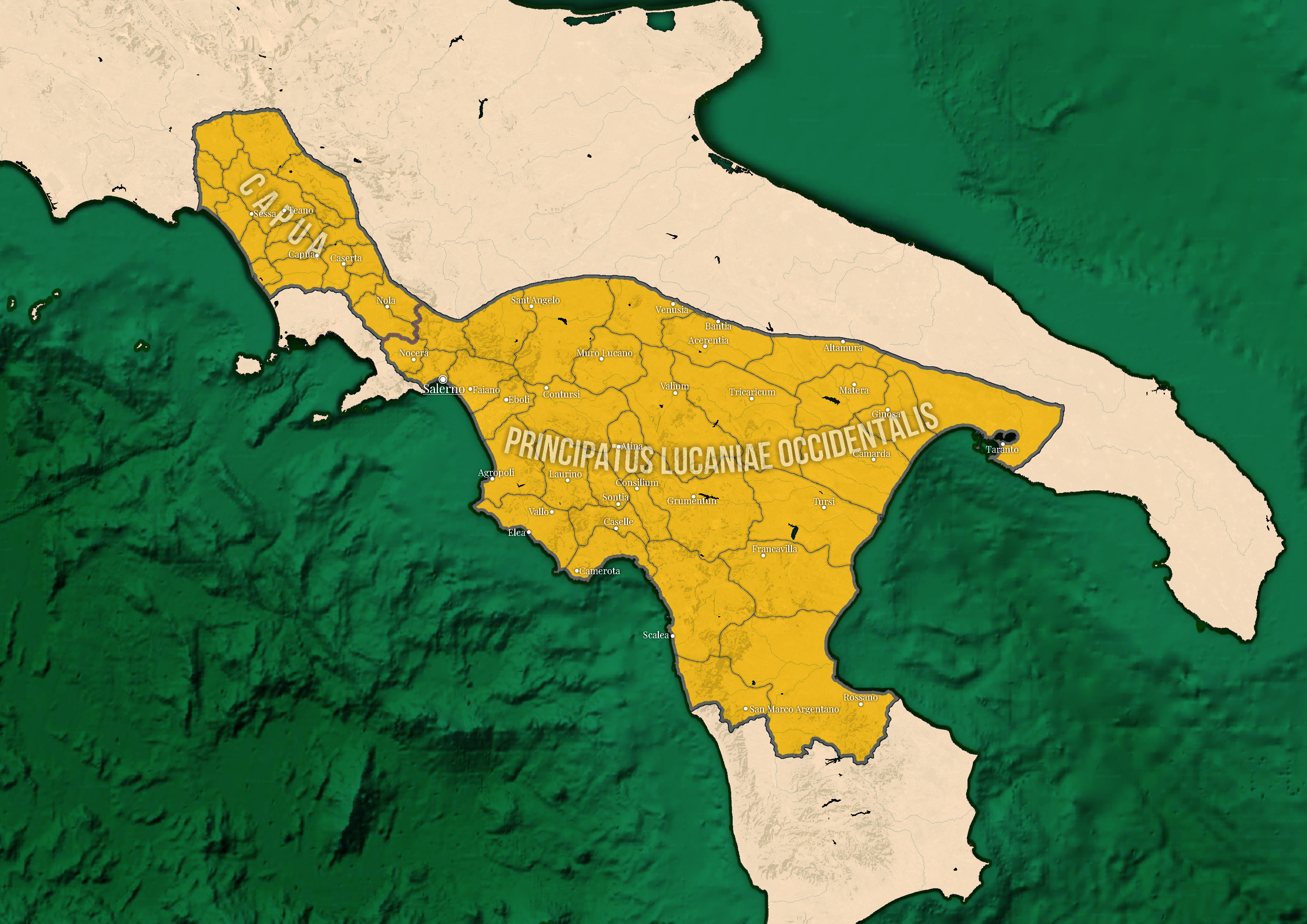
- The Principality of Salerno, in yellow, during the reign of Guaifer in the 9th century.
- Capital: Salerno
- Official languages: Latin
- Religion: Roman Catholicism
- Government: Monarchy
- Prince
  - 840–851: Siconulf (first)
  - 1052–1077: Gisulf II (last)
- Historical era: Middle Ages
  - Emperor Louis II ends a civil war in Benevento by decreeing that the duchy be split into two distinct principates - Benevento and Salerno: 851
  - The principality is under the rule of "foreigners": 978-983
  - The city and principality are conquered by the Normans: 1077
- Currency: Monetazione di Salerno
Preceded by	Succeeded by
Principality of Benevento	Principality of Capua; Kingdom of Sicily
- Today part of: Italy

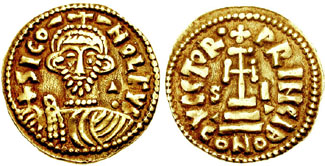
Solidus of the Principality in the 9th century.

The Principality of Salerno (Latin: Principatus Salerni) was a medieval Southern European state, formed in 851 out of the Principality of Benevento after a decade-long civil war. It was centred on the port city of Salerno. Although it owed allegiance at its foundation to the Carolingian emperor, it was de facto independent throughout its history and alternated its allegiance between the Carolingians and their successors in the West and the Byzantine emperors in the east.

== History ==
=== Formation ===
In 839, the prince of Benevento, Sicard, died. Immediately, his chief army officer, Radelchis, seized power in Benevento and imprisoned Sicard's heir and brother, Siconulf, in Taranto. Amalfitan merchants rescued Siconulf from prison, and he was proclaimed prince in Salerno. A civil war erupted in the Italian Mezzogiorno. In 847, Emperor Lothair I had Guy I of Spoleto and Sergius I of Naples mediate a division of the great Lombard principality. In 851, Louis, King of Italy, divided the principality into two sections: one with its capital at Salerno and another with the original Benevento.

Salerno consisted of Taranto, Cassano, Cosenza, Paestum, Conza, Potenza, Sarno, Cimitile (Nola), Capua, Teano, and Sora. It was a maritime power with numerous seaports, including Salerno itself, and controlled mostly the western half of the old duchy.

The principality did not enjoy stability in its early years. In 851, Siconulf died and his son Sico was still a child. He was deposed and replaced by his regent, Peter, in 853, and Peter was succeeded that year by his son Adhemar. Adhemar's stormy princeship ended violently: a revolt deposed him, and Guaifer, the scion of a local family of note, the Dauferidi, had him blinded and imprisoned. Guaifer succeeded him in the princely office with the support of the people.

=== Dauferidi ===
Guaifer stabilised the principality during his long reign of nineteen years. His successors reigned for similarly lengthy periods, and in a short time Salerno surpassed Benevento in greatness. During his reign, Capua made itself independent. Salerno was still technically a vassal of the Western emperor, but it was practically independent. The prince even allied himself with the Saracens. In 880, Guaifer was removed in a precedent-setting act by his son: Guaimar I forced him into a monastery and took up the reins of government. The chronicles of his reign describe him in despotic terms, and he does not seem to have been popular. He did reverse the alliance with the Saracens in favour of closer ties to the emperor, then Charles the Bald. In 887, however, he broke with the West and paid homage to the Byzantine Emperor, receiving the title of patricius. In 900 or 901, his son, Guaimar II, forced him into his own monastic foundation of San Massimo and began his reign.

Guaimar II raised Salerno to greatness. He was a more religious prince than his father, who had been pious by the standards of the time. He introduced the Cluniac reforms to Salerno. He was also more inclined to war with the Muslims and took part in the famous Battle of the Garigliano in 915. In this he was the ally of the Byzantines, as he was throughout his reign, with the exception of a brief period in the 920s. He increased his prestige and influence through marriage alliances with the Beneventans and Capuans, and even entered into successful schemes against the Byzantine Campania, where he gained much ground. Guaimar further worked to stabilise his dynasty by altering the pattern of succession. He appointed his son Gisulf I as co-prince in 943, and Gisulf succeeded in 946.

The succession was not uncontested from without. The allied forces of John III of Naples and Landulf II of Benevento invaded, but an alliance with the Amalfitans saved Gisulf's reign. Gisulf like his father remained with the Greeks, even warring with the pope. He concluded a treaty with the latter and came to the defence of Pandulf Ironhead, the prince of Benevento and Capua. Though his neighbours constantly seemed to be opposing him, the Ironhead reinstalled him after an insurrection of 974, which had been supported by his brother and the neighbouring Greek cities. Gisulf did not have any children at his death, and Salerno passed into the wider realm of the Ironhead, who bestowed it on his son Pandulf II.

=== Foreign rule ===
From 978, the year of Prince Gisulf's death, to 983, when the Salernitans reinstated a dynasty of their choosing, the principality was under the rule of "foreigners": either of the Capuan princely house or the dukes of Amalfi. The Amalfitans took advantage of the Ironhead's death in 981 to seize it from Pandulf II, and Manso I of Amalfi was made prince. He was unpopular, and a Spoletan, John, son of Lambert, was elected after the expulsion of the Amalfitans. Discordant relations prevailed with Amalfi until the end of the principality a century later.

=== Zenith and decline ===
John established his own dynasty, which was to usher in Salerno's final period of greatness as an independent Lombard entity. He tried to increase control of the church in his region, but failed. He followed the principle of co-regency of sons, to stabilise the succession. His son, Guaimar III, had to deal with Saracen attacks, but was aided by the Norman mercenaries he had helped to recruit to the south. He moved away from Byzantium throughout his reign and supported the Lombard rebels of Melus of Bari. He also supported his neighbour, Pandulf IV of Capua, despite the latter's unpopularity. Under Guaimar III, the Schola Medica Salernitana first began to flourish, and he was capable of striking Opulenta Salernitanum on his coins as a sign of the trading wealth of his city.

Guaimar IV enlarged his Principate of Salerno -between 1038 and 1047- to include all continental southern Italy

Guaimar IV brought Salerno to its greatest heights, but it did not survive him. He, too, used the Normans for mutual gain. He can be considered chiefly responsible for the rise of the Hautevilles in the Mezzogiorno. He opposed Pandulf of Capua, unlike his father, and he united his principality with that one for the first time since Pandulf Ironhead.

In 1038, he sought the arbitration of both emperors over matters concerning Pandulf, but only the Holy Roman Emperor, Conrad II, responded, and Salerno became fully Western in allegiance. Conrad made Guaimar a powerful prince, and he extended his authority militarily over the coastal city-states of Gaeta, Naples, and Amalfi. He opened up the Campania, Apulia, and Calabria to conquest and between 1038 and 1047 he was in control of all the continental southern Italy. But his successes were reversed by Conrad's son, Henry III, who in 1047 removed Guaimar from Capua and restructured the nature of his suzerain-vassal relationships to limit his power.

In 1052, Guaimar was assassinated, and his son and successor, Gisulf II, showed none of his political acumen.

Under Gisulf, Salerno declined. He made useless war on Amalfi and on his Norman neighbours, finally on Robert Guiscard, the duke of Apulia, himself. Though Salerno remained wealthy and opulent to the end of his reign, he misused this wealth during the siege of 1077 and lost his city and his principality to the Guiscard.

With Gisulf's defeat, Salerno ceased to be the capital of a large principality, and its once vast domain was completely merged into the Duchy of Apulia and Calabria, the peninsular possession of the Hauteville family.

Salerno did continue as the most important city of southern Italy until the end of Hauteville rule in 1194, before being punished for its former rebellion against the Hohenstaufen dynasty in 1191, during which its populace handed over the entrusted Empress Constance to Tancred, King of Sicily, leading to her effective captivity until May 1192. As a consequence, Emperor Henry VI destroyed Salerno and, since then, the city never recovered its former importance, being overtaken in southern mainland Italy by Naples.

The Schola Medica Salernitana of Guaimar III survived until Napoleonic times, and it is considered the world's first university of medicine.

== Aftermath ==
Following the foundation of the Kingdom of Sicily in 1139 by Roger II of Sicily, the Principality of Salerno was reconstituted as a fief subject to the crown and was governed, among others, by exponents of great Italian aristocratic families such as the Colonnas, the Orsinis and in particular the Sanseverinos. Ferrante Sanseverino was the last of the actual Princes of Salerno and hosted Renaissance personalities in Salerno such as Bernardo Tasso, the father of Torquato Tasso.

== Sources ==
- Chalandon, Ferdinand. Histoire de la domination normande en Italie et en Sicilie. Paris, 1907.
- D'Ambrosio, A. Storia di Napoli dalle origini ad oggi. Ed. Nuova E.V. Napoli 2002
- Dizionario Biografico degli Italiani. Rome, 1960–Present.
- Gwatkin, H.M., Whitney, J.P. (ed) et al. The Cambridge Medieval History: Volume III. Cambridge University Press, 1926.
- Iannizzaro, Vincenzo. Salerno. La Cinta Muraria dai Romani agli Spagnoli. Editore Elea Press. Salerno, 1999.
- Norwich, John Julius. The Normans in the South 1016-1130. Longmans: London, 1967.
- Oman, Charles. The Dark Ages 476-918. Rivingtons: London, 1914.
