= Jus naufragii =

Medieval custom of disposition of shipwreck

The jus naufragii (right of shipwreck), sometimes lex naufragii (law of shipwreck), was a medieval custom (never actually a law) which allowed the inhabitants or lord of a territory to seize all that washed ashore from the wreck of a ship along its coast. This applied, originally, to all the cargo of the ship, the wreckage itself, and even any passengers who came ashore, who were thus converted into slaves. This latter custom disappeared before the jus naufragii came to the attention of lawmakers.

== Right, God, and abolition ==
The theoretical basis for the law, in Christian countries, was that God must be punishing the doomed ship for the vice of the crew. The ship and its cargo had thus been taken from their rightful owners by an act of God and were fair game. Despite this, consistent attempts to abolish the practice are recorded over the course of more than a millennium.

Roman and Byzantine law made no room for the custom. The Codex and the Digesta of Justinian I include sections respectively titled De naufragiis and De incendio, ruina, naufragio rate, nave expugnata. They refer to a law of the emperor Antoninus Pius outlawing exercise of the jus naufragii. Around 500 the Breviarium Alaricianum of the Visigoths, probably following Roman law, forbade the custom. Theodoric the Great also legislated against it, but apparently to no long-term avail.

Despite the appeal to Providence for its justification, canon law anathematised those who exercised the jus. The Lateran Council of 1179 and the Council of Nantes (1127) both outlawed it. In 1124 Pope Clement II issued a bull condemning it and on 24 February 1509 Julius II issued a bull prohibiting the collection of bona naufragantia.

The jus did not completely lack support, however. Charles I of Sicily used it, Philip III of France legislated regulations to cover it, and in the same kingdom Henry II seems to have tolerated it. In his reign, according to De republica by Jean Bodin, the jus was cited by Anne de Montmorency to justify the seizure of a wrecked ship with the support of the king.

== Italy ==
In 827, Sicard of Benevento and Andrew II of Naples signed a treaty, the Pactum Sicardi, whereby the lex naufragii was abolished in the domain of Benevento. The Papacy and the north Italian comuni soon followed the southern example and fought to have the property rights (and right to liberty) of sailors and merchants recognised universally.

When in 1184 a Genoese ship carrying Ibn Jubayr was wrecked off the coast of Messina, it was only by the intervention of William II of Sicily that the passengers were spared robbery and enslavement.

In June 1181 the Genoese ambassador Rodoano de Mauro signed a treaty with Abu Ibrahim Ishaq Ibn Muhammad Ibn Ali of the Balearics that included a protection of the rights of Genoese merchants from the exercise of the jus. This treaty was renewed for twenty years in August 1188 by Niccolò Leccanozze and Ishaq's successor. Meanwhile, on 1 June 1184, Pisa and Lucca had signed a similar treaty with the Balearic Muslims.

In the early thirteenth century, Frederick I outlawed the jus in the Kingdom of Sicily, and by 1270 the custom had gone completely out of fashion in the Mediterranean when Charles I, a Frenchman by upbringing, invoked the jus naufragii in Sicily, against the Eighth Crusaders.

== Northern Europe ==
In northern Europe the custom survived much longer, despite legislation designed to forbid it. In the territory of the Bishop of Utrecht the right was exercised on the river until its abrogation in 1163. The de facto independent Viscounty of Léon sustained itself on the proceeds of "the most valuable of precious stones", a rock which generated 100,000 solidi per annum in revenue due to shipwrecks.

In the thirteenth century Edward I in England and Louis IX in France sought to ban the jus. In the fourteenth century the law became the target of several Holy Roman Emperors: Henry VII in 1310, Louis IV in 1336, and Charles IV in 1366. In the fifteenth century the Hanseatic League began funding salvage missions and offering rewards to salvors.

Attempts were also made in France to abolish the practice by means of treaties where legislation could not take effect. France and the Duchy of Brittany signed one in 1231 and France and Venice in 1268. Most French maritime laws also included articles restricting the practice of lex naufragii, such as the Rolls of Oléron of Eleanor of Aquitaine (c. 1160), the Constitutio criminalis of Charles V (the later Carolina of 1532), an ordinance of Francis I of 1543 and Charles IX of 1568.

== Early modern Europe ==
Several early modern treaties established a time frame during which the owner of the goods wrecked could claim them, typically a year and a day. England and the Netherlands signed a treaty of alliance 17 September 1625 at Southampton that included a clause allowing the owners of wreckage to reclaim it within a year, and France and the Netherlands signed 27 April 1662 demanding the restitution of shipwrecked goods on the payment of a droit de sauvement, a salvor's fee. A commercial treaty signed at Nijmegen on 10 August 1678 had an article to the same effect.

On 12 December 1663 the Netherlands abolished what remained of the old jus—the recht van de tiend penning, or right of the tenth penny. The French Ordonnance de la Marine (1681) abolished the jus entirely and put castaways under royal protection. The Turkish capitulations of 1535 and 1740 contain clauses banning the jus naufragii.
