= Guaifer of Salerno =

9th-century Italian prince

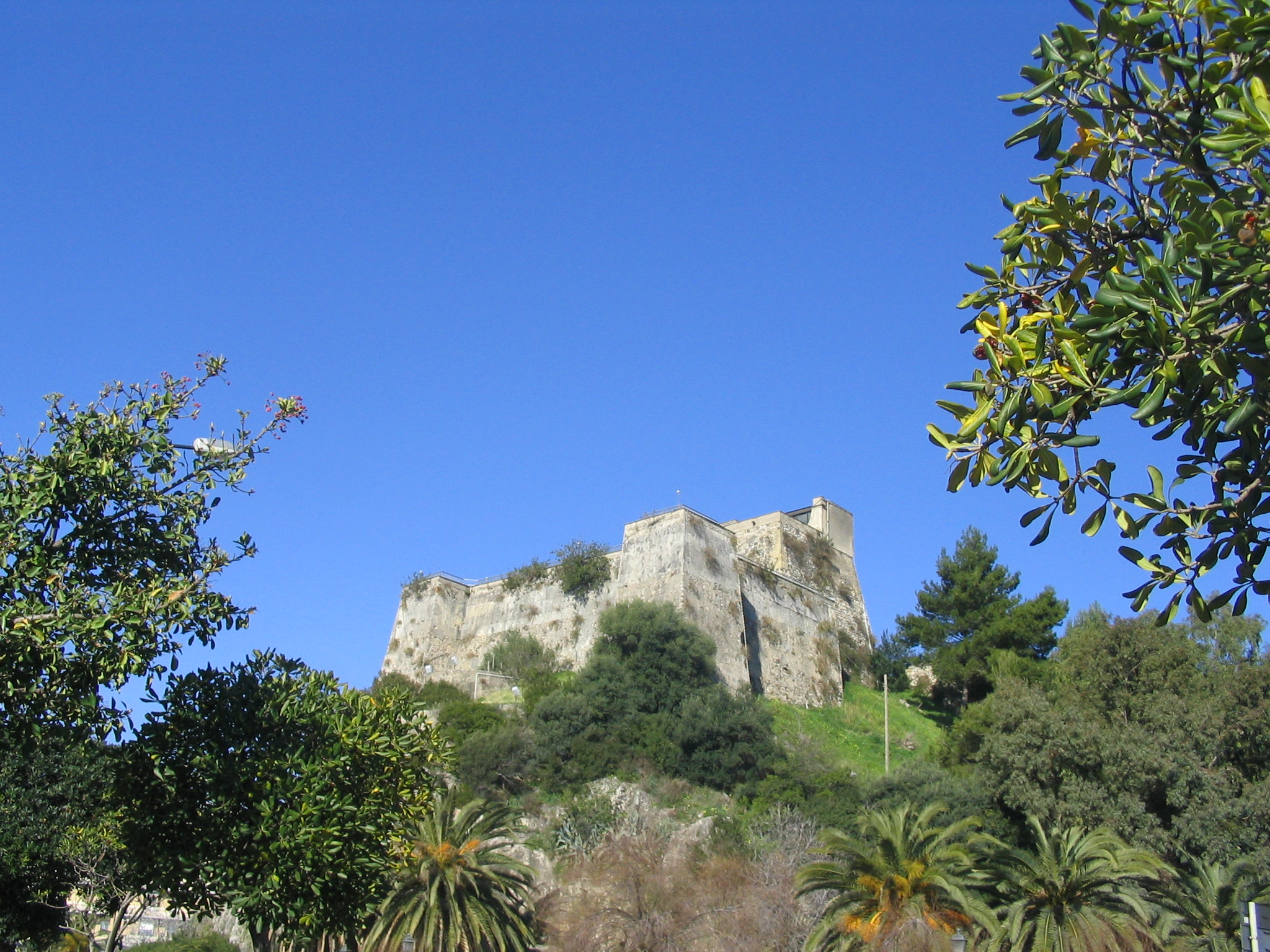

Guaifer (also Guaifar, Waifer, Waifar, or Guaiferio) (c. 835 – 880) was the Prince of Salerno from 861. The son of Daufer the Mute and grandson of Daufer the Prophet, he was the first of the Dauferidi to sit on the Salernitan throne which his family dominated unobstructed until 977.

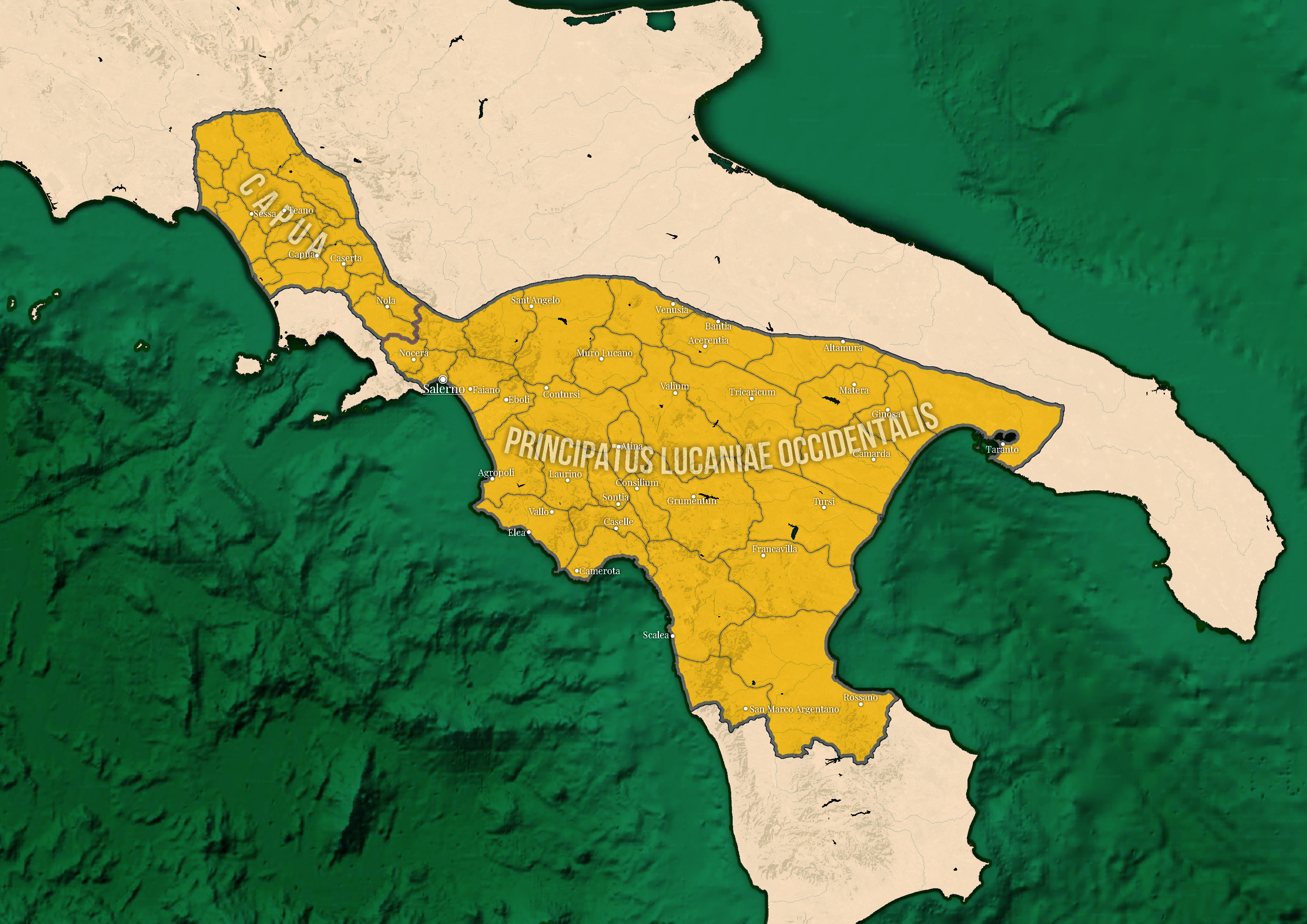
Map of the Principality of Salerno in 871 under the rule of Guaifer

Guaifer's sister, Adelchisa, had married Sicard of Benevento and when Sicard was assassinated and Radelchis usurped the throne, Guaifer helped release Siconulf, the dead prince's brother, and supported him in his war with Radelchis for the throne, even proclaiming him prince in Salerno. In 851, the great principality of Benevento was officially divided between Benevento and Salerno by the Emperor Louis II. Siconulf's son and successor fell under the control of Peter, who, in December 853, received Louis's recognition as prince. He was succeeded by his son Adhemar, but the latter's rule was unpopular and by 859, Capua, a Salernitan vassal desiring independence, was wearing away at princely authority with its attacks. In 861, matters came to a head and Guaifer leading a popular revolt, removed Adhemar and imprisoned him, blinding him later. To solidify his own position he exiled his own nephew, another Daufer. This was all seen as rebellion by the Emperor Louis, but he was occupied elsewhere.

At the beginning of his reign, a restive Capua, which had gone through several internal upheavals, under the gastald or count Landulf II made a move for independence, but Guaifer kept them securely in the Salernitan fold. Nonetheless, Guaifer married Landelaica, daughter of Lando I of Capua, by whom he had a son, Guaimar, who succeeded him. In 865, Guaifer founded the monastery of San Massimo, where he and his descendants are buried, and in 868, he richly endowed it with grants in land and money. Despite his status as a Christian prince, he was not usually at war with the Moslems and may even have been their foedus for a time (according to Erchempert). They besieged his city in 871–872, but to no avail. He retired to or was forced by his son into the monastery of Monte Cassino in 880, but died very soon after.

== Sources ==
- Caravale, Mario (ed). Dizionario Biografico degli Italiani: LX Grosso – Guglielmo da Forlì. Rome, 2003.

Regnal titles
Preceded by Adhemar	Prince of Salerno; 861–880	Succeeded by Guaimar I
