= Principality of Benevento =

Independent Lombard state in present-day southern Italy from 774 to 1053

Principality of Benevento Principatus Beneventi (Latin)
- 774–1081
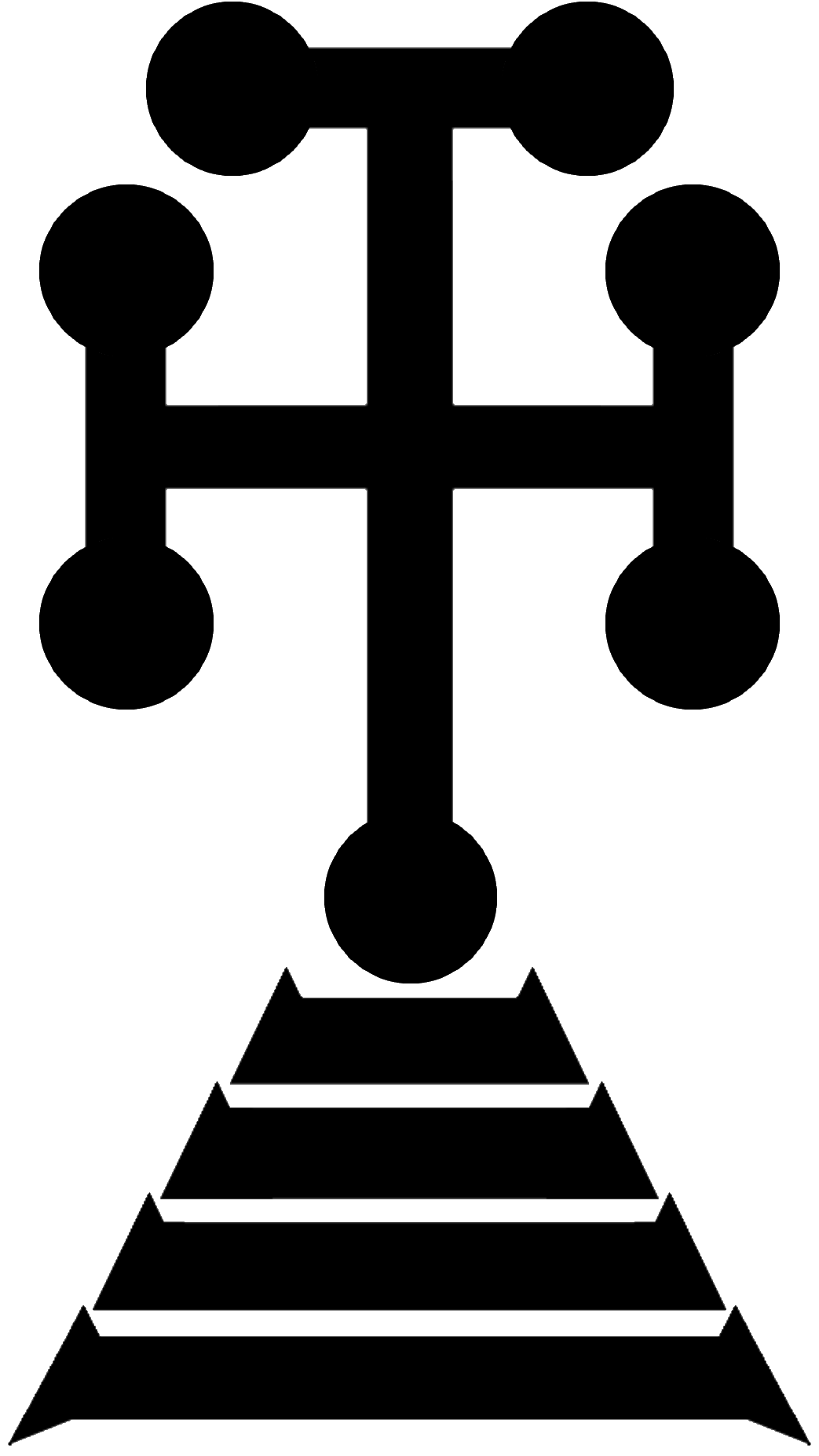
- Calvary cross potent motif was commonly minted on coins by various princes

- The Principality of Benevento shown within Italy in 1000
- Status: Sovereign state (774–787); Under Frankish suzerainty (787-1053); Under Papal suzerainty (1053-1081)
- Capital: Benevento
- Common languages: Vulgar Latin; Lombardic (Vestigial)
- Religion: Chalcedonian Christianity (official)
- Government: Monarchy
- Prince
  - 774–787: Arechis II (last duke & first prince)
  - 1054–1077: Landulf VI
  - 1078–1081: Robert Guiscard (last prince)
- History
  - Established: 774
  - Frankish Siege of Salerno: 787
  - Norman Invasion: 1053
  - Disestablished: 1081
- Currency: Solidus, tremissis, denarius
Preceded by
Duchy of Benevento
Succeeded by
Papal States
Principality of Salerno
County of Apulia and Calabria
- Today part of: Italy

The Principality of Benevento was the sole Lombard territory (former Duchy of Benevento) which continued to exist as a rump state, maintaining its de facto independence after the fall of the Kingdom of the Lombards at the hands of the Franks. Benevento dwindled in size in the early 11th century, and was completely captured by the Norman Robert Guiscard in 1053.

== Fall of the Lombards ==
A map of Europe in 814 at the death of Charlemagne

Benevento at its maximum extent circa 851

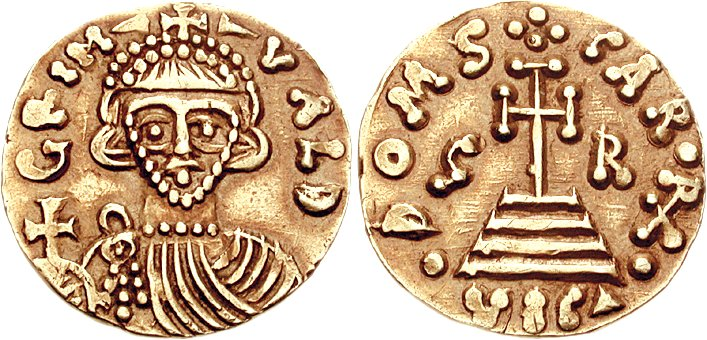
Solidus of Grimoald III

In 758, king Desiderius briefly captured Spoleto and Benevento, but with Charlemagne's conquest of the Lombard kingdom in 774, Arechis II tried to claim the royal dignity and make Benevento a secundum Ticinum: a second Pavia (the old Lombard capital). Seeing that this was impractical and would draw Frankish attention to himself, he opted instead for the title of princeps (prince). In 787, he was forced by Charlemagne's siege of Salerno to submit to Frankish suzerainty. At this time, Benevento was acclaimed by a chronicler as a Ticinum geminum—a "twin Pavia". Arechis expanded the Roman city, with new walled enclosures extending onto the level ground southwest of the old city, where Arechis razed old constructions for a new princely palace, whose open court is still traceable in the Piano di Corte of the acropolis. Like their Byzantine enemies, the dukes linked the palace compound with a national church, Saint Sophia.

In 788, the principality was invaded by Byzantine troops led by Desiderius's son, Adelchis, who had taken refuge at Constantinople. However, his attempts were thwarted by Arechis' son, Grimoald III, who had, however, partially submitted to the Franks. The Franks assisted in the repulsion of Adelchis, but, in turn, attacked Benevento's territories several times, obtaining small gains, notably the annexation of Chieti to the duchy of Spoleto. In 814, Grimoald IV made vague promises of tribute and submission to Louis the Pious, which were renewed by his successor Sico. None of these pledges were followed up, and the decreased power and influence of the individual Carolingian monarchs allowed the duchy to increase its autonomy.

The Beneventan dukes employed seal rings to confirm documents, just like the Lombard kings, and the princes may have continued to use them into the ninth century. They indicate a continuation (or imitation) of Roman forms of administration, as well as widespread literacy (or "sub-literacy").

== Decline through division and conquest ==
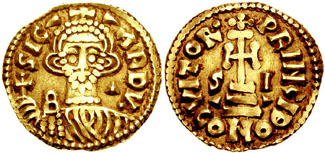
Solidus of Sicard

In the following century despite the continuing hostility of the Frankish sovereigns, Benevento reached its apex, imposing a tribute on Naples and capturing Amalfi under Duke Sicard. When Sicard was assassinated in 839, a civil war broke out. Sicard's brother, Siconulf, was proclaimed prince in Salerno while the assassin Radelchis took the throne in Benevento. After 10 years of civil war, Emperor Louis II ended the conflict by decreeing that the duchy be split into two distinct principates: Benevento (with Molise and Apulia north to Taranto) and the Principality of Salerno. As a part of the partition, Capua was made part of the Principality of Salerno.

The crisis was aggravated by the beginning of Muslim ravages, the first Saracens having been called in by Radelchis and subsequently Siconulf in their decade-long war. Often spurred by rival Christian rulers, the Saracens attacked Naples and Salerno unsuccessfully. The Islamic colony in southern Lazio was eliminated only in 915, after the Battle of Garigliano. At the same time, however, the Byzantine Empire reconquered a great part of southern Italy, beginning at Bari, which they retook from the Saracens in 876, and eventually elevating their themes under strategoi into a Catapanate of Italy (999), further reducing the already declining Beneventan power.

In 899, Atenulf I of Capua conquered Benevento and united the two duchies. He declared them inseparable and introduced the principle of co-rule, whereby sons would be associated with their fathers, a principle soon borrowed by Salerno. However, all Langobardia minor was unified for the last time by Duke Pandulf Ironhead, who became prince of Salerno in 978. He succeeded in making Benevento an archdiocese in 969. Before his death (March 981), he had gained from Emperor Otto I the title of Duke of Spoleto also. However, he split it between his sons: Landulf IV received Benevento-Capua and Pandulf II, Salerno. Soon, Benevento was stripped away again when Pandulf, the Ironhead's nephew, rebelled, demanding his part of the inheritance.

The first decades of the eleventh century saw Benevento dwindle to less than either of her sister duchies, Salerno, then prominent, or Capua. Around 1000, Benevento still comprised 34 separate counties. In 1022, Henry II, Holy Roman Emperor conquered both Capua and Benevento, but returned to Germany after the failed siege of Troia. The Prince of Salerno Guaimar IV took control of Benevento in 1040.

Successively The Normans arrived in the Mezzogiorno in these years, and Benevento then acknowledged to be in papal suzerainty, was only an off-and-on ally. The Beneventan duke still had enough prestige to lend his son, Atenulf, to the Norman-Lombard rebellion in Apulia as leader, but Atenulf abandoned the Normans and Benevento lost what was left of its influence.

The greatest of the Norman rulers of the south was Robert Guiscard, who captured Benevento in 1053. Guiscard, in turn, gave Benevento to his nominal suzerain, Pope Leo IX. Pope Leo IX and his successors appointed a series of minor Lombards as dukes until Pope Gregory VII appointed Guiscard Prince of Benevento in 1078. Finally, in 1081, Guiscard returned the title to the papacy with little but the city remaining of the once-great principality which had determined the direction of South Italian affairs for generations. No dukes or princes were thereafter named.

The territory of Benevento continued for a long time, albeit reduced in territory, to exist as an autonomous administrative entity within the Papal States. Although reduced to just 130 square kilometers, it constituted a province under a papal governor, and the territory continued at times to be defined as the Principality of Benevento (for example, Alfonso Carafa, nephew of Pope Paul IV, was appointed in 1558 "perpetual governor of the Principality of Benevento"). Only during the Napoleonic period, once occupied by the French, was it actually assigned to a ruler who used the title of Prince of Benevento, the minister Talleyrand (he reigned as Sovereign Prince of the new Principality of Benevento between 1806 and 1814-1815, Talleyrand never resided in the principality, but appointed governors to rule the territory in his place).

== General References ==
- Cooper, Duff, Talleyrand (Frankfurt: 1982, ISBN 3-458-32097-0).
- Gwatkin, H. M. (1926). J. P. Whitney; et al. (eds.). The Cambridge Medieval History: Volume III. Cambridge University Press.
- Norwich, John Julius (1970). The Normans in Sicily. Penguin Books.
- Oman, Charles (1914). The Dark Ages 476-918. London: Rivingtons.
