= 817 =

Calendar year

817 in various calendars
- Gregorian calendar: 817; DCCCXVII
- Ab urbe condita: 1570
- Armenian calendar: 266; ԹՎ ՄԿԶ
- Assyrian calendar: 5567
- Balinese saka calendar: 738–739
- Bengali calendar: 223–224
- Berber calendar: 1767
- Buddhist calendar: 1361
- Burmese calendar: 179
- Byzantine calendar: 6325–6326
- Chinese calendar: 丙申年 (Fire Monkey); 3514 or 3307 — to — 丁酉年 (Fire Rooster); 3515 or 3308
- Coptic calendar: 533–534
- Discordian calendar: 1983
- Ethiopian calendar: 809–810
- Hebrew calendar: 4577–4578
- Hindu calendars
- Vikram Samvat: 873–874
- Shaka Samvat: 738–739
- Kali Yuga: 3917–3918
- Holocene calendar: 10817
- Iranian calendar: 195–196
- Islamic calendar: 201–202
- Japanese calendar: Kōnin 8 (弘仁８年)
- Javanese calendar: 713–714
- Julian calendar: 817; DCCCXVII
- Korean calendar: 3150
- Minguo calendar: 1095 before ROC 民前1095年
- Nanakshahi calendar: −651
- Seleucid era: 1128/1129 AG
- Thai solar calendar: 1359–1360
- Tibetan calendar: མེ་ཕོ་སྤྲེ་ལོ་ (male Fire-Monkey); 943 or 562 or −210 — to — མེ་མོ་བྱ་ལོ་ (female Fire-Bird); 944 or 563 or −209

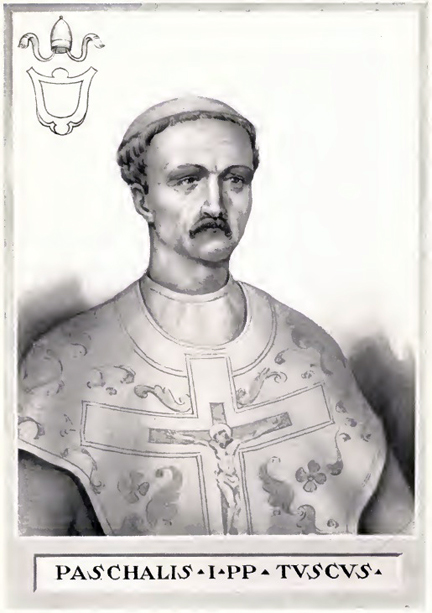
Pope Paschal I (817–824)

Year 817 (DCCCXVII) was a common year starting on Thursday of the Julian calendar.

== Events ==
=== By place ===
==== Europe ====
- Summer – Emperor Louis I issues an Ordinatio Imperii, an imperial decree that lays out plans for an orderly succession. He divides the Frankish Empire among his three sons: Lothair, the eldest, is proclaimed co-emperor in Aachen, and becomes the overlord of his brothers. He receives the dominion of Burgundy (including German and Gallic parts). Pepin, the second son, is proclaimed king of Aquitaine, and receives Gascony (including the marche around Toulouse and parts of Septimania); Louis (the youngest son) is proclaimed king of Bavaria, and receives the dominions of East Francia.
- Prince Grimoald IV is assassinated by a complot of Lombard nobles vying for his throne. He is succeeded by Sico as ruler of Benevento (Southern Italy), who is forced to pay an annual tribute of 7,000 solidi to Louis I.

==== North Africa ====
- Ziyadat Allah I becomes the third Aghlabid emir of Ifriqiya (modern Tunisia). During his rule, the relationship between the Aghlabid Dynasty and the Arab troops remains strained.

=== By topic ===
==== Religion ====
- January 24 – Pope Stephen IV dies at Rome after a 7-month reign, and is succeeded by Paschal I as the 98th pope of the Catholic Church.
- Synod of Aachen: The council adopts a capitulare monasticum, containing the Benedictine rules of monastic life in the Frankish realm.

== Births ==
- Abu Dawud, Muslim hadith compiler (or 818)
- Al-Fath ibn Khaqan, Muslim governor (or 818)
- Pepin, count of Vermandois (approximate date)
- Pyinbya, king of Burma (d. 876)

== Deaths ==
- January 24 – Stephen IV, pope of the Catholic Church
- Grimoald IV, Lombard prince of Benevento
- Quriaqos of Tagrit, patriarch of Antioch
- Tibraide mac Cethernach, abbot of Clonfert
- Theophanes the Confessor, Byzantine monk (or 818)
- Wu Yuanji, general of the Tang Dynasty
