= Pandenulf of Capua =

9th century Italian noble

- Count of Capua
- Tenure: 862–881
- Predecessor: Pando of Capua
- Successor: Athanasius of Naples
- Father: Pando of Capua

Pandenulf (also spelled Pandonolf or Pandenolf) was the Count of Capua, claiming that title from 862 and holding it successfully during the tumultuous civil war of 879 – 882. He was the son and successor of Pando, but was removed on his father's death by his uncle the bishop, Landulf II.

On Landulf's death, he reasserted his claim with the support of a large faction, though he was opposed by Lando III. He took the cities of Teano and Caserta, while Lando's faction held Caiazzo and Calino. Landenulf had the support of Guaifer of Salerno, so Pandenulf tried to get Gaideris of Benevento and the strategos Gregory, then together in Benevento. They went to Nola, but Pandenulf refused to do homage to Gaideris. The Beneventans and Greeks joined the Salernitans in besieging Capua. The siege dragged on and soon only the prince of Benevento was left.

Meanwhile, Pandenulf renewed his fidelity to the papacy, hoping to use Pope John VIII as leverage against his adversaries. The Capuans, however, had made Landulf, the young son of Lando, bishop in that city, but Pandenulf had him expelled and tried to appoint his own brother Landenulf, though married, bishop. This caused a schism in the Capuan church. Pandenulf sent his brother to Rome demanding that the pope consecrate him. The bishop of Teano and the abbot of Montecassino urged John to resist the Capuan count, but John, wishing to retain his loyalty and to satisfy both claimants, consecrated Landulf as bishop of Old Capua, now called Santa Maria Capua Vetere, and affirmed Landenulf as bishop of New Capua. Eventually, Pandenulf recognised Lando in Caiazzo, but there were other claimants to deal with.

After Docibilis I of Gaeta broke with the pope over the Saracens, with whom Docibilis was allied, John authorised Pandenulf to seize papal possessions governed by Naples. Pandenulf's troops reduced the Gaetans to control only of their own peninsula, but Docibils called in the Saracens of Agropoli and retook Fondi, ravaging the papal territory. Pandenulf was called back by events in Capua, however, and John was forced to make a treaty with Docibilis whereby the latter became a papal vassal.

Pandenulf found a second ally in the person of Athanasius, duke-bishop of Naples. Wanting to keep the Capuans at war, Athanasius gladly entered the conflict. He was excommunicated at the time because he was allied with the Saracens. He thus transferred his allegiance to the Byzantines and besieged Capua. From April 881, he expelled Pandenulf and himself ruled in Capua as a vassal of Guaimar I of Salerno.

== Sources ==
- Gay, Jules. L'Italie méridionale et l'empire Byzantin: Livre I. Burt Franklin: New York, 1904.
- Historia Langabardorvm Beneventarnorvm at The Latin Library
- Caravale, Mario (ed). Dizionario Biografico degli Italiani: LXIII Labroca – Laterza. Rome, 2004.

Preceded by Pando	Count of Capua; 862 – 863	Succeeded by Landulf II
Preceded by Landulf II	Count of Capua; 879 – 882	Succeeded by Lando III
