= Library of Latin Texts =

Database of Latin texts

The Library of Latin Texts (LLT) is a subscription-based database of Latin texts, from antiquity up to the present day. Started in 1991 as the CETEDOC Library of Christian Latin Texts (CLCLT), it continues to be developed by the Centre ‘Traditio Litterarum Occidentalium’ and is hosted by Brepols Publishers.

== History ==
In 1968, Professor Paul Tombeur established and became the director of the Centre for the Electronic Processing of Documents (CETEDOC) at the Catholic University of Leuven (now UCLouvain), with its stated purpose being the use of computer technology to assist in the study of documents. As part of its work, it made Latin documents available on microfiche, CD-ROM, and DVD.

In 1991, CETEDOC began development of the CETEDOC Library of Christian Latin Texts (CLCLT), with the aim of encompassing the entirety of Christian Latin literature. This digital database was initially released as a CD-ROM. Since 2001, the activities of CETEDOC have been continued in Turnhout, Belgium by the Centre ‘Traditio Litterarum Occidentalium’ (CTLO), still led by Tombeur.

In 2002, it was decided to expand the database's chronological scope beyond medieval and patristic times, so its name was changed to Library of Latin Texts. In 2009, a B series (LLT-B) was added to the original LLT (hence known as LLT-A). The LLT-B's scope was to accelerate the growth of the database by directly adopting the text of existing editions, without the intensive research work that is applied to the texts of the LLT-A. This work includes verifying facts related to the text and correcting errors in the printed edition.

== Difference between the LLT and similar databases ==
Unlike similar initiatives, like Corpus Corporum and The Latin Library, the LLT is not an open-access database. This allows for the adoption of copyrighted editions. In fact, while open-access initiatives have to rely on out-of-copyright, possibly outdated editions, the LLT's policy is to select texts that have "been edited according to best contemporary scholarly practice". The texts edited in Brepols' Corpus Christianorum series form the core of the LLT, even though numerically, they are outnumbered by texts edited in other publishers' series and, if no modern edition is available, by out-of-copyright editions. Nevertheless, for scholarly purposes, the LLT should be used in conjunction with the printed editions, as the critical apparatus is not included in the database.

== See also ==
- Corpus Corporum
- The Latin Library
- Database of Latin Dictionaries
