= Pando of Capua =

9th century Italian noble

- Count of Capua
- Tenure: 861 – 862
- Predecessor: Lando II of Capua
- Successor: Pandenulf
- Died: 862 or 863
- Father: Landulf I of Capua

Pando the Rapacious (Italian: Pandone il Rapace; died 862 or 863) was the second son of Landulf I of Capua and brother of Lando I. When his father died (843), Lando succeeded to the countship, but Pando and their younger brother Landulf were associated as co-rulers (with no real power). In fact, he went to Salerno, where he became a marepaphias (or marepahissatum/marepahis, a Byzantine function).

On Lando's death, his son, Lando II succeeded him, but Pando deposed him in 861 and sent him to govern Caiazzo. In that same year, Pando took the countship of Capua for himself and declared Capua free and independent from Salerno. He did not reign for long, however, and his reign was spent mostly in war for his usurped throne; wars in which he was "rapacious". He destroyed the city of Caserta (c.863) and captured his nephew Landenulf (Lando II's brother) and forty other primarii (leading men) of the city. He then built a large, defensive tower around which modern Caserta was built. That tower is now included in the Palazzo della Prefettura, once seat of the counts of Caserta and, later, a royal residence.

Pando died in battle and was succeeded by his son Pandenulf, who was deposed, while his younger son Landenulf became bishop of Capua in 879. Pandenulf later became the first of a line of counts of Caserta.

Preceded by Lando II	Count of Capua; 861 – 862	Succeeded by Pandenulf
