= Pactum Sicardi =

836 treaty between Naples and Benevento

Contemporary effigy of Prince Sicard, namesake of the Pactum, from one of his coins

The Pactum Sicardi was a treaty signed on 4 July 836 between the Greek Duchy of Naples, including its satellite city-states of Sorrento and Amalfi, represented by Bishop John IV and Duke Andrew II, and the Lombard Prince of Benevento, Sicard. The treaty was an armistice ending a war between the Greek states and Benevento, during which the Byzantine Empire had not intervened on behalf of its subjects. It was supposed to last five years between the Lombard prince and the Neapolitans. It was a temporary armistice and was distinguished from other treaties such as Pactum Warmundi, which established temporary alliances.

The political situation in the Campania region during the ninth- and tenth-century was described as unstable and typified by constant tensions between and within the neighbouring polities. The Pactum Sicardi assumed the form of a multi-clause treaty that probably aimed to address all possible causes of conflict between the two signatories.

By the treaty, Prince Sicard recognised the rights of merchants from the three cities to travel through his domains. He made navigation up the rivers Patria, Volturno, and Minturno open to merchants, responsales (envoys), and milities (soldiers). Sicard did not give up his powers of enforcement over either the illegal slave trade (in Lombards) or the trafficking of stolen merchandise. He did abolish the lex naufragii (law of shipwreck) by which the landowner on whose shores a wrecked ship or its cargo washed up was the possessor of that wealth: "If a ship is wrecked because of the fault [of the men aboard] the goods found in it are to be returned to the one to whome they belonged and still belong." This measure, protecting the property rights of shipping companies and merchants, was "far in advance of these times".

Despite these efforts, a war began again in 837, when Duke Andrew of Naples called in Saracens as allies against Benevento. In 838 Sicard captured Amalfi by sea. The Pactum Sicardi has indicated the interest of the parties on this territory, particularly with the fragmentary reference of the treaty, which detailed an interest on both sides to control the activities of the Amalfitans.

== Sources ==
- Gwatkin, H. M., Whitney, J. P. (ed) et al. (1926). The Cambridge Medieval History: Volume III. Cambridge: Cambridge University Press.
- Lopez, Robert S. and Raymond, Irving W. (1951). Medieval Trade in the Mediterranean World. New York: Columbia University Press. LCCN 54-11542.
