= Contardus of Naples =

Contard (also Contardus or Contardo), a Frank, was briefly the Duke of Naples in 840.

He was sent by Lothair I, King of Italy, in 839 to aid Duke Andrew II against the warring Lombards of the Principality of Benevento. Fearful of Contard's power and Frankish influence, Andrew promised him his daughter Eupraxia in marriage. Andrew, however, put off the marriage until, in March 840, Contardus rose against him and had him killed, usurping his place. Within three days, the Neapolitans had expelled Contard.

== Sources ==
- Ghisalberti, Alberto M. Dizionario Biografico degli Italiani: III Ammirato – Arcoleo. Rome, 1991.

Preceded by Andrew II	Duke of Naples; 840	Succeeded by Sergius I
