= Grimoald IV of Benevento =

Italian noble

Sketch of a denarius of Grimoald

Grimoald IV (assassinated 817), son of Ermenrih, called Falco, was the Lombard Prince of Benevento from 806 until his death. He was a thesaurarius or stolesayz/stoleseyz before becoming prince on the death of Grimoald III, over Grimoald's own son, Ilderic, another stoleseyz.

In 812, he was forced to pay 25,000 solidi in tribute to Charlemagne. In 814, he pledged an annual tribute of 7,000 solidi to Louis the Pious. These promises, however, were never kept and his successor, Sico, made the same empty guarantees. The Beneventans were independent in practice and by the end of the ninth century would not even recognise Frankish overlordship. Grimoald was assassinated in 817 by nobles vying for his throne.

Regnal titles
Preceded by Grimoald III	Prince of Benevento; 806–817	Succeeded by Sico
