= List of princes of Salerno =

The Principality of Salerno in Italy around 1000

This page is a list of the rulers of the Principality of Salerno.

Salerno was a Lombard Principality in southern Italy in the latter centuries of the first millennium.

When Prince Sicard of Benevento was assassinated by Radelchis in 839, the people of Salerno promptly proclaimed his brother, Siconulf, prince. War raged between Radelchis and Siconulf until Emperor Louis II, King of Italy, came down and forced a peace in 851, confirming Siconulf as prince of Salerno. The chronology is very confusing from then on until the assassination of Adhemar, when a new dynasty took the throne.

The Principality of Salerno reached its zenith under Guaimar IV, who ruled all continental southern Italy between 1039 and 1048, expelling for the first time since the fall of the western Roman empire the Byzantines from the Italian peninsula.

Salerno was besieged by the Normans of Robert Guiscard and Prince Richard I of Capua until it fell on 13 December 1076. Prince Gisulf II surrendered the next year and the principality, the final Lombard state in Italy, fell. Salerno became the capital of Guiscard's duchy of Apulia, Calabria, and Sicily.

"Prince of Salerno" was also a title created by Charles I of Naples (reigned 1266-1285) for his son, later Charles II of Naples. It was regularly used for the heirs of the Kings of Naples and later the Two Sicilies. In the fourteenth century, most of the province of Salerno became the territory of the Princes of Sanseverino.

== List ==
The Principality of Salerno as it existed in Guaimar IV's time. Guaimar extended his suzerainty over the Duchy of Amalfi and Principality of Capua and also over all continental Southern Italy, while the Duchy of Naples was a vassal for some years.

- Siconulf (840–851)
- Sico (II) (851–853) (Note: Sico II is so numbered to distinguish him from Prince Sico I of Benevento.)
- Peter (853)
- Adhemar (853–861)
- Guaifer (861–880)
- Guaimar I (880–900)
- Guaimar II (900–946)
- Gisulf I (946–978)

- Landulf of Conza (973), usurper

- Pandulf I (978–981) (Note: Also ruled Benevento and Capua (from 961) and Spoleto (from 967).)
- Pandulf II (981) (Note: He had been named Gisulf I's heir in 973.)
- Manso (981–983) (Note: Also ruled Amalfi (966–1004).) co-ruling with. . .
- John I (981–983) (Note: Also ruled Amalfi (1004–07).)
- John II (983–994/9)
- Guaimar III [or IV] (994/9–1027) (Note: In the 19th century, Michelangelo Schipa, relying on an 11th-century charter mis-dated to 917, inserted a fifth prince named Guaimar into the list, suggesting this "Guaimar III" was a son of Guaimar II. This necessitated re-numbering Guaimar III as "Guaimar IV" and the actual Guaimar IV as "Guaimar V".)
- Guaimar IV [or V] (1027–1052) (Note: Also ruled Amalfi (1039–43), Gaeta (1040–41) and Capua (1038–47) .)

- Pandulf (III) (1052), usurper

- Gisulf II (1052–1077) (Note: Also ruled Amalfi (1088–89).)
