= Corpus Corporum =

Digital Medieval Latin library

Corpus Corporum (Lat. "the collection of collections") or in full, Corpus Corporum: repositorium operum latinorum apud universitatem Turicensem, is a digital Latin library developed by the University of Zurich, Institute for Greek and Latin Philology. As of February 2025, the repository contains a total of approximately 215 million Latin words and 11 million Greek words, including the entire Patrologia Latina, the Vulgate, the Classical Greek and Latin texts from Perseus Digital Library and numerous other medieval and Neo-Latin collections of religious, literary and scientific texts.

== Development ==
The non-commercial site, still under development (in statu nascendi) at mlat.uzh.ch, is conceived as a text (meta-)repository with a set of research tools. It is being developed under the direction of Phillip Roelli, and it uses only free and open software. A completely new version was launched in 2019, programmed by Jan Ctibor (Charles University of Prague).

The project aims to provide a platform for standardised (TEI) xml-files of copyright-free Latin texts; to make the texts searchable in complex manners; and to function, as an online platform for the publication of Latin texts (e.g. the Richard Rufus Project's corpus at Stanford University).

Texts are divided into searchable corpora on specific topics, each corpus usually consists of test data from one project. There are thirty corpora at present (2025).

== See also ==
- Christian Classics Ethereal Library
- Etymologiae
- LacusCurtius
- Library of Latin Texts
- Perseus Project
- Thesaurus Linguae Latinae
