= Lando II of Capua =

Lando II, called Cyruttu, was the count of Capua briefly for six months. He was the eldest son and successor of Lando I, who died in 860.

In May 859, a massive joint expedition of Salerno, Naples, Amalfi, and Suessola marched on Capua. Lando I was in a paralysis at that time and his son Lando II took up arms to defend the city. He defeated the forces sent against them, led by Caesar and Gregory, sons of Sergius I of Naples, at the bridge of Teodemondo over the Volturno. Caesar was captured and led back to Capua in triumph. Erchempert places the battle on 8 May, the day of Michael the Archangel, whose cult was popular among the Lombards. It is therefore significant to Erchempert (a Lombard) that the Lombard Lando should defeat a largely Greek army on such a day.

Lando did succeed his father when he died, but he was expelled shortly thereafter by his uncle Pando. Lando was compensated with Caiazzo, but desired to restore himself to the countship. He married a niece of Athanasius of Naples, but with this ally, he never regained the throne.

== Sources ==
- Erchempert. Historia Langabardorvm Beneventarnorvm at The Latin Library.
- Caravale, Mario (ed). Dizionario Biografico degli Italiani: LXIII Labroca – Laterza. Rome, 2004.

Preceded by Lando I	Count of Capua; 861	Succeeded by Pando
