= Landulf I of Capua =

9th-century Italian count

- Count of Capua
- Tenure: 815 – 843
- Successor: Lando I of Capua
- Born: c. 795
- Died: 843
- Issue: Lando I of Capua; Pando of Capua; Landenulf; Lando II of Capua

Landulf I (c. 795 – 843), called the Old, was the first gastald of Capua of his illustrious family, which would rule Capua until 1058. According to the Cronaca della dinastia di Capua, he ruled in Old Capua for twenty five years and four months and in New Capua for another year and eight months. According to Erchempert, he was "a very bellicose man" (vir bellicosissimus).

In 839, according to the Chronica S. Benedicti Casinensis Landulf took the initiative in freeing Siconulf, the imprisoned brother of the assassinated Prince of Benevento, Sicard. He supported Siconulf in his war with the usurper Radelchis. Siconulf was proclaimed Prince in Salerno and Landulf pledged his city to him. He had fought for Sicard against Naples in his early years, but he concluded a peace treaty with the Neapolitans in order to be able to fully enter the war against Radelchis. Radelchis called in Saracen mercenaries and they sacked Capua in 841. The ruins of that city are all that is left of "Old Capua" (see Santa Maria Capua Vetere). Landulf founded the present-day Capua, "New Capua", at the hill of nearby Triflisco, which he fortified as "Rebelopolis", according to the Chronicon Salernitanum. It is from then that the chronicler says he ruled another year and eight months, dying probably in 843. It seems that, by the end of his life, he was employing the title of Count.

He left four sons of prominence in the next decades in the Mezzogiorno: Lando, who succeeded him, Pando, who became marepaphias at Salerno and later count of Capua, Landenulf, the first Count of Teano and father of three later Counts of Capua, and Landulf, who became both bishop and later Count of Capua.

== Sources ==
- Historia Langabardorvm Beneventarnorvm at The Latin Library
- Chronica S. Benedicti Casinensis at Institut für Mittelalter Forschung
- Caravale, Mario (ed). Dizionario Biografico degli Italiani: LXIII Labroca – Laterza. Rome, 2004.

Preceded by none	Gastald of Capua; 815–843	Succeeded by Lando I
