= Adhemar of Salerno =

Adhemar (or Ademar) (Latin: Ademarius) was the son of Prince Peter of Salerno. He succeeded his father, a usurper, in 853.

Adhemar's rule was unpopular. The counts of Capua whittled away at his princely authority and territory. In 858, he had to call in the assistance of Guy I of Spoleto, who demanded the Liri Valley in return.

In 861, a popular revolt, led by Guaifer of the Dauferidi, overthrew him and imprisoned him. He was tortured and subsequently blinded. Guaifer was elected to replace him.

== Sources ==
Regnal titles
Preceded by Peter	Prince of Salerno; 853–861	Succeeded by Guaifer
