= Sico of Benevento =

9th-century Italian prince

A solidus bearing Sico's effigy on the obverse and the Archangel Michael on the reverse

Sico (c. 758 – 832) was the Lombard Prince of Benevento from 817 to his death.

Before becoming the Prince of Benevento, he had been the gastald of Acerenza. On the assassination of Grimoald IV, Sico succeeded to the princely throne. He made the same empty pledges of tribute and fealty to the Emperor Louis the Pious which Grimoald had made.

Sico tried to extend the principality at the expense of the Byzantines. He besieged Naples at an unknown date (perhaps c. 831), but could failed to take the city. He did however, remove the body of the Neapolitan patron saint, Saint Januarius, who was originally from Benevento. It was also Sico who founded a line of rulers at Capua by bestowing that ancient fortress to Landulf I as gastald. Landulf honoured his benefactor by naming his first castle Sicopolis.

== Children ==
When Sico died he was succeeded by his son Sicard. His daughter Itta (also spelled Ita or Itana) married Guy I, Duke of Spoleto. Sico is sometimes numbered "Sico I" and Sico of Salerno is numbered "Sico II".

Regnal titles
Preceded by Grimoald IV	Prince of Benevento; 817 – 832/4	Succeeded by Sicard
