= Peter of Salerno =

Peter (or Petrus) was an early medieval Italian ruler, who was originally the tutor and guardian of the young prince of Salerno, Sico II. He held that post for two years from 851 to 853.

In that year, he usurped the throne and removed Sico, who fled north. He was confirmed as prince by the Emperor Louis II in December. Peter did not long enjoy his rule. He died later that year, but bequeathed his principality to his son Adhemar.

== Sources ==
Regnal titles
Preceded by Sico	Prince of Salerno; 853	Succeeded by Adhemar
