= Sico of Salerno =

Sico II (died 855) was the second prince of Salerno. Son and successor of Siconulf, he ruled the Principality of Salerno from his father's death in 851 to his own deposition in 853. He is given the ordinal "II" because he was the second Sico to rule in southern Italy, the previous Sico being prince of Benevento.

Sico was a minor when his father died and was put under the tutelage of Peter. Peter deposed him and he fled north to the Emperor Louis II. According to the Chronicon Salernitanum, he eventually came of age in 855 and returned to claim his principality but was poisoned.

Regnal titles
Preceded by Siconulf	Prince of Salerno; 851–853	Succeeded by Peter
