= Andrew II of Naples =

Duke of Naples

Andrew II was the duke of Naples from 834 to 840. During his reign, he was constantly at war with the Lombards and he allowed Gaeta, his vassal, to move towards independence under its own consuls.

In September 834, Andrew overthrew his son-in-law, Duke Leo, who had only been in power for six months. He immediately ceased paying the tribute to Prince Sicard of Benevento. In response, Sicard besieged Naples from May through July in 835, but reached a peace with the duke. In 836, he besieged Naples again despite their pact. Andrew garnered the ignominy of being the first to call in Saracen mercenaries to the Italian peninsula. The consequences of such an action were far-reaching. He signed the Pactum Sicardi with Sicard and the duchies of Amalfi and Sorrento on 4 July.

It was supposed to be a five-year armistice during which merchants of the various coastal Greek cities were free to travel unmolested through the Principality of Benevento. However, the war continued, especially between Andrew and Sicard. In a war of 837, Andrew called in the Saracens again. Between July and August 839, Sicard died and Andrew, ever fearful of warring Lombards, called on the aid of Lothair I, King of Italy, who sent one Contardus to Naples. Fearful of Contardus, Andrew promised him his daughter Eupraxia, the widow of Leo, in marriage. Andrew, however, put off the marriage until, in March 840, Contardus rose against him and had him killed, usurping his place as he had done to Leo.

== Sources ==
- Ghisalberti, Alberto M. Dizionario Biografico degli Italiani: III Ammirato – Arcoleo. Rome, 1961.
- Gwatkin, H.M., Whitney, J.P. (ed) et al. The Cambridge Medieval History: Volume III. Cambridge University Press, 1926.

Preceded by Leo	Duke of Naples; 834–840	Succeeded by Contardus
