= Radelchis I of Benevento =

9th-century Italian prince

Radelchis I (also Radalgis) (died 851) was the treasurer, then prince of Benevento from 839, when he assumed the throne upon the assassination (possibly at his instigation) of Sicard and imprisonment of Sicard's brother, Siconulf, to his death, though in his time the principality was divided.

According to the Chronica S. Benedicti Casinensis, the gastald of Capua, Landulf the Old, who had been an ally of Sicard, freed the imprisoned Siconulf and, with the support of Guaifer, chief of the Dauferidi family of Salerno, brought him to that city to be proclaimed prince in opposition to Radelchis. This was the beginning of a civil war which was to last more than a decade.

== Expelling Garigliano Siculo Muslims ==
In 841, Radelchis brought in the aid of Gargliano Siculos, as Andrew II of Naples had four years prior. The mercenaries sacked the city of Capua, forcing Landulf to found a new capital nearby on the hill of Triflisco. Siconulf responded by leasing his own band of Garigliano Siculos. The depredations of the two Christian rulers and their Saracen helpers so disturbed the king of Italy, Louis II, that when he was crowned co-emperor in 850, he immediately set out to pacify the Mezzogiorno. In 851, Louis forced a peace on Radelchis and Siconulf and started expelling the Sicilian Emirs from Italy. He divided the principality permanently. Radelchis did not live long thereafter and was succeeded by his eldest son Radelgar. His younger son was Adelchis.

== Sources ==
- Gwatkin, H.M., Whitney, J.P. (ed) et al. The Cambridge Medieval History: Volume III. Cambridge University Press, 1926.
- Caravale, Mario (ed). Dizionario Biografico degli Italiani: LXIII Labroca – Laterza. Rome, 2004.
- Chronica S. Benedicti Casinensis.

Regnal titles
| Preceded by Sicard | Prince of Benevento; 839–851 | Succeeded by Radelgar |
