= Latin Library =

Website devoted to public domain Latin texts

The Latin Library is a website that collects public domain Latin texts. It is run by William L. Carey, adjunct professor of Latin and Roman Law at George Mason University. The texts have been drawn from different sources, are not intended for research purposes nor as substitutes for critical editions, and may contain errors. There are no translations at the site.

== See also ==
- Latin literature
- Corpus Corporum
- Library of Latin Texts
