= Erchempert =

Benedictine monk and chronicler

Erchempert (Latin: Erchempertus; fl. 888–889) was a Benedictine monk of the Abbey of Monte Cassino in Italy in the final quarter of the ninth century. He chronicled a history of the Lombard Principality of Benevento, in the Langobardia Minor, giving an especially vivid account of the violence in southern Langobardia. Beginning with Duke Arechis II (758–787) and the Carolingian conquest of Benevento, his history, titled the Historia Langobardorum Beneventanorum degentium (The History of the Lombards living in Benevento), stops abruptly in the winter of 888–889. Just one medieval manuscript of this text survives, from the early fourteenth century.

== Editions ==
- Erchempertus. Georg Waitz, ed. (1878). Historia Langobardorum Beneventanorum (in Latin). In Monumenta Germaniae Historica: Scriptores rerum Langobardicarum et Italicarum saec. VI–IX. Hannoverae: impensis bibliopolii Hahniani. pp. 231–264.
- Erchempert's "History of the Lombards of Benevento": A translation and study of its place in the chronicle tradition - Joan Ferry's PhD thesis from Rice University, which includes an English translation of Erchempert's work
- Erchemperto, Piccola Storia dei Longobardi di Benevento / Ystoriola Longobardorum Beneventum degentium, edition and translation into Italian by L. A. Berto (Naples: Liguori, 2013).
- Luigi Andrea Berto, ed. The Little History of the Lombards of Benevento by Erchempert: A Critical Edition and Translation of ‘Ystoriola Longobardorum Beneventum degentium’. Routledge, 2021.

== Sources ==
- L. A. Berto, “‘Copiare’ e ‘ricomporre’. Alcune ipotesi su come si scriveva nell’Italia meridionale altomedievale e sulla biblioteca di Montecassino nel nono secolo. Il caso della cronaca di Erchemperto” Medieval Sophia, 17, (2015), pp. 83-111. L. A. Berto, “Erchempert, a Reluctant Fustigator of His People: History and Ethnic Pride in Southern Italy at the End of the Ninth Century”, Mediterranean Studies, 20, 2 (2012), pp. 147-175.
- L. A. Berto, “Linguaggio, contenuto, autori e destinatari nella Langobardia meridionale. Il caso della cosiddetta dedica della “Historia Langobardorum Beneventanorum” di Erchemperto“, Viator. Medieval and Renaissance Studies, Multilingual, 43 (2012), pp. 1-14.
- L. A. Berto, “L’immagine delle élites longobarde nella “Historia Langobardorum Beneventanorum” di Erchemperto”, Archivio Storico Italiano, CLXX, 2 (2012), pp. 195-233.
- L. A. Berto, Making History in Ninth-Century Northern and Southern Italy (Pisa: Pisa University Press, 2018), pp. 69-111.
