= Sicard of Benevento =

9th-century Italian prince

Sicard
- Prince of Benevento
- Contemporary effigy of Prince Sicard, from one of his solidi
- Reign: 832–839
- Predecessor: Sico I
- Successor: Radelchis I
- Died: 839

Sicard (died 839) was the Prince of Benevento from 832. He was the last prince of a united Benevento which covered most of the Mezzogiorno. On his death, the principality descended into civil war which split it permanently (except for very briefly under Pandulf Ironhead from 977 to 981). He was the son and successor of the Spoletan Sico.

He warred against the Saracens and his neighbours continually, especially Sorrento, Naples, and Amalfi. He was the strongest military and economic power in the region. By the Pactum Sicardi of 4 July 836, he signed a five-year armistice with the three aforementioned cities and recognised the right of travel of their merchants. Nonetheless, war continued. In a war of 837 with Duke Andrew II of Naples, the latter called in the first Saracens as allies and a trend began, drawing more and more Muslims into Christian wars on the peninsula. He also captured Amalfi in 838 by sea.

Despite his warmaking, he was also a builder. He built a new church in Benevento and to equip it with relics, rescued those of Saint Bartholomew, then in the Lipari Islands, from the Saracens by hiring some Amalfitan merchants to retrieve them. In his capture of Amalfi, he took the relics of Saint Trofimena, recently brought there from Minori, Italy.

Sicard was assassinated in 839 and the treasurer Radelchis immediately proclaimed himself prince. But Sicard's brother, Siconulf, whom he had imprisoned, broke out and was proclaimed prince in Salerno; a ten-year civil war ensued. Sicard's wife Adelchisa's brother Guaifer of Salerno aided Siconulf.

== Notes ==
Regnal titles
| Preceded by Sico | Prince of Benevento; 832–839 | Succeeded by Radelchis I as Prince of Benevento |
| Preceded by Sico | Prince of Benevento; 832–839 | Succeeded by Siconulf as Prince of Salerno |
