= Siconulf of Salerno =

9th-century Italian prince

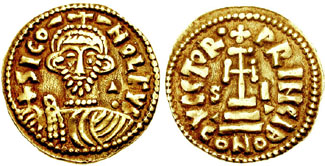
Siconulf's effigy on a solidus minted during his rule in Salerno

Siconulf (also Siconolf, Sikenolf, Siconolfo, or Siconulfus) was the first prince of Salerno, the brother of Sicard, prince of Benevento (832–839), who was assassinated by Radelchis. In response to Sicard's murder, the people of Salerno proclaimed Siconulf prince in opposition to Radelchis. At the time Radelchis was holding Siconulf prisoner in Taranto. A group of people from the cities of Salerno and Amalfi went there in disguise as Amalfian merchants and rescued Siconulf from prison, bringing him to Salerno.

It was Radelchis who first called in the aid of the Saracens against Siconulf in 841, though Siconulf soon retaliated by doing the same against his opponent. The war lasted ten years, during which the Saracen ravages worsened and churches were despoiled. Finally, in 849, the king of Italy, Louis II, came down into Southern Italy and confirmed the division of the Beneventan principality, forcing the two rivals to sign a peace and making Siconulf prince of Salerno. The major cities in the new principality were Taranto, Cassano Irpino, Paestum, Conza, Sarno, Cimitile (Nola), Capua, Teano, and Sora. He died soon after and was succeeded by his son Sico.

== Sources ==
- Gwatkin, H. M., Whitney, J. P., edd. The Cambridge Medieval History: Volume III. Cambridge University Press, 1926.

Regnal titles
Preceded by Sicard as Prince of Benevento	Prince of Salerno; 839–851	Succeeded by Sico II
