= Doctors for Drug Policy Reform =

US NGO advocating for drug policy reform

- Abbreviation: D4DPR
- Formation: September 30, 2015; 10 years ago
- Type: NGO
- Purpose: Evidence-based drug policies that support public health, human rights, social justice, and consumer protections
- Headquarters: Washington, DC
- Region served: International
- President: Bryon Adinoff, MD, DLFAPA, DFAAAP
- Key people: David L. Nathan, MD, DFAPA (founder and past president)
- Website: d4dpr.org

Doctors for Drug Policy Reform, or D4DPR (formerly known as Doctors for Cannabis Regulation, or DFCR) is a 501(c)(3) non-profit organization that serves as a global voice for licensed health professionals and scientists advocating for evidence-based drug policies and best practices that advance public health, reduce stigma, and minimize harm. D4DPR leverage the expertise, compassion, and influence of licensed health professionals to enact changes in drug policy necessary to improve public health, human rights, social justice, and consumer protections. D4DPR, formerly DFCR, was founded in 2015 by David L. Nathan. In 2021, Dr. Bryon Adinoff, an addictionologist, researcher, and editor-in-chief of the American Journal of Drug and Alcohol Abuse succeeded Nathan to become D4DPR's second president.

Over the years, DFCR and D4DPR have had notable leaders, spokespeople, and subject matter experts, including Chris Beyrer, Joycelyn Elders, Lester Grinspoon, Peter Grinspoon, Carl Hart, Julie Holland, David C. Lewis, Ethan Nadelmann, David Nutt, Beny Primm, Andrew Solomon, Andrew Weil, and Ken Wolski.

== Testimony and media appearances ==
Board members, spokespeople, and a panel of experts work to change drug policy through public testimony, lectures, op-eds, media appearances, research, and support for legislation individually and as part of larger coalitions. Testimony has been given to legislators in Alabama, California, Colorado, Connecticut, Delaware, Hawaii, Illinois, Kansas, Maryland, Massachusetts, Montana, New Hampshire, New Jersey, New York, Oregon, Pennsylvania, Rhode Island, South Carolina, Texas, Vermont, Virginia, and the United States House of Representatives. On July 10, 2019, David L. Nathan testified before a subcommittee of the United States House Judiciary Committee in support of cannabis legalization.

D4DPR physicians have appeared in dozens of media outlets worldwide. DFCR's first major coverage came in April 2016 by The Washington Post where it made a notable break from other medical professional organizations by endorsing the legalization of cannabis for adult consumption, arguing that prohibition does far more harm to the public than good.

In 2017 David L. Nathan and D4DPR honorary board members, former Substance Abuse and Mental Health Services Administration clinical director H. Westley Clark and former U.S. Surgeon General Joycelyn Elders, co-published a landmark op-ed supporting cannabis legalization in the American Journal of Public Health titled "The Physicians' Case for Marijuana Legalization."

New York Governor Andrew Cuomo directed the state's Department of Health in 2018 to "conduct a study in consultation with other state agencies to review, including but not limited to, the health, criminal justice and economic impacts of a regulated marijuana program in the state of New York, including the implications for the state of New York resulting from marijuana legalization in surrounding states." The resulting commission report cited DFCR's Declaration of Principles and found that regulating cannabis "reduces risks and improves quality control and consumer protection."

== NFL campaign ==
In 2017, DFCR launched a campaign with numerous current and former NFL players to change cannabis policy in the National Football League. As part of its initiative, DFCR worked with former NFL running back Mike James to file the first therapeutic use exemption with the league in May 2018, though it was ultimately denied. In April 2020 the NFL changed its policy regarding cannabis after signing a new collective bargaining agreement with the National Football League Players Association, decreasing but not eliminating penalties for players.

== International Intoxicating Cannabinoid Product Symbol and ASTM D8441 ==
In collaboration with standards organization ASTM International, D4DPR created the International Intoxicating Cannabinoid Product Symbol (IICPS), which was designed by Nathan and University of Pennsylvania design student Eli Nathan. Committee D37 of ASTM International approved the IICPS as the world's first and only cannabis product symbol to bear the designation of an international voluntary consensus standard. The standard was published as ASTM D8441 in February 2022. As of mid-2023, the IICPS had been incorporated into the universal symbols required for cannabis packages in the states of Montana, New Jersey, South Dakota and Vermont.

== 2023 expansion and name change ==
In October 2023, DFCR announced its rebrand under a new name, Doctors for Drug Policy Reform (D4DPR), empowering the organization to address a wider range of drug policy issues beyond cannabis. D4DPR's goals include maximizing health and wellness, harm reduction, and the legalization of both cannabis and psychedelics.

Following D4DPR's expansion, the non-profit organization International Doctors for Healthier Drug Policies merged with D4DPR under the name of the latter.

== See also ==
- Americans for Safe Access
- Drug Policy Alliance
- Marijuana Policy Project
- Law Enforcement Action Partnership
- NORML (National Organization for the Reform of Marijuana Laws)
- Prohibition
- Students for Sensible Drug Policy
- War on drugs
