= David L. Nathan =

American psychiatrist, writer, founder of Doctors for Drug Policy Reform

David L. Nathan (born 1968) is an American psychiatrist, writer, and founder and past president of Doctors for Drug Policy Reform. Best known for his advocacy of cannabis legalization, evidence-based drug policy reform, and standardized cannabis labeling, he has also published research in the academic and lay press on a range of other topics, including archeology, numismatics, the history of animation and early American football.

Nathan has a private practice in Princeton, New Jersey. He is the Director of Continuing Education at the Penn Medicine Princeton Health and a clinical associate professor at Rutgers Robert Wood Johnson Medical School.

== Early life ==
Originally from the Philadelphia area, Nathan graduated magna cum laude from Princeton University. He received his M.D. from the University of Pennsylvania School of Medicine, where he distinguished himself in the development of medical education software. He subsequently competed his psychiatry residency at McLean Hospital, an affiliate of Harvard Medical School, serving as Chief Resident of Bipolar and Psychotic Disorders in 1993–1994.

== Cannabis legalization ==
Drawing from his experience in clinical psychiatry and the treatment of substance use disorders, Nathan is a vocal physician advocate of cannabis legalization. He has published numerous articles on the topic. Nathan was one of the founding steering committee members of New Jersey United for Marijuana Reform, speaking at their televised launch in early 2015. He was the first physician in New Jersey history to testify about marijuana legalization at the state legislature later that year. In July 2019, Nathan was one of the first physicians to testify before the Judiciary Committee of the U.S. House of Representatives.

In 2016, Nathan founded Doctors For Cannabis Regulation (DFCR), which advocates for the legalization, regulation and taxation of marijuana. In 2021, DFCR expanded its mission and changed its name to Doctors for Drug Policy Reform. He was principal author of the organization's “Declaration of Principles,” which was signed by number of nationally prominent physicians, including Joycelyn Elders, Andrew Weil, Chris Beyrer, David Lewis, and Lester Grinspoon.

Since 2020, Nathan has advocated standard labeling of cannabis products. Along with his son Eli, a graphic designer, he designed the Universal Cannabis Product Symbol (UCPS). The UCPS was refined and renamed the International Intoxicating Cannabinoid Product Symbol (IICPS) and became the first and only international consensus standard when approved by ASTM International in 2022, now bearing the designation ASTM D8441/D8441M. Montana was the first U.S. state to adopt the IICPS in late 2021. Ten states have subsequently incorporated the IICPS design into their state symbols.

== Other selected publications and projects ==
In archeology, Nathan published an analysis of a proto-cuneiform tablet dating to the Jemdet Nasr period of Mesopotamia (circa 3100-3000 BCE), which included the discovery of a previously unknown numerical sign.

In numismatics, Nathan proposed that the first coins minted in the Western Hemisphere feature a Hebrew letter aleph (א), suggesting direct evidence for a Jewish presence or influence in the New World as early as 1536. He noted that nearly all of the coin dies prepared under the tenure of the Mexican Mint's first assayer use this purported aleph symbol in place of the Christian cross potent mark found almost universally on medieval Spanish and Mexican coinage. Nathan also considered possible Jewish family connections to the known early Mexican mint workers.

While researching the history of early animation, Nathan reconstructed the lost “Encore” sequence from Winsor McCay’s animated film Gertie using original drawings from 1914. With animation historian Donald Crafton, he coauthored an article about the structure and history of Gertie. Nathan initiated a restoration of the entire film and a reconstruction of McCay's original vaudeville performance of Gertie. Crafton, Nathan and Marco de Blois of the Cinémathèque québécoise worked with a team of professionals from the National Film Board of Canada to complete the project, which premiered live during the closing ceremony of the 2018 Annecy Film Festival in France.

Publishing in the Princeton Alumni Weekly, Nathan was the first to identify all 24 known members of Princeton University’s 1869 football team, who participated in the first intercollegiate American football game. He published biographies and photographs of all the known players and shared his research into the possible identity of the unknown 25th player.

== Awards and honors ==
In 1990, Nathan received Princeton's Charles M. Cannon Memorial Prize for his senior thesis entitled Web Repair in Several Species of Orb Weaving Spiders. In 2007, Nathan won the Odesser Award for Outstanding Contribution to Judaic Numismatics and Exonumia for his article on early Mexican coins. In 2012, Nathan was elected as a Distinguished Fellow of the American Psychiatric Association.
