= Coinage of Adelchis of Benevento =

Coinage of Adelchis, prince of Benevento

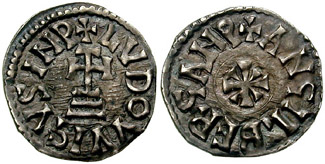
Adelchis: denier
+LVDOVVICVS INP, cross potent on steps	+ANGILBERGA NP, baptismal cross
AR Denier (1,13 g), in the name of Louis II and Angilberga.

The coinage of Adelchis, prince of Benevento, constitutes a special chapter in the Lombard coinage of Benevento and bears witness to the political changes that took place during his principality. The period in which Adelchis minted runs from 854, when he became prince of Benevento, to 878; his coinage is centered on the denier, a silver coinage that became widespread in Europe following Charlemagne's rise to power.

The fortunes of Adelchis' principality are linked to a remarkably turbulent historical period, punctuated by wars in which Emperor Louis II was involved. The latter tried to place the principality within his own sphere of power, but Adelchis, after many vicissitudes, managed to retain control of it. These events are reflected and represented by the various types that followed one another in the issues: at first with the presence of Adelchis' name alone, then Adelchis' name with the emperor's name next to it, later without Adelchis' name but with the emperor's name, either alone or with his wife, and finally with Adelchis' name flanked by that of the pope, John VIII.

== Cataloging and sources ==
In Philip Grierson and Mark Blackburn's text, Medieval European Coinage (MEC), of the coinage struck during Adelchis' principality only six coins out of eighteen known are listed and described with the aid of photographs. Despite the scant prominence given to Adelchis' coinage the MEC is nevertheless used as a reference in catalogs with indications such as "MEC 1, 1113," where MEC indicates the initials of the series, 1 the first volume, and 1113 the 1113th coin in the catalog. Coins pertinent to the coinage of Adelchis, all in the first volume, are catalogued from 1113 to 1118. The individual coins analyzed in the volume and used in the illustrations are those in the collection of the Fitzwilliam Museum in Cambridge.

Another cataloging source, equally used, is the BMC Vand, that is, the catalog of coins of the Vandals and other peoples, found in the British Museum, edited by Warwick William Wroth and published in London in 1911. Adelchis' coinage is mentioned within the framework of Benevento coinage, and the coins in the museum are depicted in Table XXV (4-6) and described from pages 183 to 186. Types not in the collection are also described.

Less internationally used but more detailed are the studies published in Italy by Giulio Sambon in 1912, those contained in vol. XVIII of the CNI (Corpus Nummorum Italicorum) and Memmo Cagiati's text of 1916-17. In particular, Cagiati's text lists all the specimens then known with their description, representing them through drawings.

== Historical context ==
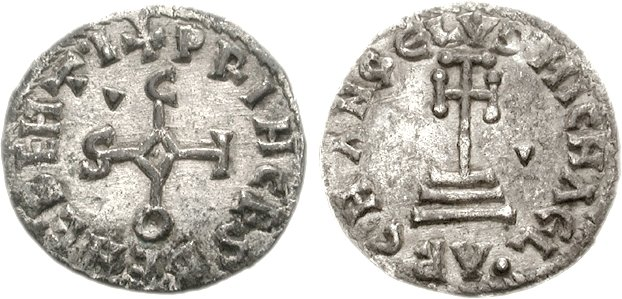
Sico: denier
+ PRIHCES BEHEBEH • TI*, SICO monogram joined by a cross with a central quadrangle; wedge in the first quarter	• ΛRCHΛNGELVS MICHΛЄL, cross potent on two steps; wedge to the right
AR 1,17 g, 3h

After the annexation of the Lombard kingdom to the Carolingian empire (774), the Benevento domain had remained the only one of the Lombard territories to retain its de facto independence, despite the fragmentation of its territories around 840. Adelchis was prince from 854 until his death in May 878. He was Radelchis' son and succeeded his brother Radelgar as the latter's son Gaideris was still in infancy.

The independence of the principality was threatened by the continuing assaults of the Saracens in the south, pressure from Emperor Louis II from the north, and pressure from the Byzantines stationed in the theme of Longobardia in the east.

In 860 Adelchis was defeated at Bari by Muslim forces and then sought help from the Frankish emperor Louis II, who defeated the Saracens in 866 and recaptured Bari in 871. Louis II then sought to consolidate his control over the principality by quartering troops in Benevento's fortresses. Adelchis reacted by taking the emperor prisoner while he was a guest in the princely palace in Benevento.

These events are reflected in the coinage issued under his principality.

== Coinage ==
First period, first type
+ ADEL • PRIN; in the field in three lines.	• ARHANGEMIHAE; cross set aside by lozenges.

First period, second type
ADELHIS — • — PRINCE; cross on three steps.	A • RHANGELVMICHAEL; cross potent decorated with rosettes.

First period, third type
SANCTA MARIA; in the field letters P / ADL / R (Adelchis Princeps) arranged in a cross.	+ ARHNGELVΠIH; cross.

First period, fifth type
ADELGISI PRINCE; Cross juxtaposed by the letters Α and ω.	+ ARHANGELVSΠIHA; S Π A R monogram (Sancta Maria).

First period, sixth type
ADELCHIS PRIN; carolingian temple.	S•C•A•M ARIA (Sancta Maria); cross on three steps juxtaposed on the right by two small globes.

First period, seventh type
ADELCHIS monogram surmounted by ∇; on the right a monstrance, on the left a cross.	• BENE – • – BENTV; cross on three steps set aside by the letters M and H (Mihael).

Second period, first type
+ LVDOVVICVS IMPE; spike with two stems set aside by letters A and R (Archangelus).	ADELHIS PRINCES (mirrored S); patriarchal cross set aside by letters M and H (Mihael)

Second period, second type
In the field, in four lines I / LVDO / VVICV / P (Ludovicus Imperator)	+ ARHANGELMIHAEL ADELHIS. In the center in three lines P / ADEL / R (Adelchis Princeps)

By the time Adelchis became prince, no gold coins had been minted in Benevento for about fifteen years, and the only coinage metal remained silver. The principality had thus aligned itself with the prevailing trend in Europe.

=== Background ===
The minted silver coin was the denier, the coinage of which in the principality had begun, alongside the production of gold coins, with Grimoald III (787-806) when Charlemagne had already conquered the Lombard kingdom in 774. The deniers had similar characteristics to those minted in the same period by the papacy and the Franks. Recurrent types were those with a monogram of the prince's name and the cross on the steps used in solidi and tremisses.

With Grimoald IV (806-817) a new type had appeared: on the obverse an ear of corn and on the reverse a cross juxtaposed by four lozenges. Also with the same prince in the legends of the deniers was placed the dedication to the archangel Michael; the archangel was protector and symbol of the Lombards and was the object of special worship.

Under Sico (817-832), who succeeded Grimoald, the earlier types were again used, with the obverse bearing the legend PRIHCES BEHEBEH - TI around the cruciform monogram SICO and the reverse bearing the traditional long cross of the Lombards with the legend dedicated to the archangel Michael.

Under Sico's son and successor, Sicard (832-839), a new cruciform monogram with the letters SICARD was used in the deniers.

=== Adelchis ===
Adelchis' coinage reflects the international political problems experienced by the principality of Benevento during his time as prince. The coinage is divided into four periods, each of which - with the exception of the fourth - has multiple types.

	Period	Known types
Adelchis alone	853-867	7
Adelchis and Louis	867-870	2
Louis, alone or with Angilberga	870-871	7
Adelchis and John VIII	871	1

==== First period ====
The first period of Adelchis' coinage was that which bore only the prince's name and is attested from 853 to 867. There were seven types used.

The first one on the obverse presented in the field, on three lines, the legend + / ADEL' / PRIN and on the reverse a cross set aside by four lozenges, surrounded by the legend - ARHANGEMIHAE ("Archangel Michael"), very similar to the reverse of the deniers of Grimoald IV with the spike, part of the Lombard coinage of Benevento. The title used was that of prince and the dedication was to the archangel Michael.

The second type had the traditional cross on steps on the obverse with the legend ADELHIS PRINCE around it, while on the reverse, within the legend A - RHANGELVMICHAEL, there was a cross, potent in the horizontal shaft and with seven globules on each arm of the vertical shaft.

The third type had in the field the letters P ADL R (Adelchi Princeps) arranged in three lines to form a cross, surrounded by the legend + SANCTA MARIA.

The fourth type had the cruciform monogram SΠAR (Sancta Maria) in the center and the cross potent on the reverse, while in the fifth one the cross, Latin this time, was on the obverse, set aside by the letters Α and ω; the cruciform monogram SΠAR was on the reverse. Cagiati lists two variants for this coin, with minor differences in the legends. In both coins the letter "M" of Mary's monogram is written similarly to the letter "Π" (capital pi) of the Greek alphabet.

The sixth type featured the so-called "Carolingian temple," already used by Charlemagne. In his fourth coinage, dated 812-814, Charles had introduced the type of deniers with an imperial, Roman-style portrait used for the obverse. One of the reverses featured a peristyle (i.e., four-columned) temple surrounded by the legend XPICTIANA RELIGIO (Christiana religio), in which Greek letters were also used in the Latin text: "Χ" (chi), "Ρ" (rho) and "С" (lunate sigma), instead of "ch," "r" and "s," respectively. The temple motif was also used in the coinage of Louis the Pious, with differences in the legend, which became XPISTIANA RELIGIO with the letter "S" instead of Charles' lunate sigma. The temple used by Adelchis had a tympanum on the apex of which was a cross, while there were two columns, separated by a small cross placed in the center. The legend was ADELCHIS PRIN. The reverse depicted a cross on steps surrounded by the legend S-C-A-M ARIA (Sancta Maria).

The seventh type presented on the obverse a monogram of the name Adelchis surmounted by a "∇" and flanked on the right by a cross and on the left by a monstrance. On the reverse the coin featured the legend - BENE - - - BENTV around a cross on three steps flanked by the letters "M" and "H" (for Michael Angelus). This coin featured types taken from a denier minted by Grimoald III more than half a century earlier; in the latter denier the monogram on the obverse consisted of the letters forming Grimoald's name. On the reverse of Grimoald's denier the cross was set aside by the first and last letters of the Greek alphabet (Α and ω).

==== Second period ====
In the second period the name of Louis II appeared alongside the name of Adelchis. After the reconquest of Bari, Louis had settled in Benevento. This situation is evidenced by the issues of this period, those of the years 867-871, which saw deniers coined with the joint names of Adelchis and Louis II. There were two types used in this second period.

The first had on the obverse the image of the ear already used by Grimoald IV with the legend + LVDOVICVSIMPE around it; on the reverse, a patriarchal cross set aside by the letters "M" and "H" (for Michael) and the legend + ADELHIS PRINCES, with the last "S" mirrored.

The other denier on the obverse had in the field the legend I | LVDO | VVICV | ^ P ^ (Ludovicus Imperator) and on the reverse the letters P ADEL R (Adelchis princeps) arranged on three lines to form a cross, while around it was the legend + ARHANGELMIHAEL.

==== Third period ====
In the third period, deniers were issued in Louis' name alone or with his wife Angilberga; these coins are dated between the years 870 and 871.

In this case the types used were mostly taken from earlier imperial coinage: the Carolingian temple, the cross with the legend + XPSTIANARELIGI (christiana religio) and others. In a group of coins the legend BENVENTV CIBI, BENEVENTUM or similar appears.

In other coins the name of Louis' wife appeared in the form of ANGILBERGA, accompanied by titles such as DMA (domina), IMP (imperatrix) or AGVSTA (augusta), with various spellings.

Fourth period
+ ADELGI • PRN; in the field cruciform monogram IOHA	In the field SCAMR (Sancta Maria); at the top and bottom two rosettes

As many as seven types are known for this period, which, with variations, add up to thirteen different coins; Cagiati identifies them with the letters "A" to "G."

	Obverse	Reverse
A	+ LVDOVVICVS IMPE; baptismal cross	BENEBENTI CIBI; carolingian temple
B	+ IM / LVDO / VVICV P :• (Ludovicus Imperator) on four lines in the field	+ XPSTIANARELIGI (mirrored S); long rod cross set aside by ω and Α;
C	+ HLVDOVICVS (horizontal S) I̅M̅P̅ R; cross in a beaded circle	BENE / BEN / TVM in the field on three lines
D	+ DOMLVDOVVICVS; I̅M̅P̅ in the field	+ DMA • ANGILBERGA; I̅M̅P̅ in the field
E	+ LVDOVICVS INP; cross on steps; small globe at left.	+ • / ANGIL / BERGA / INP in the field on four lines.
F	+ LVDOVIGVS INP; cross on steps.	+ ANGILBERGA NP; baptismal cross.
G	+ LVDOVICVS IMPE; cruciform monogram with the letters ACVS (Agustus).	+ ANGILBERGA IΠP; in the center AGV / STA on two lines.

==== Fourth period ====
In the fourth period coins were minted in the joint name of Adelchis and Pope John VIII. From this period, dated 871, only one type is known, which had on the obverse the legend ADELGI - PRN around a cruciform monogram with the letters IOHA (Iohannes, the pope's name in Latin) and on the reverse, in the field, the legend SCAMR (Sancta Maria).

== See also ==
- Duchy of Benevento
- Lombards
- Lombard coinage
- Lombard coinage of Benevento

== Bibliography ==
Lombard coinage

- Bernareggi, Ernesto (1983). Moneta Langobardorum. Milan: Cisalpino Goliardica.
- Memmo Cagiati (1916–17). La zecca di Benevento. Milano. (anastatic reprint: ISBN 9788827109571.
- Philip Grierson; Mark Blackburn (2007). Medieval European Coinage (MEC) - Volume 1, The Early Middle Ages (5th–10th Centuries). Cambridge University Press. (Benevento coins are introduced and analyzed on pages 66–72 and illustrated in Tables 50 and 51)
- Sambon, Arthur (June 1908). "Recueil des monnaies de l'Italie méridionale. Bénévent". Le Musée (in French). Reprinted along with other works: Sambon, Arthur (1919). Recueil des monnaies du sud de l'Italie avant le domination des Normands (in French). Paris.
- Sambon, Giulio (1912). Repertorio generale delle monete coniate in Italia e da Italiani all'estero dal secolo V al XX. Paris. pp. Vol. I: Periodo dal 476 al 1566. (anastatic reprint: ISBN 9788827113608).
- CNI (Corpus Nummorum Italicorum), vol. XVIII.

Catalogs

- Warwick William Wroth (1911). Catalogue of the coins of the Vandals, Ostrogoths and Lombards, and of the empires of Thessalonica, Nicaea and Trebizond in the British museum. Londra. (Benevento coins are introduced and analyzed on pages lxi-lxviii and described on pages 155-192. Images are in tables XXI-XXV)
