= Lombard coinage of Benevento =

Lombard coinage of Benevento, Italy

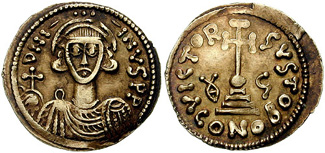
Gisulf II (742-751), in the name of Justinian II: solidus
DNI – – INVSPP; crowned bust in front, holding a globus cruciger	VICTOR [A]GVSTO, cross potent on base; monogram on the left and G on the right; in exergue CONOB
AV at low title; 3,92 g

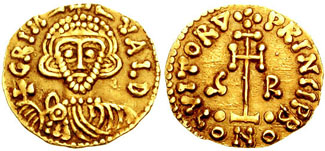
Grimoald III: tremissis
GRIM- -VALD, crowned bust in front, globus cruciger in right hand	VITOR∇ +PRINCIP, cross potent; on the sides: G R; in exergue C•ONO•B.
Electrum 1,2 g. Struck as prince, 792-806

The Lombard coinage of Benevento, part of the more general Lombard coinage, is the set of coins minted between about 680 and the end of the ninth century in the duchy and principality of Benevento. Solidi and tremisses, both gold coins that imitated those of the Eastern Roman Empire, were first minted; later followed the issuance of coins in the names first of the dukes and then of the Benevento princes. Toward the end of the 8th century alongside the gold coins were minted silver coins, which gradually took the place of the earlier ones, as moreover happened in the rest of Western Europe. Silver became the prevalent coinage metal only from the mid-9th century.

The coins of the Lombard dukes of Benevento have their own characters that distinguish them from those of the Lombards settled in northern Italy (Langobardia Maior): in the north the coinage was directed almost exclusively to tremisses, in Benevento solidi were also minted, and inspiration was drawn from Byzantine models even when in Langobardia Maior, towards the end of the seventh century from the reign of Cunipert, royal titles were inserted on the coins and new types adopted. After the fall of the Lombard kingdom, for about another century, the coins retained their characteristics.

Alongside the coinage of Benevento is also studied that of the principality of Salerno, which originated in about 839 following the fragmentation of the principality of Benevento.

== Cataloging and sources ==
The duchy of Benevento in the 8th century

=== Benevento coins ===
For coins minted by the Lombards in Benevento, the most recent text is the one published by Philip Grierson and Mark Blackburn, the first volume of the Medieval European Coinage series. In the catalogs one finds references such as "MEC I, 1085," where MEC indicates the initials of the series, I indicates the first volume, and 1085 the 1085th coin in the catalog. The coins pertaining to the Lombard mint of Benevento, all in the first volume, are catalogued from 1085 to 1119. The individual coins analyzed in the volume and used in the illustrations are those in the collection of the Fitzwilliam Museum in Cambridge.

Another cataloging source, equally used, is the Catalogue of the coins of the Vandals, Ostrogoths and Lombards, and of the empires of Thessalonica, Nicaea and Trebizond in the British museum edited by Warwick William Wroth and published in London in 1911.

Less internationally used but more detailed are the studies published in Italy by Giulio Sambon in 1912, by Memmo Cagiati in 1916-17 and those contained in vol. XVIII of the Corpus Nummorum Italicorum (CNI). In particular, Cagiati's text lists all the specimens then known with their descriptions, using drawings by Andrea Russo, a 19th-century Neapolitan illustrator, for representation. More recent is Enrico Catemario di Quadri's 1953 work analyzing Benevento coins belonging to a private collection and published in the Bollettino del Circolo numismatico Napoletano. Also published in Numismatic Chronicle in 1974 was an analysis by W. Andrew Oddy of the gold coinage of Benevento, again based on the collection of the Fitzwilliam Museum in Cambridge.

=== Imperial coins ===
In the first half of the 8th century coins minted in Benevento had legends with the names of emperors of the Eastern Roman Empire.

The names used are those of Constantine IV (668-685) and Justinian II (685-695 and 704-711). Two relatively recent publications are used in cataloging the coins of these emperors: the Catalogue of the Byzantine Coins in the Dumbarton Oaks Collection and in the Whittemore Collection, abbreviated DOC, and Wolfgang Hahn's text Moneta Imperii Byzantini, abbreviated MIB. The imitated coins are listed in the second volume of DOC and the third volume of MIB.

== Historical context ==
Dukes and princes
in the period 689-910

Dukes

- 689–706 Gisulf I
- 706–731 Romuald II
- 731–732 Gisulf II
- 732 Audelais
- 732–739 Gregory
- 739–742 Godescalc
- 742–751 Gisulf II
- 751–758 Liutprand
- 758–774 Arechis II

Princes

- 774–787 Arechis II
- 787–806 Grimoald III
- 806–817 Grimoald IV
- 817–832 Sico I
- 832–839 Sicard
- 839–850 Radelchis I
- 850-853 Radelgar
- 853–877 Adelchis
- 877–879 Gaideris
- 879–881 Radelchis II
- 881–890 Aiulf II
- 890–891 Ursus
- Byzantine rule
- 895–897 Guy
  - 897 Peter, bishop of Benevento and regent
- 897–900 Radelchis II
- 900–910 Atenulf I

The Lombards conquered southern Italy (Langobardia Minor) after 570 and in time formed a state extending over most of the peninsular south of Italy, with the exceptions of present-day Calabria, part of Apulia (almost the entire Salentine peninsula) and the city of Naples with its hinterland, territories that remained under the control of the Eastern Roman Empire.

The Roman Duchy, under papal control, and the Lombard Duchy of Spoleto separated the Duchy of Benevento from the Lombard territories in northern Italy, and as a result the Duchy enjoyed between the 6th and 7th centuries considerable autonomy within the Lombard kingdom of Italy. Its destinies were closely linked to the royal crown only during the reign of King Grimoald (662-671), formerly duke of Benevento, and in the 8th century, from the reign of Liutprand (712-744) to the fall of the kingdom (774). After the annexation of the Lombard kingdom to the Carolingian empire, however, the Benevento domain remained the only one of the Lombard territories to maintain its de facto independence for still nearly three hundred years, despite the fragmentation of its territories that occurred around 840.

== Coinage ==
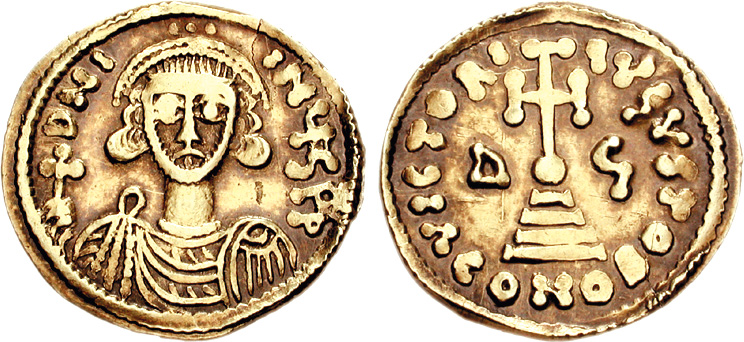
Godescalc (739-742): solidus
D N I-INЧS P P; crowned and draped bust in front, holding a globus cruciger; crown surmounted by three points.	VICTORI IVGVSTO; cross potent on a globe placed on four steps; D-G in the field; CONOB in exergue.
AV (low-titled), 3,90 g, 6h, cfr. MEC I

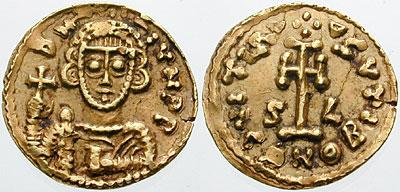
Liutprand: tremissis
DN IVNPP; crowned bust in front, in right hand globus cruciger, akakia on left.	VITIR∇ ∇GVT; cross potent, S L on the sides, in exergue CONOB.
AV 1,28 g.

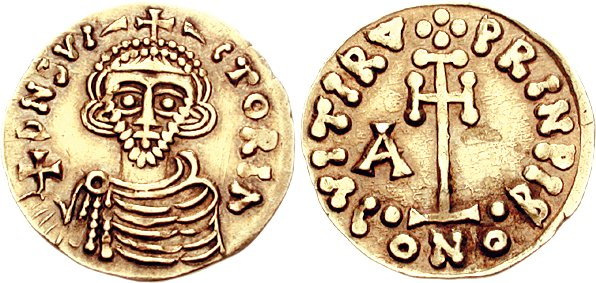
Arechis II: tremissis
DNS VI CTORIΛ; crowned bust, with a globus cruciger.	VITIR∇— PRINPI; cross potent; A on the right, in exergue C ONO B.
AV 1,20 g; the coin bears the title of prince

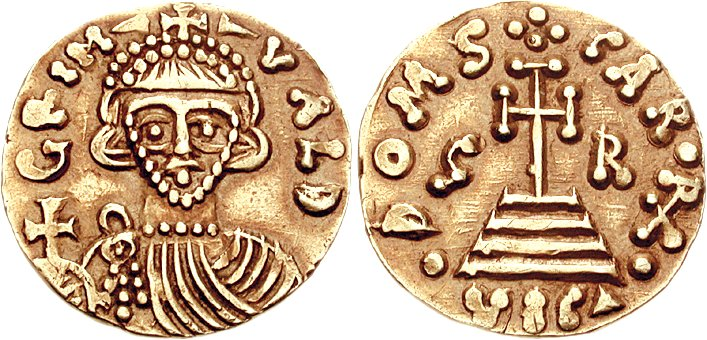
Grimoald III and Charlemagne: solidus
GRIM - VALD, crowned bust in front, holding a globus cruciger.	DOMS CAR• ℞, cross potent on three steps; on the sides G R; on top four points, in exergue VICΔ.
AV 3,87 g, 6h, 2nd type.

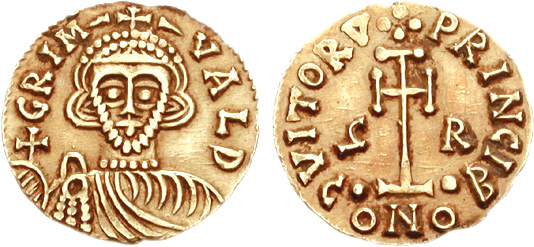
Grimoald III: tremissis
GRIM– –VALD, crowned and draped bust, with a globus cruciger; crown surmounted by cross.	VITOR∇ PRINCI, cross potent; in the field G-R, each with • below; in exergue CONOB.
AV 1,32 g, 6h.

Grimoald IV: denier
• GRIMOALD FILIVS ERMENRIH; ear of corn.	• ARCHANGELVS MICHAEL; cross set aside by four spindles.
cfr. Cagiati, 1-2. BMC Vand, pl. XXIII, 14-17

Solido
SICO PRINCES; bust of Sico, with beard, standing in front, on head crown with cross; on right globus cruciger.	ARCHANGELVS MICHAEL; Archangel Michael, winged, standing in front; crosier on right, globus cruciger on left. In exergue CONO (instead of CONOB).
Electrum solidus (about 3.85 g).

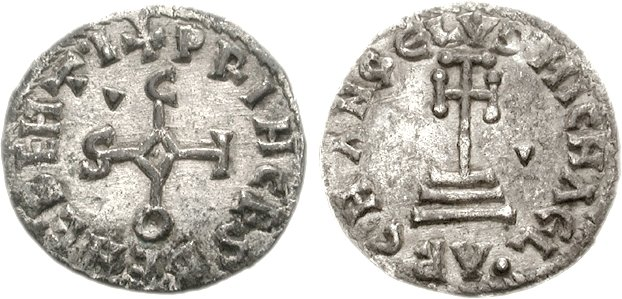
Sico: denier
+ PRIHCES BEHEBEH • TI*, SICO monogram joined by a cross with a central quadrangle; wedge in the first quarter	• ΛRCHΛNGELVS MICHΛЄL, cross potent on two steps; wedge to the right
AR 1,17 g, 3h

Benevento was the only one of the great Lombard duchies to have its own coinage, clearly distinct from that of the Lombard kingdom. The prevailing type featured on the obverse a bust in front and on the reverse a cross potent resting on a base (simple for the tremissis, of three or four steps for the solidus). The difference between the two reverses was the same as that in use in imperial coinage of the time, which allows easy identification of the coin's value. The types used for the reverse remained constant throughout the period of gold coinage, with one exception during the principality of Sico.

The earliest coinage of the duchy, like that of all coeval Germanic peoples, consisted of the so-called pseudo-imperial coins, that is, more or less faithful imitations of the coins of the Roman Empire. These coins copied those that were already in circulation in the conquered area. Later coins were differentiated by the addition of letters, monograms or other symbols that indicated in some way the name of the ruling duke. Only in a third phase were new legends used, different from the imperial ones.

The first to affix his own name was Grimoald III (787-806), already in the period when the duchy had been elevated to a principality; the types, however, were still imitations of those of imperial coins. Under Grimoald III silver coinage also began, following a practice that had already become widespread in Western Europe. Under Sicard the minting of gold ended for good, and the Duchy of Benevento, like much of coeval Western Europe, also used denier as its main currency.

=== Pseudo-imperial coinage ===
The beginning of Benevento's coinage is in the late 7th century, with the minting of solidi and pseudo-imperial tremisses.

The earliest coins cannot be precisely attributed to a specific duke. The coins were imitations of those issued by the Eastern Roman Empire under the names of Constans II and Constantine IV.

=== Ducal coinage ===
The earliest coins that can definitely be attributed are those of Gisulf I, who was duke from 689 to 706. These coins were also imitations of imperial coins, copies of those of Tiberius III (698-704) and Justinian II (second reign, 704-711). Under Gisulf the types used were two. In the first the obverse depicted the emperor with armor, spear and shield, the reverse a cross potent on a base; this coin was copied from a coin of Tiberius III. In the second type the emperor's bust is depicted with the loros; in one hand he holds a cross potent and in the other a globus cruciger, the cross of which is also enhanced; on the globe is the legend PAX. The reverse of this coin depicted the bust of Christ from the front. The model was a solidus of Justinian II, issued during his second reign. These two types were used exclusively under Gisulf I.

Beginning with the rise of Romuald II a third type was introduced, with the bust of the emperor holding the globus cruciger on the obverse. This type imitated coins issued under the early reign of Justinian II and was used in the coinage of Benevento until the middle of the reign of Godescalc (c. 740). The inscriptions used were those of Justinian's coins. According to Grierson and Blackburn the type was probably chosen because of the familiarity of the Benevento Lombards with this type, which was used by many emperors during the 7th century.

Under Godescalc a new type was introduced, with the imperial bust holding the akakia in his left hand, in addition to the globus cruciger that was in his right hand. According to Grierson and Blackburn, the type imitates the solidi of Leo III (717-741), although it had been introduced earlier by Anastasius II (713-715). In particular, the legends in these coins are of the type DN LEOPP or DNL - EOPPAGVS. These types are also seen in the coins of Liutprand and those of the early years of Arechis II.

With Arechis II the type was again changed. The theme returned that of the bust with the globus cruciger, but the obverse no longer had the pseudo-imperial legend, instead reading DNS VICTORIA. The date of this new type is placed around 770 and, according to Grierson and Blackburn, the legend probably alludes to the victory, achieved in 765 over the Neapolitans.

=== Coinage of the principality ===
In 774, still under Arechis, the duchy was transformed into a principality and the new legend "PRINPI" appeared on the reverse of the coins. The type, with some minor variations in the tunic, was also used under Grimoald III and until the end of the gold coinage of Benevento. With Grimoald III the legend with the prince's name written in full was used for the first time: previously there was only the initial of the duke's name on the reverse, with or without the indication of the title, expressed either with the letter D or with a monogram (ɵV for dvx). Grimoald's coinage is divided into two periods that testify to changes in the foreign policy of the principality. Grimoald obtained permission from Charlemagne, who had become rex Francorum et Langobardorum, to reenter the principality and assume its crown, though he undertook to mint coinage and issue documents exclusively in Charlemagne's name and to require the Lombards to wear their chins shaved in accordance with Frankish custom.

In the first period (788-792) coins were thus minted in the joint name of Grimoald and Charles: they bore the obverse legend GRIM- + -VAL and the monogram DX (dux), while on the reverse the legend read DOMS CAR - with the monogram ℞, for rex. "CAR" is Charlemagne. At this time, Grimoald thus had to give up the title of prince and use only that of duke, with the exergue VIC (or VICΔ) in the position usually occupied by CONOB. For this legend Wroth speculates that it is an abbreviation of VICTORIA previously used by Arechis. In this period deniers were minted for the first time, again in the names of Grimoald and Charles.

Later Grimoald ended his good relations with the Franks and managed to defend his autonomy. In this second period, coins were minted only in the name of the Lombard prince. Grimoald allied himself with the Eastern Emperor and married his niece; the principality suffered attacks from Frankish armies but the prince was able to cope. In the new coinage CONOB and the title PRINCI, both absent in the coinage of the first period, reappeared in the exergue.

=== Silver coinage ===
With Grimoald alongside the production of gold coins, silver coinage began. Deniers with similar characteristics to those issued in the same period by the papacy and the Frankish kingdom were minted.

The first deniers of Grimoald III bore on the obverse the monogram used by Charlemagne in his coins, and on the reverse that of Grimoald. The types also changed in the deniers after 792: on the obverse was placed the name of Grimoald, with a new monogram, and on the reverse the cross potent on steps flanked by the letters "A" and "ω."

Under Grimoald IV, successor to Grimoald III, a dedication to the archangel Michael began to appear on the reverse. The archangel was the protector and symbol of the Lombards, and was the object of special worship. Moreover, the sanctuary of St. Michael the Archangel on Gargano, dedicated to the archangel, was located right in the territory of the principality of Benevento. No gold coins were minted under this prince. Grimoald did not sign himself as prince but simply as Grimoald, son of Hermeric. The deniers of Grimoald IV presented quite distinctive types: on the obverse the legend - GRIMOALD FILIVS ERMENRIH[I] surrounds an ear of wheat, which could be presented between recumbent stems or between leaves; on the reverse the legend - ARCHANGELVS MICHAEL surrounded a cross, with arms of equal length, juxtaposed by four lozenges.

Gold coinage resumed under Sico, who continued the dedication to the archangel Michael and introduced the new type with the image of the archangel on the reverse and the legend ΛRCHANGELVS MICHΛЄL with its variants. The coin is described as follows by Cagiati: "Figure of the archangel Michael in prospect; holding in his right hand a crosier, in his left a cross, a small triangle below." This type was used in Byzantine coinage throughout the 7th century. Sico used this type only for solidi; for tremisses the traditional type with the cross potent was used, but the legend again was ΛRCHANGELVS MICHΛЄL. Under Sico continued the coinage of money with the legend PRIHCES BEHEBEH - TI on the obverse around the cruciform monogram SICO. The variants were particularly numerous: Cagiati describes as many as 25. The type with the monarch's monogram on the obverse and a cross on the reverse is similar to that of Charlemagne's deniers; unlike the Frankish coins, however, where a Greek cross was depicted, the traditional cross potent on steps was used in Sico's coins. As already seen this type had already been used by Grimoald III.

Under Sico's son and successor, Sicard, the type with the archangel Michael on the reverse was no longer used. Gold coins, which were solidi and tremisses, were minted with the traditional type with the cross potent on steps on the reverse. This was the last gold coinage of the Lombard princes of Benevento. A new cruciform monogram with the letters SICARD was used in the deniers. Sicard was the last ruler of the Benevento principality in its unitary arrangement. Upon his death, a civil war began that resulted in the final separation of Salerno. A brief reunification occurred only in the last decades of the 10th century. The coins of his successors were only made of silver.

==== Coinage of Adelchis ====
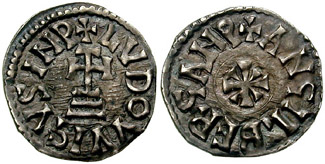
Adelchis: denier
+LVDOVVICVS INP, cross potent on steps	+ANGILBERGA NP, baptismal cross
AR denier (1,13 g), in the name of Louis II and Angilberga.

The coinage of Adelchis was distinctive, testifying to the political changes in the principality. In 860 Adelchis was defeated at Bari by Saracen forces; he then had to ask for help from the Frankish emperor Louis II, who defeated the Saracens in 866 and recaptured Bari in 871. Louis II then sought to reassert imperial control over the principality by quartering troops in the Benevento fortresses. Adelchis responded by taking the emperor prisoner while he was a guest in the princely palace at Benevento.

Adelchis' coinage is divided into four periods, each with various types. However, these were still deniers.

	Years	Known types
Adelchis alone	853-867	7
Adelchis and Louis	867-870	2
Louis or Louis with Engelberga	870-871	13
Adelchis and Pope John VIII	871	1

The first period of Adelchis' coinage (853-867) is the one bearing only the prince's name; there were seven types used. Of these, one on the obverse had in the field, on three lines, the legend + / ADEL' / PRIN and on the reverse a cross set aside by four lozenges and around it the legend - ARHANGEMIHAE (Archangel Michael), very similar to the reverse of Grimoald IV's deniers of fifty years earlier. Another one had the traditional cross on steps on the obverse with the legend ADELHIS PRINCE around it, while on the reverse, within the legend A - RHANGELVMICHAEL, there was a cross, potent in the horizontal shaft, and with seven globules on each arm of the vertical shaft. A third type had in the field the letters P ADL R (Prince Adelchi) arranged on three lines to form a cross, with the legend + SANCTA MARIA around it, while yet another one had the "Carolingian temple" already used in the tornesels by Louis the Pious.

After the reconquest of Bari Louis settled in Benevento. This situation is evidenced by the issues of the second period, those of the years 867-870, which saw deniers in the joint names of Adelchis and Louis II. Two types were used: the first had on the obverse the image of the ear already used by Grimoald IV and around it the legend + LVDOVICVSIMPE and on the reverse a cross of the Holy Spirit flanked by the letters M and H (for Michael) and the legend + ADELHIS PRINCES, with the last S mirrored; the other coin on the obverse had in the field the legend I | LVDO | VVICV | ^ P ^ and on the reverse the letters P ADL R (Prince Adelchis) arranged on three lines to form a cross while around it was the legend + ARHANGELMIHAEL.

In the third period deniers were issued in Louis' name alone or with his wife. These coins are dated to the years 870-871. Here the types used were mostly taken from earlier imperial coinage: the "Carolingian temple," the cross with the legend + XPSTIANARELIGI ("christiana religio") and others. In one group of coins the legends BENVENTV CIBI, BENEVENTUM or similar appear. In other coins appeared the name of Louis' wife, Engelberga, in the form of ANGILBERGA accompanied by titles such as DMA ("domina"), IMP ("imperatrix") or AGVSTA, with various spellings.

In the fourth period coins were minted in the joint names of Adelchis and Pope John VIII. From this period, dated in 871, only one type is known that has on the obverse the legend ADELGI around a cruciform monogram with the letters IOHA (Iohannes, the pope's name in Latin) and on the reverse, in the field, the legend SCAMR (Sancta Maria).

==== The last princes ====
Adelchis was assassinated in 878 following a plot that put his nephew Gaideris on the throne. Very few coin specimens are known of Gaideris and his successors, and not all attributions are certain. Cagiati cites for Gaideris a single specimen and also for Radelchis II and Aiulf II one specimen each.

In 899 Atenulf I, prince of Capua, conquered Benevento, united the two principalities, and de facto the principality of Benevento ended up having autonomous political importance.

=== Principality of Salerno ===
Princes of Salerno
in the period 840-900

1st dynasty
Siconids

- 840–851 Siconulf
- 851–853 Sico II

2nd dynasty

- 853 Peter
- 853–861 Adhemar

3rd dynasty
Dauferidi

- 861 Daufer
- 861–880 Guaifer
- 880–900 Guaimar I

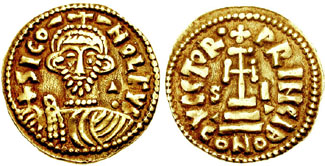
Siconulf: solidus
SICO--NOLFVS•, crowned bust in front, holding a globus cruciger globe; wedge in right field.	VICTOR• +PRINCI, cross potent on steps; on the sides S I; in exergue CONOB.
Electrum 3,73 g

In 839 Sicard of Benevento was assassinated in a conspiracy hatched by his treasurer and successor Radelchis. The people of Salerno then proclaimed Sicard's brother Siconulf as prince. The clash between the two pretenders lasted over ten years, and during this period Siconulf moved the capital of the Benevento principality to Salerno.

The Lombard coinage of the Salerno principality is divided into two phases: the first runs from about 840 to about 900 and the second from about 1050 to 1077. The attribution of coins to the princes of Salerno is often uncertain: Byzantine and Benevento coins also circulated in the area, as well as Arab coins from Sicily, such as dinar quarters or tarì with Kufic inscriptions.

Siconulf issued solidi and silver deniers. On the silver coins he retained the title of prince of Benevento as appears from the legends: PRINCE BENEBENTI.

After Siconulf the coinage was made exclusively of silver. The coins of his successors, with the exception of those of Guaifer (861-880), are extremely rare: they are often unique or known for only two or three specimens. The most common type bears a monogram on the obverse and a cross potent on steps on the reverse. The first phase of coinage ended under Guaifer's son Guaimar (880-901).

The second phase of coinage occurred under Prince Gisulf II. Follari, copper coins that were widespread in several centers of southern Italy, were minted. One type featured on the obverse the prince seated on a throne and on the reverse the panorama of the fortified city.

== Weights and alloys ==
=== Gold ===
The coins initially minted, before the spread of the denier, were the solidus, a gold coin, and the tremissis, also made of gold, equal to one-third of a solidus. The weight of the "Byzantine" solidus was about 4.55 grams and that of the tremissis about 1.52 grams.

According to Cagiati, the weight of Benevento solidi rarely reached 4 grams. The weight of solidi preserved in the British Museum in the period 706-806 is generally over 60 grains (about 3.87 g), reaching in some cases a maximum of 64 grains (about 4.15 g). In the later coinages, (817-851) it is usually less than 60 grains. The British Museum tremisses range in weight from 19 to 21 grains (about 1.23-1.35 grams).

The alloy used at Benevento in gold coinage varied considerably and was generally lower than that of the imperial mints. Cagiati reports data from a study published by Vincenzo Capobianchi, according to which the average title of the solidi was 0.762.

Sometimes electrum or some other alloy of gold was used. Analysis of the coins of Romuald II gives an alloy of 20 carats, those of Gregory range between 20 and 18 carats; with his successors the gold is at 18 carats. Under Arechis II (758-787) the alloy that was initially 18 carats becomes 13 and 1/3. With Grimoald III, who initiated the minting of silver, the gold alloy dropped further to 12 carats. With Sico there was also a further loss of weight, and under his successors the gold content also dropped to 10 carats. Eventually, under Adelchis, gold coins ceased to be minted and the only coins minted were silver deniers.

=== Silver ===
Beginning with Grimoald III, silver coins began to be minted, following the coinage spread in Italy by the Franks (Carolingian coinage). The weight of the British Museum specimens varies from 22-1 grains (about 1.43 g) of those of Grimoald III and gradually decreases to 19-9 of Siconulf (1.28 g), to 18-8 (1.21 g) of Radelchis I to drop under Adelchis, in some specimens, to 16-6 grains (1.07 g).

The alloy of these deniers is, however, of good quality.

== Legends and monetary epigraphy ==
Early coins bore legends that only roughly resembled the original ones: IYNIVNVS for "Iustinianus," VGЧS for AVGVSTI, DNI INVSPP for DN ("dominus") I [VSTIN IN]I[A]NVS ("Iustinianus").

The exergue bore the legend CONOB, written in various ways: CONO, ONO; sometimes the "B" was written mirrored, often larger than the other letters.

The names and words present have considerable variety in spelling: MICHΛЄL, MICHAEL, MIHAEL MICNACL, MIHCAEL, even a ΠICHVEL; BINIBENTI, BENEBENTI, BENEBEHTI or DENEDENTI, BENEBENTV; PRINPI, PRINCIP, PRINCE, PRINCES, PRINCEES.

Sometimes the "A" was written V, Δ, Λ, ∀ or ∇ and at other times it was rotated 90º. The letter "S" was sometimes written mirrored or on other occasions rotated 90º. The letter "G" was written as ʕ and sometimes resembled an "S."

The duke's name was indicated on the reverse with the initial in the field next to the cross. The title of DVX was indicated in some cases with a "D," sometimes written as "Δ." With Gisulf II the title was indicated by the monogram (DVX): in some cases to the left, in others to the right of the cross, and in others rotated. In Liutprand's early coins the cross was flanked by the letters "L" and "S," the latter indicating his mother Scauniperga as regent.

When, with Arechis II, the duchy became a principality the reverse highlighted the new title with the legend VITIR∀- PRINPI.

Of particular note are the coins of Grimoald III. The identifying letters of this prince are the "G" and "R" flanking the cross. The name is first written in extended form as GRIM VALD. In the first phase of Grimoald's coinage (788-792) coins bore on the obverse the legend GRIM VAL followed by the monogram DX ("dux") and on the reverse the legend DOMS CAR with the monogram ℞, ("rex"). Various monograms with the prince's name were used in the deniers. Many had the letters at the ends of a cross or arranged to form a cross themselves. The letter "Ω," which appeared in Grimoald's deniers after his break with Charlemagne, was written under the form "ω."

== See also ==
- Duchy of Benevento
- Langobardia Minor
- Lombards

== Bibliography ==
Lombard coinage

- Bernareggi, Ernesto (1983). Moneta Langobardorum. Milan: Cisalpino Goliardica.
- Memmo Cagiati (2003) [1917]. La zecca di Benevento. Milano: University of Michigan Library. ISBN 978-88-271-0957-1. (anastatic reprint.
- Enrico Catemario di Quadri, "Considerazioni sulle monete di Benevento" in Bollettino del Circolo numismatico Napoletano, 38 (1953), 3-7
- Philip Grierson; Mark Blackburn (2007). Medieval European Coinage. Vol. 1, The Early Middle Ages (5th–10th Centuries). Cambridge University Press.
- W. Andrew Oddy: Analysis of the gold coinage of Beneventum, Numismatic Chronicle, 19 (1974), 78-109
- Arthur Sambon, Recueil des monnaies de l'Italie méridionale. Bénévent, Le Musée, giugno 1908 (reprinted along with other works under the title Recueil des monnaies du sud de l'Italie avant le domination des Normands, Paris, 1919)
- Giulio Sambon, Repertorio generale delle monete coniate in Italia e da Italiani all'estero dal secolo V al XX. vol. I Periodo dal 476 al 1566. Paris 1912. (anastatic reprint: ISBN 978-88-271-1360-8)
- CNI (Corpus Nummorum Italicorum), vol. XVIII.

Catalogs

- Warwick William Wroth (1911). Catalogue of the coins of the Vandals, Ostrogoths and Lombards, and of the empires of Thessalonica, Nicaea and Trebizond in the British museum. London: Order of the Trustees.

Imperial coinage

- Alfred R. Bellinger. Catalogue of the Byzantine Coins in the Dumbarton Oaks Collection and in the Whittemore Collection. Vol. 2.
- Hahn, Wolfgang (1973–1981). Moneta Imperii Byzantini (MIB). Vol. 3. Vienna: Verlag der Österreichischen Akademie der Wissenschaften. ISBN 978-3-7001-0005-8.
- Pierre Justin Sabatier, Description générale des monnaies byzantines frappées sous les Empereurs d'Orient, in 2 voll., Paris, 1862

Dictionaries

- Belaubre, Jean (1996). Dictionaire de Numismatique médiévale occidentale. Paris: Léopard d'Or. ISBN 2-86377-121-3.
- Klütz, Konrad (2004). Münznamen und ihre Herkunft. Vienna: moneytrend Verlag. ISBN 3-9501620-3-8.
- Martinori, Edoardo (1915). La moneta - Vocabolario generale. Rome: Istituto italiano di numismatica.
