= Mappa (Roman) =

Cloth used to start chariot races

In Ancient Rome, a mappa was a white cloth or napkin used by the presiding magistrate (a consul, a praetor, or sometimes a dictator) to signal the start of a chariot race at a hippodrome by tossing it down into the arena. Its use is attested to beginning in the early years of the Roman Empire, though chariot races pre-date it by hundreds of years. Any piece of white cloth could serve as a mappa. Roman consuls were often depicted on coins holding a mappa in their raised right hand, and the mappa therefore became represented as an item of imperial regalia.

In the early Byzantine period of art history, following the fall of Rome and the Western Roman Empire, it becomes difficult to distinguish between a mappa and an akakia (a piece of cloth consisting of a roll of purple silk which held a small amount of symbolic dust). Prior to the reign of Justinian II in the 7th century CE all such ambiguous cloths were probably mappas, while following him they were consistently akakias. The mappa was an item of pagan regalia, and the akakia was a Christian replacement for it in a symbolic drift.
