= ASTM D8441/D8441M =

Standard defining a symbol for cannabis products

International Intoxicating Cannabinoid Product Symbol (ASTM D8441) for light and dark backgrounds

ASTM D8441 is an ASTM International standard defining the International Intoxicating Cannabinoid Product Symbol (IICPS). As of mid-2026, the symbol has been incorporated into the universal symbols required for cannabis packages in the states of Alabama, Delaware, Georgia, Minnesota, Montana, New Jersey, Oregon, South Dakota, Vermont, and Virginia. Adoption of ASTM D8441 has been proposed in other states, including Alaska, Arizona, Arkansas, Connecticut, Ohio, and Rhode Island.

== Development ==
The IICPS was co-designed by Doctors for Drug Policy Reform (D4DPR, previously Doctors for Cannabis Regulation) founder David L. Nathan and University of Pennsylvania design student Eli Nathan. David Nathan has published a number of proposed standards for cannabis product labeling, one of which, a cannabis product symbol, was renamed the IICPS in 2021.

Working together with D4DPR, Committee D37 of ASTM International approved the IICPS as the world's first and only cannabis product symbol to bear the designation of an international voluntary consensus standard. The standard was published as ASTM D8441/D8441M in February 2022.

== Definition ==
ASTM D8441/D8441M defines the IICPS as the silhouette of a cannabis leaf inside an ANSI Z535 and ISO 3864 compliant black-bordered yellow warning triangle. All dimensions of the symbol and the leaf silhouette (a novel design by David and Eli Nathan) are specified in ASTM D8441/D8441M. When used on a dark background, the IICPS utilizes a yellow border that is defined in ASTM D8441/D8441M but is not included in ISO 3864.

As required by ISO 3864 and ISO 7010, no text is permitted in the IICPS itself. However, the IICPS is designed to be accompanied by supplemental text if and when defined by the authority having jurisdiction (AHJ). For example, the Montana symbol includes the word “MARIJUANA” under the IICPS, the New Jersey symbol includes another graphic with a hand in a stop sign and the words “NOT SAFE FOR KIDS”, and the Vermont symbol includes the text “CONTAINS THC”.

== Usage ==
Montana was the first U.S. state to adopt the IICPS in late 2021. Numerous other states have subsequently incorporated the IICPS design into their state symbols. Oregon requires its use on all intoxicating hemp products.

New Jersey and Vermont have mandated the printing or embossing of the IICPS directly onto single servings of cannabis products — such as edibles. Virginia requires that vaporizer cartridges display the IICPS either "engraved, printed, or affixed with a sticker."

Through its designation as the "international symbol established by ASTM International," the IICPS is the only cannabis product symbol to have been included in a U.S. federal bill: the Cannabinoid Safety and Regulation Act (2024 Senate Bill S.5243).

== Accessing the IICPS and ASTM D8441/D8441M ==
While the standard ASTM D8441/D8441M is only available for purchase directly from ASTM International, the digital files for the IICPS itself are available at no cost via download on the D4DPR website, and there is no fee for its use by regulatory authorities as long as the symbol itself is not modified. States that have adopted the symbol have made it freely available for download on the websites of their respective cannabis regulatory authorities.
