= High Price (book) =

2013 book by Carl Hart

- Author: Carl Hart
- Subject: Recreational drug use, addiction, neuroscience, war on drugs
- Genre: Non-fiction
- Publisher: Penguin Press
- Publication date: 2013
- Pages: 352

High Price: A Neuroscientist's Journey of Self-Discovery That Challenges Everything You Know About Drugs and Society is a 2013 book by psychologist and neuroscientist Carl Hart, combining memoir, scientific assessment, and policy recommendation. Hart recounts his own experiences growing up in a poor African-American neighborhood in Miami, surrounded by violence and drug use, and views it through his research as a neuroscientist investigating the effects of drugs. He argues for an end to the punitive war on drugs that he finds to be based on race, class and misconceptions, in favor of evidence-based policies.

== Reception ==
Writing in the New York Times, John Tierney found High Price to be "a fascinating combination of memoir and social science: wrenching scenes of deprivation and violence accompanied by calm analysis of historical data and laboratory results." In Scientific American, Anna Kuchment recommended High Price, writing, "Hart's account of rising from the projects to the ivory tower is as poignant as his call to change the way society thinks about race, drugs and poverty." Publishers Weekly wrote, "Combining memoir, popular science, and public policy, Hart’s study lambasts current drug laws as draconian and repressive, arguing that they’re based more on assumptions about race and class than on a real understanding of the physiological and societal effects of drugs. ... His is a provocative clarion call for students of sociology and policy-makers alike."

High Price won the PEN/E. O. Wilson Literary Science Writing Award in 2014.
