= Carl Hart =

American neuroscientist (born 1966)

Dr. Carl Hart
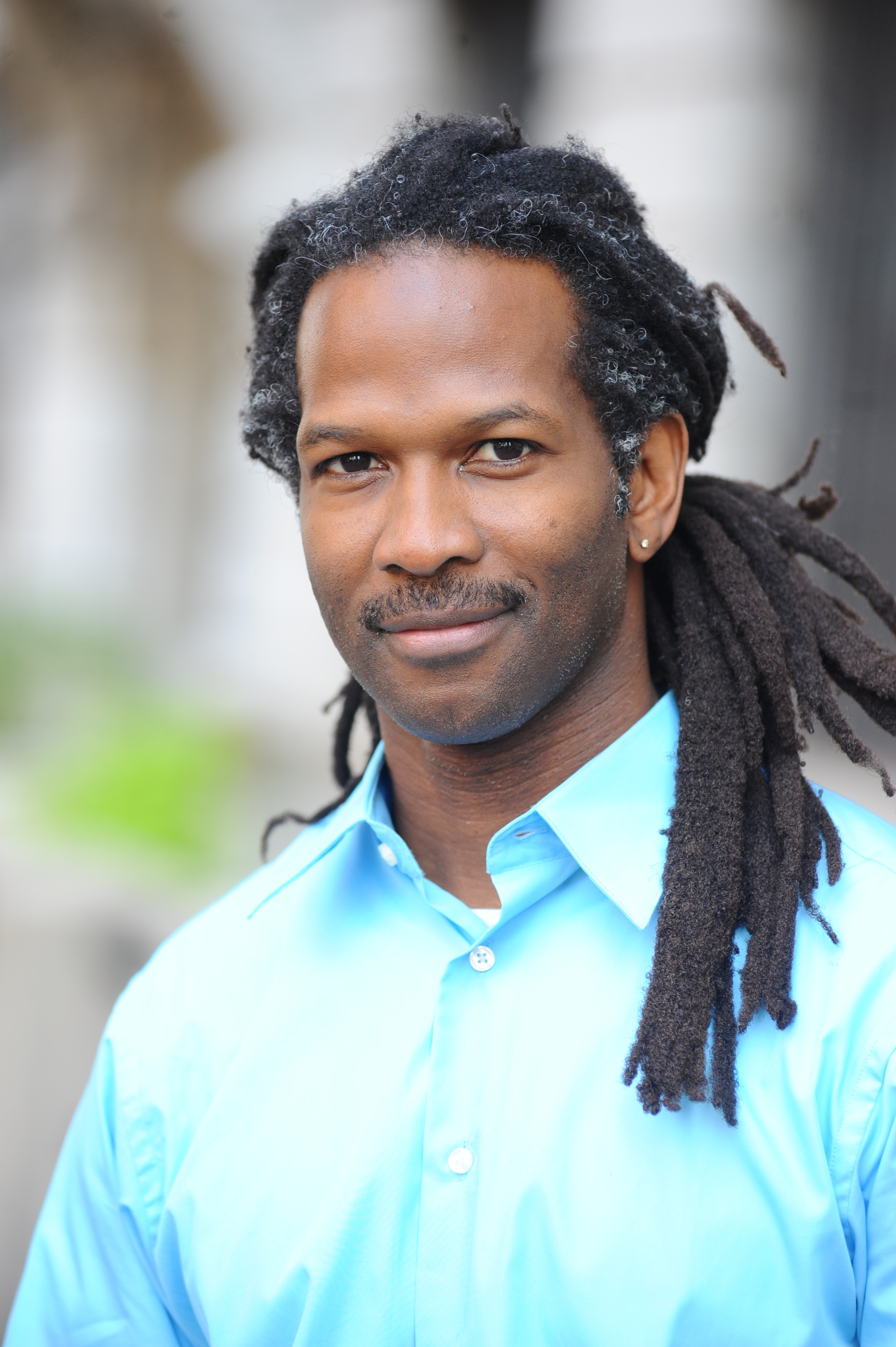
- Hart in 2012
- Born: October 30, 1966 (age 60); Miami, Florida, U.S.
- Education: University of Maryland, College Park (BS); University of Wyoming (MS, PhD)
- Known for: Research about recreational drug use, drug abuse/substance use, and addiction
- Spouse: Robin Hart
- Scientific career
- Fields: Neuroscience, psychology
- Workplaces: Columbia University; New York State Psychiatric Institute
- Thesis: Role of the L-type calcium channel in nicotine-induced locomotion in rats (1996)
- Doctoral advisor: Charlie Ksir

Carl L. Hart (born October 30, 1966) is an American psychologist and neuroscientist who is the Mamie Phipps Clark Professor of Psychology (in Psychiatry) at Columbia University. Hart is known for his research on drug abuse and drug addiction, his advocacy for the legalization of recreational drugs, and his recreational drug use. Hart became the second tenured African-American professor of sciences at Columbia University. He is the author of two books for the general public, High Price: A Neuroscientist's Journey of Self-Discovery that Challenges Everything You Know about Drugs and Society (2013) and Drug Use for Grown-Ups: Chasing Liberty in the Land of Fear (2021).

== Early life and education ==
Hart grew up in the Carol City neighborhood of Miami Gardens, a suburb of Miami considered one of the most dangerous in the U.S. As a youth, he engaged in petty crime and the use and sale of drugs, and at times carried a gun. He was also a proficient athlete involved in high school sports. He was raised by a single mother, who separated from an abusive father when Hart was six. After high school, he served in the United States Air Force from 1984 to 1988, which became his path to higher education.

Hart earned a Bachelor of Science degree in psychology from the University of Maryland and a Master of Science (1994) and PhD (1996), both in psychology/neuroscience, from the University of Wyoming. When he received his doctorate, he was the only black PhD in neuroscience in the U.S. Hart attended University of North Carolina Wilmington, where he worked with his undergraduate neuroscience professor, Robert Hakan, before attending the University of Wyoming. He pursued postdoctoral research at the University of California, San Francisco and Yale University, and completed an Intramural Training Award fellowship at the National Institutes of Health.

== Career and research ==
Hart is the Mamie Phipps Clark Professor of Psychology (in Psychiatry) and former chair of the psychology department at Columbia University. He arrived at Columbia in 1998; in 2009, he became the university's first tenured African-American professor of sciences. His area of expertise is neuropsychopharmacology, with a research focus on the behavioral and neuropharmacological effects of psychoactive drugs in humans. He has a particular interest in the social and psychological factors that influence self-administration of drugs. He is the Principal Investigator at Columbia University's Neuropsychopharmacology Lab.

In 1999, Hart began investigating the effects of crack cocaine on behavior. Through 2009, he received research grants totaling over $6 million from the National Institute on Drug Abuse.

Hart's research centers on human subject experiments conducted in his research lab at the New York State Psychiatric Institute (a hospital in the Columbia University Irving Medical Center). The facility, informally called the ResLab (residential laboratory), accommodates subjects for extended periods; a typical experiment runs for two weeks. The subjects, habitual drug users, are given precisely metered doses of drugs such as cannabis, cocaine, and methamphetamine, while being continuously monitored and tested.

Hart opposes the brain-disease model of addiction dominant in the field, which holds that addiction is a brain disorder. National Institute on Drug Abuse director Nora Volkow has said that visible differences in addicts' brains help explain the nature of compulsive drug usage. According to Hart, most studies show that drug users' cognitive abilities and functions are within the normal range. Stanford Addiction Medicine Dual Diagnosis Clinic head Anna Lembke has said, "intelligent, informed people can disagree on the disease model of addiction", and that there is evidence that long-term drug use can alter the brain in a different way than learning a new language or a musical instrument. Hart has said that an absence of other outlets and activities is one reason people use drugs. He argues that drug laws intended to make society safer should be based on empirical evidence.

Hart is also a Research Fellow and former co-director at Columbia's Institute for Research in African-American Studies.

== Books ==
Hart has written two books for the general public, High Price and Drug Use for Grown-Ups. He and Charles Ksir co-authored recent editions of the introductory textbook Drugs, Society, and Human Behavior.

=== High Price ===
In 2013, Hart published High Price: A Neuroscientist's Journey of Self-Discovery That Challenges Everything You Know About Drugs and Society, described as "combining memoir, popular science, and public policy." In it, he discusses misconceptions about illegal drugs, speaking from the combined perspectives of growing up in a poor, crime-ridden African-American neighborhood and his career as a research neuroscientist. He describes his upbringing, time in the military, years in college and grad school, and journey to a PhD and tenured professorship at Columbia. He discusses the challenge of learning white cultural norms and language as an aspect of succeeding in academia, and then returning to his family and feeling alienated and unable to connect. Using drug crime statistics and details from his lab research, he argues that drugs are a symptom, not a cause, of crime and poverty, and that they mask issues of lack of education, racism, unemployment, and despair. He ends the book with an argument for decriminalizing drugs, saying that his research has shown that the dangers associated with drugs are largely misunderstood, and that a decrease in stigma and increase in conversation would likely decrease drug-related deaths. He advocates drug policies based on scientific evidence and human rights, not irrational fear and sensationalism.

=== Drug Use for Grown-Ups ===
In 2021, Hart published Drug Use for Grown-Ups: Chasing Liberty in the Land of Fear. In it, he writes that, in his over 25-year research career, he has found that "most drug-use scenarios cause little or no harm and that some responsible drug-use scenarios are actually beneficial for human health and functioning." In the book and in interviews about it, Hart revealed that he is a recreational user of heroin and other drugs. He says he is not an addict, but uses drugs responsibly in "pursuit of happiness". Hart argues that recreational drug use is beneficial for most people, and that journalists and researchers overstate its harms.

== Public debate ==
Hart argues that drug policy in the U.S. and most of the rest of the world "is based on assumption and anecdote, but rarely on scientific evidence". He once advocated decriminalizing drug use through policies that are scientifically based rather than heavily influenced by social determinants such as race and class. Now he recommends legalizing drugs. He discusses the criminalization of crack cocaine (typically associated with poor communities) and lack of similar criminalization of powder cocaine (traditionally associated with wealthier communities) as an example of how drug criminalization has been based on social problems rather than scientific fact, since both contain the same active chemical.

Hart has said that the poor, crime-ridden environment he grew up in influenced his world view, and that he once believed drugs caused poverty and crime in most neighborhoods. Later, through his research, he came to believe that "crime and poverty were mostly independent of drug use".

Hart has lectured and testified around the world as an expert on psychoactive drugs. He testified before the United States Congress Committee On Oversight and Government Reform. He has testified, on the stand and in written submissions, in family courts in New York City, advocating for children to stay with parents who have tested positive for cannabis, arguing that there is no scientific evidence that cannabis use has a detrimental effect on parenting. In one case, a mother had tested positive while giving birth at a city hospital and been charged with negligence (the case was later dropped).

In a 2013 New York Times editorial, Hart commented on the toxicology report in the case of Trayvon Martin, where the indication of cannabis in Martin's blood was used as evidence that he might have been paranoid the night of his fatal shooting, causing him to attack his shooter. Hart said this argument relied on outdated notions of cannabis use, such as those in Reefer Madness, and failed to recognize the seven decades of research on cannabis that show the levels in Martin's blood were insufficient to cause paranoia, which is extremely uncommon in cannabis users.

At a 2017 drug policy conference at the University of the Philippines Diliman, Hart addressed misconceptions about methamphetamine in the Philippines during President Rodrigo Duterte's war on drugs. Citing lab tests on animals, Hart refuted Duterte's claim that methamphetamine shrinks people's brains and makes them violent. After his speech, Hart began to receive online death threats that forced him to quickly leave the Philippines. Duterte said of Hart's claims, "That's all bullshit to me" and called Hart a "son of a bitch who has gone crazy". In an interview with Public Radio International, Hart called Duterte "a president making such ignorant comments about drugs like he's a pharmacologist" and added that Duterte was "out of his league when he talks about drugs".

=== Media appearances ===
Hart has been a speaker at Talks at Google, The Reason Foundation, and The Nobel Conference. He has been interviewed or otherwise featured on CNN, Stossel, "The Independents" on Fox Business, "All In with Chris Hayes" on MSNBC, Reason TV, "The O'Reilly Factor" on Fox News, "Democracy Now!", and The Joe Rogan Experience. He spoke at TEDMED 2014, discussing his evidence-based view of drug addiction and how it should influence public policy. Hart appears in the 2012 documentary The House I Live In and in the 2021 Netflix documentary Crack: Cocaine, Corruption & Conspiracy, in which he discusses what was missing from the sensationalized portrayal of crack in the 1980s.

== Personal life ==
Hart is married to Robin Hart and has three children. He lives in New York City.

== Awards and honors ==
- Columbia University: Presidential Award for Outstanding Teaching (2008)
- Mothers Against Teen Violence: Humanitarian Award (2014)
- PEN/E. O. Wilson Literary Science Writing Award for High Price: A Neuroscientist's Journey of Self-Discovery That Challenges Everything You Know About Drugs and Society (2014)
- City of Miami: Dr. Carl Hart Day (Feb 1, 2016)

== Bibliography ==
Selected articles, essays and research papers:

- Hart, C.; Van Gorp, W.; Haney, M.; Foltin, R. W.; Fischman, M. W. (2001). "Effects of Acute Smoked Marijuana on Complex Cognitive Performance". Neuropsychopharmacology. 25 (5): 757–765. doi:10.1016/S0893-133X(01)00273-1. PMID 11682259. S2CID 817333.
- Haney, Margaret; Hart, Carl L.; Vosburg, Suzanne K.; Nasser, Jennifer; Bennett, Andrew; Zubaran, Carlos; Foltin, Richard W. (2004). "Marijuana Withdrawal in Humans: Effects of Oral THC or Divalproex". Neuropsychopharmacology. 29 (1): 158–170. doi:10.1038/sj.npp.1300310. PMID 14560320. S2CID 17918963.
- Hart, Carl; Lynch, Wendy (2005). "Developing Pharmacotherapies for Cannabis and Cocaine Use Disorders". Current Neuropharmacology. 3 (2): 95–114. doi:10.2174/1570159053586726.
- Haney, Margaret; Hart, Carl L.; Vosburg, Suzanne K.; Comer, Sandra D.; Reed, Stephanie Collins; Foltin, Richard W. (2008). "Effects of THC and lofexidine in a human laboratory model of marijuana withdrawal and relapse". Psychopharmacology. 197 (1): 157–168. doi:10.1007/s00213-007-1020-8. PMC 3372576. PMID 18161012.
- Hart, Carl L.; Marvin, Caroline B.; Silver, Rae; Smith, Edward E. (2012). "Is Cognitive Functioning Impaired in Methamphetamine Users? A Critical Review". Neuropsychopharmacology. 37 (3): 586–608. doi:10.1038/npp.2011.276. PMC 3260986. PMID 22089317.
- Rowell, Tawandra L.; Wu, Elwin; Hart, Carl L.; Haile, Rahwa; El-Bassel, Nabila (2012). "Predictors of Drug Use in Prison among Incarcerated Black Men". American Journal of Drug and Alcohol Abuse. 38 (6): 593–597. doi:10.3109/00952990.2012.694536. PMC 3582218. PMID 22746253.
- Ksir, Charles; Hart, Carl L. (2016). "Cannabis and Psychosis: A Critical Overview of the Relationship". Current Psychiatry Reports. 18 (2): 12. doi:10.1007/s11920-015-0657-y. PMID 26781550. S2CID 36538598.
- Frazer, Kirsten M.; Manly, Jennifer J.; Downey, Geraldine; Hart, Carl L. (2018). "Assessing cognitive functioning in individuals with cocaine use disorder". Journal of Clinical and Experimental Neuropsychology. 40 (6): 619–632. doi:10.1080/13803395.2017.1403569. PMID 29226762. S2CID 45203356.
- Hart, Carl; Grifell, Marc (2018). "Is Drug Addiction a Brain Disease?". American Scientist. 106 (3): 160. doi:10.1511/2018.106.3.160.
- Hart, Carl L.; Hart, Malakai Z. (2019). "Opioid crisis: Another mechanism used to perpetuate American racism". Cultural Diversity & Ethnic Minority Psychology. 25 (1): 6–11. doi:10.1037/cdp0000260. PMID 30714762. S2CID 73431609.
- Hart, Carl L. (2020). "Exaggerating Harmful Drug Effects on the Brain is Killing Black People". Neuron. 107 (2): 215–218. doi:10.1016/j.neuron.2020.06.019. PMC 7328574. PMID 32615067.
