= Lombard coinage =

Currency

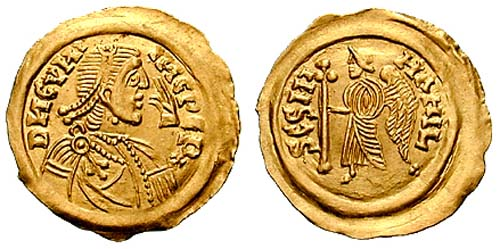
A tremissis of Cunipert (r. 688-700), issued by the mint of Pavia. Obverse: DN CVNI-INCPE RX, diademed, draped and cuirassed bust right; in field to right, manus Dei Reverse: SCS MI-HAHIL :., St. Michael standing left, holding long cross.

The coinage of the Lombards refers to the autonomous productions of coins by the Lombards. It constitutes part of the coinage produced by Germanic peoples occupying the former territory of the Roman Empire during the Migration Period. All known Lombard coinage was produced after their settlement of Italy. The coinage originates from two distinct areas, in Langobardia Major between the last decades of the sixth century and 774, and in Langobardia Minor, in the duchy of Benevento, between approximately 680 and the end of the 9th century.

The earliest Lombard coins imitated contemporary Byzantine coinage, and coinage under the names of the Lombard kings was a later development. In the north the coinage consisted almost exclusively of tremisses, while solidi were also minted in Benevento. The southern coinage of Benevento and Salerno, although distinguished from that of the north by various stylistic and typological characteristics, also took inspiration from Byzantine models until new types bearing regal titles were issued by Cunipert towards the end of the 7th century.

After Lombard rule was superseded by that of the Franks in 774, Lombard-style coinage was produced for some time afterwards. In Langobardia Minor, the coinage was continued for around a hundred years.

While the coinage is largely in gold, silver coinage appears under the influence of the Franks in the end of the 8th century, alongside tremisses and solidi. Silver becomes the more prevalent metal only for the latest coinages, of the 9th century.

== Catalogues and sources ==
=== Lombard coinage ===
For the coinage minted by the Lombards, the most recent reference work is the first volume of Medieval European Coinage, by Philip Grierson and Mark Blackburn. In the catalogues one therefore often finds a reference of type "MEC 1, 274", where MEC indicates the initials of this work, 1, the first volume, and 274, the index number of the coin in MEC. Coins of Lombard mints are catalogued between 274 and 331 in the first volume of MEC. The illustrations show coins of the collection of the Fitzwilliam Museum, Cambridge.

A slightly more recent study, but more specialised, is that of Ernesto Bernareggi, published in Milan in 1983, under the title Montea Langobardorum. In particular, it collects the various studies of the same author published since 1960. Reference to this work is made by "Bernareggi", followed by the index number. Other catalogues in common use include the "BMC Vand", which covers the coinage of the Vandals and other migration periods groups present in the British Museum, in 1911.

An important collection of Lombard coinages is found in the civic collections of Milan, at the Sforza Castle, and a catalogue of this collection was published in 1978 by Ermanno Arslan. This work is generally referenced as "Arslan", followed by the index number.

Less commonly used internationally, but equally relevant, is CNI (Corpus Nummorum Italicorum), which illustrates the collection of Victor Emmanuel III of Italy. Lombard coins are covered by volumes IV (Pavia and other minor mints of Lombardy), V (Milan) and XI (Tuscany).

=== Byzantine coinage ===
The first coins issued by the Lombards were imitations of those coined in the Eastern Roman Empire; the models used were those of Maurice (582-602), Heraclius (610-641) and Constans II (641-668).

There are various recent catalogues which covers these issues; most important are the catalogue of the collection of Dumbarton Oaks, abbreviated DOC, and Moneta Imperii Byzantini by Wolfgang Hahn, abbreviated as MIB. Maurice's coinage is catalogued in the first volume of DOC, and the second volume of MIB; the issues of Heraclius and Constans II are in the second volume of DOC and the third of MIB.

== Finds and hoards ==
Only five hoards have been found which contain non-pseudo-imperial coinage of the Lombards. Of these, only two have been published in any detail.

- A hoard found at Ossi, Sardinia was described by Vincenzo Dessì in 1908.
- A hoard found at Ilanz, Grisons was described by Fritz Jecklin in 1906, and was further studied by Bernareggi in 1977.

We know little of the other hoards:

- A hoard of Landriano included tremisses of Ratchis and Aistulf.
- That of Mezzomerico contained between fifty and a hundred tremisses of Desiderius.
- The treasure of Biella included various silver coins and 28 tremisses of Liutprand. While the composition of the hoard is known, the exact provenance and mode of discovery are not.

There also was a hoard found at Lucca in 1840, which included, beyond many local coins, a few of Aistulf and Desiderius, but the coins were dispersed immediately, and there is little reliable information regarding the location or circumstances of the discovery or the exact composition.

== Bibliography ==
=== Primary sources ===
- (LA) Paul the Deacon, Historia Langobardorum, in Georg Waitz (editor), Monumenta Germaniae Historica, Hanover, 1878, Scriptores rerum Langobardicarum et Italicarum saec. VI–IX, 12–219.
- (LA) Leges Langobardorum, in Friedrich Bluhme (editor), Monumenta Germaniae Historica, Hanover, 1868, Vol. IV.

=== Lombard coinage ===
- Ernesto Bernareggi, Moneta Langobardorum, Milan, Cisalpino Goliardica, 1983.
- CNI (Corpus Nummorum Italicorum), vol. IV, V and XI.
- Enrico Catemario di Quadri, "Considerazioni sulle monete di Benevento" in Bollettino del Circolo Numismatico Napoletano, 38 (1953), 3-7
- Giulio Cordèro di San Quintino, "Discorsi sopra la zecca e le monete di Lucca", in Memorie e documenti per servire alla storia di Lucca, Lucca, Accademia lucchese di scienze, lettere ed arti, 1860 (online version)
- Giuseppe Gavazzi, "Congetture sull’attribuzione di alcuni tremissi longobardi", in Rivista italiana di numismatica, Milano, 1890
- Domenico Massagli, "Introduzione alla storia della zecca e delle monete lucchesi", Lucca, 1870. (reprinted by Cassa di Risparmio di Lucca, 1976)
- Giulio Sambon, Repertorio generale delle monete coniate in Italia e da Italiani all'estero dal secolo V al XX. vol. I Periodo dal 476 al 1566. Paris, 1912. (reprinted as ISBN 978-88-271-1360-8)

=== Catalogues ===
- Philip Grierson, Mark Blackburn Medieval European Coinage (MEC) - Volume 1, The Early Middle Ages (5th–10th Centuries), Cambridge University Press, 2007, ISBN 978-0-521-03177-6 (Lombard coinage is covered in pages 55 to 66 and covered in plates 15 and 16)
- Ermanno Arslan, Le monete di Ostrogoti, Longobardi e Vandali. Catalogo delle Civiche Raccolte Numismatiche di Milano, Milano, Comune di Milano, 1978.
- Warwick William Wroth: Catalogue of the coins of the Vandals, Ostrogoths and Lombards, and of the empires of Thessalonica, Nicaea and Trebizond in the British museum, Londra, 1911. (cited as "BMC Vand"; Lombard coinage is covered in pages lv-lx and 123-154, and illustrated in plates XVIII-XX, online version available)

=== Byzantine coinage ===
- Alfred Bellinger, Catalogue of the Byzantine Coins in the Dumbarton Oaks Collection and in the Whittemore Collection: Vol. 1, Anastasius I to Maurice, 491-602, cited as "DOC" (Dumbarton Oaks Collection), 5 volumes in 9 books.
- Wolfgang Hahn, Moneta Imperii Byzantini (MIB), Vienna, Verlag der Österreichischen Akademie der Wissenschaften, 1973-1981, ISBN 978-3-7001-0005-8.
- Pierre Justin Sabatier, Description générale des monnaies byzantines frappées sous les Empereurs d'Orient, in 2 vols., Paris, 1862

== See also ==
- History of coins in Italy
