= Drug Use for Grown-Ups =

2021 book by Carl Hart

- Book cover
- Author: Carl Hart
- Subject: Recreational drug use, addiction
- Genre: Non-fiction
- Publisher: Penguin Press
- Pages: 304

Drug Use for Grown-Ups: Chasing Liberty in the Land of Fear is a 2021 book by Columbia University professor Carl Hart. In part a memoir that discusses Hart's own experiences as a heroin user, the book analyzes the science of addiction and advocates recreational drug use as part of the "pursuit of happiness". Hart asserts that “recreational drugs can be used safely to enhance many vital human activities” and bases the claims in his book on decades of research on the behavioral and physiological effects of drugs in humans.

== Reception ==
Drug Use for Grown-Ups received mixed reviews upon its release. Nicholas Cannariato wrote a generally favorable review for NPR that focused on Hart's civil libertarianism and focus on institutional racism. Casey Schwartz writing for the New York Times stated, "when it comes to the legacy of this country’s war on drugs, we should all share his outrage."

The Los Angeles Review of Books gave the book a mixed review, supporting Hart's conclusions on drug liberalization and yet opposing his "cherry picking" of evidence: "[It] is good drug policy based on bad rhetoric." City Journal similarly argued that Hart ignores evidence in the book, instead focusing primarily on "personal anecdote". Michael Shellenberger intensely criticized Hart's work in his 2021 book San Fransicko.
