= Duchy of Benevento =

Vassal of the Kingdom of the Lombards in present-day southern Italy from 577 to 774

Duchy of Benevento Ducatus Beneventi (Latin)
- 577–774
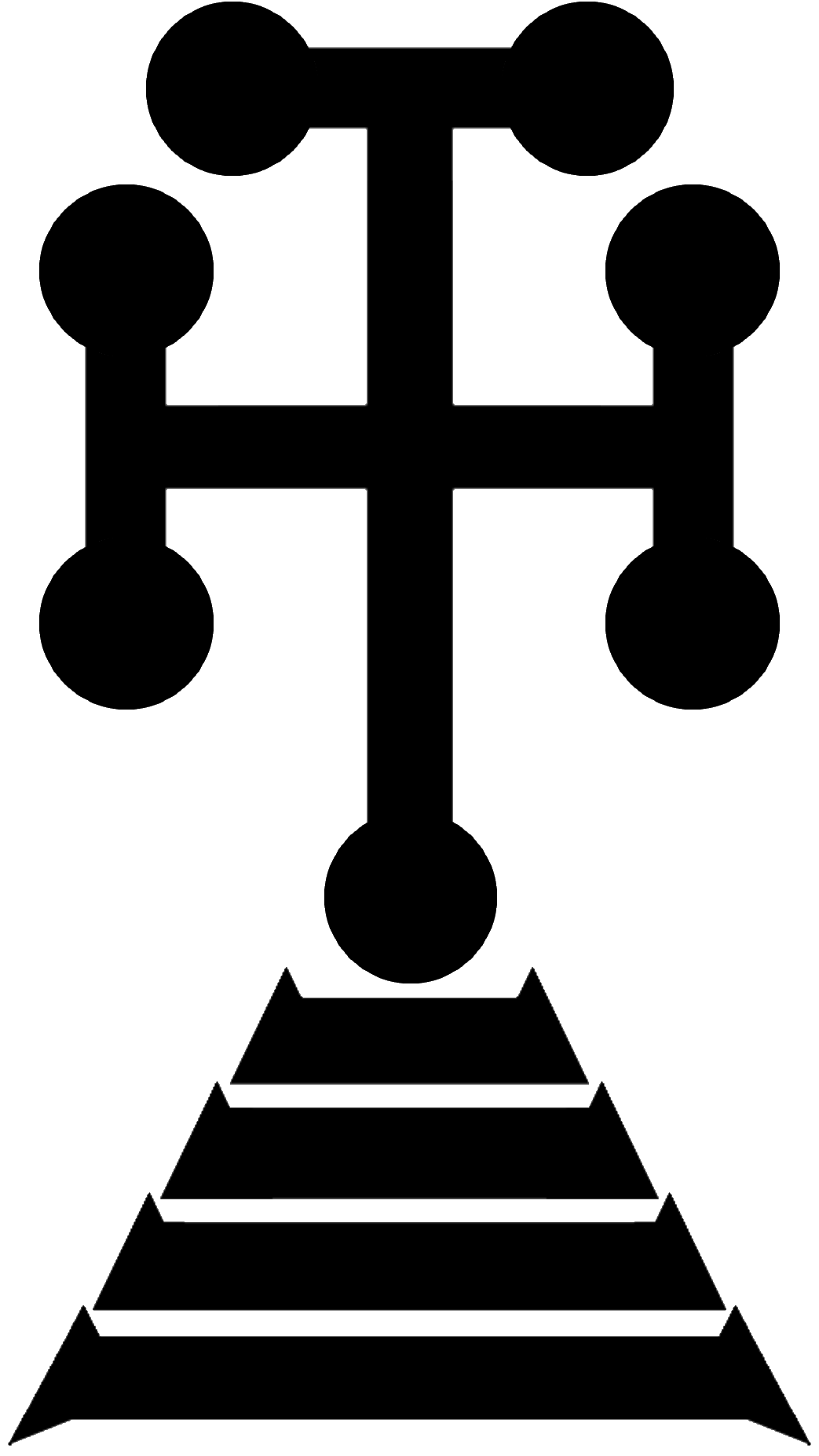
- Calvary cross potent motif was commonly minted on coins by various princes

- Lombard Duchy of Benevento in the eighth century
- Status: Vassal state of the Kingdom of the Lombards
- Capital: Benevento
- Common languages: Vulgar Latin; Lombardic (Until VII century)
- Religion: Chalcedonian Christianity (official), Arianism (former)
- Government: Monarchy
- Duke
  - 571–591: Zotto (first duke)
  - 758–774: Arechis II (last duke & first prince)
- History
  - Established: 577
  - Frankish conquest of the Kingdom of the Lombards: 774
  - Disestablished: 774
- Currency: Solidus, tremissis, denarius
Preceded by	Succeeded by
Byzantine Empire; Kingdom of the Lombards	Principality of Benevento; Theme of Longobardia
- Today part of: Italy

The Duchy of Benevento was the southernmost Lombard duchy in the Italian Peninsula that was centered in Benevento, a city in Southern Italy. Lombard dukes ruled Benevento from 571 to 774, when the Kingdom of the Lombards was conquered by the Kingdom of the Franks. Being cut off from the rest of the Lombard possessions by the papal Duchy of Rome, Benevento always had held some degree of independence. Only during the reigns of Grimoald (r. 662–671) and the kings from Liutprand (r. 712–744) on was the duchy closely tied to the Kingdom of the Lombards. After the fall of the kingdom in 774, the duchy became the sole Lombard territory which continued to exist as a rump state, maintaining its de facto independence for nearly 300 years as the Principality of Benevento.

Paul the Deacon referred to Benevento as the "Samnite Duchy" (Ducatum Samnitium) after the region of Samnium.

== Foundation ==
The circumstances surrounding the creation of the duchy are disputed. According to some scholars, Lombards were present in southern Italy well before the complete conquest of the Po Valley: the duchy by these accounts would have been founded in 571. The Lombards may have entered later, around 590. Whatever the case, the first duke was Zotto, a leader of a band of soldiers who descended the coast of Campania. Though at first independent, Zotto was eventually made to submit to the royal authority of the north. His successor was Arechis, his nephew, and the principle of hereditary succession guided the Beneventan duchy to the end.

The Lombard duchies, part of the loosely-knit Lombard kingdom, were essentially independent, in spite of their common roots and language, and law and religion similar to that of the north, and in spite of the Beneventan dukes' custom of taking to wife women from the royal family. A swathe of territory that owed allegiance to Rome or to Ravenna separated the dukes of Benevento from the kings at Pavia. Cultural autonomy followed naturally: a distinctive liturgical chant, the Beneventan chant, developed in the church of Benevento: it was not entirely superseded by Gregorian chant until the 11th century. A unique Beneventan script was also developed for writing Latin. The 8th-century writer Paul the Deacon arrived in Benevento in the retinue of a princess from Pavia, the duke's bride. Settled into the greatest of Beneventan monasteries, Monte Cassino, he wrote first a history of Rome and then a history of the Lombards, the main source for the history of the duchy to that time as well.

== Expansion ==
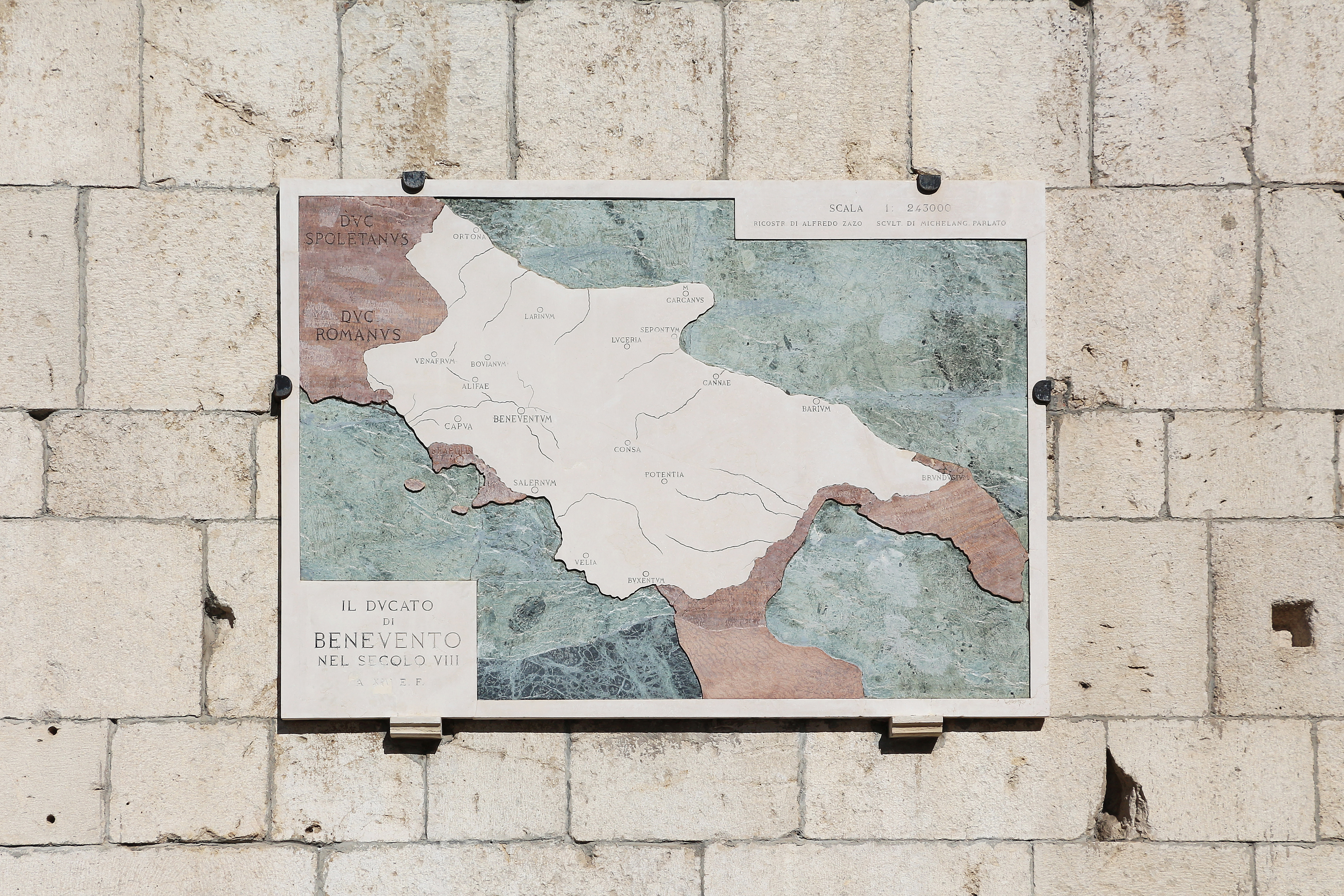
Map of Duchy of Benevento on the church tower of Santa Sofia

Under Zotto's successors, the duchy was expanded against the Byzantine Empire. Arechis, himself from the duchy of Friuli, captured Capua and Crotone, and sacked Byzantine Amalfi, but was unable to capture Naples. After his reign, Byzantine holdings in southern Italy were reduced to Naples, Amalfi, Gaeta, Sorrento, Calabria, and the maritime cities of Apulia (Bari, Brindisi, Otranto, etc.). In 662, Duke Grimoald I (duke since 647), went north to aid the King Godepert against his brother, the co-king Perctarit, and instead killed the former, forced the latter into exile, and captured Pavia. As king of the Lombards, he tried to reinstate Arianism over the Catholicism of the late king Aripert I. However, Arianism was disappearing even in the duchy, as was the distinction between the ethnic Lombard population and the Latin- and Greek-speaking one. In 663, the city itself was besieged by the Byzantines during the failed attempt of Constans II, who had disembarked at Taranto, to recover southern Italy. Duke Romuald I defended the city bravely, however, and the Emperor, also fearing the arrival of Romuald's father, King Grimoald, retired to Naples. However, Romuald intercepted part of the Roman army at Forino, between Avellino and Salerno, and destroyed it. A peace between the Duchy and the Eastern Empire was signed in 680.

In the following decades, Benevento conquered some territories from the Byzantines, but the main enemy of the duchy was now the northern Lombard kingdom itself. King Liutprand intervened several times to impose a candidate of his own on the ducal throne. His successor, Ratchis, declared the duchies of Spoleto and Benevento foreign countries where it was forbidden to travel without royal permission.

== Secundum Ticinum ==
In 758, king Desiderius briefly captured Spoleto and Benevento, but with Charlemagne's conquest of the Lombard kingdom in 774, Arechis II tried to claim the royal dignity and make Benevento a secundum Ticinum: a second Pavia (the old Lombard capital). Seeing that this was impractical and would draw Frankish attention to himself, he opted instead for the title of princeps (prince). In 787, he was forced by Charlemagne's siege of Salerno to submit to Frankish suzerainty.
