= David C. Lewis (physician) =

American physician (1935–2020)

David C. Lewis (May 19, 1935 – December 2, 2020) was Professor Emeritus of Medicine and Community Health and the Donald G. Millar Distinguished Professor of Alcohol and Addiction Studies at Brown University.

He was Chairman of the Board of Directors of the United States' National Council on Alcoholism and Drug Dependence. He served on the Executive Committee and was former Executive Director of the Association for Medical Education and Research in Substance Abuse, and was the founder and a member of the Board of Directors of Physicians and Lawyers for National Drug Policy.

== Background ==
Lewis earned his bachelor's degree magna cum laude from Brown University in 1957 and his medical degree at Harvard University in 1961. He specialized in internal medicine and later in treatment of alcoholism and addiction to other drugs.

He entered the field of addictions while an internal medicine resident at Boston's Beth Israel Hospital, where he collaborated with famed Harvard psychiatrist Norman Zinberg on seminal work on heroin addiction (Zinberg & Lewis, 1964; Lewis & Zinberg, 1964). He later served from 1963-1964 as a health policy advisor to Cleveland mayor Dennis Kucinich and became a leading advocate for legalization of heroin maintenance programs (Lewis, 1964). From 1972 through 1979 he directed the Washingtonian Center for Addictions. He became Associate Clinical Professor of Medicine at Harvard Medical School in 1975. In 1976 he joined the Brown University faculty as an Associate Professor of Medicine and director of the Program in Alcoholism and Drug Abuse. He was named the Donald G. Millar Distinguished Scholar in Alcoholism Studies at Brown University in 1979 and chaired the Department of Community Health from 1981 through 1986. In 1982, he founded the Brown University Center for Alcohol and Addiction Studies and was designated the Donald G. Millar Distinguished Professor of Alcohol and Addiction Studies as well as Professor of Medicine and Community Health. He directed the alcohol studies center for 18 years prior to his retirement. From 1990 through 1991 he was Scholar-in-Residence in the National Academy of Sciences-Institute of Medicine in Washington, DC.

In 1976, Lewis was one of the founders of the Association for Medical Education and Research in Substance Abuse (AMERSA). He served as President of AMERSA from 1983 through 1985 and became Executive Editor of AMERSA's peer-reviewed, quarterly journal Substance Abuse in 1984. From 1986 through 1995 he was director of AMERSA's National Office, which was located at Brown University.

Lewis and David Duncan, in a presentation at the 1996 annual meeting of the American Public Health Association, proposed that an alliance of health professionals could best bring about major reform of America's national drug policies. In 1997, he convened a meeting of 37 of the nation's leading physicians which adopted a policy statement declaring the "war on drugs" to be a failed approach and calling for adoption of an approach to drug abuse based on prevention and treatment rather than law enforcement. The group of physician leaders incorporated as Physician Leadership on National Drug Policy (PLNDP), with Lewis as its Project Director from 1997 through 2003. In 2004, the organization expanded its membership to include a number of leaders of the legal profession and became Physicians and Lawyers for National Drug Policy. Dr. Lewis continued to serve on PLNDP's Board of Directors. Lewis has been a leading spokesperson for harm reduction (Lewis, Duncan & Clifford, 1997) and for the perspective that sees addiction as being a chronic disease like any other (Lewis, 1994; McLellan, Lewis, O'Brien, & Kleber, 2000).

In 1996 Lewis delivered the Norman E. Zinberg Memorial Lecture at Cambridge Hospital/Harvard Medical School. He received the American Medical Association's Education and Research Foundation Award in 1997 for outstanding contributions and leadership in championing the inclusion of alcohol and other drug problems into the mainstream of medical practice and medical education. He received the Distinguished Contributions in the Addictions award from Harvard Medical School in 2002, and in 2004 he received the John P. McGovern Award and Lectureship from the American Society of Addiction Medicine for his contributions to the treatment of addictive disorders.

Despite the fame, Lewis still loved teaching the best. He died on December 2, 2020, aged 85.
