= American Journal of Drug and Alcohol Abuse =

- Discipline: Addiction medicine
- Language: English

Publication details
- History: 1974–present
- Publisher: Taylor & Francis
- Frequency: Bimonthly

Standard abbreviations
- ISO 4: Am. J. Drug Alcohol Abuse

Indexing
- ISSN: 0095-2990 (print); 1097-9891 (web)

The American Journal of Drug and Alcohol Abuse is a bimonthly peer-reviewed medical journal covering all aspects of addiction. It was established in 1974 and is published by Taylor & Francis.

The editor-in-chief is Bryon Adinoff (University of Texas Southwestern Medical Center). According to the Journal Citation Reports, the journal has a 2020 impact factor of 2.925. AJDAA is an ISAJE (International Society of Addiction Journal Editors) member journal.

It is an international journal published six times per year and provides an important and stimulating venue for the exchange of ideas between the researchers working in diverse areas, including public policy, epidemiology, neurobiology, and the treatment of addictive disorders. AJDAA includes a wide range of translational research, covering preclinical and clinical aspects of the field. AJDAA covers these topics with focused data presentations and authoritative reviews of timely developments in our field. Manuscripts exploring addictions other than substance use disorders are encouraged. Reviews and Perspectives of emerging fields are given priority consideration.
