= Akakia =

Cylindrical roll of purple silk

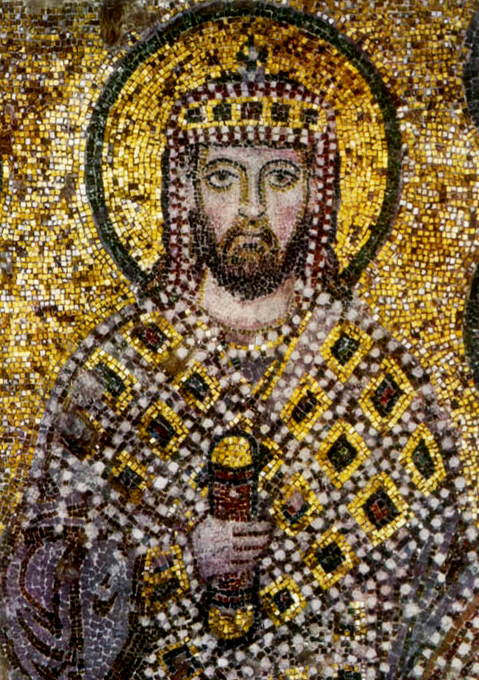
Byzantine Emperor Alexander, holding the akakia in his right hand. Mosaic from the Hagia Sophia.

The akakia (/əˈkækiə/, Greek: ἀκακία, literally or "not-wickedness". a- "not" or "against", kakia "wickedness"), previously known as an anexikakia ("enduring wickedness", "forgiveness", "forbearance", "patience") was a cylindrical purple silk roll containing dust which is depicted in wall mosaics and on coinage as being held by Byzantine emperors during ceremonies. It symbolized the mortal nature of all men. It possibly developed from the mappa, the cloth used by the Roman consuls to start the races at the hippodrome.

== Sources ==
- Kazhdan, Alexander, ed. (1991), Oxford Dictionary of Byzantium, Oxford University Press, p. 42, ISBN 978-0-19-504652-6
