= Chris Beyrer =

American physician and academic

Chris Beyrer is an American physician who is the Director of the Duke Global Health Institute. He was previously a professor of epidemiology at the Johns Hopkins Bloomberg School of Public Health in Baltimore, Maryland, in the United States. He was president of the International AIDS Society from 2014 to 2016.

== Early life ==
Beyrer was born in Bern, Switzerland, the son of Charles Beyrer, an American medical student. The family later moved to East Islip, New York, where Beyrer went to school. In 1981 he graduated in history from Hobart and William Smith Colleges in Geneva, New York. He spent time in Asia learning about Buddhism.

He graduated in medicine from the State University of New York Downstate Medical Center in Brooklyn, New York, in 1988, and completed a Master of Public Health degree at Johns Hopkins in 1991. From 1992 to 1997 he was in Thailand, where he worked on AIDS prevention. He returned to Johns Hopkins in 1997.

== Career ==
At Johns Hopkins, Beyrer is a professor of epidemiology, of international health and of health, behavior and society. He is director of the Hopkins Fogarty AIDS International Training and Research Program, and of the Center for Public Health and Human Rights, which he founded. He is an investigator for the Center for AIDS Research and an associate director of the Center for Global Health.

Beyrer was elected to the Institute of Medicine of the U.S. National Academy of Sciences in 2014.
