= Cross potent =

Heraldic cross

Cross potent

A cross potent (plural: crosses potent), also known as a crutch cross, is a form of heraldic cross with crossbars at the four ends. In French, it is known as croix potencée, in German as a Krückenkreuz, all translating to "crutch cross".

== Name ==
Potent is an old word for a crutch, from a late Middle English alteration of Old French potence "crutch". (Note: from Latin potentia 'power', which in medieval Latin meant 'crutch'. du Cange; et al. (1883). "potentia 2". Glossarium mediae et infimae latinitatis, éd. augm. Niort: L. Favre. t. 6, col. 437a, s.v. "Scipio, fulcrum subalare, nostris vulgo Potence." See also Oxford English Dictionary, 1st. edition, entry "Potent (sb.¹ and a.²)".) The term potent is also used in heraldic terminology to describe a T-shaped alteration of vair, and potenté is a line of partition contorted into a series of 'T' shapes.

In heraldic literature of the 19th century, the cross potent is also known as the "Jerusalem cross" due to its occurrence in the attributed coat of arms of the Kingdom of Jerusalem. This convention is reflected in Unicode, where the character ☩ (U+2629) is named CROSS OF JERUSALEM. The name Jerusalem cross is more commonly given to the more complex symbol consisting of a large Greek cross or cross potent surrounded by four smaller Greek crosses.

== History ==
The "cross potent" shape is found in pottery decorations in both the European and the Chinese Neolithic. In Chinese bronze inscriptions, the glyph ancestral to the modern Chinese character 巫 "shaman, witch" has the shape of a cross potent, interpreted as representing a cross-like "divining rod" or similar device used in shamanistic practice, with a possible connection to the Iranian magi.{{efn|text=Tu Baikui 塗白奎 (quoted by Boileau 2002:354) believes the wu oracle character "was composed of two pieces of jade and originally designated a tool of divination." Citing Li Xiaoding 李孝定 that gong 工 originally pictured a "carpenter's square", Allan (1991:77) argues that oracle inscriptions used wu 巫 interchangeably with fang 方 "square; side; place" for sacrifices to the sifang 四方 "four directions".

A theory by Victor H. Mair connects the Chinese word (Old Chinese *myag, pinyin wū, Cantonese mou^{4} ) to Persian maguš. See:

- Victor H. Mair, “Old Sinitic *Myag, Old Persian Maguš and English Magician”, Early China 15 (1990): 27–47;
- Victor H. Mair, “The Earliest Identifiable Written Chinese Character”, Archaeology and Language: Indo-European Studies Presented to James P. Mallory, eds. Martin E. Huld, Karlene Jones-Bley & Dean Miller (Washington, D.C.: Institute for the Study of Man, 2012), 265–279;
- Mair, Victor H. (June 8, 2015). "Polysyllabic characters revisited". Language Log.

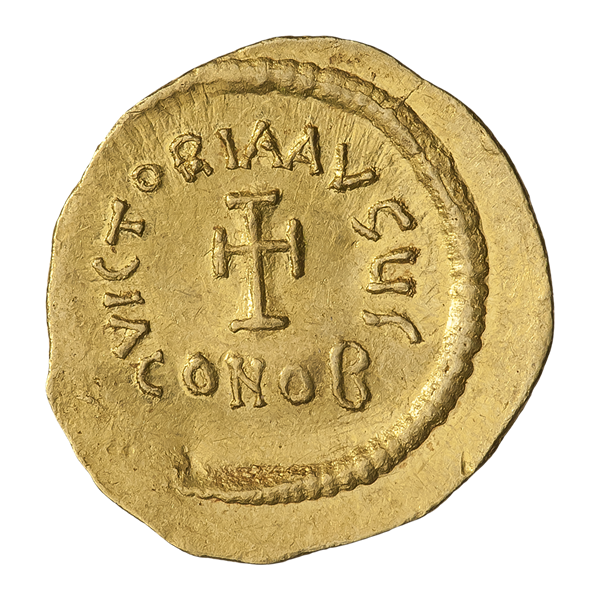
Tremissis of Heraclius (c. 610–613)

The cross potent as a Christian cross variant is used on Byzantine coins of the 7th century, under the Heraclian dynasty, mostly as a "Calvary cross potent", i.e. a cross potent standing on a number of steps. A Tremissis of Heraclius, dated c. 610–613, also shows the cross potent without the steps. A cross potent, or cross patty, is already shown on a Tremissis of Theodosius II (first half of the 5th century).

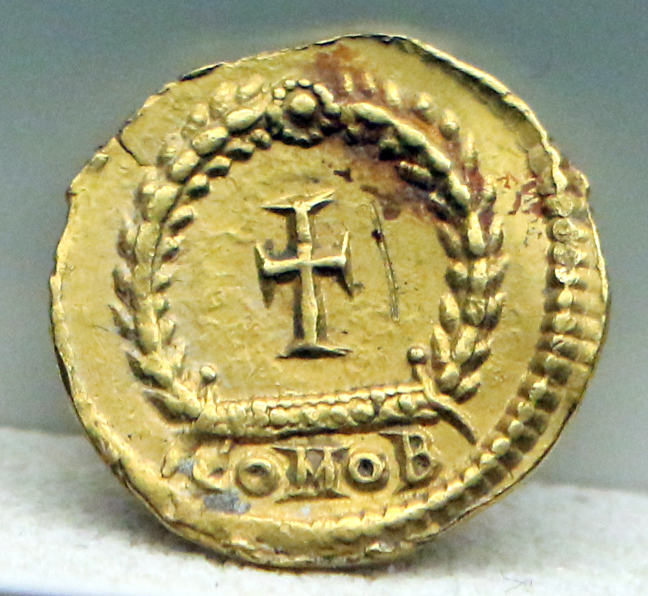
Tremissis minted under Theodosius II (r. 402–450)

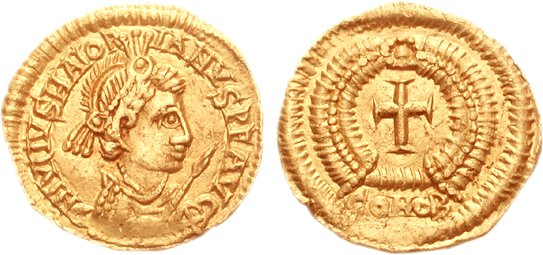
Visigothic tremissis (5th century)

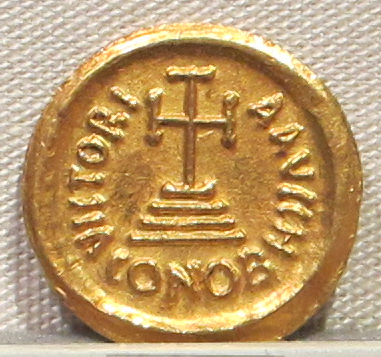
Calvary cross potent minted under Heraclius (c. 613–638)

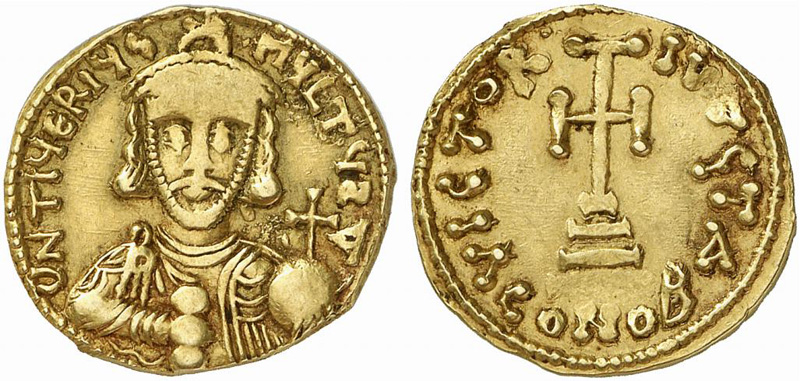
Calvary cross potent on a solidus minted under Tiberius Petasius (c. 730)

Early heraldic crosses are drawn to the edges of the shield, as ordinaries, but variations in the termination of the cross limbs become current by the later 13th century. The heraldic cross potent is found in armorials of the late 13th century, notably in the coat of arms of the Kingdom of Jerusalem, argent, a cross potent between four plain crosslets or (Camden Roll, c. 1280). Use of the cross potent remains rare in heraldry outside of the Jerusalem cross. In medieval heraldry, as in medieval seals, the distinction between the cross potent and the cross patty may be unclear. For example, the cross patty of the Teutonic Order is drawn as a cross patent for Tannhäuser in Codex Manesse (c. 1310).

Use of the Jerusalem cross is associated with the title of King of Jerusalem which passed from the kings of Cyprus to a number of royal houses of Europe in the late medieval period, notably the kings of Naples and the House of Savoy, via Louis II of Naples to the House of Lorraine, via conquest of Naples to the House of Aragon, and via Francis I to the Habsburg Emperors of Austria. A simple cross potent is used as the arms of northern Calabria (Calabria Citra) as a province of the Kingdom of Naples in the early modern period (Ferdinand, Duke of Calabria).

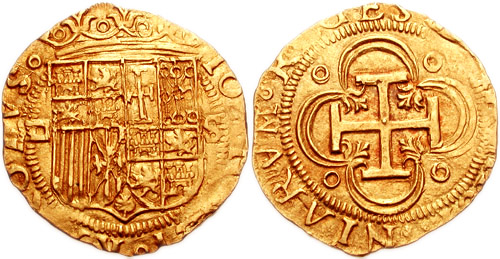
Cross potent on an escudo minted under Charles V (r. 1519–1556)

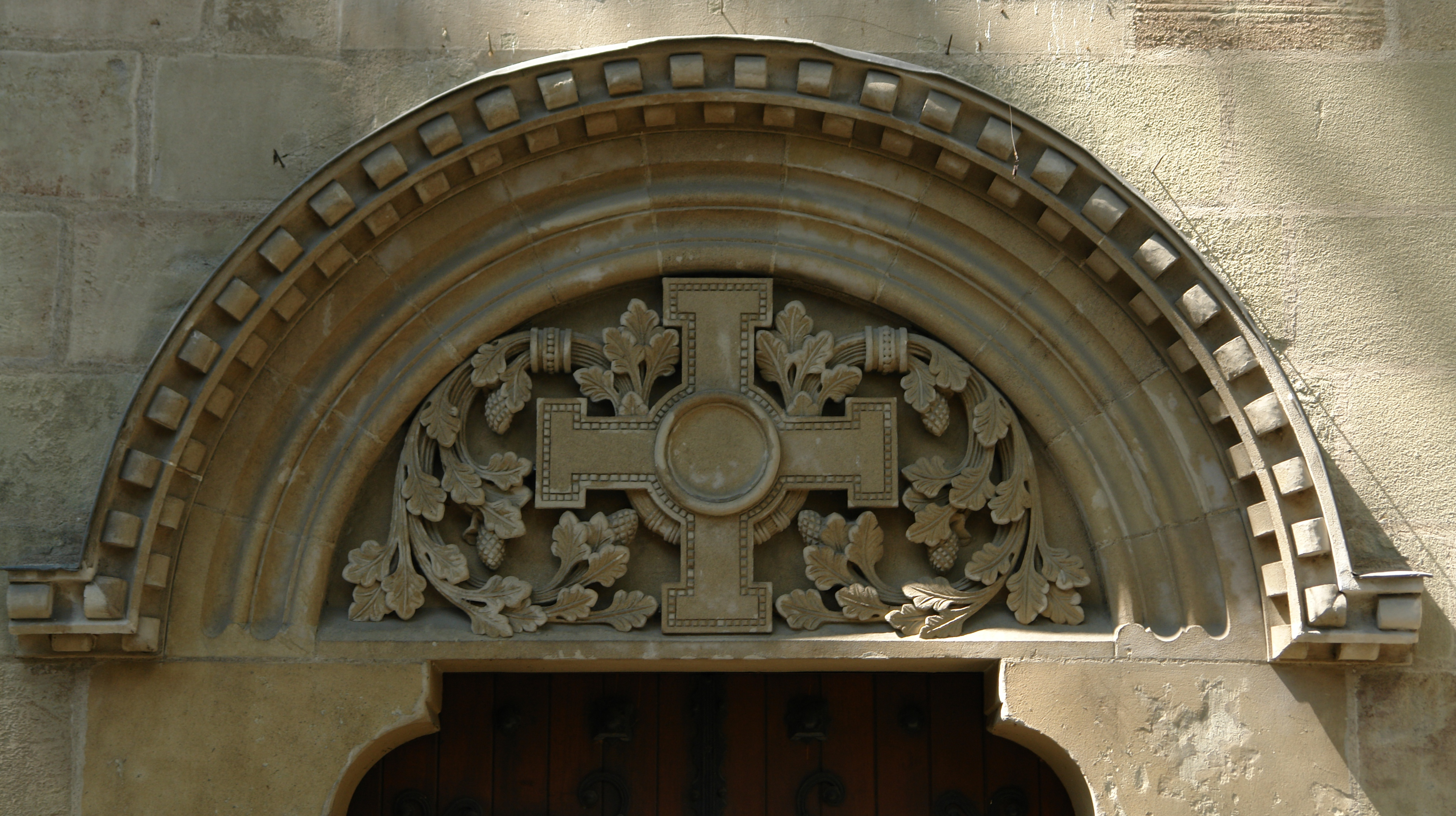
rinceau cross potent at a side entrance of St. Pierre Cathedral (18th century)

Use of the cross potent in heraldry is revived in the 19th to early 20th century, and then as an emblem for Roman Catholicism directly based on the Jerusalem cross.

== Modern use ==
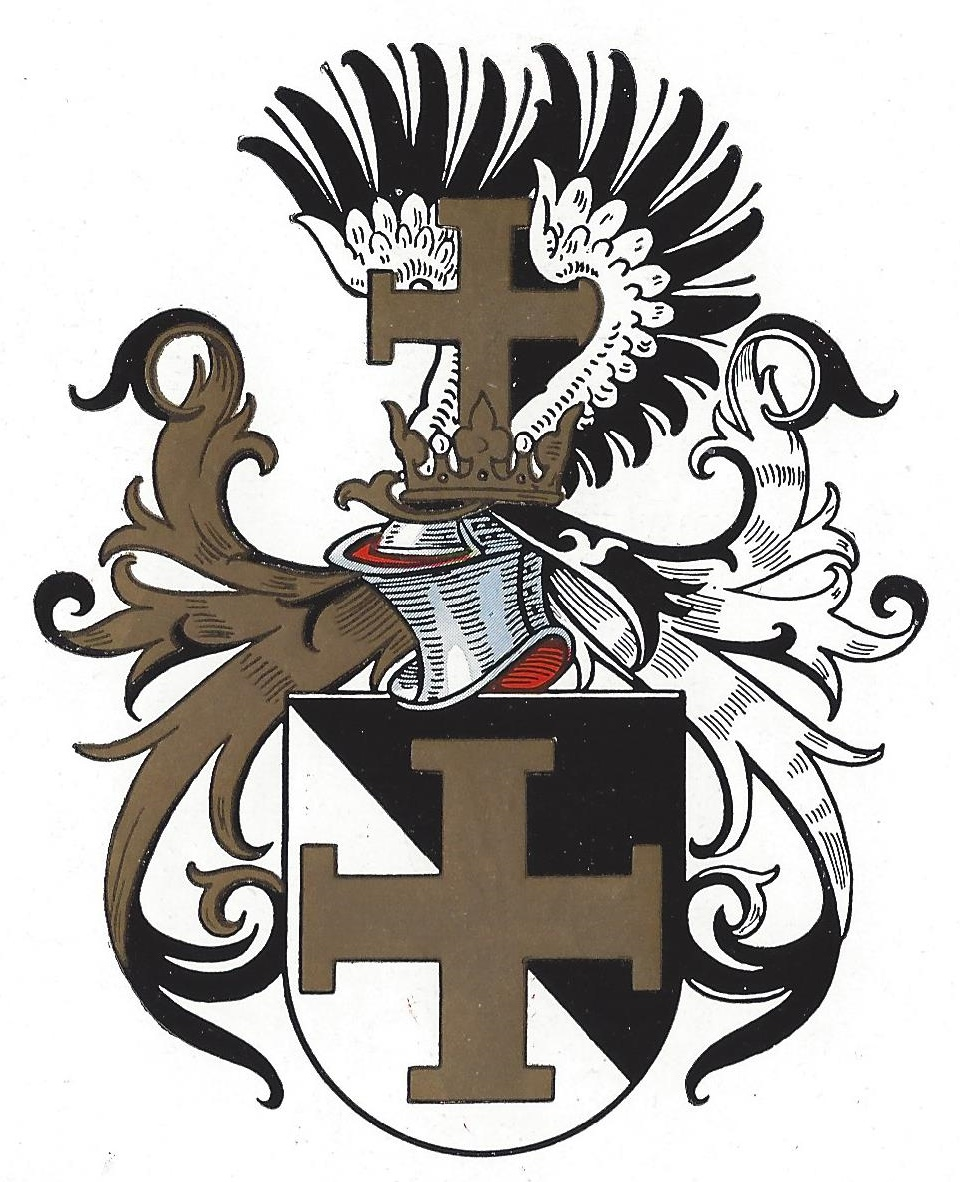
Use of the cross potent as a charge in modern heraldry: Coat of arms of the Wingolf Christian student fraternity (1931)

Upon the passage of the 1924 Schilling Act the cross potent was used as a national symbol of the Austrian First Republic, minted on the back of the Groschen coins. In 1934 it became the emblem of the Federal State of Austria, adopted from the ruling Fatherland's Front, the Catholic authoritarian traditionalist organisation led by Chancellor Engelbert Dollfuss. A reference to the Jerusalem Cross, it served as a counter-symbol to both the Nazi swastika and the communist hammer and sickle, as the Fatherland Front was both anti-Nazi and anti-Communist. The symbol was also adopted by the Russian far-right People's National Party and the obscure Cambodian militia MONATIO in the 1970s. It was also used as a symbol for independence by the Nationalist Party of Puerto Rico during the first half of the 20th century, an organization was a Roman Catholic movement that was traditionalist, anti-communist, anti-American and anti-imperialist and sought to liberate the archipelago of Puerto Rico from American control through armed struggle.

In the 1930s in the United States, George W. Christians, who founded the Crusader White Shirts in Chattanooga, Tennessee, posed for photographs with a form of crusader's cross or cross potent on a white shirt and a gun in his belt.

Today, the cross potent is used by many, mostly Roman Catholic, Scouting and Guiding organisations in their logos and insignia. It is currently used in the coats of arms of the Santa Cruz Department in Bolivia, and of the Wingolf Christian student fraternities in Germany, Austria and Estonia.

A white cross potent on a black background was a candidate in the 2015 Hello Internet Podcast Flag Referendum.

== See also ==
- Fylfot
- Jerusalem cross

== Sources ==
- Fox-Davies, Arthur Charles; Johnston, Graham (2004) [1909]. A Complete Guide to Heraldry. Kessinger Publishing. ISBN 1-4179-0630-8.
