= Siege of Salerno (871–872) =

Aghlabid campaign in Sicily

- Part of the history of Islam in southern Italy
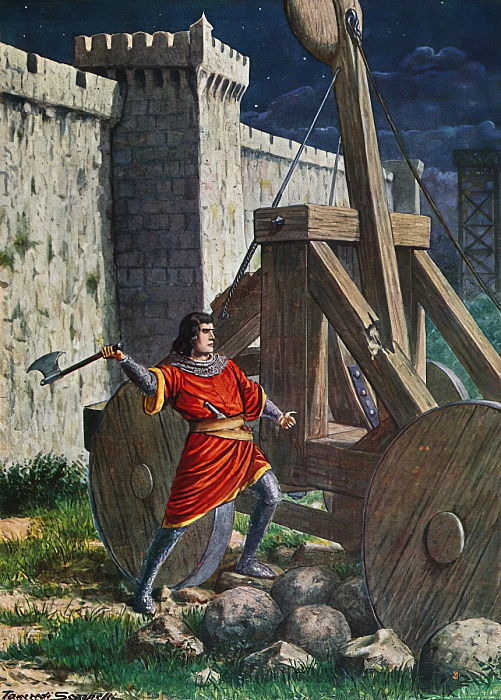
- Landemarius destroying the siege machine, from a 20th-century illustrated history of Italy. The machine depicted, however, is not a traction trebuchet.
Date	871/2–872/3
Location	Salerno
Result	Franco-Lombard victory

Belligerents
Aghlabid Emirate	Frankish Empire; Principality of Salerno; Principality of Benevento; County of Capua; Duchy of Naples

Commanders and leaders
ʿAbd Allāh ibn Yaʿqūb (executed) ʿAbd al-Malik (surrendered)	Prince Guaifer of Salerno; Emperor Louis II; Count Cuntart †

The siege of Salerno was one of the campaigns of the Aghlabids in southern Italy during their conquest of Sicily. The Lombard city of Salerno had strong defences and, despite the use of stone-throwing artillery, the siege lasted a little over a year from its beginning in late 871 or early 872. Prince Guaifer of Salerno led the defence, but the siege was only lifted by the arrival of an army of Lombards and Franks under the Emperor Louis II.

== Background ==
Louis II, King of the Lombards and Emperor of the Romans, fought a five-year campaign against the Emirate of Bari, which fell in February 871. In August, Louis was betrayed and imprisoned by Prince Adelchis of Benevento. He was freed a month later on the condition that he not return. He was in northern Italy when the Aghlabid army invaded southern Italy a few months later. On 17 May 872, in Rome, he obtained from Pope Adrian II the nullification of his oath to Adelchis. He then placed the prince under the ban of the Empire.

The conquest of Calabria and assault on Salerno, the most important city in Campania, was the Aghlabid response to the fall of Bari. The Aghlabid emir Muḥammad II appointed one ʿAbd Allāh as wālī (governor) of al-Arḍ al-Kabīra (the Big Land, i.e., the Italian Peninsula). At the same time, ʿAbd Allāh's brother Ribbāh was appointed wālī of Sicily, since the previous wālī, Muḥammad ibn Khafāja, had died early in 871. Abd Allāh and Ribbāh were the sons of Yaʿqūb ibn Fazāra and relatives of al-ʿAbbās ibn al-Faḍl, who was the governor of Sicily from 851 to 861, known for encouraging settlement in Calabria and Apulia.

== Sources ==
The main Latin sources are the contemporary historians Erchempert and Andreas of Bergamo and the Chronicon Salernitanum, written about 980. The Vita et translatio sancti Athanasii neapolitani episcopi, a biography of the bishop of Naples, is a source for the embassy that preceded the attack.

Among Arabic accounts, the Bayān of Ibn ʿIdhārī writes suggestively of ʿAbd Allāh's victories, but does not describe the end of the campaign. The Tarʾīkh Jazīrat Ṣiqilliya, on the other hand, describes the Arabs' defeat, putting it in the Byzantine year 6380, corresponding to 871–872.

The Greek De administrando imperio gives a wholly "mythical" and "apocryphal" account of the siege of Salerno.

== Advanced warning and preparations ==
The Salernitans had advanced knowledge of the attack, which allowed them to make preparations and gather allies. According to the account in the Chronicon Salernitanum, forewarning of the attack came from an Amalfitan merchant, who had been entrusted with the message while staying Ifrīqiya by an Arab who had been the recipient of Prince Guaifer's generosity. On a previous visit to Salerno, this Arab had complimented the prince on his cap while the latter was passing through the forum on his way to the palace from the public baths, whereupon the prince gave the Arab his cap. If any credence can be given to this story, Guaifer's exchange with the Arab must have taken place in the spring of 871, shortly after fall of Bari.

In preparation for the siege, the city's defences were strengthened and the garrison reinforced. Troops came from the Lombard principalities of Benevento and Capua. Guaifer dispatched an embassy to northern Italy to ask the Emperor Louis II for aid. The importance attached to this embassy can be gauged from the prestige of the envoys: Guaifer's son and heir, the future Prince Guaimar I; Bishop Landulf II of Capua; Bishop Athanasius II of Naples; and representatives from Pope Adrian II. This embassy took place between September and November 871. Louis initially rejected its entreaties and even imprisoned Guaimar for a time. Even Adelchis may have sought help from Louis—if the theory linking the composition of the poem De captivitate Ludovici imperatoris with the siege of Salerno is correct.

== Campaign ==
The Aghlabid force under ʿAbd Allāh crossed from Ifrīqiya, landed in Calabria and marched overland to Salerno, according to the Chronicon Salernitanum. Andreas of Bergamo, on the other hand, has them landing at Taranto. The Chronicon Salernitanum pegs the force at 72,000. Erchempert puts it at 30,000. Both numbers are exaggerations, but they do indicate that the Aghlabid army was considered very large. During its march north, it captured "many towns", in the words of Erchempert. It forced the Frankish army that was besieging Taranto, where the last remnants of the emirate of Bari were holding out, to abandon the siege.

In late fall or early winter, possibly as late as early 872, it laid siege to Salerno, which was too well defended to be taken by force. The countryside was ravaged to prevent food supplies from reaching the capital; its inhabitants either captured or slaughtered. The countryside of Benevento and Capua, defended by Adelchis, was not spared.

Deploying siege engines, the Aghlabids maintained a tight investment. In one of the earliest appearances of the word, the Chronicon Salernitanum calls these engines petraria. They were probably the traction trebuchets with which both sides would have been familiar. One particularly large one was used to slowly reduce a tower along the wall. According to the Chronicon Salernitanum, a certain Landemarius went over the walls and single-handedly destroyed it with an axe, killing many enemies in the process. In January 872, ʿAbd Allāh died and was replaced as commander by ʿAbd al-Malik.

On several occasions, the starving Salernitans considered surrendering. They were eventually reduced to eating cats and mice. After several months, Amalfi smuggled supplies to the defenders. According to the Chronicon Salernitanum, this move was much debated in Amalfi, because "from the first it had made peace with the Hagarenes". After over a year of pleas and entreaties, Louis II, then at Rome, sent a Frankish army reinforced by Lombard contingents to relieve the siege. The Frankish force defeated an Aghlabid force near Capua on the banks of the Volturno, while a Lombard force defeated a separate detachment at Suessula. According to Andreas of Bergamo, there were 20,000 Saracens at Capua. The Frankish commander, Louis's nephew Cuntart, was killed in action. Following this, Louis II himself came south. At his approach, the Aghlabids abandoned the siege. According to the Chronicon Salernitanum, in the final week of the siege the Frankish army had marched using branches as camouflage and the besiegers had exclaimed "it is like a mountain comes against us".

== Legacy ==
Following their defeat, the main part of the Aghlabid army sailed directly to Sicily before returning to Ifrīqiya. Some bands, however, retreated to Calabria and others remained behind in Campania. The siege of Salerno "represented the high point of Aghlabid involvement on the mainland". Following his victory, Louis II remained at Capua for a year trying to restore his authority in the south of Italy.

Unlike the campaign against Bari, the defence of Salerno saw no Byzantine involvement. Shortly after the lifting of the siege, a Byzantine fleet captured Otranto from the Arabs of the former emirate of Bari. Still at odds with Louis, Adelchis took the opportunity to put himself under Byzantine protection in exchange for the payment of tribute.

In the view of the Chronicon Salernitanum, the Aghlabids were God's avenging agents, sent to punish the Lombards for their betrayal of Louis II. Only after the Lombards had proved themselves faithful Christians and paid the penance of a siege, did God spare them. The chronicler compares the Salernitans to the ancient Israelites.

There are coins minted at Salerno with the month dates MENSE OCTUBR and MENSE AUGUSTU that were once associated with the siege of 871–872. Month dates are common on obsidional coins, but the style of the coins better fits the 11th century. They probably belong to the siege of 1076.

The account of the siege of Salerno in the Chronicon Salernitanum may be the historical source for an episode in Li coronemenz Looïs, a 12th-century Old French chanson de geste. In the chanson, Guillaume d'Orange saves Rome from a Saracen siege by defeating a Saracen in single combat. The Chronicon Salernitanum reports two incidents of single combat during the siege.

== Bibliography ==
- Amari, Michele (1854). Storia dei Musulmani di Sicilia. Vol. 1. Felice Le Monnier.
- Berto, Luigi Andrea (2014). "The Muslims as Others in the Chronicles of Early Medieval Southern Lombardy". Viator. 45 (3): 1–24. doi:10.1484/J.VIATOR.5.102918.
- Bondioli, Lorenzo M. (2018). "Islamic Bari between the Aghlabids and the Two Empires". In Glaire D. Anderson; Corisande Fenwick; Mariam Rosser-Owen (eds.). The Aghlabids and Their Neighbors: Art and Material Culture in Ninth-Century North Africa. Brill. pp. 470–490.
- Chevedden, Paul (1998). "The Hybrid Trebuchet: The Halfway Step to the Counterweight Trebuchet". In Donald J. Kagay; Theresa M. Vann (eds.). On the Social Origins of Medieval Institutions: Essays in Honor of Joseph O'Callaghan. Brill. pp. 179–222.
- Dvornik, F.; Jenkins, R. J. H.; Lewis, B.; Moravscik, G.; Obolensky, D.; Runciman, S. (2012) [1967]. Constantine Porphyrogenitus, De Administrando Imperio: A Commentary. Dumbarton Oaks.
- Gay, Jules (1904). L'Italie méridionale et l'empire byzantin depuis l'avènement de Basile I^{er} jusqu'à la prise de Bari par les Normands (867–1071). Albert Fontemoing.
- Granier, Thomas (2007). "La captivité de l'empereur Louis II à Bénévent (13 août–17 septembre 871) dans les sources des IX^{e}–X^{e} siècles: l'écriture de l'histoire, de la fausse nouvelle au récit exemplaire". Faire l'événement au Moyen Âge. Presses universitaires de Provence. pp. 13–39. doi:10.4000/books.pup.5703. ISBN 9782853996723.
- Grierson, Philip (1956). "The Salernitan Coinage of Gisulf II (1052-77) and Robert Guiscard (1077–85)". Papers of the British School at Rome. 24: 37–59. doi:10.1017/S0068246200006784. S2CID 163044784.
- Jeanroy, Alfred (1896). "Études sur le cycle de Guillaume au court nez: Le couronnement de Louis". Romania. 25 (99): 353–380. doi:10.3406/roma.1896.5456.
- Kreutz, Barbara (1996). Before the Normans: Southern Italy in the Ninth and Tenth Centuries. University of Pennsylvania Press.
- Metcalfe, Alex (2009). The Muslims of Medieval Italy. Edinburgh University Press.
- Musca, Giosuè (1964). L'emirato di Bari, 847–871. Edizioni Dedalo.
- Purton, Peter Fraser (2009). A History of the Early Medieval Siege, c. 450–1220. Boydell Press.
