= Longobardia =

Historical region of Italy

Theme of Longobardia Λογγοβαρδία, θέμα Λογγοβαρδίας
- Theme of the Byzantine Empire
- c. 891–965
- Map of Byzantine themes in Italy (yellow) c. 1000.
- Capital: Bari
- Historical era: Middle Ages
  - Byzantine conquest of Bari: 876
  - Establishment as a theme: c. 891
  - Establishment of the Catepanate of Italy: 965
Preceded by	Succeeded by
Exarchate of Ravenna; Duchy of Benevento	Catepanate of Italy
- Today part of: Italy

Longobardia (Greek: Λογγοβαρδία, also variously Λογγιβαρδία, Longibardia and Λαγουβαρδία, Lagoubardia) was a Byzantine term for the territories controlled by the Lombards in the Italian Peninsula. In the ninth and tenth centuries, it was also the name of a Byzantine military-civilian province (or thema) known as the Theme of Longobardia located in southeastern Italy.

== History ==
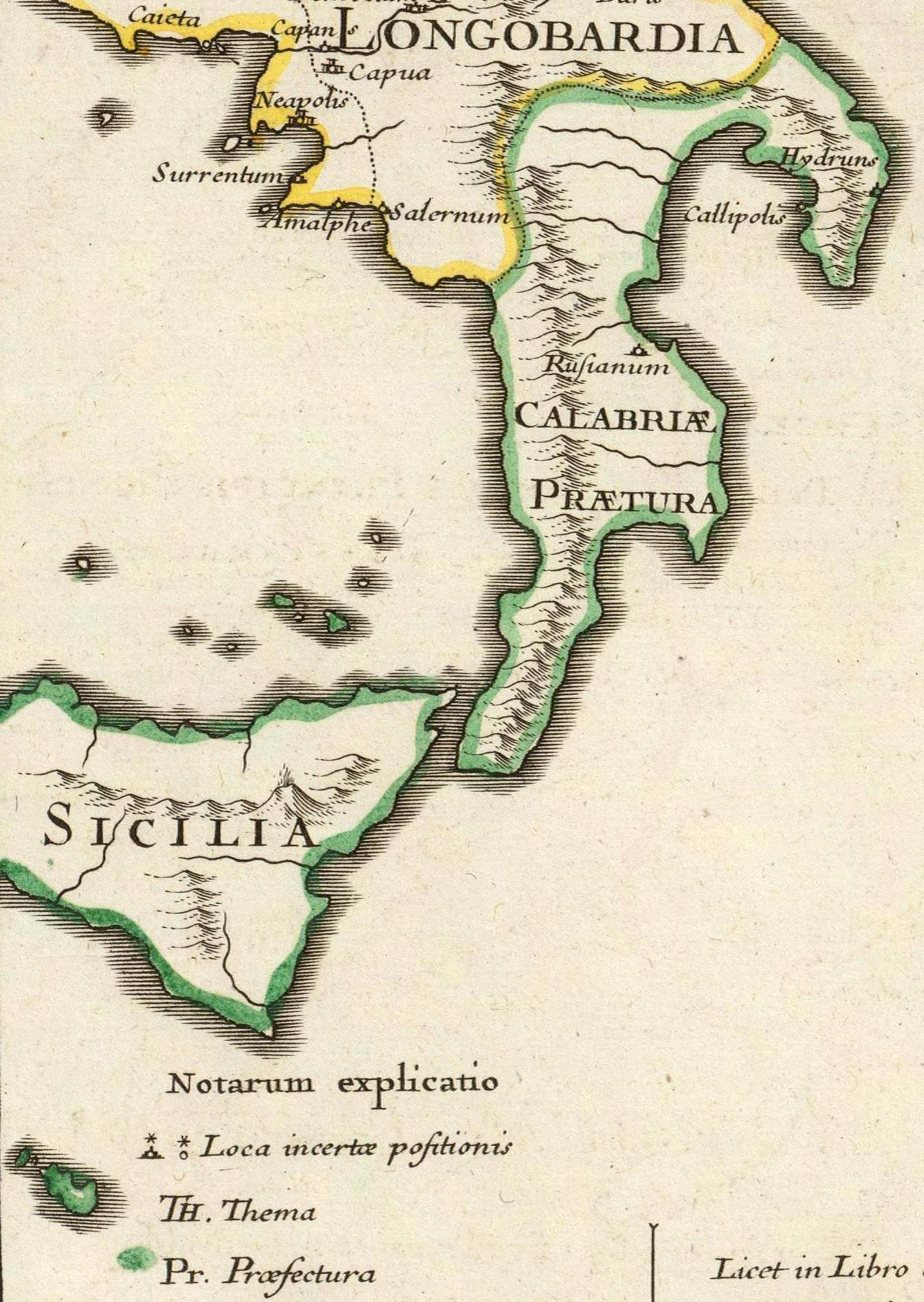
Part of an 18th-century map according to De Administrando Imperio, from the time of Constantine VII

The term was traditionally used for the Lombard possessions, with the chronicler Theophanes the Confessor distinguishing between "Great Longobardia" (Greek: Μεγάλη Λογγοβαρδία; Latin: Longobardia major), namely the Kingdom of the Lombards in northern Italy, and "Lesser Longobardia" (Latin: Longobardia minor), which comprised southern Italy, with the Lombard duchies of Benevento, Spoleto, Salerno and Capua, the Byzantine possessions, and the city-states (Naples, Gaeta and Amalfi) under Byzantine suzerainty.

In its strictest and most technical sense, the name referred to the province (thema) which encompassed the modern Italian region of Apulia and parts of Basilicata, with Bari as its capital. Its exact origin and evolution are not entirely clear. After a century of almost complete absence from the affairs of the Italian peninsula, Byzantium once more began to intervene actively under Basil I (reigned 867–886), whose western policy aimed to clear the Adriatic Sea from Saracen raiders, re-establish Byzantine dominance over Dalmatia, and extend Byzantine control once more over parts of Italy. In this process, Otranto was taken from the Saracens in 873, and in 876 the Byzantines took over Bari, which had been captured from its Saracen rulers in 871 by Louis II of Italy. It was probably at this juncture that the foundations of the later theme were laid, perhaps in the form of a subordinate division (turma) of the thema of Cephallenia.

The campaigns of Nikephoros Phokas the Elder in the mid-880s and of his successors greatly expanded the area under Byzantine control, which came to include all of Calabria, Apulia, and the Basilicata. Even Benevento, the centre of Lombard power in southern Italy, was captured in 891. The first reference to Longobardia as a theme dates to precisely this time, but at first it appears that it was administered jointly with other European themata of the Byzantine Empire: in 891 the first known strategos (military governor) of Longobardia, Symbatikios, was also governor of Macedonia, Thrace and Cephallenia, while his successor George administered Longobardia jointly with its parent thema, Cephallenia. A dedicated strategos solely for Longobardia is only attested from 911 on. In 938 and 956, it also appears united with the thema of Calabria, although the duration of this arrangement is unclear. At any rate, after c. 965, the two themata were permanently united into the new Catepanate of Italy, with the katepano's seat again at Bari.

The Varangian Guard fought as part of the Byzantine army in several campaigns in the area, known to them as Langbardland; in their Scandinavian homeland, their exploits are commemorated in the Italy runestones.

== List of strategoi ==
- Gregorios (876)
- Prokopios (880)
- Stephanos Maxentios (882–885)
- Nikephoros Phokas (885–886)
- Theophylaktos (886–887)
- Constantine (887–888)
- Georgios Patrikios (888–891)
- Symbatikos Protospatharios (891–892)
- Georgios Patrikios (892–894)
- Barsakios (894–895)
- Melissenos (899–905)
- Ioannikios Protospatharios (911)
- Nicholas Picingli (914–915)
- Ursileo (died 921)
- Anastasios (928 × 936)
- Basilios Kladon (938)
- Limnogalactos (940)
- Paschalios Protospatharios (943)
- Malakinos (c. 950)
- Marianos Argyros (955–962)
- Nikephoros Hexakionites (965)

== Sources ==
- Kazhdan, Alexander, ed. (1991). The Oxford Dictionary of Byzantium. New York and Oxford: Oxford University Press. ISBN 978-0-19-504652-6.
- Pertusi, A. (1952). Constantino Porfirogenito: De Thematibus (in Italian). Rome: Biblioteca Apostolica Vaticana.
- Kreutz, Barbara M. (1996). Before the Normans: Southern Italy in the Ninth and Tenth Centuries. Philadelphia: University of Pennsylvania Press. ISBN 0-8122-1587-7.
