= Waifer =

Waifer is a masculine Germanic given name, also rendered Waifar, Waiofar, Guaifer or Guaifar. It is rendered in French as Waifre, Waiffre, Gaifier or Guyver, and in Italian as Guaiferio. It may refer to:

- Waiofar (died 768), last duke of Acquitaine
- Guaifer of Salerno (c. 835–880), Prince of Salerno
- Guaifer of Benevento (died 881), Prince of Benevento
