= Rythmus de captivitate Ludovici imperatoris =

The Rythmus de captivitate Ludovici imperatoris ("Poem on the Captivity of Emperor Louis") is a short alphabetic acrostic poem in Middle Latin lamenting the capture of Louis II, King of Italy and Emperor of the Romans, on 15 August 871. The poem is preserved in a ninth-century manuscript, Veronensis XC (85).

In February 871, after a nearly five-year campaign, Louis conquered the Emirate of Bari and captured the emir, Sawdan. He returned in triumph to Benevento, but his presence there and that of the Empress Engelberga, alienated the local nobility. Adelchis, the prince of Benevento, put the imperial couple under arrest. They were released a month later on 18 September through the negotiations of the bishop of Benevento. As a condition of their liberty, Louis swore an oath never to return to Benevento.

The Rythmus de captivitate Ludovici imperatoris places the blame for Louis's humiliation on his own captive, Sawdan, who is said to have prodded Adelchis into action. The captive emir is the main villain of the piece.

== Editions ==
- Muratori, Lodovico Antonio (ed.). "Rhythmus de Ludovico II. Imperatore per Adelchim, seu Adelgisum Beneventi Principem capto, compositus Anno 871. aut 872." Antiquitates Italicae medii aevi, III (Milan: Typographia Societatis Palatinae, 1740), col. 711–12.
- Méril, Edélestand du (ed.). "Chanson des soldats de Louis II". Poésies populaires latines antérieures au douzième siècle (Paris: Brockhaus et Avenarius, 1843), pp. 264–66.
- Traube, Ludwig (ed.). "Carmina de Ludovico II. imperatore". MGH, Poetae Latini aevi Carolini, III (Berlin: Weidmannsche Buchhandlung, 1886), pp. 403–05.
- Russo Mailler, Carmela. "La politica meridionale di Ludovico II e il Rythmus de captivitate Ludovici imperatoris." Quaderni Medievali, 14 (1982), pp. 6–27.
