= Siege of Salerno =

Siege of Salerno may refer to:

- Siege of Salerno (871–872), by the Aghlabids
- Siege of Salerno (1076), by Robert Guiscard
- Siege of Salerno (1137), by the Republic of Pisa
- Siege of Salerno (1194), by Henry VI, Holy Roman Emperor
