= Fall of Bari =

Fall of Bari may refer to:

- Siege of Bari (870–871), when the Aghlabid-held city fell to the Franks
- Siege of Bari (1068–1071), when the Byzantine-held city fell to the Normans
