= Boso of Provence =

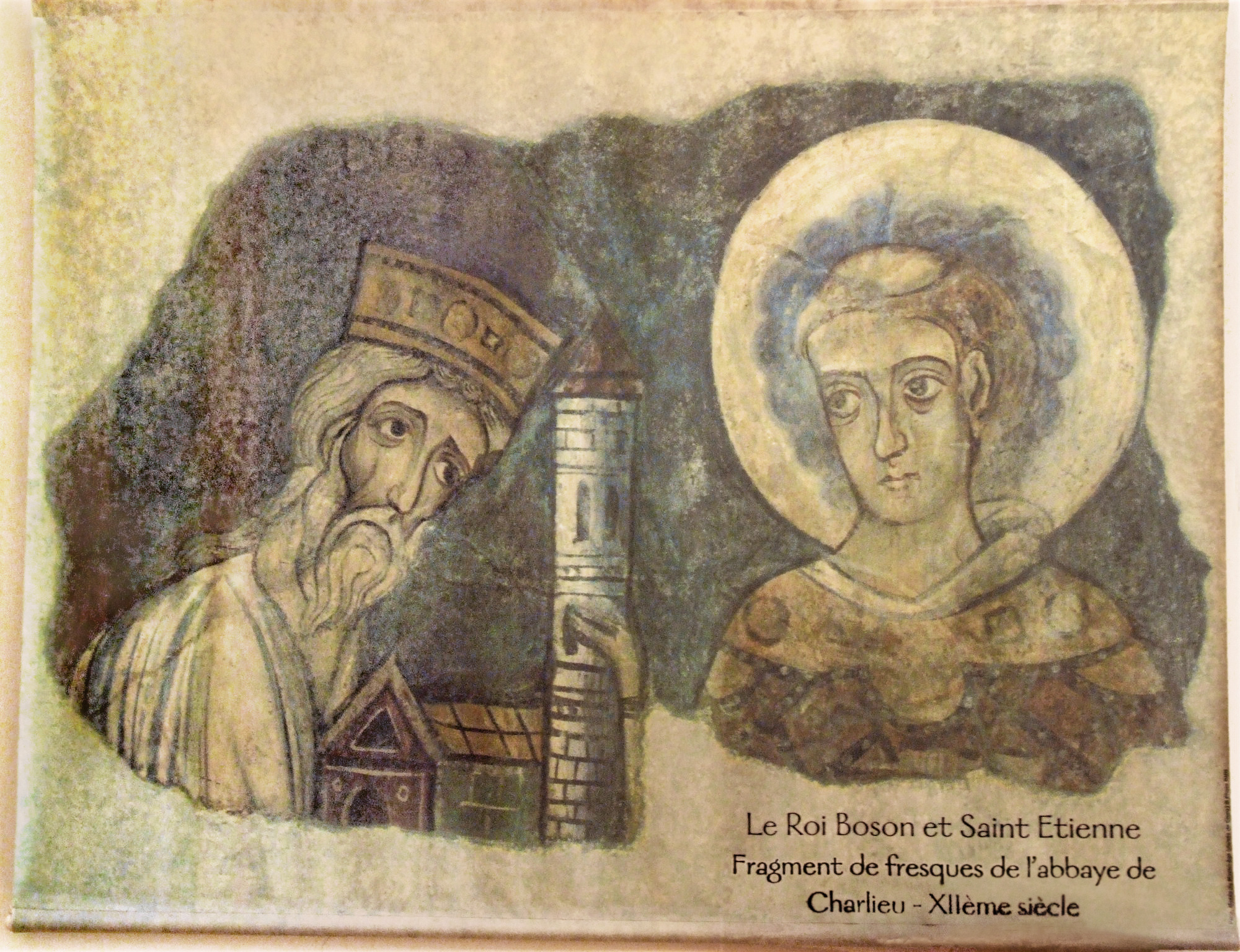

King of Provence Claimant King of West Francia
- Reign: 15 October 879 – 11 January 887
- Predecessor: Louis the Stammerer
- Successor: Louis the Blind
- Born: c. 841
- Died: 11 January 887
- Spouse: Ermengard of Italy
- Issue: Guilla of Provence; Engelberge of Provence; Louis the Blind
- Dynasty: Bivinids; Bosonids (maternal)
- Father: Bivin of Gorze
- Mother: Richildis

Boso of Provence (French: Boson; c. 841 – 11 January 887) was the first non-Carolingian pretender to the royal throne of West Francia in 879, who failed to achieve wider recognition, being accepted only in Lower Burgundy and Provence, where he ruled as king from 879 to 887. By 882, he had already lost much of his Burgundian domains, and had to retreat to his remaining possessions in Provence. By ancestry, he was a Frankish nobleman of the Bosonid family, who was related to the Carolingian dynasty and previously served as a count in several south-eastern counties of the West Frankish realm.

In historiography, he is styled as King of Burgundy or King of Provence.

== Origin ==
Boso was the son of Bivin of Gorze, count of Lotharingia, by Richildis, the daughter of Boso the Elder by his wife Engeltrude. His maternal aunt Teutberga was the wife of King Lothair II of Lotharingia. Boso was also the nephew of Count Boso of Valois, for whom he was named, and of Hucbert, lay abbot of St. Maurice's Abbey, to which Boso succeeded in 869.

== Countship ==
In 870, King Charles the Bald of West Francia married Boso's sister Richilde. This marriage paved the way for Boso's career in the service of his royal brother-in-law. In the same year, Boso was appointed count of Lyon and Vienne, replacing Gerard of Roussillon. In 872, Charles appointed him chamberlain and magister ostiariorum (master of porters) to his heir Louis the Stammerer. Boso likewise received investiture as count of Bourges. Louis was reigning as a subordinate king of Aquitaine, but because of his youth, it was Boso who looked after the administration of that realm.

In the autumn of 875, Boso accompanied Charles on his first Italian campaign and at the diet of Pavia in February 876 he was appointed arch-minister and missus dominicus for Italy and elevated to the rank of duke. He became governor and count of Provence in 877. He acted as a viceroy and married Ermengarde, the only daughter of Emperor Louis II. Boso disapproved of Charles' second Italian campaign in 877 and conspired with other like-minded nobles against his king. After Charles's death in October, these nobles forced Charles's son to confirm their rights and privileges.

Boso also formed close relations to the papacy and accompanied Pope John VIII in September 878 to Troyes, where the Pope asked King Louis for his support in Italy. The Pope adopted Boso as his son and probably offered to crown Louis emperor. It is said that he wanted to crown Boso emperor.

== Kingship ==
Boso's kingdom (in orange) among Carolingian realms in 881

In April 879, Louis the Stammerer died, leaving two adult sons, Louis III and Carloman II. Boso joined with other western Frankish nobles and advocated making Louis III the sole heir of the western kingdom, but eventually both brothers were elected kings. Boso renounced allegiance to the brothers and in July claimed independence by claiming the title Dei gratia id quod sum: by the Grace of God, that is what I am. He also claimed that his imperial father-in-law had named him as his heir. On 15 October 879, the bishops and nobles of the region around the Rhône and Saône rivers assembled in the Synod of Mantaille. They elected Boso king and successor to Louis the Stammerer, the first non-Carolingian king in Western Europe in more than a century. This event was the first "free election" among the Franks, without regard to royal descent, inspired by a canonical principle (but not constant practice) of ecclesiastical elections.

Boso's realm, usually called the Kingdom of Provence, comprised the ecclesiastical provinces of the archbishops of Arles, Aix, Vienne, Lyon (without Langres), and probably Besançon, and the dioceses of Tarentaise, Uzès, and Viviers.

After Louis and Carloman divided their father's realm at Amiens in March 880, the two brothers joined to march against Boso. They took Mâcon and the northern parts of Boso's realm. Then uniting their forces with those of Charles the Fat, they unsuccessfully besieged Vienne from August to November.

In August 882, Boso was again besieged at Vienne by his brother, Richard the Justiciar, duke of Burgundy and count of Autun, who took the city in September. Boso never regained much of his realm and was restricted to the county of Vienne.

He died in 887 and was succeeded by his son Louis the Blind.

== Marriages ==
Boso was married twice. The identity of his first wife is not known; his second wife was Ermengard of Italy, whom he wed in March 876. Their issue was:

- Guilla of Provence (December 873 – before 15 June 929), married firstly Rudolph I of Burgundy, secondly Hugh of Italy; her mother is reported to have been Ermengard, but this seems to be erroneous because she was born before Boso and Ermengarde's wedding
- Engelberge/Ethelberga, married William I, Duke of Aquitaine; her mother is reported to have been Ermengard
- Louis the Blind (before 884 – 5 June 928), (Note: Wickham lists him as Louis III) possibly had a non-marital relationship, next supposedly married Anna/Eudocia Mamikonian (according to a letter that Christian Settipani attributes to Nicholas Mystikos), lastly married Adelaide of Burgundy, who might have been a daughter of his sister Guilla; his mother is reported to have been Ermengard

== Sources ==
- Bouchard, Constance B. (1988). "The Bosonids or Rising to Power in the Late Carolingian Age". French Historical Studies. 15 (3): 407–431.
- Hauff, Andrea (2017). "The Kingdom of Upper Burgundy and the East Frankish Kingdom at the beginning of the 10th century". History Compass. 15 (8): 1–12.
- MacLean, Simon (2001). "The Carolingian response to the revolt of Boso, 879–887". French Historical Studies. 10 (1): 21–48.
- MacLean, Simon (2003). Kingship and Politics in the Late Ninth Century: Charles the Fat and the end of the Carolingian Empire. New York: Cambridge University Press.
- McKitterick, Rosamond (1983). The Frankish Kingdoms Under the Carolingians, 751-987. Harlow: Longman.
- Riché, Pierre (1993). The Carolingians: A Family Who Forged Europe. Philadelphia: University of Pennsylvania Press.
- West, Charles (2023). The Fall of a Carolingian Kingdom: Lotharingia, 855–869. Toronto: University of Toronto Press.
- Wickham, Chris (1989). Early Medieval Italy. The University of Michigan Press.

Preceded by Louis the Stammerer	King of Lower Burgundy; King of Provence; 879–887	Succeeded by Louis the Blind
