= List of south Italian principalities =

Following the collapse of Roman and later Lombard authority in southern Italy, a group of semi-independent principalities evolved between the 8th and 11th centuries:

- Principality of Benevento, a former Lombard duchy, independent from 774
- Principality of Salerno, split off from Benevento in 851
- Principality of Capua, split off from Benevento in 981
- Duchy of Naples, a former Byzantine province, a hereditary principality from 840
- Duchy of Gaeta, its ruler took the title Duke in 933
- Duchy of Amalfi, its ruler took the title Duke in 958
- Duchy of Sorrento, usually under the authority of Amalfi
- Emirate of Bari, an Arab state, founded in 847, conquered in 871
- Emirate of Sicily, independent from 965
- County of Aversa, a Norman fief of Naples from 1030, conquered Capua in 1058
- County of Sicily, the Norman conquest began in 1071, and was finished in 1091; the conquest of Malta was finished in 1127
- Duchy of Apulia and Calabria, the supreme Norman authority on the peninsula from 1047

Eventually, all of these principalities were united under Norman rule and merged into the Kingdom of Sicily, founded in 1130
