= Kanalites =

Medieval Slavic tribe

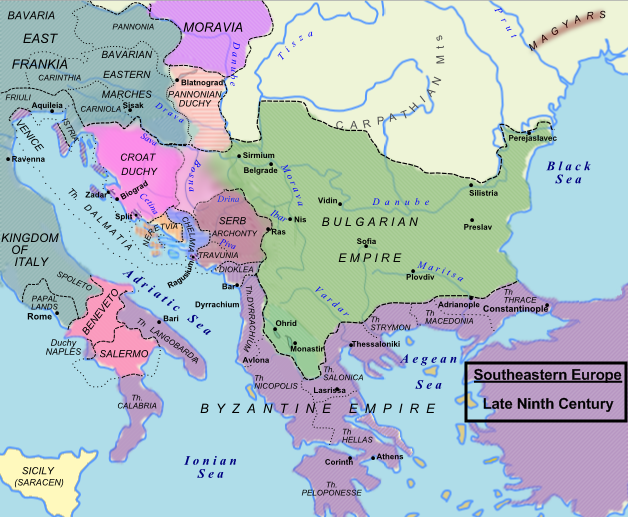
Map of the Western Balkans around 850 AD.

Kanalites (Medieval Greek: Καναλῖται, Serbo-Croatian: Konavljani / Конављани) were a medieval Slavic tribe settled in the today's region of Konavle, within Dalmatia, mentioned in the chapter titled "Of the Terbounians and Kanalites and of the country they now dwell in" of the 10th century De Administrando Imperio by Byzantine Emperor Constantine VII.

The country, located in near proximity to Travunia, reportedly became desolated during the Pannonian Avars invasion, and its inhabitants are descendants from the unbaptized Serbs, from the time of the unnamed 7th-century Serbian ruler who came from Boiki and claimed the protection of the Emperor Heraclius in the 7th century. However, a closer reading suggests that the Constantine consideration about the population's ethnic identity, like in regard to other near polities, is based on Serbian political rule during the time of Časlav in 10th century and does not indicate ethnic origin.

They were mentioned in the Vita Basilii among the Slavs who revolted during the time of Michael II and took part in the siege of Bari on the command of Basil I in 868. The archon of Kanali is recorded in the De Ceremoniis. They were an independent polity at least until 870. Although with Travunia made one political unit at the time of Constantine VII, only Travunia is mentioned under Serbian rule, and there's no mention of Kanali after the unification with Principality of Serbia.

== Etymology ==
Constantine VII in his DAI considered that Kanali "means in the language of the Slavs 'wagon-load', because, the place being level, they carry on all their labours by the use of wagons". Tibor Živković regarded such derivation wrong and rather considered Latin canalis and canabulae.

== See also ==
- Diokletians
- Zachumlians
- Narentines
