= Engelberga of Provence =

Duchess consort of Aquitaine (c. 877–917)

Duchess consort of Aquitaine
- Tenure: c. 893 - c. 917
- Born: c. 877
- Died: 917
- Spouse: William I, Duke of Aquitaine
- Issue: Engelberga unknown daughter
- House: Bivinids
- Father: Boso of Provence
- Mother: Ermengard of Italy

Engelberga of Provence, Duchess of Aquitaine (c. 877–917) was a 8th-9th century Bosonid noblewoman.

Engelberga was the daughter of Ermengard of Italy and Boso of Provence (r. 879–887). She was engaged to Carloman II, the son of Louis the Stammerer, but Carloman died aged about eighteen in 884. She then married William I, Duke of Aquitaine. William and Engelberga's foundation of Cluny Abbey in 910 can be seen as exemplifying tenth-century efforts "to perpetuate the union of two kinship groups by means of a religious institution".

== Marriage and issue ==
She married William I, Duke of Aquitaine, they had:

- Engelberga
- Possibly another daughter
