= Radelgar of Benevento =

Radelgar (Latin: Radelgarius) was the prince of Benevento from 851 until 854. He was the son of Radelchis I and Caretrude. He succeeded his father and married a Beneventa noblewoman named Tasselgarda.

Radelgar died at the age of 31 and is memorialized by a Latin epitaph of fifty lines. His brother Adelchis seized the throne, setting aside Radelgar's infant son, Gaideris. Gaideris later had Adelchis assassinated and seized the throne. Radelgar also had a daughter who married Lando III of Capua.

Regnal titles
Preceded by Radelchis I	Prince of Benevento; 851–854	Succeeded by Adelchis
