= Louis II of Italy =

Ruler of the Carolingian Empire from 844 to 875

Louis II
- Emperor of the Romans
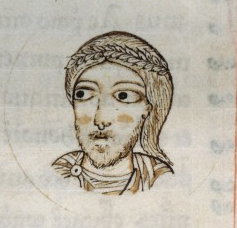
- Louis as shown in a 12th-century manuscript of Johannes Berardi's Chronicon casauriense

Emperor of the Carolingian Empire
- Reign: 15 June 844 – 12 August 875 (with Lothair I until 855)
- Coronation: 15 June 844, Rome
- Predecessor: Lothair I
- Successor: Charles the Bald

King of Italy
- Reign: 844-875
- Predecessor: Lothair I
- Successor: Charles the Bald
- Born: 825
- Died: 12 August 875 (aged 49–50); Ghedi, Italy
- Burial: Basilica of Sant'Ambrogio, Milan
- Spouse: Engelberga
- Issue: Ermengard, Queen of Provence
- Dynasty: Carolingian
- Father: Lothair I
- Mother: Ermengarde of Tours
- Religion: Chalcedonian Christianity

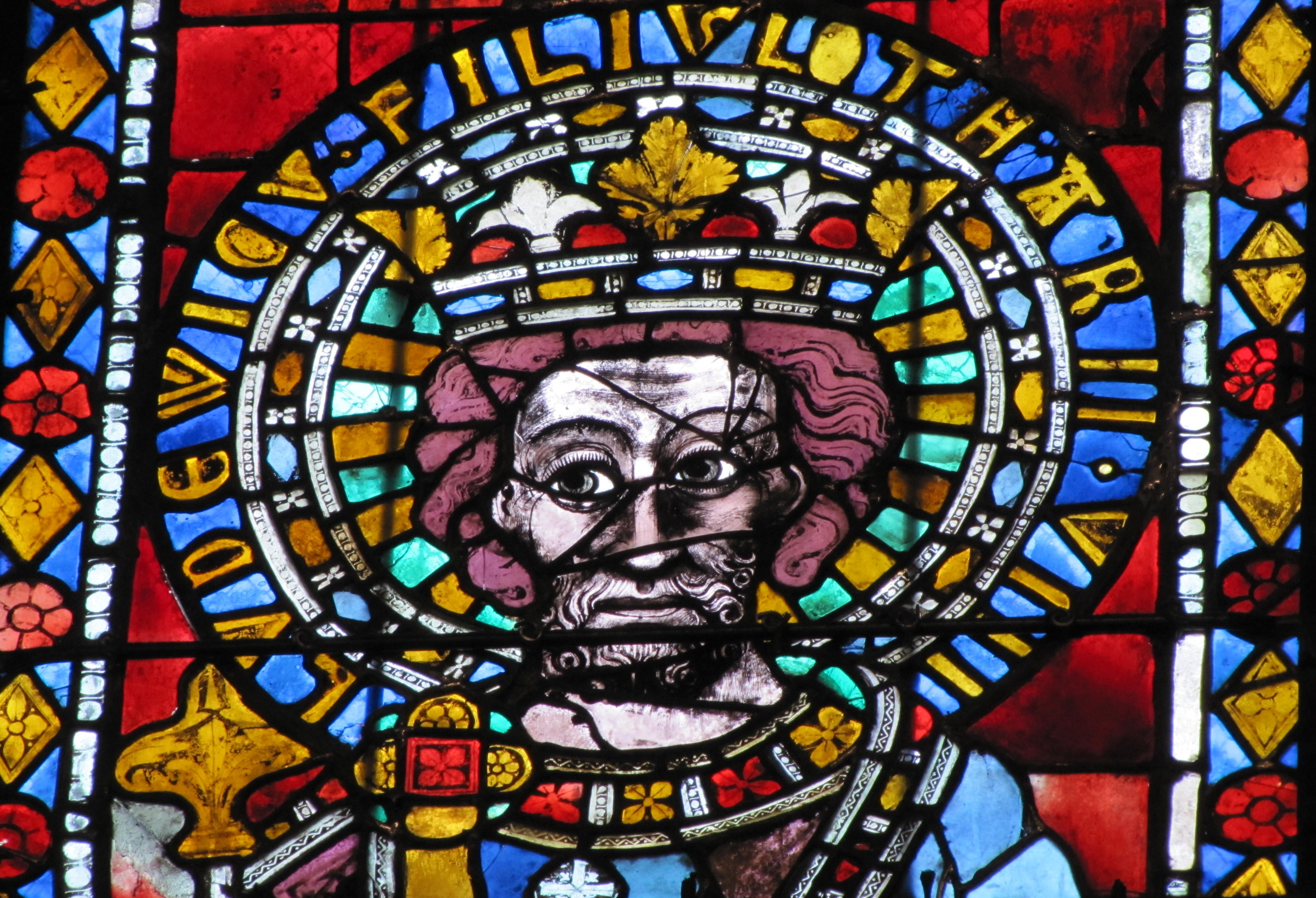
Louis II, from the "Emperor Windows" of Strasbourg Cathedral

Louis II (825 – 12 August 875), sometimes called the Younger, was the king of Italy and emperor of the Carolingian Empire from 844, co-ruling with his father Lothair I until 855, after which he ruled alone.

Louis's usual title was imperator augustus ("august emperor"), but he used imperator Romanorum ("emperor of the Romans") after his conquest of Bari in 871, which led to poor relations with the Eastern Roman Empire. He was called imperator Italiae ("emperor of Italy") in West Francia while the Byzantines called him Basileus Phrangias ("Emperor of Francia").

The chronicler Andreas of Bergamo, who is the main source for Louis's activities in southern Italy, notes that "after his death a great tribulation came to Italy."

== Childhood ==
Division of the Carolingian Empire under the Treaty of Prüm (855)

Louis was born in 825, the eldest son of the junior emperor Lothair I and his wife Ermengarde of Tours. His father was the son of the reigning emperor, Louis the Pious. Little is known about his early life, except that he grew up in his grandfather's court and probably developed a warm affection for the emperor who, in 839, designated his grandson as King of Italy, and let Louis take up his residence in that country.

Louis the Pious died the next year, and his empire was partitioned between his sons: Louis's father, Lothair, and Louis's uncle, Louis the German, as well as their younger half-brother, Charles the Bald. Under his father's rule, he was crowned king and co-emperor to the middle-aged Emperor Lothair I at Rome by Pope Sergius II on 15 June 844. This ceremony mirrors the crowning of Lothair I by his father, a tradition started by Charlemagne and his son Louis the Pious, who were, respectively, great-grandfather and grandfather of Louis II.

== Joint emperor ==
Louis II immediately claimed the rights of an emperor in the city, a claim which was decisively rejected; but in 850 he was crowned joint emperor at Rome by Pope Leo IV, and soon afterwards, in 851, married Engelberga and undertook the independent government of Italy. He marched into the south of Italy in the year of his imperial coronation and compelled the rival dukes of Benevento, Radelchis I and Siconulf, to make peace. His mediation split the Lombard duchy and gave Radelchis his share with Benevento as his capital, while Salerno was given to Siconulf as an independent principality. Radelchis, now pacified, had no need of his Aghlabid mercenaries and happily betrayed them to the emperor. Louis fell on them and they were massacred. He then quashed some accusations against Pope Leo and held a Diet at Pavia. He confirmed the usurping regent Peter as prince of Salerno in December 853, displacing the dynasty he had installed there three years earlier. On the death of his father in September 855, he became sole emperor.

== Sole emperor ==
Expansion of Louis's domains, after the cessions from Lothar II in 859 and the death of his brother Charles of Provence in 863

=== Carolingian interventions ===
Louis II is left without prize after the death of his brother Lothar II in 869

The division of Lothair's domains under the Treaty of Prüm, by which Louis obtained no territory outside Italy, aroused his discontent, and in 857 he allied himself with Louis the German against his own brother Lothair II, and King Charles the Bald. But after Louis had secured the election of Pope Nicholas I in 858, he reconciled with his brother, and received some lands south of the Jura mountains in return for assistance given to Lothair in his efforts to obtain a divorce from his wife, Teutberga.

In 863, upon the death of his brother Charles, Louis received the kingdom of Provence, and in 864 came into collision with Pope Nicholas I over his brother's divorce. The archbishops, who had been deposed by Nicholas for proclaiming this marriage invalid, obtained the support of the emperor, who reached Rome with an army in February 864. However, having been seized with fever, he made peace with the pope and left the city.

=== Bari ===
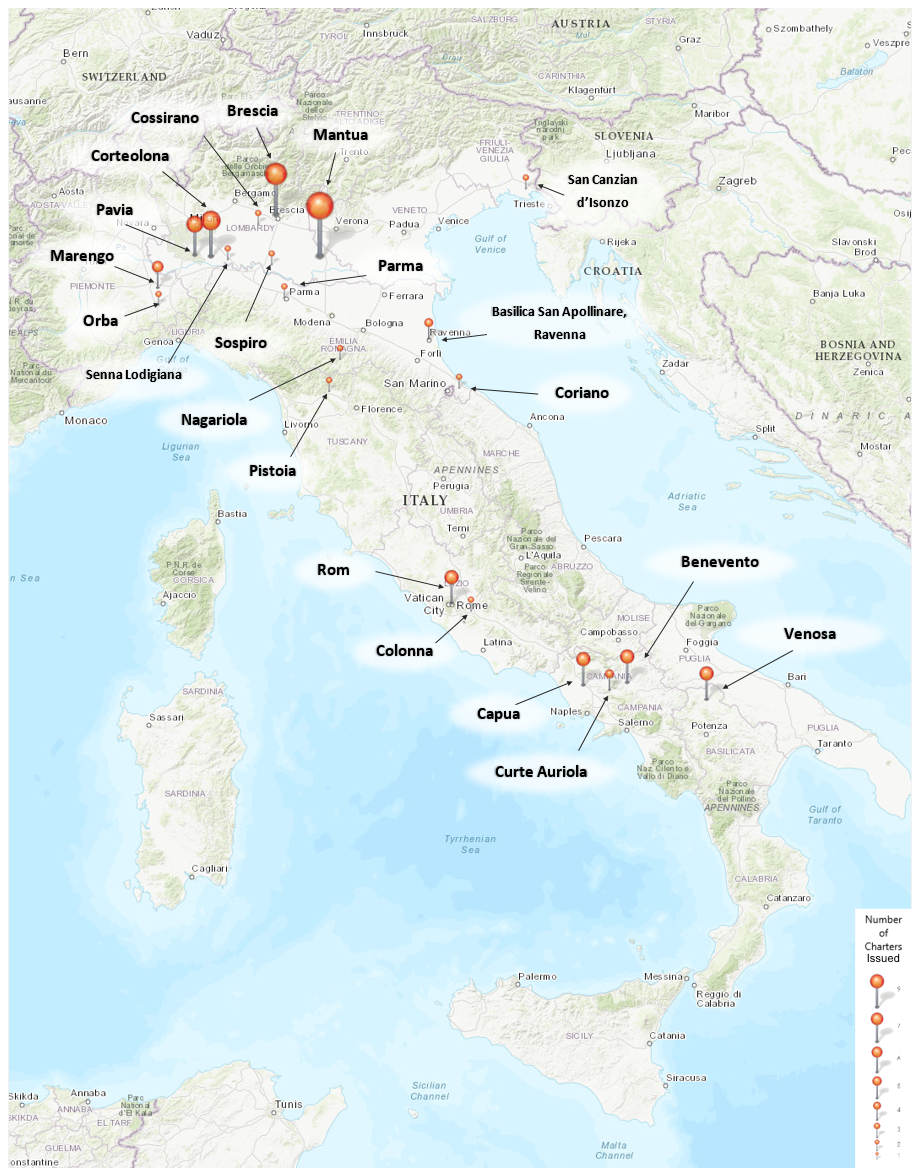
Map of where Emperor Louis II issued charters

In his efforts to restore order in Italy, Louis saw considerable success both against Italy's turbulent princes and against the Aghlabids who were ravaging southern Italy. In 866, after issuing a call for assistance to fight the Muslims, he routed these invaders, but could not follow up his successes owing to the lack of a fleet. So in 869 he made alliance with the eastern emperor, Basil I, who sent him ships to assist in the capture of Bari, capital of the Emirate of Bari, which succumbed in 871.

Meanwhile, his brother Lothair II had died in 869, and owing to his detention in southern Italy, Louis failed to prevent the partition of Lotharingia between Louis the German and Charles the Bald. Division was settled by the Treaty of Meerssen in 870, relinquishing to Louis only the eastern Burgundian regions (both in Lower and Upper Burgundy). Some jealousy between Louis and Basil followed the victory at Bari, and in reply to an insult from the eastern emperor Louis attempted to justify his right to the title "emperor of the Romans."

=== Benevento ===
In 866, while touring southern Italy, Louis II gave heed to an appeal by Pandenulf to depose the incumbent Count of Capua, Landulf II.The appeal was accepted by the emperor, and Capua was laid to siege, with Landulf being deposed. Interestingly, Louis II did not follow through with reinstating Pandenulf, who had claimed the title since 862, and instead appointed the marquis Lambert I of Spoleto, a decision which ultimately backfired for Louis II when Lambert I joined a rebellion against the Frankish emperor in 871 being led by Adelchis of Benevento.

He had withdrawn into Benevento to prepare for a further campaign when he was attacked in his palace, robbed and imprisoned by Adelchis, prince of Benevento, in August 871. The capture of Louis was lamented in a contemporary short poem, the Rythmus de captivitate Ludovici imperatoris. The landing of fresh bands of Aghlabids compelled Adelchis to release his prisoner a month later, and Louis was forced to swear he would take no revenge for this injury, nor ever enter Benevento with an army. Returning to Rome, he was released from his oath, and was crowned a second time as emperor by Pope Adrian II in May 872. Landenulf II was permitted to continue participating in Italian politics by agreeing to cease the hiring Saracen mercenaries.

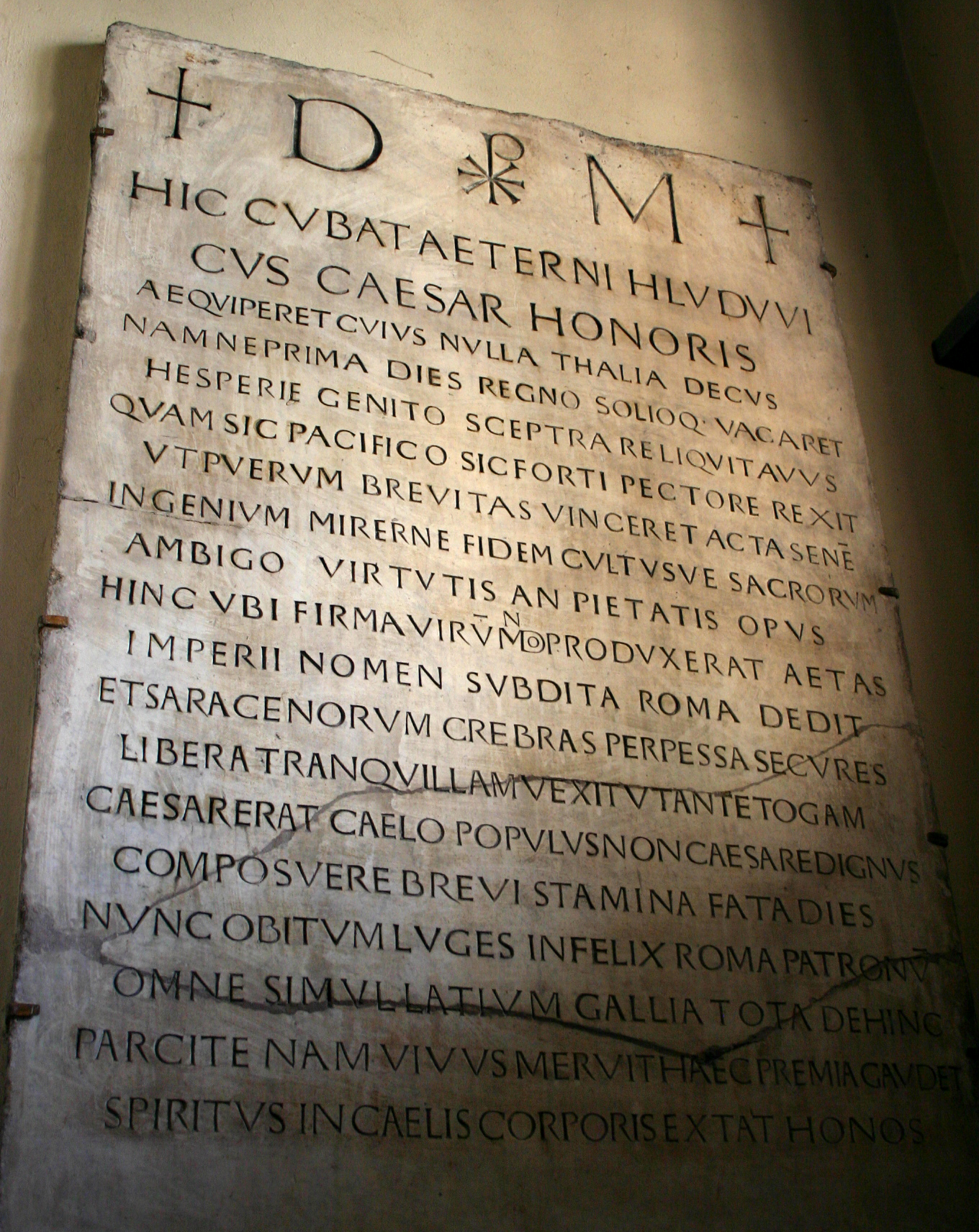
Louis's gravestone in Milan

Louis won further successes against the Aghlabids, relieving the siege of Salerno and driving them from Capua, but the emperor's attempts to punish Adelchis were not very successful. Returning to northern Italy, he died, near Ghedi, in what is now the province of Brescia, on 12 August 875, having named as his successor in Italy his cousin Carloman, son of Louis the German. Louis was buried in the Basilica of Sant'Ambrogio in Milan.

== Family ==
On 5 October 851 Louis married Engelberga, daughter of Adelchis I of Spoleto. They had two daughters:

- Gisela (852/855 – before 28 April 868), Abbess of the Monastery of San Salvador of Brescia from the year 861.
- Ermengard, who married Boso of Provence

== See also ==
- History of Italy
- History of Provence
- History of Burgundy

== Sources ==
- Bouchard, Constance B. (1988). "The Bosonids or Rising to Power in the Late Carolingian Age". French Historical Studies. 15 (3 (Spring)). Duke University Press.
- Gay, Jules (1904). L'Italie méridionale et l'empire byzantin depuis l'avènement de Basile I^{er} jusqu'à la prise de Bari par les Normands (867–1071). Albert Fontemoing.
- Goldberg, Eric J. (2006). Struggle for Empire: Kingship and Conflict under Louis the German, 817-876. Ithaca, NY: Cornell University Press.
- Barbara M. Kreutz Before the Normans: Southern Italy in the Ninth and Tenth Centuries (University of Pennsylvania Press, 1996)
- McKitterick, Rosamond (1983). The Frankish Kingdoms Under the Carolingians, 751-987. Harlow: Longman.
- Nelson, Janet L. (2019). King and Emperor: A New Life of Charlemagne. Oakland: University of California Press.
- Reuter, Timothy (2013) [1991]. Germany in the Early Middle Ages c. 800–1056. London and New York: Routledge.
- Schutz, Herbert (2004). The Carolingians in Central Europe, Their History, Arts, and Architecture: A Cultural History of Central Europe, 750-900. Leiden-Boston: Brill.
- West, Charles (2023). The Fall of a Carolingian Kingdom: Lotharingia, 855–869. Toronto: University of Toronto Press.

Emperor Louis II the Younger Carolingian dynasty Died: 12 August 875
Regnal titles
Preceded by Lothair I	King of Italy; 844 – 875 with Lothair I (844–855)	Succeeded by Charles the Bald
Preceded by Lothair I	Carolingian emperor 850 – 875 with Lothair I (850–855)	Succeeded by Charles the Bald
