= Guaifer of Benevento =

Guaifer (also Waifer, Waifar, or Gaideris) was the prince of Benevento from 878, the death of his uncle Adelchis, to his own death a short three years later, in 881. Guaifer was the son of Radelgar, but he was too young to succeed on his father's death in 854 and so had to await the death of his uncle first.

In 879, during the contest over the throne of Capua and its diocese, he came to the aid of Pandenulf against his own brother-in-law, Lando III. However, in 882 he was expelled and fled to Byzantine emperor Basil I who gave him the title of Protospatharios and gave him command over the town of Oria.

Regnal titles
Preceded by Adelchis	Prince of Benevento; 878–881	Succeeded by Radelchis II
