= Ermengard of Italy =

Queen consort of Provence
- Tenure: 879 – 887
- Died: 896/897
- Spouse: Boso of Provence
- Issue: Engelberga; Louis the Blind
- Dynasty: Carolingian
- Father: Louis II of Italy
- Mother: Engelberga

Ermengard of Italy (died 896/897) was the queen of Provence as the wife of King Boso. She was the second and only surviving child of Emperor Louis II. In her early life, she was betrothed to Constantine, the junior Byzantine emperor, but whether the marriage actually occurred or not is still debated among historians. In 871, Ermengard and her family were taken hostage by Adelchis of Benevento but were later freed. In 876, Ermengard married Boso, a nobleman with connections to the Carolingian dynasty, and became queen upon his accession to the throne of Provence in 879. After her husband's death in 887, she ruled the kingdom as regent during the minority of their son Louis the Blind.

== Early life and engagement to Constantine ==
Ermengard was the daughter of Emperor Louis II, who ruled over Italy, and Engelberga,. Ermengard's granduncle was Emperor Charles the Bald. In her youth, she was instructed in the scriptures by Anastasius Bibliothecarius, the chief archivist of the papal Lateran Palace. In 869, the courts of the Carolingian and Byzantine Empires entered into discussions to arrange an alliance against the Saracens in southern Italy. During the negotiations, in addition to a military alliance, a marriage between Ermengard and Constantine, the eldest son of Emperor Basil I, (Note: While nominally the son of Basil I, some historians speculate that Constantine was actually the son of the future Michael III.) was proposed.

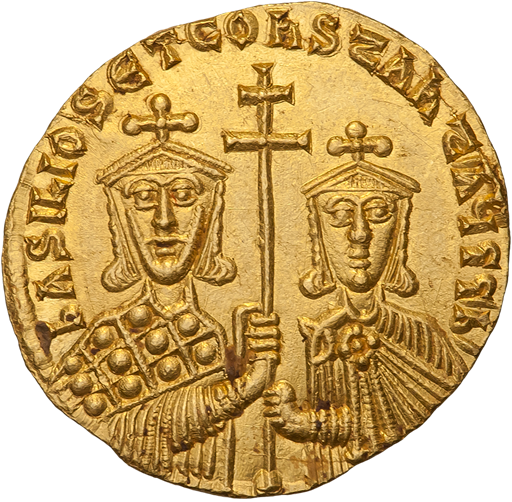
Golden coin showing Constantine (right) with Emperor Basil I (left)

Ermengard and Constantine were betrothed in 870 or 871. To this end, an ambassador was sent by Louis to the Byzantine Empire. The Carolingian and Frankish annals Annales Bertiniani referred to Ermengard in 879 as "filia imperatoris Italiae et desponsata imperatori Greciae" (lit. 'daughter of the emperor of Italy and engaged to the emperor of Greece'). However, the annals erroneously refer to Ermengard's betrothed as Basil, not Constantine. Whether the marriage actually occurred is still debated among historians. The historians Charles Previté-Orton and Werner Ohnsorge take the position that they married, but Shaun Tougher argues that there is no evidence of this, considering the arrangement more of a child's engagement than a true marriage, given that Constantine would have been either 13 or 14 at the time and many Byzantine men married at age 15. Louis refused to hand over Ermengard to the patriarch sent by the Byzantines to bring her to the Byzantine Empire. The alliance between the empires failed to come into fruition, and in the Prosopographie der mittelbyzantinischen Zeit (lit. 'Prosopography of the Middle Byzantine Period'), its authors, including the Byzantinist Ralph-Johannes Lilie, argue that the marriage of Ermengard and Constantine did not either. Instead, the correspondence between Louis and Basil reveal a feud over the right to the imperial Roman title, Basil refusing to yield the status of Roman emperor to Louis.

In August 871, Ermengard and her family were held hostage by Adelchis of Benevento. They remained in captivity until September; during that time, rumors circulated that the imperial family were dead. The bishop of Benevento managed to have them freed, and Ermengard is not mentioned by chronicles until her marriage in 876.

== Queen of Provence ==
In 876, sometime between February and June, with the approval of Charles, Ermengard was married to Boso of Provence, who was a nobleman with close relations to the Carolingian dynasty. Based on her betrothal to Constantine, the medievalist René Poupardin placed Ermengard somewhere between 17 and 25 years old at the time of her marriage to Boso. In 879, the West Frankish king Louis the Stammerer died. Boso intended to have himself elected as the new monarch of West Francia, but ended up as ruler of Provence. His rise to the throne of Provence was aided by Ermengard and her mother Engelberga. The historian Constance Bouchard states that "Ermengard was indeed quoted at the time as saying that she, daughter of the Roman emperor, who had once been affianced to the Greek emperor, would not want to live if she could not make her own husband king". The couple had three surviving children: a son, Louis the Blind, and two daughters, Engelberga and an unnamed child.

In 878, Ermengard and her husband welcomed Pope John VIII in Arles after the pontiff fled Rome. The couple made a good impression on John, revealed by his correspondence with Ermengard's mother Engelberga. Boso died in 887, leaving his children under the protection of Ermengard. In May, Ermengard travelled with her son to the court of her cousin Emperor Charles the Fat, and according to the East Frankish Annales Fuldenses, she managed to convince Charles to, as Bouchard puts it, "'quasi-adopt' Boso's young son Louis as his own son". In 890, Louis was elected to succeed to his father's kingdom of Provence. During the minority of her son, Queen Ermengard ruled Provence as regent.

Ermengard died in 896/897. In June 897, Ermengard's son Louis requested prayers for the repose of the souls of both his parents.

== Sources ==
- Adontz, Nicholas (1956). "Basil I, the Armenian (Emperor of Byzantium 867–886)". Armenian Review. 9.
- Bouchard, Constance Brittain (1988). "The Bosonids or Rising to Power in the Late Carolingian Age". French Historical Studies. 15 (3) (3 ed.). Society for French Historical Studies]: 407–431. doi:10.2307/286367. JSTOR 286367.
- Herrin, Judith (2001). Women in Purple: Rulers of Medieval Byzantium. Princeton, New Jersey: Princeton University Press. ISBN 978-0-691-11780-5.
- Ostrogorsky, George (1956). History of the Byzantine State. New Brunswick, New Jersey: Rutgers University Press. ISBN 978-0-813-51198-6.
- Poupardin, René (1901). Le Royaume de Provence Sous Les Carolingiens (855-933?) (in French). Librairie Émile Bouillon. OL 14019078M.
- Lilie, Ralph-Johannes; Ludwig, Claudia; Pratsch, Thomas; Zielke, Beate (1998–2013). Prosopographie der mittelbyzantinischen Zeit (in German). Berlin and Boston: De Gruyter.
- Tougher, Shaun (1994). The Reign of Leo VI (886–912): Personal Relationships and Political Ideologies (PhD thesis). St. Andrews: University of St. Andrews. hdl:10023/14582.
- Tougher, Shaun (1997). The Reign of Leo VI (886–912): Politics and People. Leiden: Brill. ISBN 978-90-04-10811-0.
