= Edelestand du Méril =

French historian (1801–1870)

- Born: 26 March 1801; Valognes (Manche)
- Died: 24 May 1870 (aged 69); Paris
- Occupation: Historian

Edelestand Pontas du Méril (26 March 1801 – 24 May 1870) was a French medievalist and philologist.

== Bibliography ==
- Philosophie du budget. Merlin. 1835.
- Histoire de la poésie scandinave. Paris, Franck. 1839.
- Essai philosophique sur le principe et les formes de versification. Brockhaus et Avenarius, Joubert. 1841.
- Poésies populaires latines antérieures au douzième siècle. 1843.
- Essai sur l'origine des runes. 1844.
- La Mort de Garin le Loherain. 1846.
- Poésies populaires latines du Moyen Age. 1847.
- Dictionnaire du patois normand. Caen, Bernard Mancel. 1849.
- Les Origines latines du théâtre moderne. 1849.(Du Méril s’y livre à une revue très intéressante des curieuses coutumes qui existaient dans presque tous les diocèses et rendaient plus évidentes les intentions dramatiques du culte.)
- Mélanges archéologiques et littéraires. Franck. 1850.
- Essai philosophique sur la formation de la langue française. Franck. 1852.
- Poésies inédites du moyen âge, précédées d'une histoire de la fable ésopique. 1854.
- Floire et Blanceflor, poèmes du XIIIe, publiés d'après les manuscrits avec une introduction, des notes et un glossaire. Jannet. 1856.
- Des formes du mariage et des usages populaires qui s'y rattachent surtout en France pendant le Moyen-Age. Paris, A. Franck. 1861.
- Études sur quelques points d'archéologie et d'histoire littéraire. 1862.
- Histoire de la comédie ancienne. Didier et Cie. 1869.
