= Andreas of Bergamo =

Italian historian

Andreas of Bergamo (Latin: Andreas Bergomas) was an Italian historian of the late ninth century. He composed a continuation of the Historia Langobardorum of Paul the Deacon down to ca. 877. The short continuation, untitled in the manuscripts, is sometimes called the Andreæ presbyteri Bergomatis chronicon (Chronicle of Andreas the priest of Bergamo). All that is known of Andreas is that he was a priest of the diocese of Bergamo that he helped carry the coffin of the Emperor Louis II from the river Oglio as far as the Adda in 875. However, he never says that he was from Bergamo and he never identifies himself as either a Lombard or a Frank.

Andreas's chronicle is an important primary source for ninth-century Italy, especially the Po Valley. It is the best source for the succession dispute following the death of the Louis II.

His chronicle does not have a prologue or a dedication. It begins with the arrival of the Lombards in Italy under Alboin (568-572), but down to the reign of Liutprand (712–744) it is just a summary of Paul the Deacon's work. From Liutprand on, it is an original work. It concerns itself mainly with high politics and the acts of the Carolingian rulers of northern Italy, as well as Louis II's campaigns in southern Italy.

== Editions ==
- *Italian Carolingian Historical and Poetic Texts, edited and translated by L. A. Berto. Pisa: Pisa University Press, 2016.

Franks and Lombards in Italian Carolingian Texts: Memories of the Vanquished, edition and translation by L. A. Berto (Abingdon and New York: Routledge, 2021).
