= Emirate of Bari =

c. 847 – 871 Islamic State in Apulia

Emirate of Bari إمارة باري (Arabic)
- 847–871
- Status: De jure governorate of the Abbasid Caliphate
- Capital: Bari
- Official languages: Arabic
- Common languages: Italian Romance; Greek
- Religion: Sunni Islam (official) Chalcedonian Christianity (majority)
- Government: Monarchy
- Emir
  - 847–c. 852: Khalfun
  - c. 857–871: Sawdan
- History
  - Established: 847
  - Disestablished: 871
Preceded by	Succeeded by
Byzantine Empire	Byzantine Empire
- Today part of: Italy

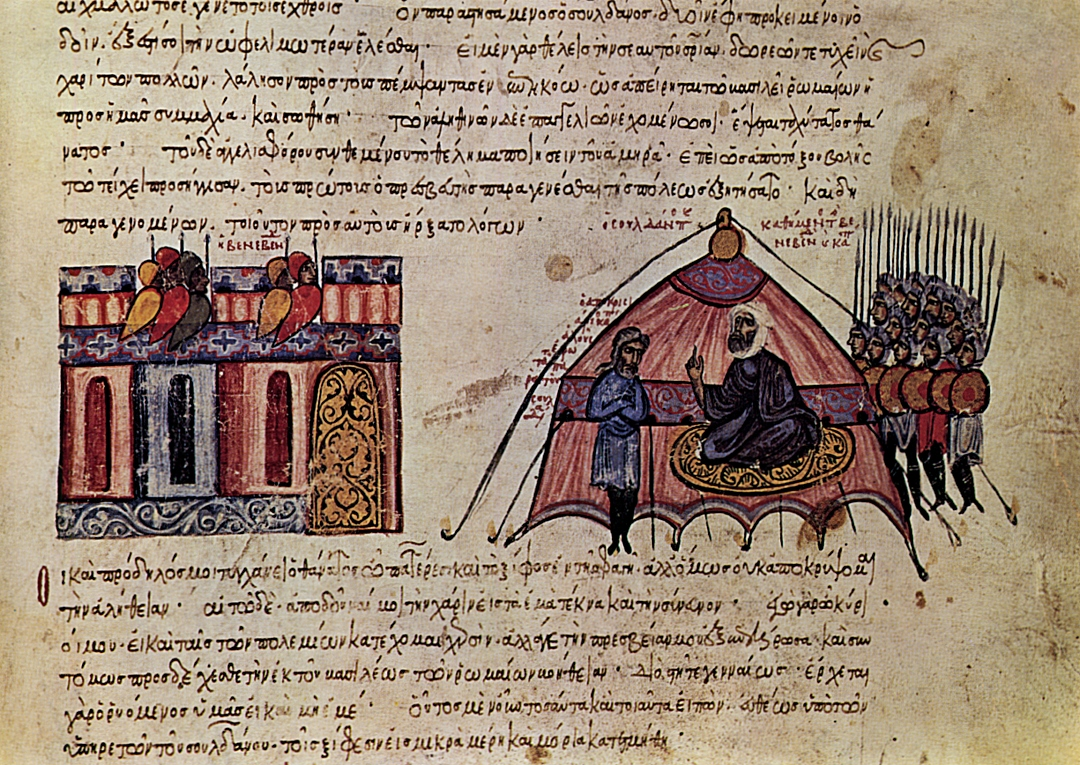
During the siege of Benevento, Emir Soldanos (Sawdān) of Bari negotiates with a Byzantine envoy. From the Madrid Skylitzes

The Emirate of Bari (Arabic: إمارة باري, romanized: Imārat Bārī) was a short-lived Islamic state in Apulia (in present-day Italy), ruled by Berbers. Controlled from the Southern Italian city of Bari, it was established in about 847 AD when the region was taken from the Byzantine Empire, but fell 24 years later, in 871, to the army of the Carolingian emperor Louis II. The emirate is notable for being the only Muslim state ever established on the Italian mainland.

== Foundation ==
In the first half 9th century, Byzantine Empire was locked in long struggle with the Lombards of Benevento. The Empire struggled to hold the coastal holdouts of Bari, Brindisi, and Taranto that frequently exchanged hands between the two states. While Saracens had raided the island of Ischia in 812, next twenty years in South Italy receive few reports of Muslim piracy. However, in 835, Duchy of Naples became fearful of Prince Sicard's dominion and employed Arab mercenaries from Sicily. In 838, these mercenaries sacked Lombard held Brindisi. In following year, Prince Sicard was assassinated and triggering a long civil war between Radelchi and Siconulf. Both decided to hire Arab mercenaries that had been rampaging in Italy. During civil war the Arabs rooted themselves in Lombard held cities often serving in garrisons. Bari first became the object of Aghlabid raids in late 840 or early 841, when it was briefly occupied.

According to Al-Baladhuri, Bari was conquered from the Byzantine Empire by Kalfün, a Berber of the Rabīʿa tribe, around 847. The coastal city of Bari was inhabited by Christians before its conquest by Khalfūn al-Barbarī, a mawla of Aghlabid Emir of Africa. After an unsuccessful attack by Ḥabla, Khalfūn captured the city at the beginning of Caliph al-Mutawakkil's reign, around 847. This date, adopted by scholars such as Musca and Talbi, has traditionally been used to date the Islamic conquest of Bari. The conquest was seen by contemporary Muslims as unimportant, having been carried out by a minor figure without the support of any other Muslim state. However, Kalfün's successor Mufarrag ibn Sallam sent requests to Abbasid caliph al-Mutawakkil in Baghdad as well as to his provincial governor of Egypt asking for recognition of the conquest with the title of wali, a governor ruling over a province of the Caliphate, which was granted. Mufarrag expanded Muslim influence and enlarged the territory of the emirate.

== Rule of Sawdan ==
The third and last emir of Bari was Sawdan (also known as Soldan), who came to power around 857 after the murder of his predecessor Mufarrag. He invaded the lands of the Lombard Principality of Benevento, forcing Prince Adelchis to pay tribute. In 864 he finally obtained the official investiture requested initially by Mufarrag. In the middle of the 860s, a Frankish monk named Bernard and two companions stopped in Bari on a pilgrimage to Jerusalem. They successfully petitioned Sawdan for letters of safe-conduct all the way through Egypt and the Holy Land. According to the Itinerarium Bernardi, Bernard's record of the event, Bari, the civitatem Sarracenorum, had formerly belonged to the "Beneventans".

The Hebrew Chronicle of Ahimaaz records that Sawdan, the last emir of Bari, ruled the city wisely and was on good terms with the eminent Jewish scholar Abu Aaron. Christian monastic chronicles, however, portray the emir as nequissimus ac sceleratissimus: "most vile and wicked". Certainly Muslims raids on Christians (and Jews) did not cease during Sawdan's reign. There is evidence for high civilisation in Bari at this point. Giosuè Musca suggests that the emirate was a boon to the regional economy, and that during this time the slave trade, wine trade, and trade in pottery flourished. Under Sawdan the city of Bari was embellished with a mosque, palaces, and public works.

In 859, Lambert I of Spoleto joined Gerard, count of Marsi, Maielpoto, gastald of Telese, and Wandelbert, gastald of Boiano, to prevent Sawdan from re-entering Bari after a campaign against Capua and the Terra di Lavoro. Despite a bloody battle, the emir successfully entered his capital.

Map of the Byzantine-Arab naval competition from the 7th to 11th centuries, with the Emirates of Bari and Taranto indicated by green anchors on the Italian 'boot heel'

The emirate of Bari lasted long enough to enter into relations with its Christian neighbours. According to the Chronicon Salernitanum, ambassadors (legati) were sent to Salerno where they stayed in the episcopal palace, much to the dismay of the bishop. Bari also served as a refuge for at least one political rival of the Carolingian emperor Louis II, a man of Spoleto who fled to it during a revolt.

== Fall ==
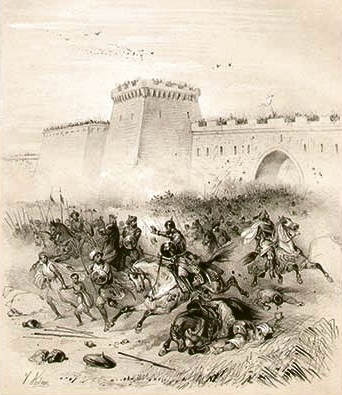
The joint capture of Bari by Franco-Lombard troops under the direction of the Emperor Louis II in 871.

In 865, Louis II, perhaps pressured by the Church, always uncomfortable with a Muslim state in Italy's midst, issued a capitulary calling upon the fighting men of northern Italy to gather at Lucera in the spring of 866 for an assault on Bari. It is unknown, from contemporary sources, whether this force ever marched on Bari, but in the summer of that year the Emperor was touring the Campania with his empress, Engelberga, and receiving strong urging from the Lombard princes—Adelchis of Benevento, Guaifer of Salerno, and Landulf II of Capua—to attack Bari again.

It was not until the spring of 867 that Louis took action against the emirate. He immediately besieged Matera and Oria, recently conquered, and burnt the former. Oria was a prosperous locale before the Muslim conquest; Barbara Kreutz thus conjectures that Matera resisted Louis while Oria welcomed him: the former thus was razed. This may have severed communications between Bari and Taranto, the other pole of Muslim power in Southern Italy. Louis established a garrison at Canosa on the frontier between Benevento and Bari, but retired to the former by March 868. It was probably at about this time that Louis entered into negotiations with the new Byzantine emperor, Basil I. A marriage between Louis's daughter Ermengard and Basil's eldest son, Constantine, was probably discussed in return for Byzantine naval assistance in the taking of Bari. The Chronicon Salernitanum inconsistently attaches the initiative for such talks to Louis and then Basil.

The joint attack was projected for late in the summer of 869 and Louis remained at Benevento planning as late as June. The Byzantine fleet—of four hundred ships if the Annales Bertiniani are to be trusted—arrived under the command of Nicetas with the expectation that Louis would hand over his daughter immediately. This he refused to do, for no known reason, but perhaps because Nicetas had refused to recognise his imperial title, since Louis later refers in a letter to the commander's "insulting behaviour". Perhaps, however, the fleet simply arrived too late in autumn.

In 870, the Bariot Muslims stepped up their raids, going so far as to ravage the Gargano Peninsula including the Sanctuary of Monte Sant'Angelo. The Emperor Louis organised a response, fighting his way deep into Apulia and Calabria but bypassing major population centres like Bari or Taranto. A few towns were apparently freed of Muslim control and the various Muslim bands encountered were universally defeated. Probably encouraged by these successes, Louis attacked Bari with a ground force of Franks, Germans, and Lombards and aided by a fleet of Sclavini. In February 871, the citadel fell and Sawdan was captured and taken to Benevento in chains. The report found in the De Administrando Imperio of Constantine Porphyrogenitus that the Byzantines played a major role in the city's fall is probably a concoction. In the siege of Arab Bari (868–871), Domagoj participated with a Ragusan fleet which, according to Constantine VII transported Croats and other Archons of Slavs on their ships to Longobardia.

== List of emirs ==
- Kalfün (Khalfun), 841–c. 852
- Mufarrag ibn Sallam, c. 852–c. 857
- Sawdan (Sawdān), c. 857–871

== Bibliography ==
=== Primary sources ===
The following are available as part of Sources of Lombard History at the Institut für Mittelalter Forschung:

- Chronica Sancti Benedicti Casinensis
- Chronicon Salernitanum
- Erchempert. Historiola

See too the letter of Emperor Louis II to Emperor Basil I, written in 871 after the capture of Bari, in English translation.

=== Secondary sources ===
- Bondioli, Lorenzo M. (2018). "Islamic Bari between the Aghlabids and the Two Empires". In Glaire D. Anderson; Corisande Fenwick; Mariam Rosser-Owen (eds.). The Aghlabids and Their Neighbors: Art and Material Culture in Ninth-Century North Africa. Brill. pp. 470–490.
- Di Branco, Marco; Wolf, Kordula. (2013) "Berbers and Arabs in the Maghreb and Europe, medieval era". The Encyclopedia of Global Human Migration, ed. Immanuel Ness, vol. 2. Chichester, pp. 695–702.
- Kreutz, Barbara M. (1996) Before the Normans: Southern Italy in the Ninth and Tenth Centuries. Philadelphia: University of Pennsylvania Press. ISBN 0-8122-1587-7.
- Musca, Giosuè (1964). L'emirato di Bari, 847–871. (Università degli Studi di Bari Istituto di Storia Medievale e Moderna, 4.) Bari: Dedalo Litostampa.
  - Drew, K. F. (1965) Review of L'emirato di Bari, 847–871, Giosuè Musca. The American Historical Review, 71:1 (Oct.), p. 135.
  - Krueger, Hilmar C. (1966) Review of L'emirato di Bari, 847–871, Giosuè Musca. Speculum, 41:4 (Oct.), p. 761.
