= Bolesław I the Brave =

Duke and King of Poland (r. 992–1025)

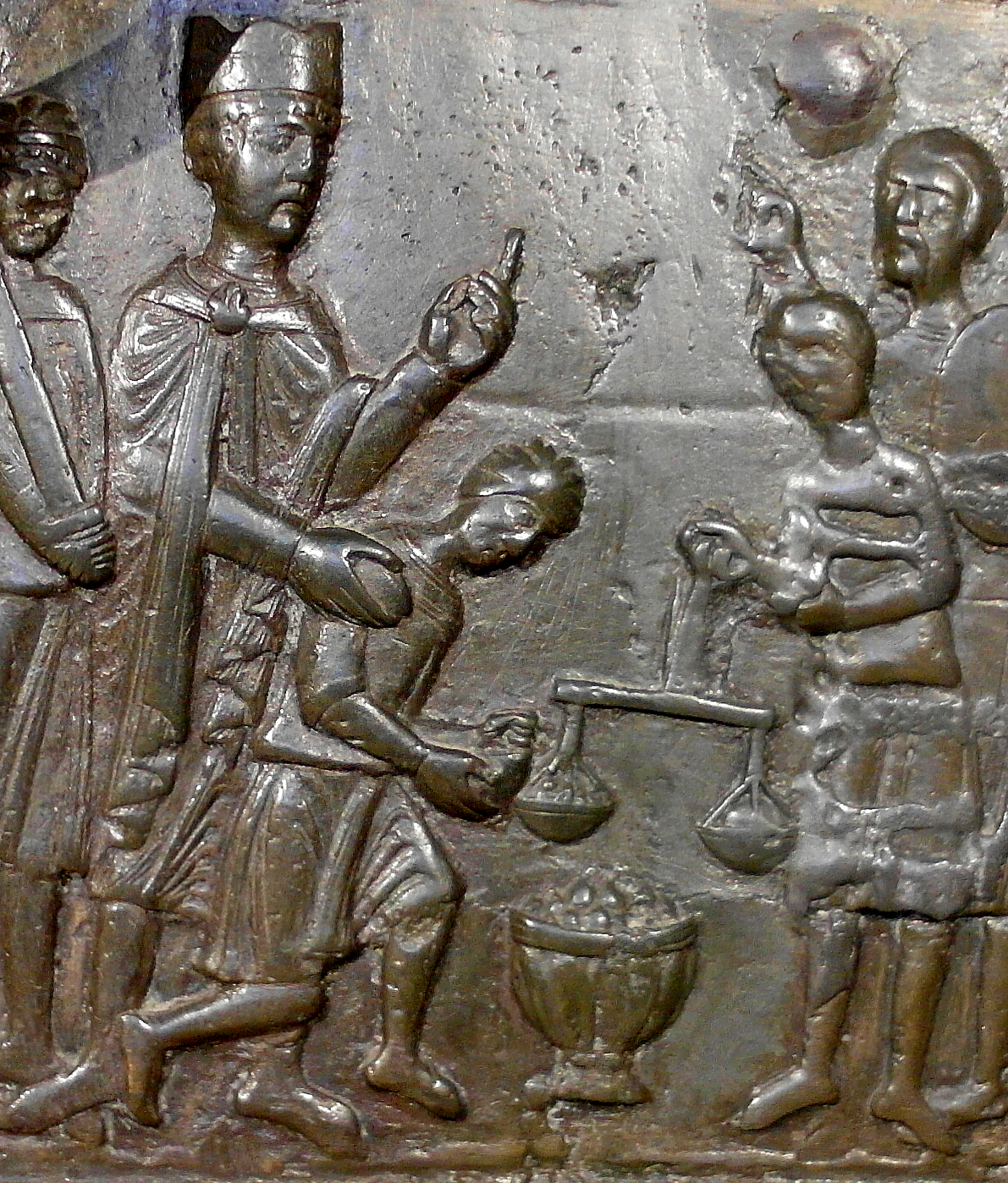
- Bolesław I buys the corpse of Saint Adalbert for its weight in gold, Gniezno Doors, c. 1170.

Duke of Poland
- Reign: 992 – 1025
- Predecessor: Mieszko I

Duke of Bohemia
- Reign: 1003 – 1004
- Predecessor: Boleslaus III
- Successor: Jaromír

King of Poland
- Reign: 1025
- Successor: Mieszko II Lambert
- Born: c. 967
- Died: 17 June 1025 (aged 57–58)
- Burial: Cathedral Basilica of Sts. Peter and Paul, Poznań
- Wives: Unknown daughter of Rikdag; Unnamed Hungarian; Emnilda of Lusatia; Oda of Meissen
- Issue Detail: Bezprym; Regelinda; Mieszko II Lambert; Otto
- Dynasty: Piast
- Father: Mieszko I
- Mother: Doubravka of Bohemia
- Religion: Chalcedonian Christianity

Bolesław I the Brave (Note: Polish: Bolesław I Chrobry Polish; Czech: Boleslav Chrabrý; Latin: Boleslaus I rex Poloniae) (c. 967 – 17 June 1025), less often known as Bolesław the Great, (Note: Polish: Bolesław Wielki) was Duke of Poland from 992 to 1025 and the first King of Poland in 1025. He was also Duke of Bohemia between 1003 and 1004 as Boleslaus IV. A member of the Piast dynasty, Bolesław was a capable monarch and a strong mediator in Central European affairs. He continued to proselytise Western Christianity among his subjects and raised Poland to the rank of a kingdom, thus becoming the first Polish ruler to hold the title of rex, Latin for King.

The son of Mieszko I by his first wife Doubravka of Bohemia, Bolesław ruled Lesser Poland already during the final years of Mieszko's reign. When the country became divided in 992, he banished his father's widow, Oda of Haldensleben and his half-brothers, purged their adherents, and successfully reunified Poland by 995. As a devout Christian, Bolesław supported the missionary endeavours of Adalbert of Prague and Bruno of Querfurt. The martyrdom of Adalbert in 997 and Bolesław's successful attempt to ransom the bishop's remains, paying for their weight in gold, consolidated Poland's autonomy from the Holy Roman Empire.

At the Congress of Gniezno (11 March 1000), Emperor Otto III permitted the establishment of a Polish church structure with a metropolitan see at Gniezno, independent from the Archbishopric of Magdeburg. Bishoprics were also established in Kraków, Wrocław, and Kołobrzeg, and Bolesław formally repudiated paying tribute to the Empire. Following Otto's death in 1002, Bolesław fought a series of wars against Otto's cousin and heir, Henry II, ending in the Peace of Bautzen (1018). In the summer of 1018, in one of his expeditions, Bolesław I captured Kiev, where he installed his son-in-law Sviatopolk I as ruler. According to legend, Bolesław chipped his blade when striking Kiev's Golden Gate. In honour of this legend, the Szczerbiec ("Jagged Sword") would later become the coronation sword of Polish kings.

Bolesław is widely considered one of Poland's most accomplished Piast monarchs; he was an able strategist and statesman, who transformed Poland into an entity comparable to a hereditary monarchy. Bolesław conducted successful military campaigns to the west, south and east of his realm, and conquered territories in modern-day Slovakia, Moravia, Red Ruthenia, Meissen, Lusatia, and Bohemia. He established the "Prince's Law" and sponsored the construction of churches, monasteries, military forts as well as waterway infrastructure. He also introduced the first Polish monetary unit, the grzywna, divided into 240 denarii, and minted his own coinage.

== Early life ==
Bolesław was born in 966 or 967, the only known (Note: It has been assumed by many historians that Queen Gunhilda of Denmark, often incorrectly referred in modern historiography as "Świętosława", was another child of Mieszko I and Doubravka. However, research by Rafał Primke shows she was most likely born after Doubravka's death, and her mother was probably Oda of Haldensleben. Another proposed full-sibling of Boleslaus is Vladivoj, Duke of Bohemia, whose parentage has not been proven.) child of Mieszko I from his marriage to the Bohemian princess Dobrawa, known in Czech as Doubravka. He was named after his maternal grandfather, Boleslaus I, Duke of Bohemia.

His 11th century epitaph describes his father as "faithless" and his mother as "true-believing", suggesting that he was born before his father's baptism. Bolesław himself was baptised shortly after his birth.

Little is known about Bolesław's childhood. His epitaph recorded that he underwent the traditional hair-cutting ceremony at the age of seven and that a lock of his hair was sent to Rome, suggesting Mieszko wanted to place his son under the protection of the Holy See. Historian Tadeusz Manteuffel says that Bolesław needed that protection because his father had sent him to the court of Otto I, Holy Roman Emperor in token of his allegiance to the emperor. However, historian Marek Kazimierz Barański says the claim that Bolesław was sent as a hostage to the imperial court is disputed.

Bolesław's mother, Dobrawa, died in 977, and his widowed father married Oda of Haldensleben, who had previously been a nun. Around that time, Bolesław became the ruler of Lesser Poland, through it is not exactly clear in what circumstances. Jerzy Strzelczyk says that Bolesław received Lesser Poland from his father; Tadeusz Manteuffel states that he seized the province from his father with the local lords' support; while Henryk Łowmiański writes that his uncle, Boleslav II of Bohemia, granted the region to him.

== Accession and consolidation ==
Poland in the year 1000

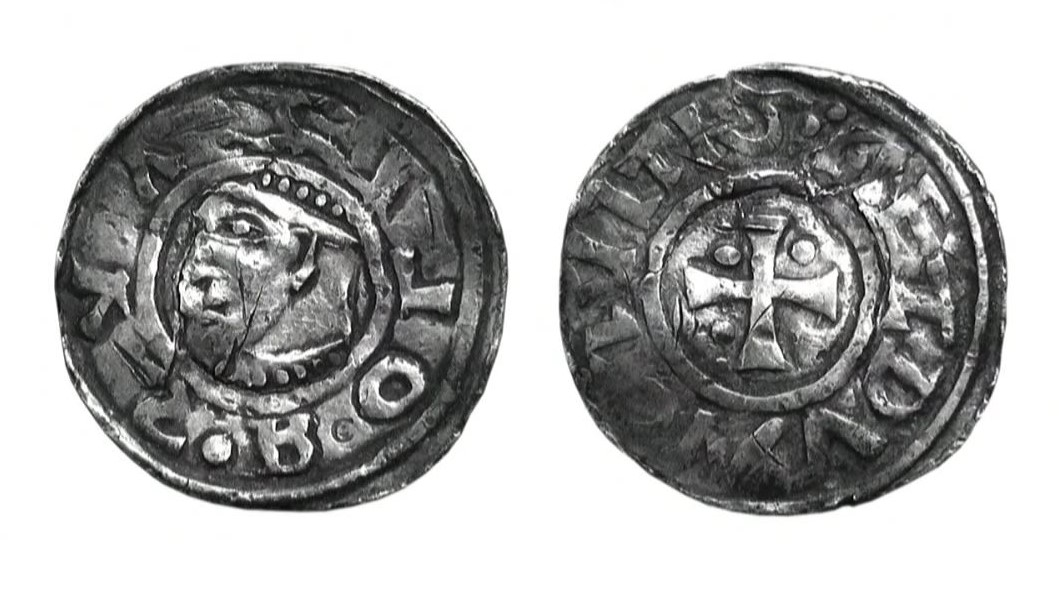
One of the earliest Polish coins featuring the supposed effigy of Bolesław with the inscription Bolizavs - gnezdvn civitas, c. 992–1000

Mieszko I died on 25 May 992. The contemporaneous Thietmar of Merseburg recorded that Mieszko left "his kingdom to be divided among many claimants", but Bolesław unified the country "with fox-like cunning" and expelled his stepmother and half-brothers from Poland. Two Polish lords, Odilien and Przibiwoj, who had supported Oda and her sons, were blinded on Bolesław's order. How long it took him to take control of all of Poland is a matter of dispute, but the consensus is within a few years. (Note: Historian Przemysław Wiszewski says that Bolesław had already taken control of the whole of Poland by 992; Pleszczyński writes that this only happened in the last months of 995.) According to chronicler Adam of Bremen, Boleslaw supported an attack in 992 or 993 by his sister's husband, King Erik of Sweden, on King Swein Forkbeard of Denmark.

Bolesław's first coins were issued around 995. One of them bore the inscription Vencievlavus, showing that he regarded his mother's uncle, Duke Wenceslaus I of Bohemia as the patron saint of Poland. Bolesław sent reinforcements to the Holy Roman Empire to fight against the Polabian Slavs in summer 992. Bolesław personally led a Polish army to assist the imperial troops in invading the land of the Abodrites or Veleti in 995. During the campaign, he met the young German monarch, Otto III.

Soběslav, the head of the Bohemian Slavník dynasty, also participated in the 995 campaign. Taking advantage of Soběslav's absence, Boleslav II of Bohemia invaded the Slavníks' domains and had most members of the family murdered. After learning of his kinsmen's fate, Soběslav settled in Poland. Bolesław gave shelter to him "for the sake of [Soběslav's] holy brother", Bishop Adalbert of Prague, according to the latter's hagiographies. Adalbert (known as Wojciech before his consecration) also came to Poland in 996, because Bolesław II "was quite amicably disposed towards him". Adalbert's hagiographies suggest that the bishop and Bolesław closely cooperated. In early 997, Adalbert left Poland to proselytise among the Prussians, who had been invading the eastern borderlands of Bolesław's realm. However, the pagans murdered him on 23 April 997. Bolesław ransomed Adalbert's remains, paying its weight in gold, and buried it in Gniezno. He sent parts of the martyr bishop's corpse to Emperor Otto III, who had been Adalbert's friend.

== Congress of Gniezno and its aftermath (999–1002) ==
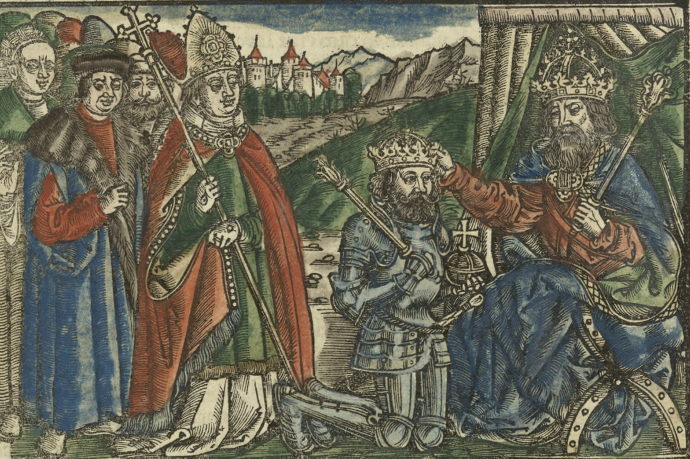
Otto III, Holy Roman Emperor, bestowing a crown upon Bolesław at the Congress of Gniezno. An imaginary depiction from Chronica Polonorum by Maciej Miechowita, c. 1521.

Emperor Otto III held a synod in Rome where Adalbert was canonised on the emperor's request on 29 June 999. Before 2 December 999, Adalbert's brother, Radim Gaudentius, was consecrated "Saint Adalbert's archbishop". Otto III made a pilgrimage to Saint Adalbert's tomb in Gniezno, accompanied by Pope Sylvester II's legate, Robert, in early 1000. Thietmar of Merseburg mentioned that it "would be impossible to believe or describe" how Bolesław received the emperor and conducted him to Gniezno. A century later, Gallus Anonymus added that "[m]arvelous and wonderful sights Bolesław set before the emperor when he arrived: the ranks first of the knights in all their variety, and then of the princes, lined up on a spacious plain like choirs, each separate unit set apart by the distinct and varied colors of its apparel, and no garment there was of inferior quality, but of the most precious stuff that might anywhere be found."

Bolesław took advantage of the emperor's pilgrimage. After the Emperor's visit to Gniezno, Poland started to develop into a sovereign state, in contrast with Bohemia, which remained a vassal state, incorporated in the Kingdom of Germany. Thietmar of Merseburg condemned Otto III for "making a lord out of a tributary" in reference to the relationship between the Emperor and Bolesław. Gallus Anonymus emphasised that Otto III declared Bolesław "his brother and partner" in the Holy Roman Empire, also calling Bolesław "a friend and ally of the Roman people". The same chronicler mentioned that Otto III "took the imperial diadem from his own head and laid it upon the head of Bolesław in pledge of friendship" in Gniezno. Bolesław also received "one of the nails from the cross of our Lord with the lance of Saint Maurice" from the Emperor.

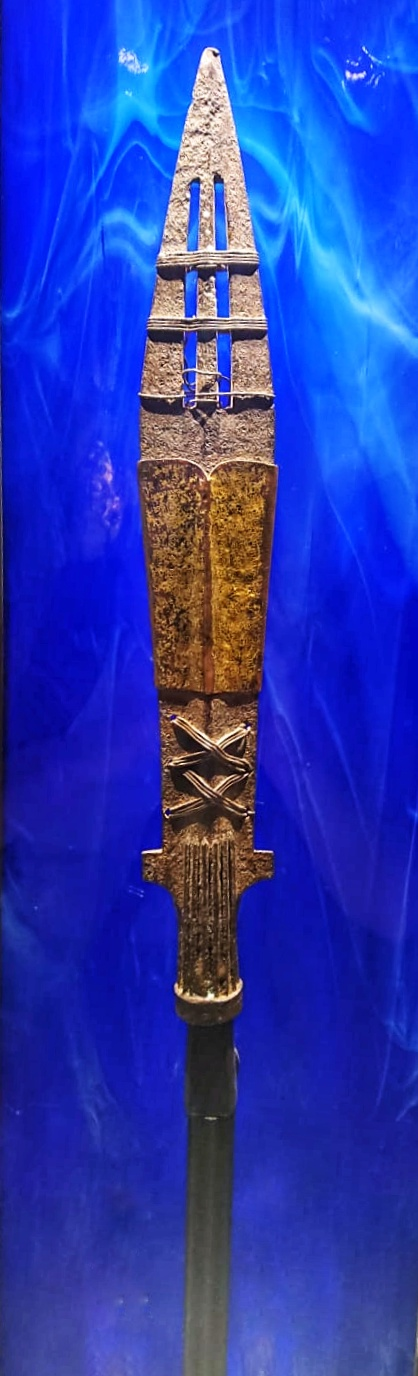
Bolesław's replica of the Holy Lance, Wawel Hill, Kraków

Gallus Anonymus claimed that Bolesław was "gloriously raised to kingship by the emperor" through these acts, but the Emperor's acts in Gniezno only symbolised that Bolesław received royal prerogatives, including the control of the Church in his realm. Radim Gaudentius was installed as the archbishop of the newly established Roman Catholic Archdiocese of Gniezno. At the same time, three suffragan bishoprics, subordinated to the see of Gniezno — the dioceses of Kołobrzeg, Kraków and Wrocław — were set up. Bolesław had promised that Poland would pay Peter's Pence to the Holy See to obtain the pope's sanction to the establishment of the new archdiocese. Unger, who had been the only prelate in Poland and was opposed to the creation of the archdiocese of Gniezno, was made bishop of Poznań, directly subordinated to the Holy See. However, Polish commoners only slowly adopted Christianity: Thietmar of Merseburg recorded that Bolesław forced his subjects with severe punishments to observe fasts and to refrain from adultery:

If anyone in this land should presume to abuse a foreign matron and thereby commit fornication, the act is immediately avenged through the following punishment. The guilty party is led on to the market bridge, and his scrotum is affixed to it with a nail. Then, after a sharp knife has been placed next to him, he is given the harsh choice between death and castration. Furthermore, anyone found to have eaten meat after Septuagesima is severely punished by having his teeth knocked out. The law of God, newly introduced in these regions, gains more strength from such acts of force than from any fast imposed by the bishops

— Thietmar of Merseburg: Chronicon

During the time the Emperor spent in Poland, Bolesław also showed off his affluence. At the end of the banquets, he "ordered the waiters and the cupbearers to gather the gold and silver vessels [...] from all three days' coursis, that is, the cups and goblets, the bowls and plates and the drinking-horns, and he presented them to the emperor as a toke of honor [...] [h]is servants were likewise told to collect the wall-hangings and the coverlets, the carpets and tablecloths and napkins and everything that had been provided for their needs and take them to the emperor's quarters", according to Gallus Anonymus. Thietmar of Merseburg recorded that Bolesław presented Otto III with a troop of "three hundred armoured warriors". Bolesław also gave Saint Adalbert's arm to the Emperor.

After the meeting, Bolesław escorted Otto III to Magdeburg in Germany, where "they celebrated Palm Sunday with great festivity" on 25 March 1000. A continuator of the chronicle of Adémar de Chabannes recorded, decades after the events, that Bolesław also accompanied Emperor Otto from Magdeburg to Aachen, where Otto III had Charlemagne's tomb reopened and gave Charlemagne's golden throne to Bolesław.

An illustrated Gospel, made for Otto III around 1000, depicted four women symbolising Roma, Gallia, Germania and Sclavinia as doing homage to the Emperor who sat on his throne. Historian Alexis P. Vlasto writes that "Sclavinia" referred to Poland, proving that it was regarded as one of the Christian realms subjected to the Holy Roman Empire in accordance with Otto III's idea of Renovatio imperii — the renewal of the Roman Empire based on a federal concept. Within that framework, Poland, along with Hungary, was upgraded to an eastern foederatus of the Holy Roman Empire, according to historian Jerzy Strzelczyk.

Coins struck for Bolesław shortly after his meeting with the emperor bore the inscription Gnezdun Civitas, showing that he regarded Gniezno as his capital. The name of Poland was also recorded on the same coins, referring to the Princes Polonie [sic]. The title princeps was almost exclusively used in Italy around that time, suggesting that it also represented the Emperor's idea of the renewal of the Roman Empire. However, Otto's premature death on 23 January 1002 put an end to his ambitious plans. The contemporaneous Bruno of Querfurt stated that "nobody lamented" the 22-year-old emperor's "death with greater grief than Bolesław".

In 1000 Bolesław issued a law prohibiting hunting beavers and created an office called "Bobrowniczy" whose task was to enforce prince's ordinances.

== Expansion (1002–1018) ==
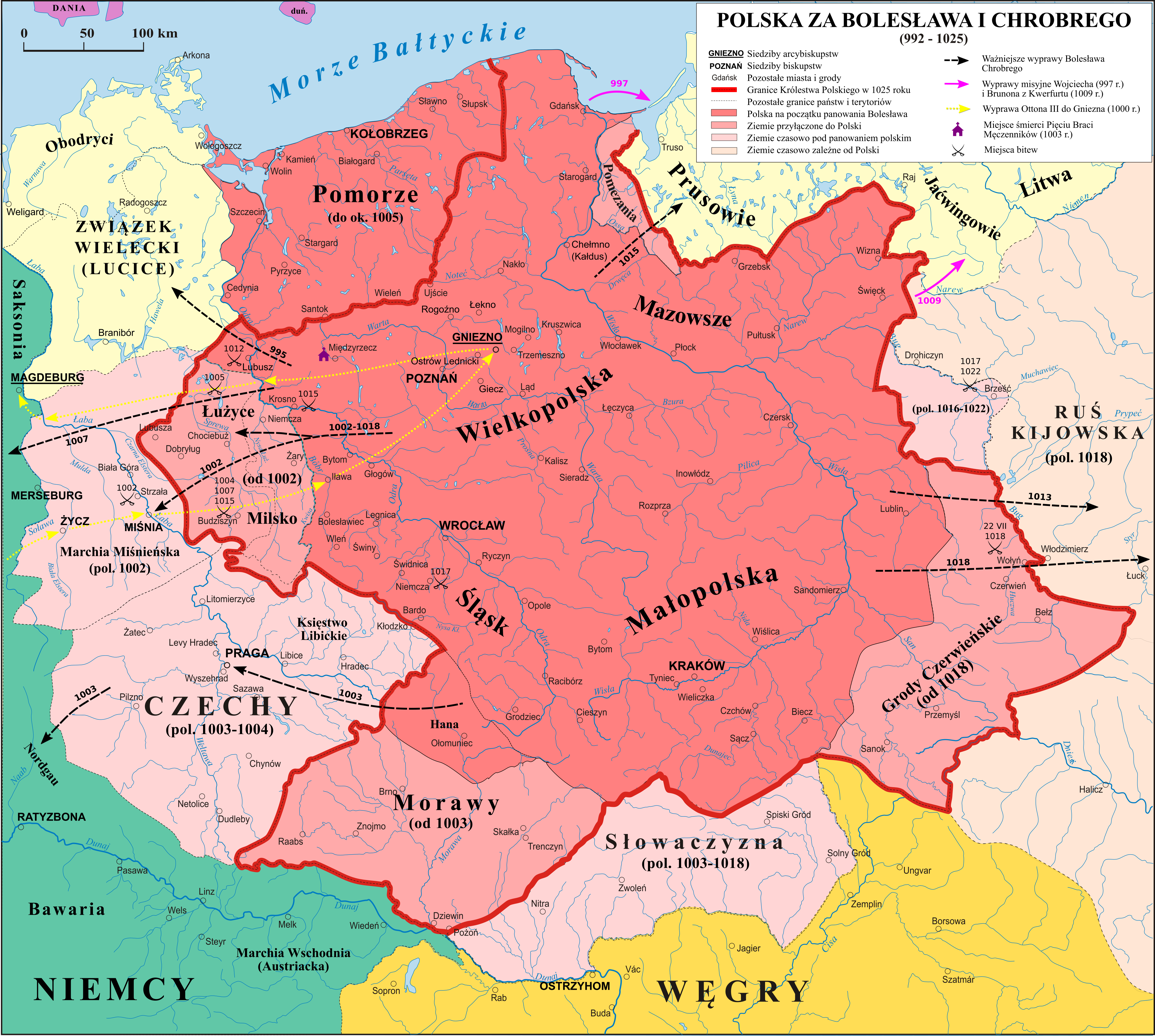
Poland during the reign of Bolesław the Brave

=== The German succession crisis ===
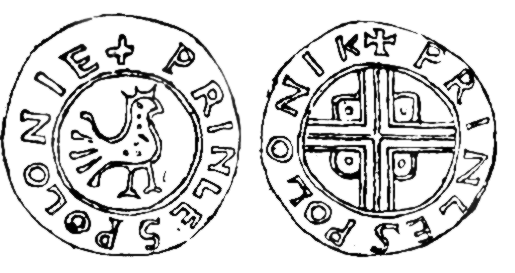
Bolesław's denarius with the inscription Princes Polonie

After Otto III's death in January 1002, three candidates were competing with each other for the German crown. One of them, Duke Henry IV of Bavaria, promised the Margraviate of Meissen to Bolesław in exchange for his assistance against Eckard I, Margrave of Meissen who was the most powerful contender. However, Eckard was murdered on 30 April 1002, which enabled Henry of Bavaria to defeat his last opponent, Herman II, Duke of Swabia. Fearing that Henry II would side with elements in the German Church hierarchy which were unfavourable towards Poland, and taking advantage of the chaos that followed Margrave Eckard's death and Henry of Bavaria's conflict with Henry of Schweinfurt, Bolesław invaded Lusatia and Meissen. He seized the march of count Gero II as far as the river Elbe, and also Bautzen, Strehla and Meissen, with additional territories up to White Elster river, thus advancing deep into Sorbian lands. At the end of July, he participated at a meeting of the Saxon lords where Henry of Bavaria, who had meanwhile been crowned king of Germany, only confirmed Bolesław's possession of Lusatia, and granted Meissen to Margrave Eckard's brother, Gunzelin, and Strehla to Eckard's oldest son, Herman. The relationship between King Henry and Bolesław became tense after assassins tried to murder Bolesław in Merseburg, because he accused the king of conspiracy against him. In retaliation, he seized and burned Strehla and took the inhabitants of the town into captivity.

=== Bohemia and relations with Henry II ===
Duke Boleslaus III of Bohemia was dethroned and the Bohemian lords made Vladivoj, who had earlier fled to Poland, duke in 1002. The Czech historian Dušan Třeštík writes that Vladivoj seized the Bohemian throne with Bolesław's assistance. After Vladivoj died in 1003, Bolesław invaded Bohemia and restored Boleslaus III, who had many Bohemian noblemen murdered. The Bohemian lords who survived the massacre "secretly sent representatives" to Bolesław, asking "him to rescue them from fear of the future", according to Thietmar of Merseburg. Bolesław invaded Bohemia and had Boleslaus III blinded. He entered Prague in March 1003, where the Bohemian lords proclaimed him duke. King Henry sent his envoys to Prague, demanding that Bolesław take an oath of loyalty and pay tribute to him, but Bolesław refused to obey. He also allied himself with the king's opponents, including Henry of Schweinfurt, to whom he sent reinforcements. King Henry defeated Henry of Schweinfurt, forcing him to flee to Bohemia in August 1003. Bolesław invaded the Margraviate of Meissen, but Margrave Gunzelin refused to surrender his capital. It is also likely that Polish forces took control of Moravia and the northern parts of the Kingdom of Hungary (present-day mostly Slovakia) in 1003 as well. The proper conquest date of the Hungarian territories is 1003 or 1015, and this area stayed a part of Poland until 1018.

=== Renewed fighting and negotiations ===
King Henry allied himself with the pagan Lutici, and broke into Lusatia in February 1004, but heavy snows forced him to withdraw. He invaded Bohemia in August 1004, taking the oldest brother of the blinded Boleslaus III of Bohemia, Jaromír, with him. The Bohemians rose up in open rebellion and murdered the Polish garrisons in the major towns. Bolesław left Prague without resistance, and King Henry made Jaromír duke of Bohemia on 8 September. Bolesław's ally Soběslav died in this campaign.

During the next part of the offensive, King Henry retook Meissen and in 1005, his army advanced as far into Poland as the city of Poznań, where a peace treaty was signed. According to the peace treaty Bolesław lost Lusatia and Meissen and likely gave up his claim to the Bohemian throne. Also in 1005, a pagan rebellion in Pomerania overturned Bolesław's rule and resulted in the destruction of the newly established local bishopric.

In 1007, after learning about Bolesław's efforts to gain allies among Saxon nobles and giving refuge to the deposed duke of Bohemia, Oldřich, King Henry denounced the Peace of Poznań, which caused Bolesław's attack on the Archbishopric of Magdeburg as well as the re-occupation of the marches of Lusatia, though he stopped short of retaking Meissen. The German counter-offensive began three years later (previously, Henry was occupied with rebellion in Flanders), in 1010, but it was of no significant consequence. In 1012, another ineffective campaign by archbishop Walthard of Magdeburg was launched, as he died during that campaign and, consequently, his forces returned home. Later that year, Bolesław once again invaded Lusatia. Bolesław's forces pillaged and burned the city of Lubusz (Lebus). In 1013, a peace accord was signed at Merseburg.

=== The settlement at Merseburg ===
As part of the treaty, Bolesław paid homage to King Henry for the March of Lusatia (including the town of Bautzen) and Sorbian Meissen as fiefs. A marriage of Bolesław's son Mieszko with Richeza of Lotharingia, daughter of the Count Palatine Ezzo of Lotharingia and granddaughter of Emperor Otto II, was also performed. During the brief period of peace on the western frontier that followed, Bolesław took part in a short campaign in the east, towards the Kievan Rus' territories.

=== Renewed war with the empire ===
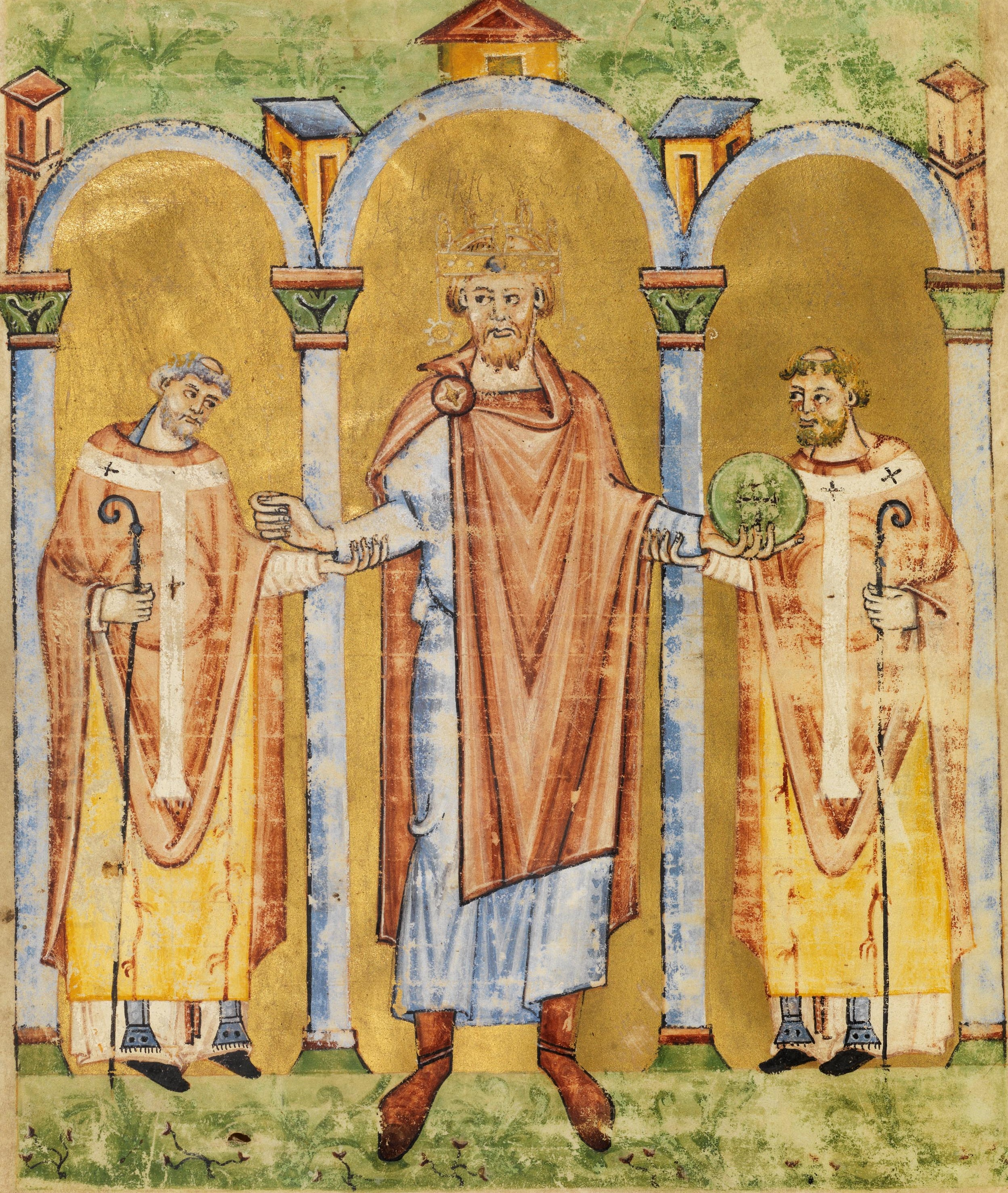
Henry II, Holy Roman Emperor depicted in the Seeon Evangeliary, c. 1014–1024

In 1014, Bolesław sent his son Mieszko to Bohemia in order to form an alliance with Duke Oldrich against Henry, by then crowned emperor. Oldrich imprisoned Mieszko and turned him over to Henry, who, however, released him in a gesture of good will after being pressured by Saxon nobles. Bolesław nonetheless refused to aid the emperor militarily in his Italian expedition. This led to imperial intervention in Poland and so in 1015 a war erupted once again. The war started out well for the emperor, as he was able to defeat the Polish forces at the Battle of Ciani. Once the imperial forces crossed the river Oder, Bolesław sent a detachment of Moravian knights in a diversionary attack against the Eastern March of the empire. Soon after, the imperial army, having suffered a defeat near the Bóbr marshes, retreated from Poland without any permanent gains. After this event, Bolesław's forces took the initiative. Margrave Gero II of Meissen was defeated and killed during a clash with the Polish forces in late 1015. In 1015 and 1017, Bolesław I attacked the Eastern March and was defeated twice by Henry the Strong and his forces.

Later that year, Bolesław's son Mieszko was sent to plunder Meissen. His attempt at conquering the city, however, failed. In 1017, Bolesław defeated Duke Henry V of Bavaria. In that same year, supported by his Slavic allies, Emperor Henry once again invaded Poland, albeit once again to very little effect. He did besiege the cities of Głogów and Niemcza, but was unable to conquer them. The imperial forces once again were forced to retreat, suffering significant losses. Taking advantage of the involvement of Czech troops, Bolesław ordered his son to invade Bohemia, where Mieszko met very little resistance.

=== The Peace of Bautzen ===
On 30 January 1018, the Peace of Bautzen was signed. The Polish ruler was able to keep the contested marches of Lusatia and Sorbian Meissen not as fiefs, but as a part of Polish territory, and also received military aid in his expedition against Rus'. Also, Bolesław (then a widower) strengthened his dynastic bonds with the German nobility through his marriage with Oda, daughter of Margrave Eckard I of Meissen. The wedding took place four days later, on 3 February in the castle of Cziczani (also Sciciani, at the site of either modern Groß-Seitschen or Zützen).

== War in Kiev (1018) ==
Bolesław organised his first expedition east, to support his son-in-law Sviatopolk I of Kiev, in 1013, but the decisive engagements were to take place in 1018 after the Peace of Bautzen was already signed. At the request of Sviatopolk I, in what became known as the Kiev Expedition of 1018, the Polish duke sent an expedition to Kievan Rus' with an army of 2,000–5,000 Polish warriors, in addition to Thietmar's reported 1,000 Pechenegs, 300 German knights, and 500 Hungarian mercenaries. After collecting his forces during June, Bolesław led his troops to the border in July and on 23 July at the banks of the Bug River, near Wołyń, he defeated the forces of Yaroslav the Wise, Prince of Kiev, in what became known as the Battle of the River Bug. All primary sources agree that the Polish prince was victorious in battle. Yaroslav retreated north to Novgorod, opening the road to Kiev. The city, which suffered from fires caused by the Pecheneg siege, surrendered upon seeing the main Polish force on 14 August. The entering army, led by Bolesław, was ceremonially welcomed by the local archbishop and the family of Vladimir I of Kiev. According to popular legend Bolesław notched his sword (Szczerbiec) hitting the Golden Gate of Kiev. Although Sviatopolk lost the throne soon afterwards and lost his life the following year, during this campaign, Poland re-annexed the Red Strongholds, later called Red Ruthenia, lost by Bolesław's father in 981.

== Last years (1019–1025) ==
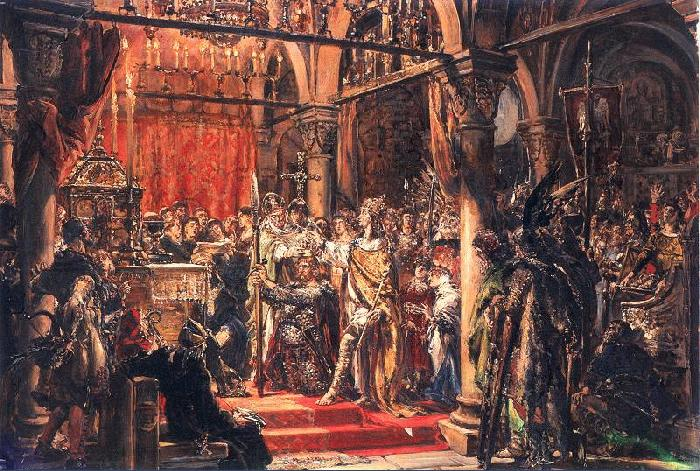
Coronation of the First King, as imagined by Jan Matejko

In 1018, Bolesław attempted to establish diplomatic relations with the Byzantines, although it is unclear whether they responded.

Historians dispute the exact date of Bolesław's coronation. The year 1025 is most widely accepted by scholars, though the year 1000 is also likely. According to an epitaph, the crowning took place when Otto bestowed upon Bolesław royal regalia at the Congress of Gniezno. However, independent German sources confirmed that after Henry II's death in 1024, Bolesław took advantage of the interregnum in Germany and crowned himself king in 1025. It is generally assumed that the coronation took place on Easter Sunday 27 March 1025. However, Tadeusz Wojciechowski believes that the coronation took place prior to that, on 24 December 1024. The basis for this assertion is that the coronations of kings were usually held during religious festivities. The exact place of the coronation is also highly debated, with the cathedrals of Gniezno or Poznań being the most probable locations. Poland was thereafter raised to the rank of a kingdom before its neighbour, Bohemia.

Wipo of Burgundy in his chronicle describes the event:

[In 1025] Boleslaus [of the Slavic nation], duke of the Poles, took for himself in injury to King Conrad the regal insignia and the royal name. Death swiftly killed his temerity.

— Wipo: The Deeds of Conrad II

It is widely believed that Bolesław had to receive permission for his coronation from the newly elected Pope John XIX. John was known to be corrupt, and it is likely that consent was or may have been obtained through bribes. However, Rome also hoped for a potential alliance to defend itself from the Byzantine Emperor Basil II, who launched a military expedition to recover the island of Sicily and could subsequently threaten the Papal States from the south. Stanisław Zakrzewski put forward the theory that the coronation had the tacit consent of Conrad II and that the pope only confirmed that fact. That is corroborated by Conrad's confirmation of the royal title to Mieszko II, his agreement with the counts of Tusculum and the papal interactions with Conrad and Bolesław.

== Death and burial ==
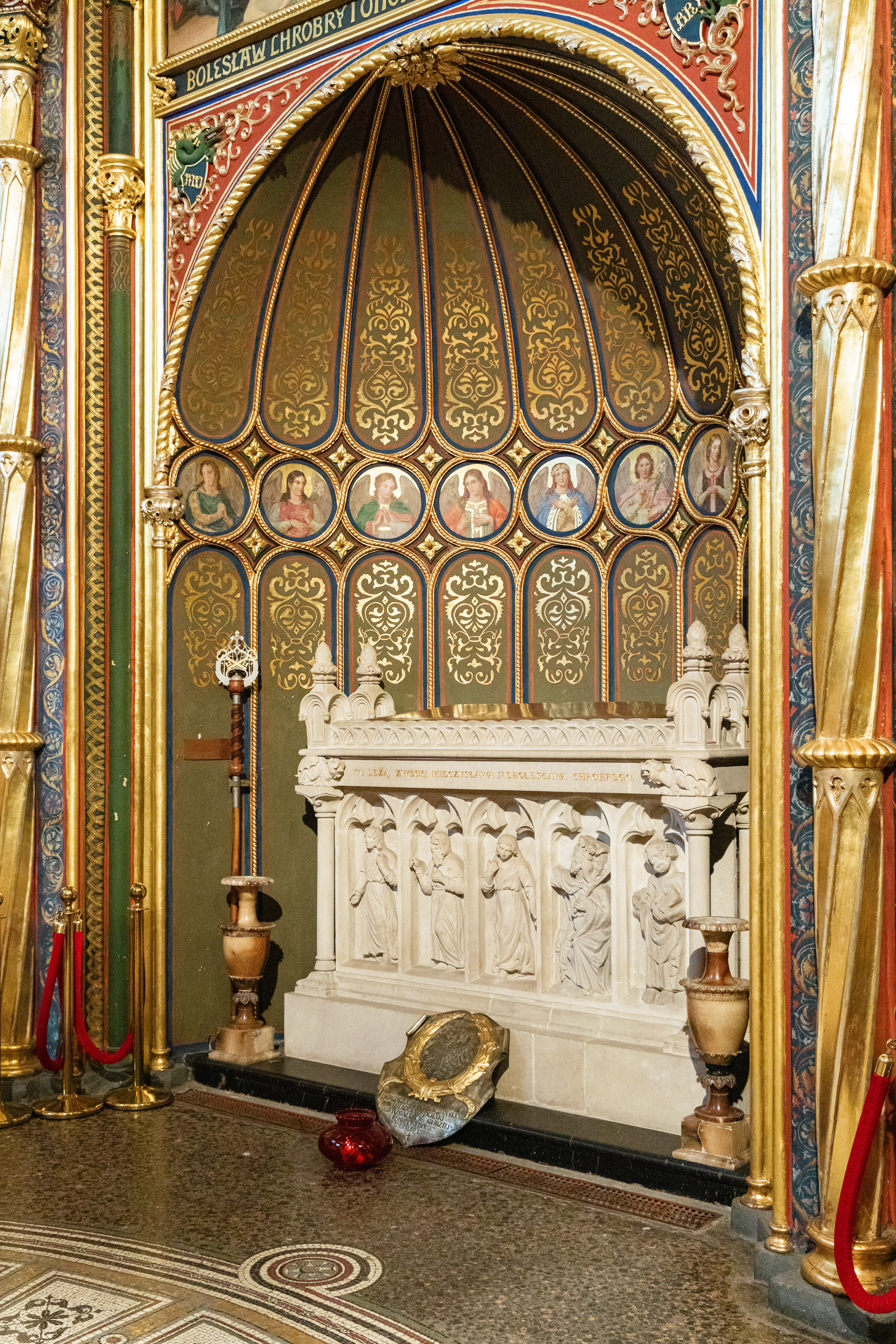
Tomb of Bolesław and his father, Mieszko, inside the Golden Chapel at Poznań Cathedral

According to Cosmas of Prague, Bolesław I died shortly after his coronation on 17 June 1025. Already in advanced age for the time, the true cause of death is unknown and remains a matter of speculation. Chronicler Jan Długosz (and followed by modern historians and archaeologists) writes that Bolesław was laid to rest at the Archcathedral Basilica of St. Peter and St. Paul in Poznań. In the 14th century, Casimir III the Great reportedly ordered the construction of a new, presumably Gothic, sarcophagus to which he transferred Bolesław's remains.

The medieval sarcophagus was partially damaged on 30 September 1772 during a fire and completely destroyed in 1790 due to the collapse of the southern tower. Bolesław's remains were subsequently excavated from the rubble and moved to the cathedral's chapter house. Three bone fragments were donated to Tadeusz Czacki in 1801, at his request. Czacki, a notable Polish historian, pedagogue, and numismatist, placed one of the bone fragments in his ancestral mausoleum in Poryck (now Pavlivka) in the Volhynia region; the other two were given to Princess Izabela Flemming Czartoryska, who placed them in her recently founded Czartoryski Museum in Puławy.

After many historical twists, the burial place of Bolesław I ultimately remained at Poznań Cathedral, in the Golden Chapel. The content of his epitaph is known to historians. It is Bolesław's epitaph, which, in part, came from the original tombstone, that is one of the first sources (dated to the period immediately after Bolesław's death, probably during the reign of Mieszko II) that gave the King his widely known nickname of "Brave" (Polish: Chrobry). Later, Gallus Anonymus, in Chapter 6 of his Gesta principum Polonorum, named the Polish ruler as Bolezlavus qui dicebatur Gloriosus seu Chrabri.

== Family ==
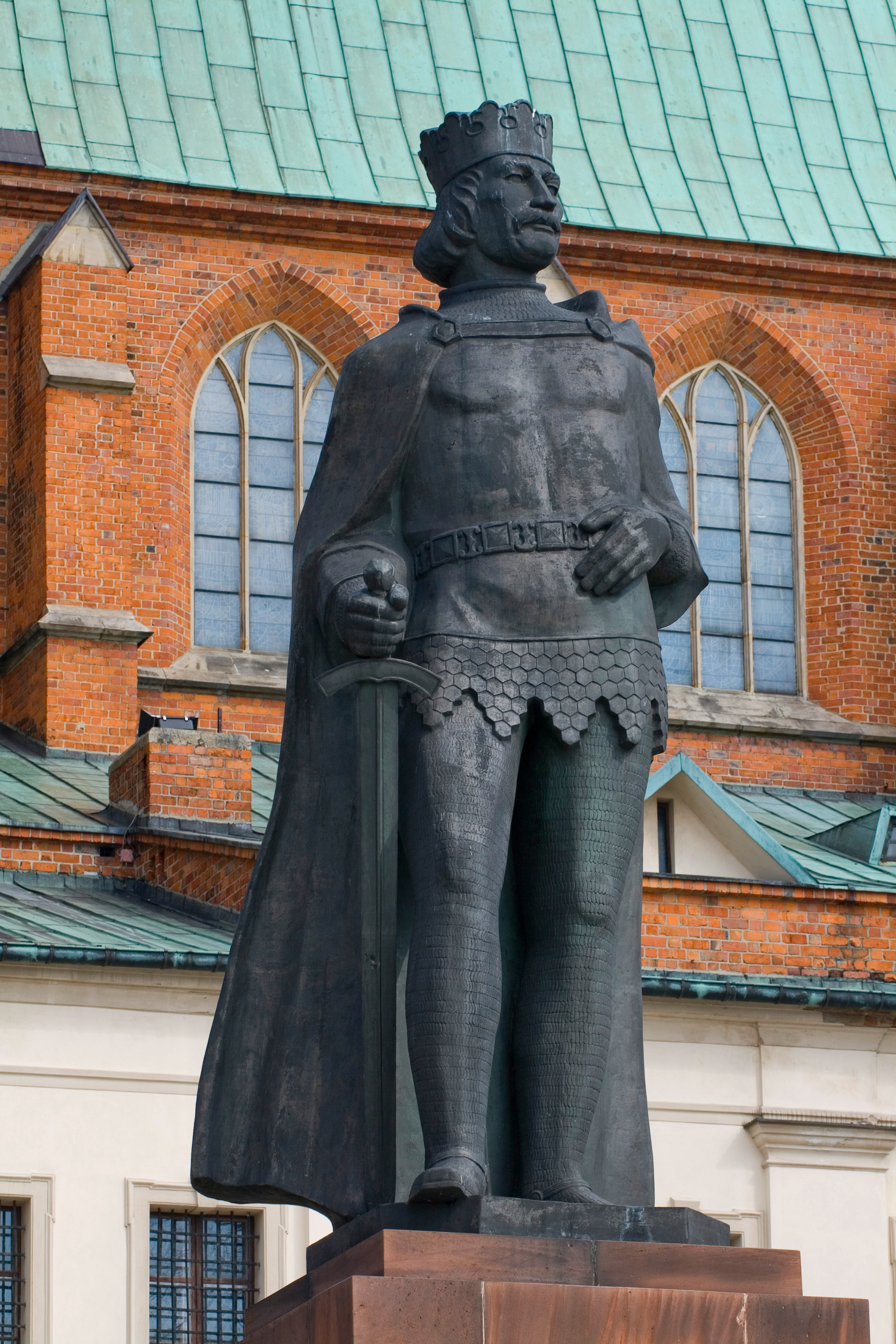
Monument to Bolesław the Brave in Gniezno, created by Marcin Rożek in 1925. Destroyed in 1939 and reconstructed in 1985 by Jerzy Sobociński.

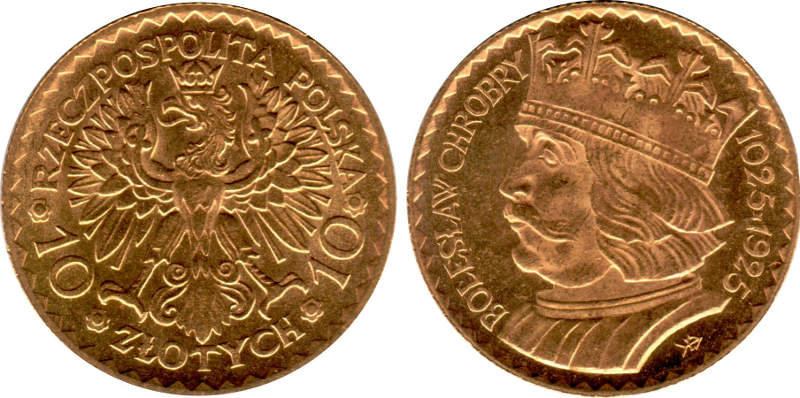
10-złotych coin with Bolesław Chrobry (1925)

The contemporaneous Thietmar of Merseburg recorded Bolesław's marriages, also mentioning his children. Bolesław's first wife was a daughter of Rikdag, Margrave of Meissen. Historian Manteuffel says that the marriage was arranged in the early 980s by Mieszko I, who wanted to strengthen his links with the Saxon lords and to enable his son to succeed Rikdag in Meissen. Bolesław "later sent her away", according to Thietmar's Chronicon. Historian Marek Kazimierz Barański writes that Bolesław repudiated his first wife after her father's death in 985 which left the marriage without any political value.

Bolesław "took a Hungarian woman" as his second wife. Some historians identify her as a daughter of the Hungarian ruler Géza, but this theory has not been universally accepted. She gave birth to a son, Bezprym, but Bolesław repudiated her.

Bolesław's third wife, Emnilda, was "a daughter of the venerable lord, Dobromir". Her father was a West Slavic or Lechitic prince, either a local ruler from present-day Brandenburg who was closely related to the imperial Liudolfing dynasty, or the last independent prince of the Vistulans, before their incorporation into Poland. Wiszewski dates the marriage of Bolesław and Emnilda to 988. Emnilda exerted a beneficial influence on Bolesław, reforming "her husband's unstable character", according to Thietmar of Merseburg's report. Bolesław's and Emnilda's oldest (unnamed) daughter "was an abbess" of an unidentified abbey. Their second daughter Regelinda, who was born in 989, was given in marriage to Herman I, Margrave of Meissen in 1002 or 1003. Mieszko II Lambert who was born in 990 was Bolesław's favorite son and successor. The name of Bolesław's and Emnilda's third daughter, who was born in 995, is unknown; she married Sviatopolk I of Kiev between 1005 and 1012. Bolesław's youngest son, Otto, was born in 1000.

Bolesław's fourth marriage, from 1018 until his death, was to Oda (c. 995 – 1025), daughter of Margrave Eckard I of Meissen. They had a daughter, Matilda (c. 1018–1036), betrothed (or married) on 18 May 1035 to Otto of Schweinfurt.

Predslava, a daughter of Vladimir the Great and Rogneda, whom, along with her sister Mstislava, he had taken from Kiev in 1018, was his concubine.

Marriages and Issue:

Oda/Hunilda?, daughter of Rikdag

Unnamed Hungarian (wife of Boleslaus the Brave):

1. Bezprym (c. 986–1032) – became Duke of Poland

Emnilda, daughter of Dobromir:

1. Unknown abbess of an unidentified abbey
2. Regelinda (c. 989 – 21 March aft. 1014), married Herman I, Margrave of Meissen, becoming Margravine of Meissen
3. Mieszko II Lambert (c. 990 – 10/11 May 1034), became king and subsequent to his dethronement, regained power as duke of Poland
4. Unknown daughter, married Grand Prince Sviatopolk I of Kiev and became Grand Princess of Kiev
5. Otto Bolesławowic (c. 1000–1033)

Oda of Meissen

1. Matilda (c. 1018–1036), betrothed to Otto of Schweinfurt but the marriage was rejected.

== Gallery ==
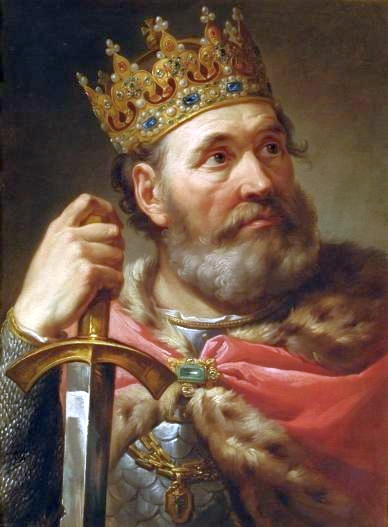
Portrait of Boleslaus I the Brave by Marcello Baciarelli, c. 1770

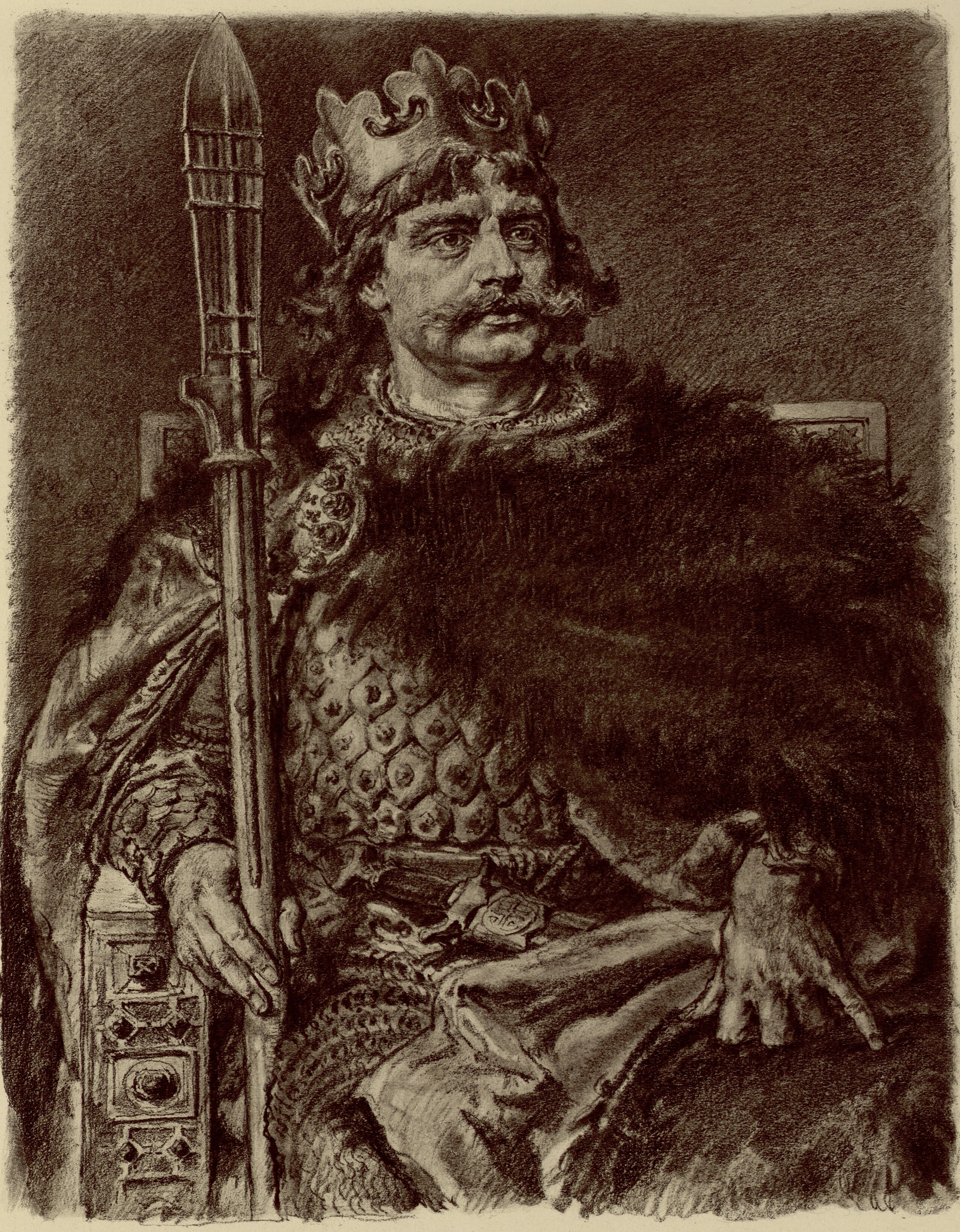
Boleslaus I of Poland, a drawing by Jan Matejko, c. 1890

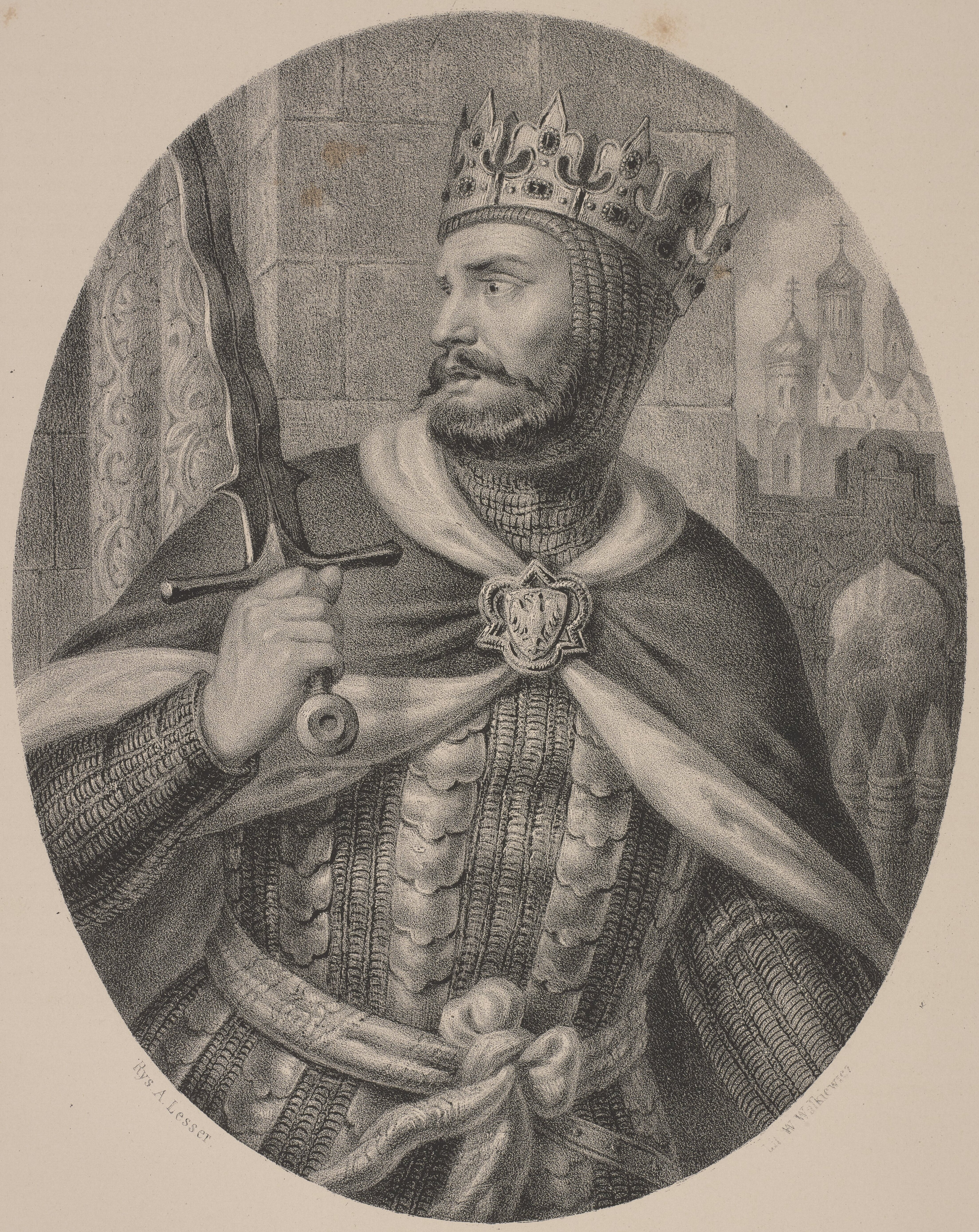
Boleslaus I the Brave by Aleksander Lesser

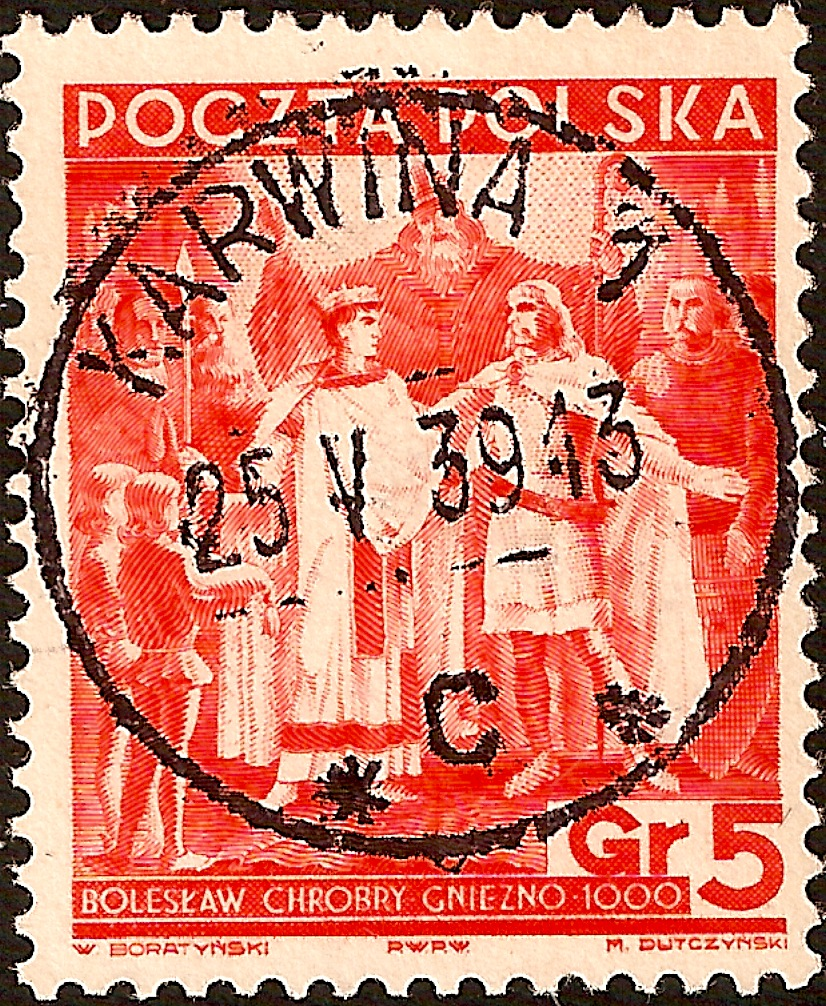
Boleslaus on a postage stamp, 1938

== See also ==
- Bolesław Chrobry Tournament – speedway event named after the King
- Castle Chrobry in Szprotawa
- Crown of Bolesław I the Brave
- History of Poland (966–1385)
- Siege of Lubusz

== Bibliography ==
=== Primary sources ===
- "Life of the Five Brethren by Bruno of Querfurt (Translated by Marina Miladinov)" (2013). In Saints of the Christianization Age of Central Europe (Tenth-Eleventh Centuries) (Edited by Gábor Klaniczay, translated by Cristian Gaşpar and Marina Miladinov, with an introductory essay by Ian Wood) [Central European Medieval Texts, Volume 6]. Central European University Press. pp. 183–314. ISBN 978-615-5225-20-8.
- "Life of Saint Adalbert Bishop of Prague and Martyr (Translated by Cristian Gaşpar)" (2013). In Saints of the Christianization Age of Central Europe (Tenth-Eleventh Centuries) (Edited by Gábor Klaniczay, translated by Cristian Gaşpar and Marina Miladinov, with an introductory essay by Ian Wood) [Central European Medieval Texts, Volume 6]. Central European University Press. pp. 77–182. ISBN 978-615-5225-20-8.
- Trillmich, Werner, ed. (1957). Thietmar von Merseburg: Chronik. Darmstadt: Wissenschaftliche Buchgesellschaft.
- Warner, David A., ed. (2001). Ottonian Germany: The Chronicon of Thietmar of Merseburg. Manchester and New York: Manchester University Press.
- "The Deeds of Conrad II (Wipo)" (2000). In Imperial Lives & Letters of the Eleventh Century (Translated by Theodor E. Mommsen and Karl F. Morrison, with a historical introduction and new suggested readings by Karl F. Morrison, edited by Robert L. Benson). Columbia University Press. pp. 52–100. ISBN 978-0-231-12121-7.
- The Deeds of the Princes of the Poles (Translated and annotated by Paul W. Knoll and Frank Schaer with a preface by Thomas N. Bisson) (2003). CEU Press. ISBN 963-9241-40-7.

=== Secondary sources ===
- Bachrach, David S. (2020). "The Eastern Campaigns of King Henry II of Germany, 1003–1017". Journal of Medieval Military History. 18: 1–36.
- Barański, Marek Kazimierz (2008). Dynastia Piastów w Polsce [The Piast Dynasty in Poland] (in Polish). Wydawnictwo Naukowe PWN. ISBN 978-83-01-14816-4.
- Barford, P. M. (2001). The Early Slavs: Culture and Society in Early Medieval Eastern Europe. Cornell University Press. ISBN 0-8014-3977-9.
- Berend, Nora; Urbańczyk, Przemysław; Wiszewski, Przemysław (2013). Central Europe in the High Middle Ages: Bohemia, Hungary and Poland, c. 900–c. 1300. Cambridge University Press. ISBN 978-0-521-78156-5.
- Curta, Florin (2019). Eastern Europe in the Middle Ages (500–1300). Leiden and Boston: Brill Publishers.
- Davies, Norman (2005). God's Playground: A History of Poland, Volume I: The Origins to 1795 (Revised Edition). Columbia University Press. ISBN 978-0-231-12817-9.
- Grabski, Andrzej Feliks (1964). Bolesław Chrobry: zarys dziejów politycznych i wojskowych (in Polish). Warszawa (Warsaw): Wyd. Minist. Obrony Narodowej. OCLC 313427345.
- Manteuffel, Tadeusz (1982). The Formation of the Polish State: The Period of Ducal Rule, 963–1194 (Translated and with an Introduction by Andrew Gorski). Wayne State University Press. ISBN 0-8143-1682-4.
- Nungovitch, Petro Andreas (2019). Here All Is Poland: A Pantheonic History of Wawel, 1787–2010. Lanham: Lexington Books. ISBN 978-1-498-56913-2.
- Pleszczyński, Andrzej (2001). "Poland as an ally of the Holy Ottonian Empire". In Urbańczyk, Przemysław (ed.). Europe around the Year 1000. Wydawnictwo DIG. pp. 409–425. ISBN 83-7181-211-6.
- Reuter, Timothy (2013) [1991]. Germany in the Early Middle Ages c. 800–1056. London and New York: Routledge.
- Rosik, Stanisław (2001). Bolesław Chrobry i jego czasy [Bolesław the Brave and his Times] (in Polish). Wydawnictwo Dolnośląskie. ISBN 978-83-70-23888-9.
- Sawyer, Peter (2004). "Swein [Sveinn Haraldsson, Sveinn Tjúguskegg, Swein Forkbeard] (d. 1014)". Oxford Dictionary of National Biography. Oxford University Press. doi:10.1093/ref:odnb/26830. (subscription, Wikipedia Library access or UK public library membership required)
- Schwarzenberg, Karl; Hucek, Miroslav (1994). The Prague Castle and Its Treasures. New York: Vendome Press. ISBN 978-0-865-65952-0.
- Sochacki, Jarosław (2003). Stosunki publicznoprawne między państwem polskim a Cesarstwem Rzymskim w latach 963–1102 (in Polish). Słupsk: Wydawnictwo Pomorskiej Akademii Pedagogicznej. ISBN 978-8-388-73171-6.
- Strzelczyk, Jerzy (2003). "Die Anfänge Polens und Deutschlands". In Lawaty, Andreas; Orłowski, Hubert (eds.). Deutsche und Polen: Geschichte-Kultur-Politik (in German). C. H. Beck. pp. 16–25. ISBN 978-3-406-49436-9.
- Thompson, James Westfall (2012). "Medieval German expansion in Bohemia and Poland". In Berend, Nóra (ed.). The Expansion of Central Europe in the Middle Ages. Ashgate Variorum. pp. 1–38. ISBN 978-1-4094-2245-7.
- Třeštík, Dušan (2011). "Great Moravia and the beginnings of the state (9th and 10th centuries)". In Pánek, Jaroslav; Tůma, Oldřich (eds.). A History of the Czech Lands. Charles University. pp. 65–79. ISBN 978-80-246-1645-2.
- Urbańczyk, Przemysław (2017). Bolesław Chrobry – lew ryczący (in Polish). Toruń: Wydawnictwo Naukowe Uniwersytetu Mikołaja Kopernika. ISBN 978-8-323-13886-0.
- Vlasto, Alexis P. (1970). The Entry of the Slavs into Christendom: An Introduction to the Medieval History of the Slavs. Cambridge: Cambridge University Press.
- Wiszewski, Przemysław (2010). Domus Bolezlai: Values and Social Identity in Dynastic Traditions of Medieval Poland (c. 966–1138). Brill Publishers. ISBN 978-90-04-18142-7.
- Wolverton, Lisa (2009). The Chronicle of the Czechs. Washington, D.C.: The Catholic University of America Press. ISBN 978-0-813-21713-0.
- Zamoyski, Adam (1987). The Polish Way: A Thousand-year History of the Poles and their Culture. Hippocrene Books. ISBN 0-7818-0200-8.

Bolesław I the Brave Piast Dynasty Born: 966 or 967 Died: 17 June 1025
Preceded by Mieszko I	Duke of the Polans; 992 – 1025	Succeeded by Mieszko II Lambert
New title	King of Poland; 1025	Succeeded by Mieszko II Lambert
Preceded by Odo II	Margrave of Saxon Eastern March; 1002 – 1025	Succeeded by Mieszko II Lambert
Preceded by Vladivoj	Duke of Bohemia; 1003 – 1004	Succeeded by Jaromír
