= Siege of Lubusz =

1012 battle part of the German-Polish War (1003–1018)

- Part of Polish–German Wars (1003–1018)
| Date | 19–20 August 1012 |
| Location | Lubusz, modern-day Brandenburg, Germany |
| Result | Polish victory |

Belligerents
| Duchy of Poland | Holy Roman Empire |

Commanders and leaders
| Bolesław I | Henry II |

Strength
| 1,000 | |

Casualties and losses
| 500 (heavily exaggerated) | |

The siege of Lubusz was a siege part of the German–Polish War that took place from 19 to 20 August 1012. It involved the Duchy of Poland led by Bolesław I the Brave against the Holy Roman Empire led by Henry II. It resulted in a Polish victory.

== Battle ==
The Germans stood on the other side of the Elbe, which had flooded from the west, making them unable to come to the aid of the besieged. Bolesław the Brave then conquered the city.

The town had a crew of up to 1,000 people. 500 Poles (according to Bishop Thietmar's chronicle, heavily exaggerated) (Note: Thietmar heavily disliked the Poles and their leaders (as seen in the reference right before this), therefore he decided to exaggerate Polish casualties.) died as a result of the siege, but many Germans died and the three crew commanders were captured.

== Aftermath ==
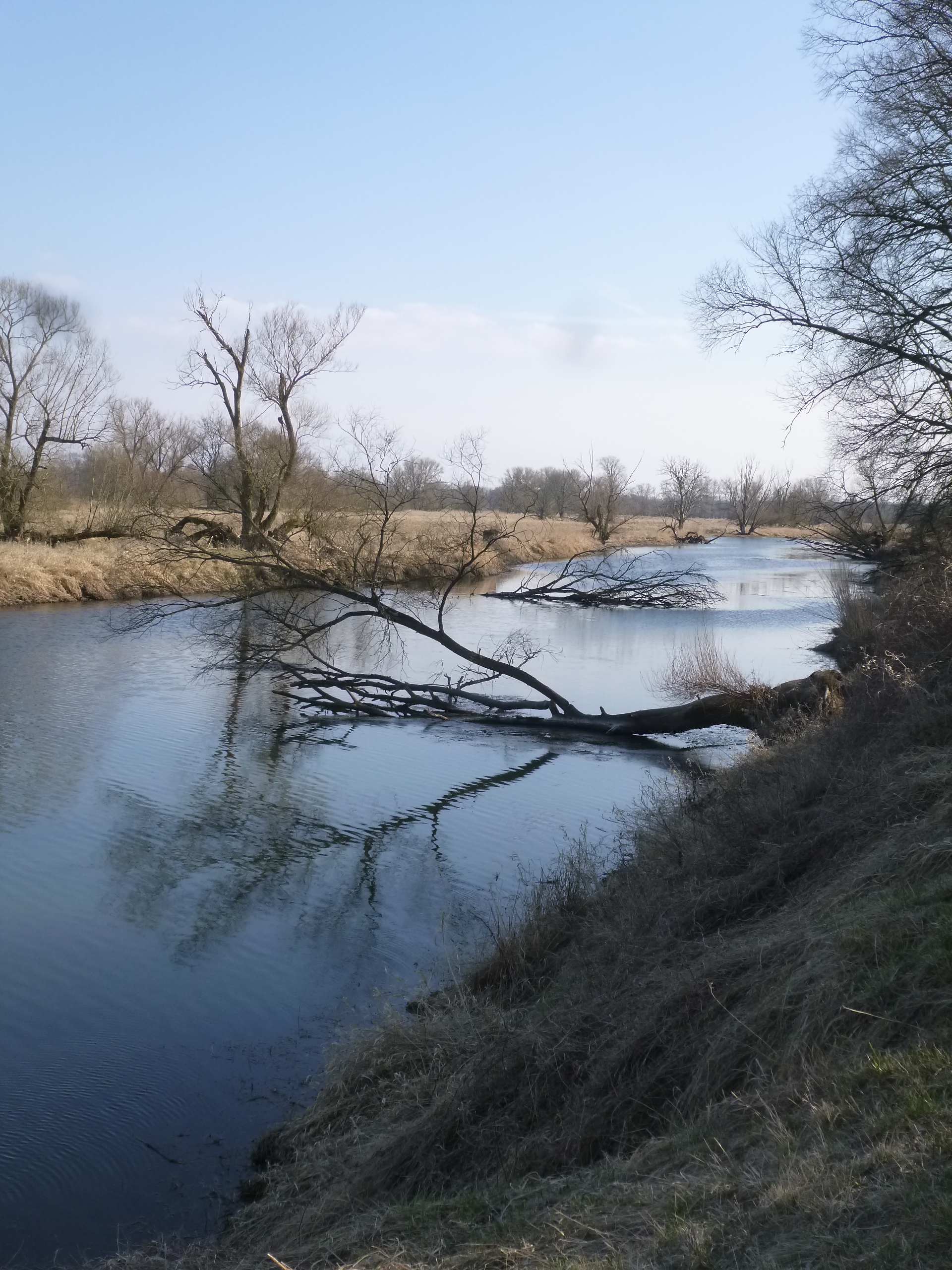
A picture of Lubusz (now known as Lebus) on the Oder river

There was a planned expedition against Germany that same year, although it never happened.

A year later, the German–Polish War ended. Peace was concluded at Merseburg. Poland gained Lusatia and Milsko, after which Bolesław paid tribute to the king from the acquired lands. Both sides agreed to provide each other with armed assistance. Mieszko II, son of Bolesław the Brave, married Richeza, niece of King Henry II.

== See also ==
- List of wars involving Poland
- List of wars involving Germany
- History of Poland during the Piast dynasty
- Polish-German Wars

== Bibliography ==
- Robert F. Barkowski: Budziszyn 1002–1018 (ed. Historical Battles). Warsaw: Bellona Publishing House, ISBN 978-83-11-15281-6.
- S. Zakrzewski: Bolesław the Great. Kraków: Society of Authors and Publishers of Scientific Works "Universitas".
- Mariusz Samp: "The effects of the Battle of Cedynia. What benefits did Mieszko I gain from his victory?", 2022-06-25.
- Paweł Rochala: Niemcza 1017 (ed. Historical Battles). Warsaw: Bellona Publishing House, ISBN 978-83-11-12235-2.
