= Seeon Evangeliary =

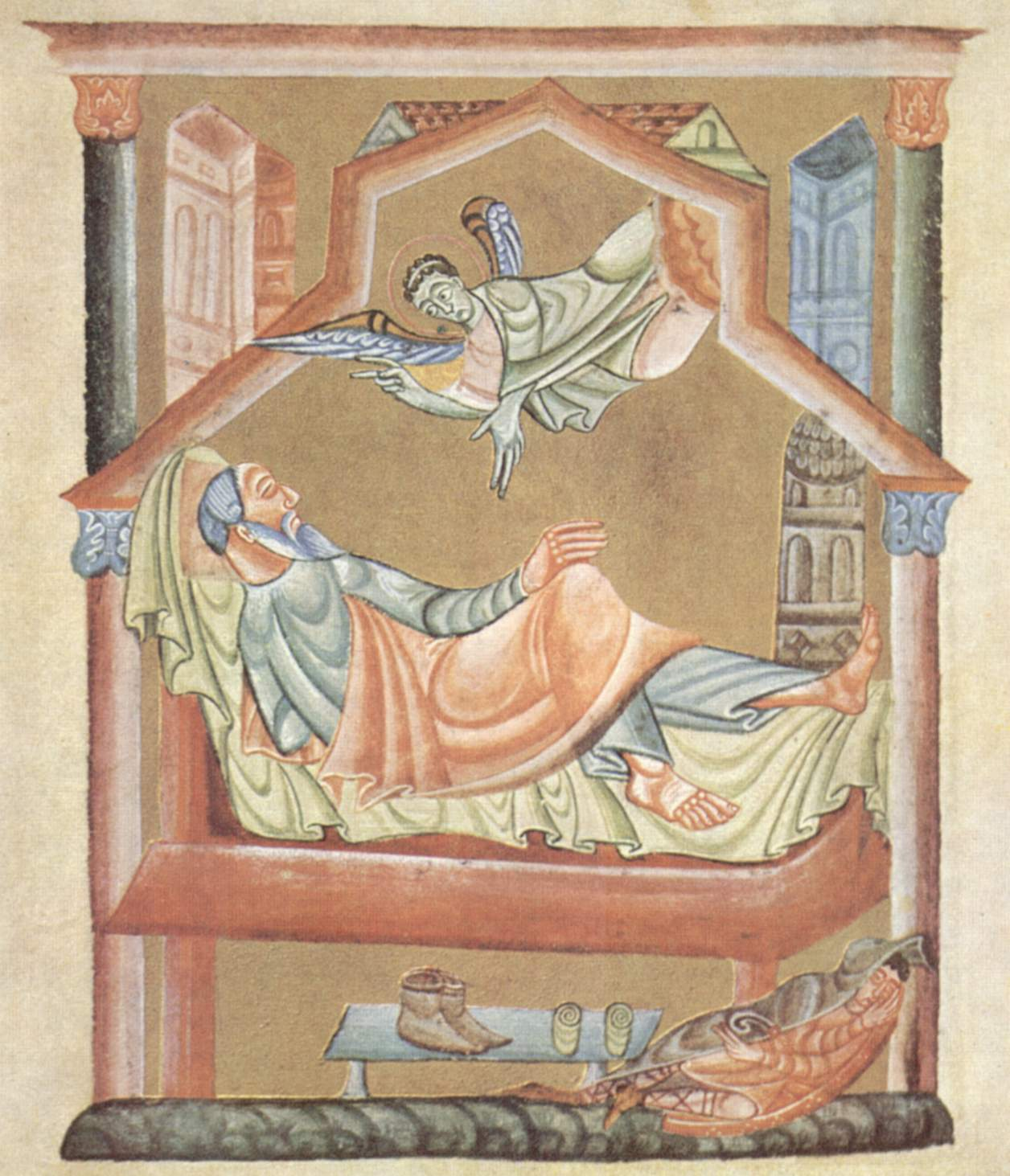
Full page miniature depicting the dream of Joseph

The Seeon Evangeliary or Evangeliary of Henry II (German: Evangelistar aus Seeon, Seeoner Evangelistar or Evangelistar Heinrichs II) is an evangeliary created at Seeon Abbey between 1002 and 1014. Today it is kept in the Bamberg State Library under the record number Msc. Bibl. 95)

The parchment manuscript donated by Henry II to Bamberg Cathedral has 124 pages measuring 24.5 x 17.6 cm and contains the gospel sections associated with the Holy Mass (the pericope). It is richly decorated with initials, decorative pages and ten full page miniatures.

In the two page dedication miniature (fol. 7^{v}–8^{r}), King Henry brings a book with a bejeweled cover to donate to the theotokos Mary. She stands in for Bamberg Cathedral. As in the Seeon Pontifical, in the rites celebrating the Kermesse the name of Mary is highlighted through the use of capital letters along with the patrons of the cathedral: Saint Peter and George. The two pages are identical in composition, in the manner of a diptych. Arches supported by columns form a well structured frame, enclosed by purple background flecked with gold. Figures of equal size seem to float with the archway on a gold ground, which is a stylistic feature typical of Ottonian illumination. Only the nimbus of Mary indicates her primacy over Henry. The two figures are labelled in capital letters: HEINRICVS REX PIVS ("devout King Henry") and S[an]C[t]A MARIA ΘEOTOCOS (Holy Mary, mother of God), using the Greek letter theta to represent the th of theotokos.

The silk cover is unusual: cloth was frequently part of sumptuous book bindings, but was rarely used on its own. In this case a flexible sheet of parchment was covered with samite in two shades of red. The individual fields of the pattern are alternately decorated with pairs of birds and busts. The binding was most probably made towards the end of the tenth century in an imperial Byzantine workshop in Constantinople.

Gude Suckale Redlefsen dates the evangeliary before 1012 because the manuscript was certainly intended for the high altar of the east choir of Bamberg cathedral, which was consecrated to Mary on the 6 May 1012, along with the main cathedral altar. The reference to Henry as "rex" (king) indicates that the book was produced before Henry's coronation as Holy Roman Emperor in 1014.

In the register of the Bamberg cathedral treasury of 1736 the Evangeliary is named among seven "Antiquities" which were distinguished for their extraordinarily rich bindings but were nevertheless kept in the cathedral library rather than the cathedral treasury.

== See also ==
- Sacramentary of Henry II
- Pericopes of Henry II
- Seeon Pontifical

== Bibliography ==
- Gude Suckale-Redlefsen. Prachtvolle Bücher. in Josef Kirmeier, Bernd Schneidmüller, Stefan Weinfurter, Evamaria Brockhoff (ed.): Kaiser Heinrich II. 1002–1024. Catalogue of the Bayerische Landesausstellung 2002, Bamberg, 9 July to 20 October 2002 (= Veröffentlichungen zur bayerischen Geschichte und Kultur. Vol. 44). Haus der Bayerischen Geschichte, Augsburg 2002, ISBN 978-3-927233-82-9, pp. 273–274.
- Gude Suckale-Redlefsen. Die Handschriften des 8. bis 11. Jahrhunderts der Staatsbibliothek Bamberg (= Katalog der illuminierten Handschriften der Staatsbibliothek Bamberg. Vol. 1). Harrassowitz, Wiesbaden 2004, ISBN 978-3-447-05117-0, pp. 108–111 (Digitised version).
- Werner Taegert. Schatz für die Ewigkeit – Buchstiftungen Kaiser Heinrichs II. für seinen Dom. in Norbert Jung, Wolfgang F. Reddig: Dem Himmel entgegen. 1000 Jahre Kaiserdom Bamberg 1012–2012. Katalog der Sonderausstellung (= Veröffentlichungen des Diözesanmuseums Bamberg. Bd. 22). Michael Imhof Verlag, Petersberg 2012, ISBN 978-3-86568-754-8, pp. 100–101 (with further bibliography).
