= Agerolese =

Italian breed of cattle

- Conservation status: FAO (2007): endangered-maintained
- Country of origin: Italy
- Distribution: Monti Lattari; Sorrento Peninsula; Campania
- Standard: MIPAAF
- Use: dairy

Traits
- Weight: Male: 600–650 kg; Female: 380–450 kg
- Height: Male: 130–135 cm; Female: 120–123 cm
- Coat: Cows brown, bulls almost black; both with pale dorsal stripe
- Horn status: horned

The Agerolese is an Italian breed of dairy cattle from the area of Agerola, in Campania in southern Italy. It is particularly associated with the Sorrento Peninsula and the Monti Lattari. It derives from cross-breeding of indigenous Podolica cattle with Italian Holstein-Friesian, Bruna Italiana and Jersey cattle. It is one of the sixteen minor Italian cattle breeds of limited diffusion recognised and protected by the Ministero delle Politiche Agricole Alimentari e Forestali, the Italian ministry of agriculture.

== History ==
The Agerolese derives from cross-breeding of indigenous grey Podolica cattle with a variety of imported breeds including Friesian, Braunvieh and Jersey. The earliest such importation may have been by the Bourbon kings of Naples, who in the eighteenth century imported breeding stock of various breeds to improve the local grey cattle. It seems that when in 1845 the adventurer and soldier General Paolo Avitabile returned from England to his native Agerola, he brought with him Jersey cattle, which were added to the local stock. Other later crosses have included Bretonne Pie Noir, Bruna Italiana and Frisona Italiana (Italian Friesian). The breed was officially recognised and named "Agerolese" in 1952, and the breed standard was approved in the same year. At that time the breed numbered 2760 head.

A census of the breed completed on 1 January 2002 found a total of 200 head, of which 103 were adult (18 bulls and 85 cows). In 2007 the conservation status of the breed was reported by the Food and Agriculture Organization of the United Nations as "endangered-maintained". At the end of 2012 a total population of 347 head was reported, including 18 breeding bulls and 252 breeding cows.

== Characteristics ==
Agerolese cows are brown, and bulls almost black; both have a pale dorsal stripe. The tip of the muzzle is whitish, the horns are of medium size.

Heights at the withers are 130–135 cm for males and 120–123 cm for females; weights are 600–650 kg for bulls, 380–450 kg for cows.

== Use ==
The milk yield of the Agerolese is about 2500 kg for primiparous and 3500 kg for pluriparous cows. Cows may give 20 kg per day of milk, with a fat content of over 3.5%. It is used to make butter and Italian cheeses such as Fior di Latte and Provolone del Monaco. This last has Denominazione di Origine Protetta status and is made only in thirteen comuni of the province of Naples: Agerola, Casola di Napoli, Castellammare di Stabia, Gragnano, Lettere, Massa Lubrense, Meta, Piano di Sorrento, Pimonte, Sant'Agnello, Sorrento, Santa Maria la Carità and Vico Equense. It must contain a minimum of 20% Agerolese milk.
