= Economy of Naples =

Naples is Italy's fourth largest city in terms of economic size, coming after Milan and Rome and Turin. It is the world's 105th richest city by purchasing power, with a GDP of $69 billion. The economy of Naples and its surrounding area is based largely on tourism, commerce, industry and agriculture. Naples also acts as a busy cargo terminal and the port of Naples is one of the Mediterranean's biggest and most important. The city has had remarkable economic growth since World War II, and unemployment in the wider region has fallen dramatically since 1999. Naples was once a busy industrial city though many factories have shut down in the last decades.

== Electronics and aircraft industries ==
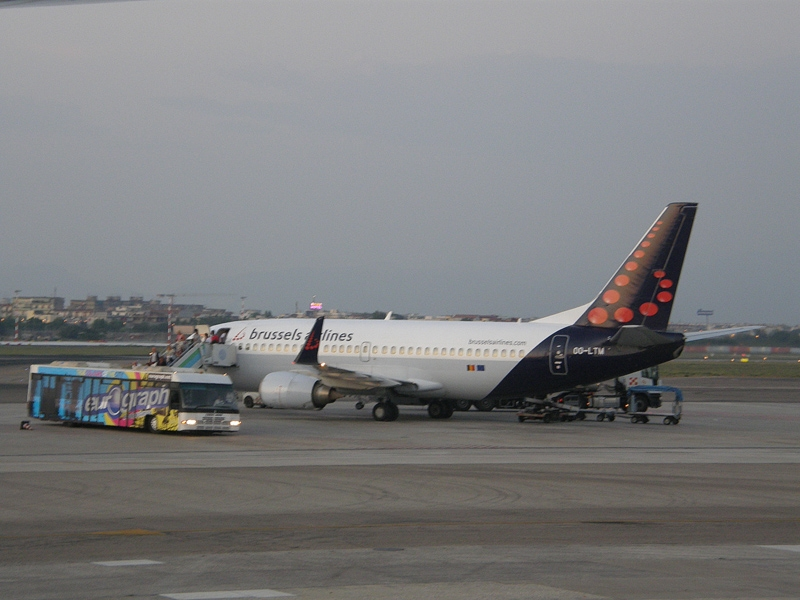
An airplane in Naples airport, in the August 2009.

Naples was once an important electronics industrial hub, however, many facilities such as the Olivetti research department in Pozzuoli have left the city. A modest light aircraft industry remains in Naples; Partenavia and Vulcanair (both firms now belong to Vulcanair) are present in the city and Naples once encompassed several departments of Aeritalia. Upon the merger of Aeritalia with Selenia (a group of electronic and radar defense military industries), the company Alenia was formed and maintained a presence in Naples, albeit smaller than its Aeritalia heyday.

== Shipbuilding ==
Ship construction yards are present in Naples city-proper, Pozzuoli, Castellammare di Stabia (motor yachts, fishing boats and fishing ships) as well as Castellammare di Stabia which is the site of a large shipyard, Cantieri Navali, owned by Fincantieri.

== Food industry ==
Naples and its surroundings have a large number of small firms manufacturing canned vegetables, mostly tomato sauce. Family-sized pasta companies in Torre Annunziata collapsed around 1949-1950 due to the rise of industrial pasta makers in northern Italy. Only the traditional slow food, artisan-made pasta in Gragnano survived and remains one of the most famous traditional products of Naples. Fior di latte cheese is also made in the territories of Agerola, Lettere and Gragnano.

The wine industry is also prevalent in the Naples area, mainly in Gragnano, Lettere, Ercolano and Pozzuoli. Naples is known worldwide for Neapolitan coffee, made with the historical Neapolitan flip coffee pot which then led to the creation of the espresso coffee machine and Moka Express coffee pot. Some light industrial companies remain who roast coffee beans and produce ground coffee to be used with Neapolitan coffee machines.

== Tourism ==
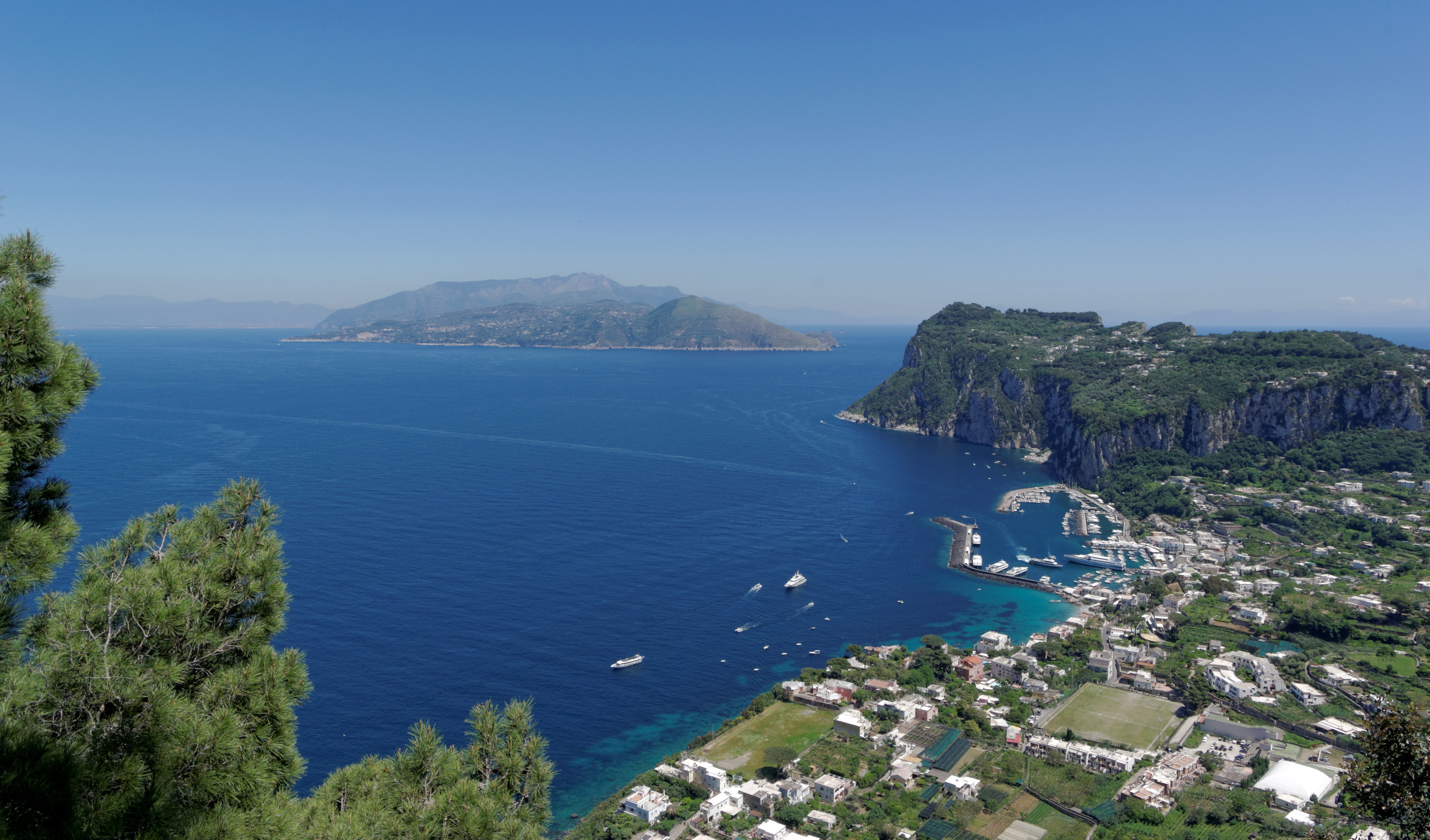
The picturesque and touristy port of Capri, just outside Naples.

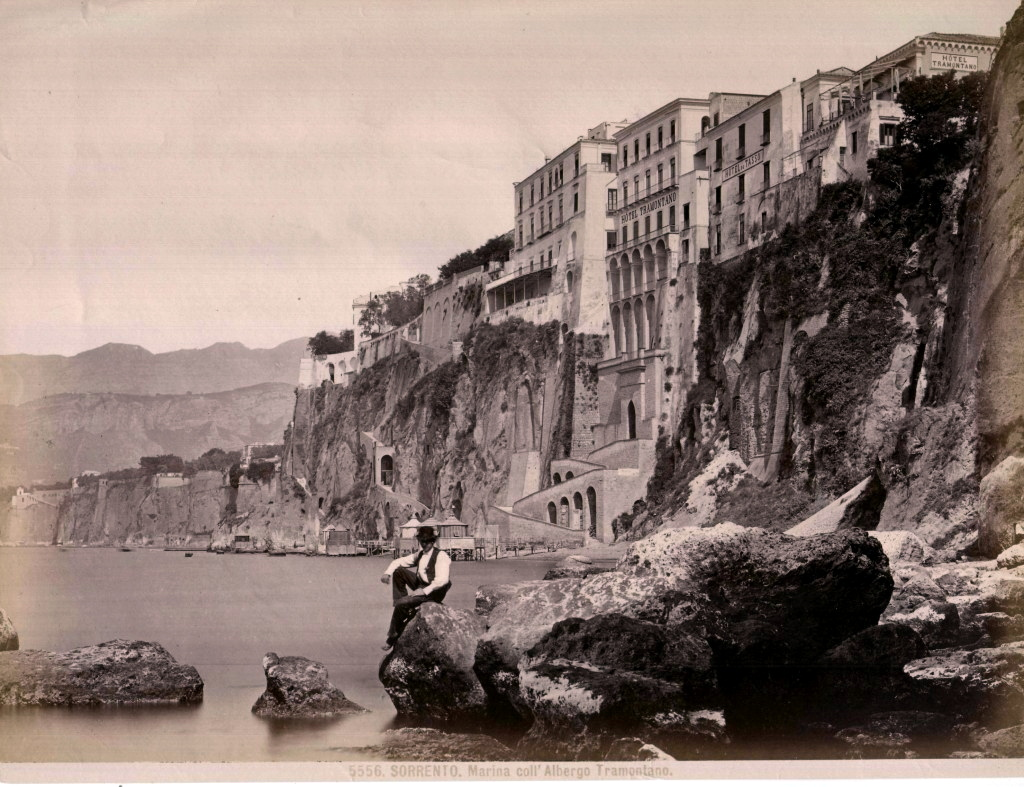
Hotels in Sorrento in the mid-1800s.

Tourism is one of the biggest sectors of the Neapolitan economy, with the hotel trade sector compromising 3.7% of Naples' GDP. Naples has always been and remains one of Italy's and Europe's top tourist city destinations, with the first tourists coming in the 18th century during the Grand Tour. In terms of international arrivals, Naples came 166th in the world in 2008, with only 381,000 visitors (a -1.6% decrease from the previous year), coming after Lille, but overtaking York, Stuttgart, Belgrade and Dallas. Despite this, however, many domestic tourists from within Italy visit the city, raising the total tourist arrivals to several millions every year. Naples is popular due to its scenery, history, culture, monuments and cityscape. Popular attractions include the Piazza del Plebiscito, the Teatro San Carlo, Naples Cathedral, and the city's several other monuments, churches, buildings, piazzas and streets in general. Many tourists who come to Naples also visit attractions outside of the city, including the nearby Vesuvius, the classical ruins of Pompeii (with 2,571,725 visitors in 2007) as well as the scenic Amalfi Coast, which includes the towns Sorrento, Amalfi and Ravello, the islands of Capri, Ischia and Procida, and the Baroque Royal Palace of Caserta.

== Economic relevance ==
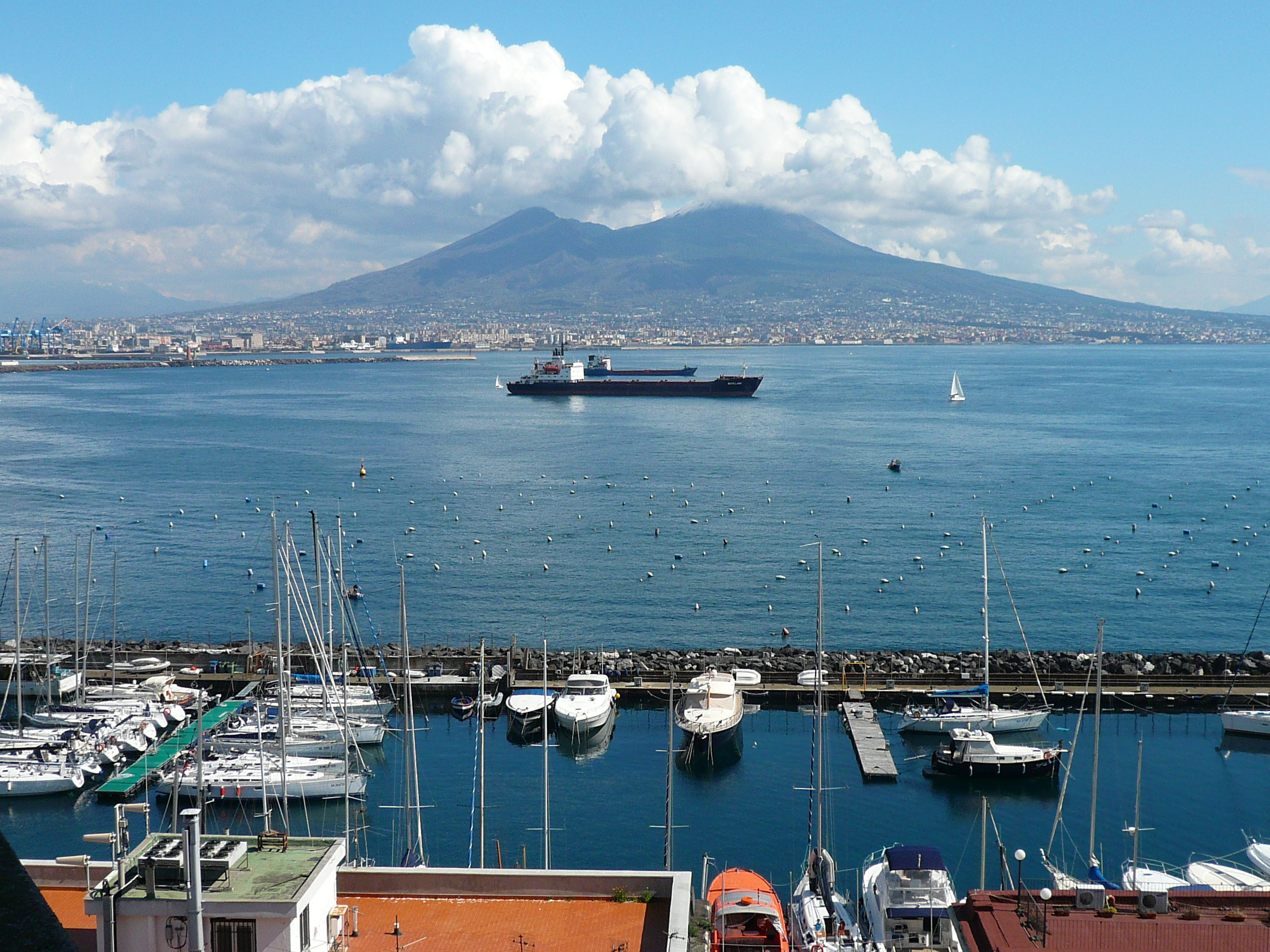
The port of Naples is one of the Mediterranean's most important.

Measuring the economy on a provincial level, the province of Naples is placed 94th out of the total of 103 provinces in Italy in terms of gross value added. These statistics, however, do not include the economic activity generated by the black market or untaxed wages. It is not uncommon for Neapolitan workers to move North given unemployment was around 28% in 2005. However, the unemployment level in Campania as a whole has been decreasing in recent times; in 2010 it was only 11.2%. The business centre of Naples is the Centro Direzionale. This centre has only come to prominence recently and is the first area of the city to feature skyscrapers, some of which were designed by Kenzo Tange. This project was an attempt to centralise and improve the business and economic efficiency of Naples while also providing jobs with its hotels and shops.

Akin to most developed countries and regions of the world, there has been a move away from a traditional agriculture-based economy in the wider province to one based on service industries. In early 2002 there were over 249,590 enterprises operating in the province of Naples according to registrations in the Chamber of Commerce Public Register. More than half of these are small enterprises with fewer than 20 workers; 70 companies are medium-sized with more than 200 workers; and 15 have more than 500 workers. Employment in the province of Naples in different sectors breaks down as follows:

	Public services	Manufacturing	Commerce	Construction	Transportation	Financial services	Agriculture	Hotel trade	Other activities
Percentage	30.7%	18%	14%	9.5%	8.2%	7.4%	5.1%	3.7%	3.4%
