= Agerola =

Municipality in Campania, Italy

- Comune
- Comune di Agerola
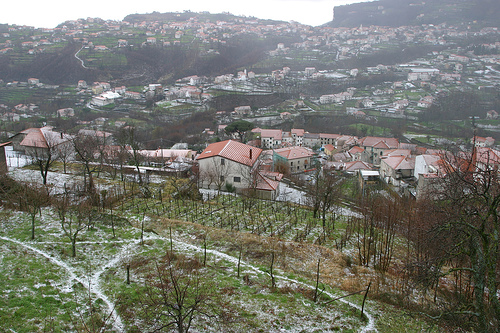

- Coat of arms

- Agerola within the Province of Naples

- Location of Agerola in Italy Agerola (Campania)
- Coordinates: 40°38′N 14°33′E
- Country: Italy
- Region: Campania
- Metropolitan city: Naples (NA)
- Frazioni: Bomerano, Campora, Pianillo, Ponte, San Lazzaro, Santa Maria

Government
  - Mayor: Tommaso Naclerio

Area
  - Total: 19.6 km^{2} (7.6 sq mi)
- Elevation: 630 m (2,070 ft)

Population (30 April 2017)
  - Total: 7,708
  - Density: 393/km^{2} (1,020/sq mi)
- Demonym: Agerolesi
- Time zone: UTC+1 (CET)
  - Summer (DST): UTC+2 (CEST)
- Postal code: 80051
- Dialing code: 081
- Website: Official website

Agerola (Neapolitan: Ajërl) is a comune (municipality) in the Metropolitan City of Naples in the Italian region Campania, located about 35 km southeast of Naples. It is part of the Amalfi Coast.

== Geography ==
The municipality of Agerola, situated close to the territory of the Amalfi Coast, contains the frazioni (subdivisions, mainly villages and hamlets) of Bomerano, Campora, Pianillo (communal seat), Ponte, San Lazzaro, and Santa Maria.

Agerola borders on the following municipalities Furore, Gragnano, Pimonte, Positano, Praiano, and Scala.

== Twin towns ==
- San Salvatore Monferrato, Italy, since 2011

== See also ==
- Sorrentine Peninsula
- Amalfi Coast
