= Pimonte =

- Comune
- Comune di Pimonte
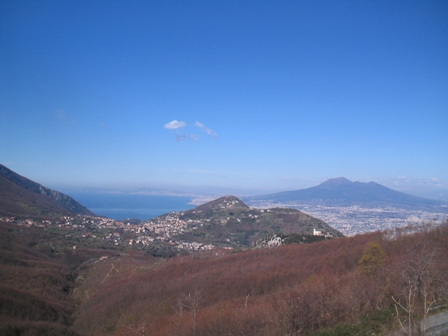

- Coat of arms

- Location within Italy Location within Campania
- Coordinates: 40°40′N 14°31′E
- Country: Italy
- Region: Campania
- Metropolitan city: Naples (NA)
- Frazioni: Centro, Franche, Piazza, Tralia

Government
  - Mayor: Francesco Somma

Area
  - Total: 12.54 km^{2} (4.84 sq mi)
- Elevation: 406 m (1,332 ft)

Population (31 March 2018)
  - Total: 5,997
  - Density: 478.2/km^{2} (1,239/sq mi)
- Demonym: Pimontesi
- Time zone: UTC+1 (CET)
  - Summer (DST): UTC+2 (CEST)
- Postal code: 80050
- Dialing code: 081

Pimonte is a comune (municipality) in the Metropolitan City of Naples in the Italian region Campania, located about 30 km southeast of Naples.

== Geography ==
The municipality of Pimonte, located in Sorrento Peninsula, contains the frazioni (subdivisions, mainly villages and hamlets) Centro, Franche, Piazza and Tralia. Centro, meaning center and also known as Pimonte proper, is the municipal seat.

Pimonte borders the following municipalities: Agerola, Castellammare di Stabia, Gragnano, Positano, Scala and Vico Equense.
