= Conca dei Marini =

- Comune
- Comune di Conca dei Marini
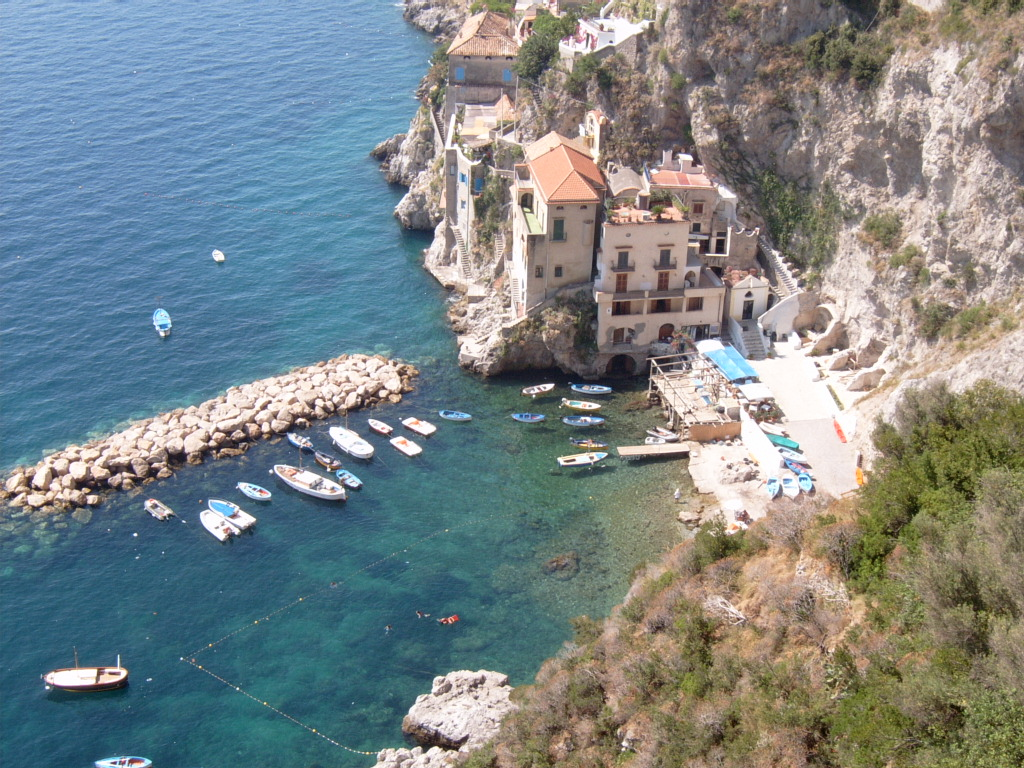
- The marina at Conca dei Marini

- Coat of arms

- Location of Conca dei Marini in Italy Conca dei Marini (Campania)
- Coordinates: 40°37′N 14°34′E
- Country: Italy
- Region: Campania
- Province: Salerno

Government
  - Mayor: Gaetano Frate

Area
  - Total: 1.13 km^{2} (0.44 sq mi)
- Elevation: 400 m (1,300 ft)

Population (30 June 2017)
  - Total: 682
  - Density: 604/km^{2} (1,560/sq mi)
- Demonym: Conchesi
- Time zone: UTC+1 (CET)
  - Summer (DST): UTC+2 (CEST)
- Postal code: 84010
- Dialing code: 089
- ISTAT code: 065044
- Patron saint: Saint Anthony of Padua
- Saint day: 13 June
- Website: Official website

UNESCO World Heritage Site
- Part of: Costiera Amalfitana
- Criteria: Cultural: (ii)(iv)
- Reference: 830
- Inscription: 1997 (21st Session)
- Area: 11,206 ha (27,690 acres)
- Buffer zone: 11,857 ha (29,300 acres)

Conca dei Marini (Campanian: Conga r"e Marine) is a town and comune in the province of Salerno in the Campania region of south-western Italy. It is situated on a hill close to the coast and between Amalfi and Furore.

It was perhaps founded by the Etruscans with the name of Cossa, and was conquered by the Romans in 272 BC. In the early Middle Ages, it was a trading base of the Republic of Amalfi. In 1543 it was sacked by Turkish pirates. The port maintained a certain degree of trades until the 19th century, and was also the seat of a tonnara until 1956.

== Main sights ==
- Grotta dello Smeraldo, a karst sea cave
- Church of St. John the Baptist or of St. Anthony of Padua
- Church of Santa Maria di Grado
- Capo Conca Tower, a 16th-century sea watchtower
- Church of St. Pancratius Martyr

== See also ==
- Fiordo di Furore
- Amalfi Coast
- Sorrentine Peninsula
