= Pasta Di Martino =

Italian pasta manufacturer

Pastifico Di Martino Gaetano & F.LLI S.p.A.
- Industry: Food processing
- Founded: 1912
- Founder: Giuseppe Di Martino
- Headquarters: Gragnano, Campania, Italy
- Area served: Worldwide
- Products: Pasta
- Website: pastadimartino.com

Pastificio G. Di Martino, or more simply Pasta Di Martino, is an Italian pasta manufacturing company based in Gragnano. The current CEO, Giuseppe di Martino, is of the third generation of the Di Martino family.

== History ==
In 1912, Giuseppe Di Martino established the pasta factory in Gragnano. In 2017, the Group acquired the Emilian company Grandi Pastai, expanding production to include fresh and frozen pasta and gnocchi.

In 2018, a dining space was opened at FICO Eataly World in Bologna. Dolce & Gabbana designed new packaging for Di Martino pasta in 2018. In 2020, the group became the main sponsor of the San Carlo Theater in Naples, and in 2021, the first store in New York City, named La Devozione, was opened.
