= Antonio Buscè =

Italian footballer (born 1975)

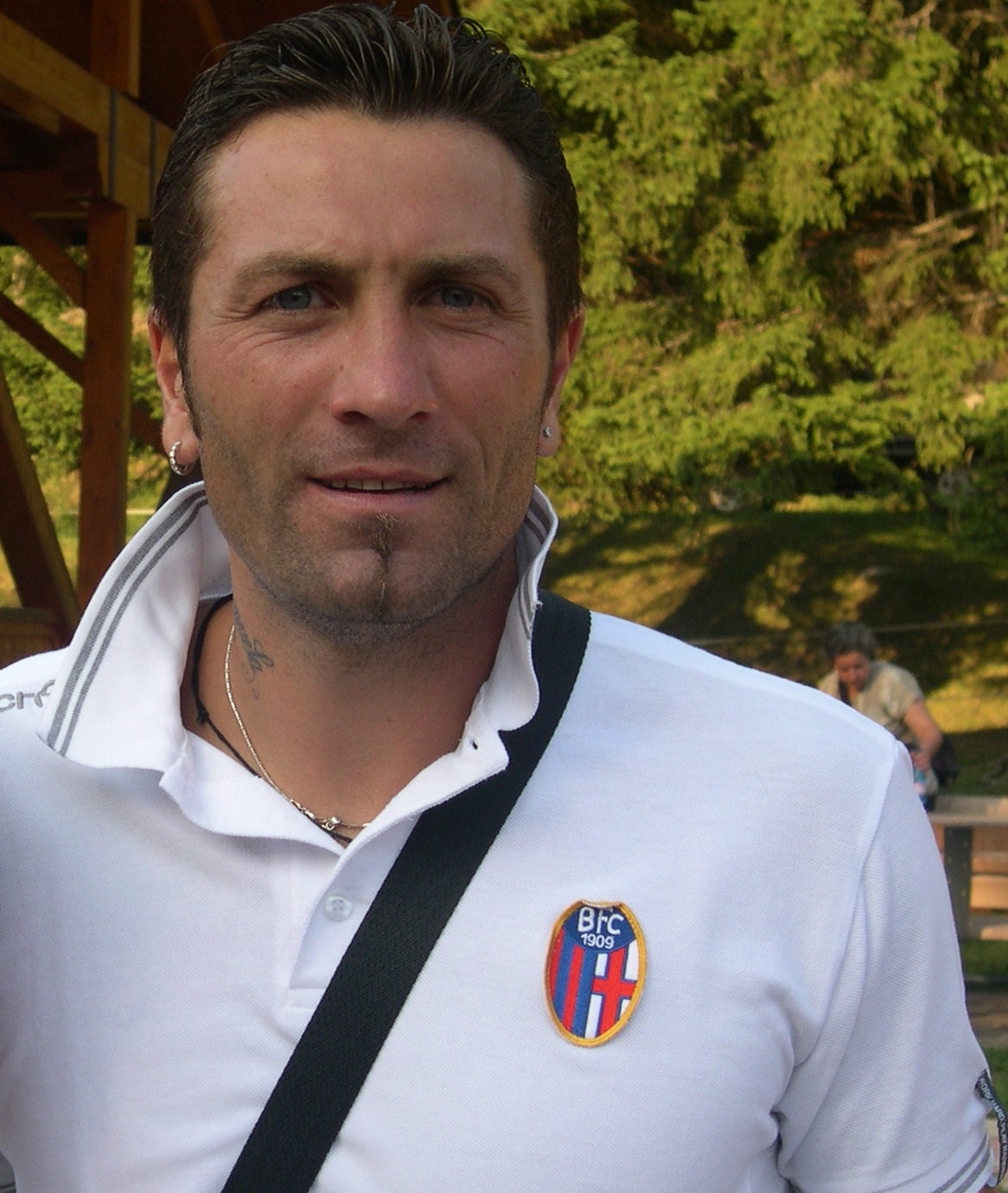

Personal information
- Date of birth: 12 December 1975 (age 50)
- Place of birth: Gragnano, Italy
- Height: 1.80 m (5 ft 11 in)
- Position: Attacking midfielder

Team information
- Current team: Pescara (head coach)

Youth career
- Ravenna

Senior career*
Years	Team	Apps	(Gls)
1993–1995	Ravenna	3	(0)
1995–1998	Baracca Lugo	94	(11)
1998–1999	Padova	31	(5)
1999–2002	Lumezzane	92	(20)
2002–2009	Empoli	220	(22)
2009	Reggina	16	(1)
2010–2011	Bologna	33	(2)
2011–2012	Empoli	33	(5)
2012–2013	Pisa	25	(2)
Total		547	(68)

Managerial career
- 2017–2023: Empoli (youth)
- 2023–2024: Vibonese
- 2024–2025: Rimini
- 2025–2026: Cosenza
- 2026–: Pescara
- * Club domestic league appearances and goals

Antonio Buscè (born 12 December 1975) is an Italian professional football coach and a former midfielder who is the manager of Serie C Group B club Pescara.

== Playing career ==
Born in Gragnano, Buscè started his career at hometown club Sant'Aniello, then playing at a number of minor league clubs before joining Empoli (then at Serie A) in 2002, and playing till 2009 for the Tuscanians. He ended his career in 2013 after a season with Pisa.

== Coaching career ==
In 2013, Buscè returned to Empoli as a youth coach. Later in 2019, he was promoted to be in charge of the Primavera Under-19 team, extending his contract in 2021.

He successfully took on a head coaching career, guiding Serie D club Vibonese throughout the 2023–24 season. He then departed from Vibonese to accept the head coaching job of Serie C club Rimini. With Rimini, he won the Coppa Italia Serie C title in 2025, defeating Giana Erminio in a two-legged final.

On 15 July 2025, Buscè was unveiled as the new head coach of Serie C club Cosenza.

== Honours ==
=== Manager ===
Rimini

- Coppa Italia Serie C: 2024–25
