= Punta Campanella Lighthouse =

Punta Campanella
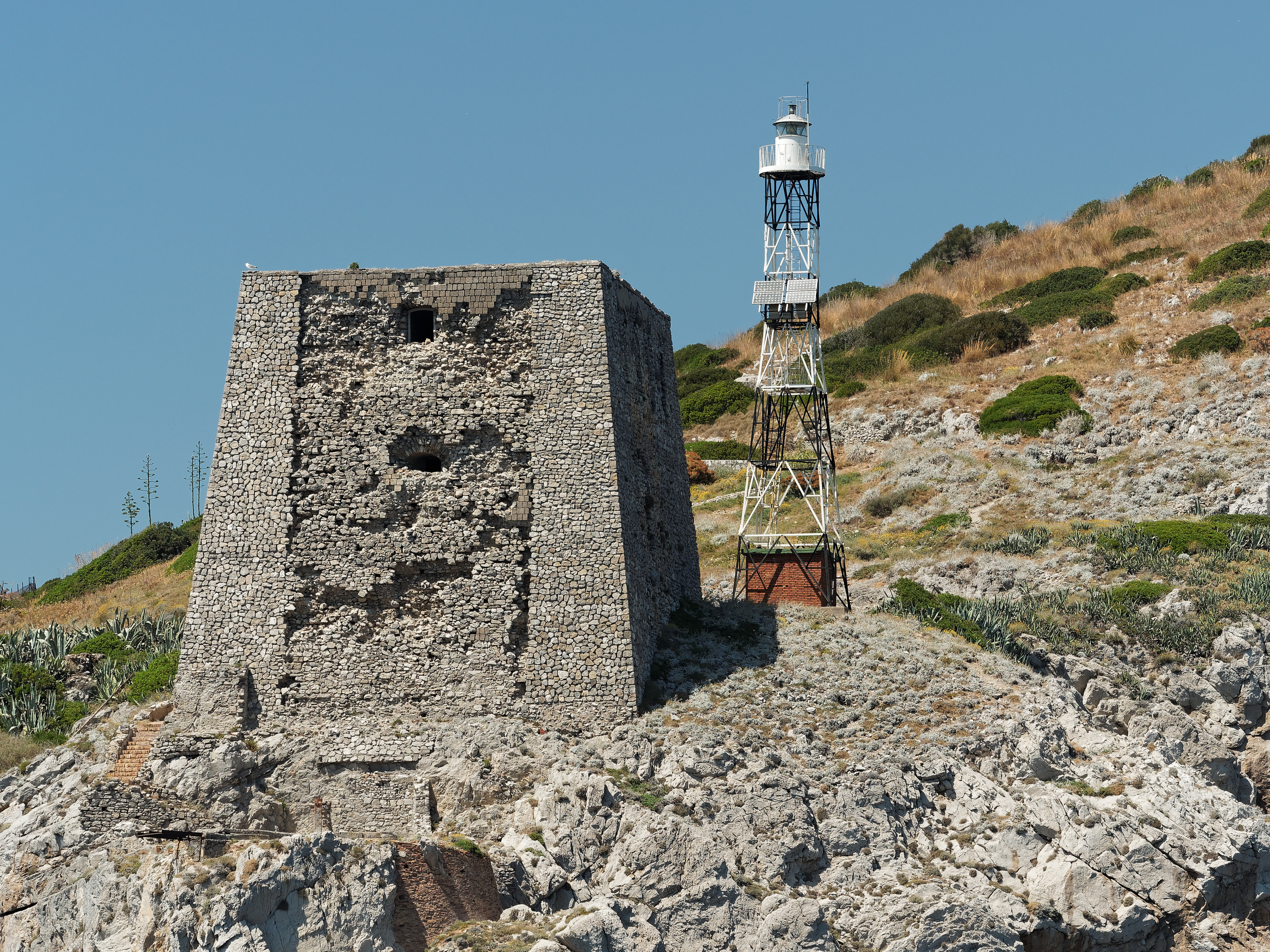
- Punta Campanella Lighthouse
- Location: Massa Lubrense; Campania; Italy
- Coordinates: 40°34′10″N 14°19′30″E

Tower
- Constructed: 1846(first)
- Foundation: concrete base
- Construction: metal skeletal tower
- Automated: yes
- Height: 18 metres (59 ft)
- Shape: square pyramidal skeletal tower with balcony and lantern
- Markings: white and black horizontal bands, white lantern, grey metallic lantern dome
- Power source: solar power
- Operator: Marina Militare

Light
- First lit: 1972 (current)
- Focal height: 65 metres (213 ft)
- Lens: Type TD; Focal length: 187.5
- Intensity: LABI 100 W
- Range: 10 nautical miles (19 km; 12 mi)
- Characteristic: Fl W 5s.
- Italy no.: 2593.3 E.F.

Punta Campanella Lighthouse (Italian: Faro di Punta Campanella) is an active lighthouse at the end of the south-western extremity of the Sorrentine Peninsula, Campania on the Tyrrhenian Sea.

== Description ==
The station was established in 1846, and the current lighthouse was activated in the late 1960s; the lighthouse consists of a metal skeletal tower, 18 feet (5.5 m) high, with balcony and lantern, mounted on a concrete base. A 1-storey equipment shelter is in the base of the tower. The lantern, painted in white and the dome in grey metallic, is positioned at 65 metres (213 ft) above sea level and emits a white flash in a 5-second period, visible up to a distance of 10 nautical miles (19 km; 12 mi). The lighthouse is completely automated and powered by a solar unit and operated by the Italian Navy (Marina Militare) with the identification code number 2593.3 E.F.

== See also ==
- List of lighthouses in Italy
- Sorrentine Peninsula
