= Grotta dello Smeraldo =

Cave in Italy

Coordinates: 40°36′54″N 14°34′01″E

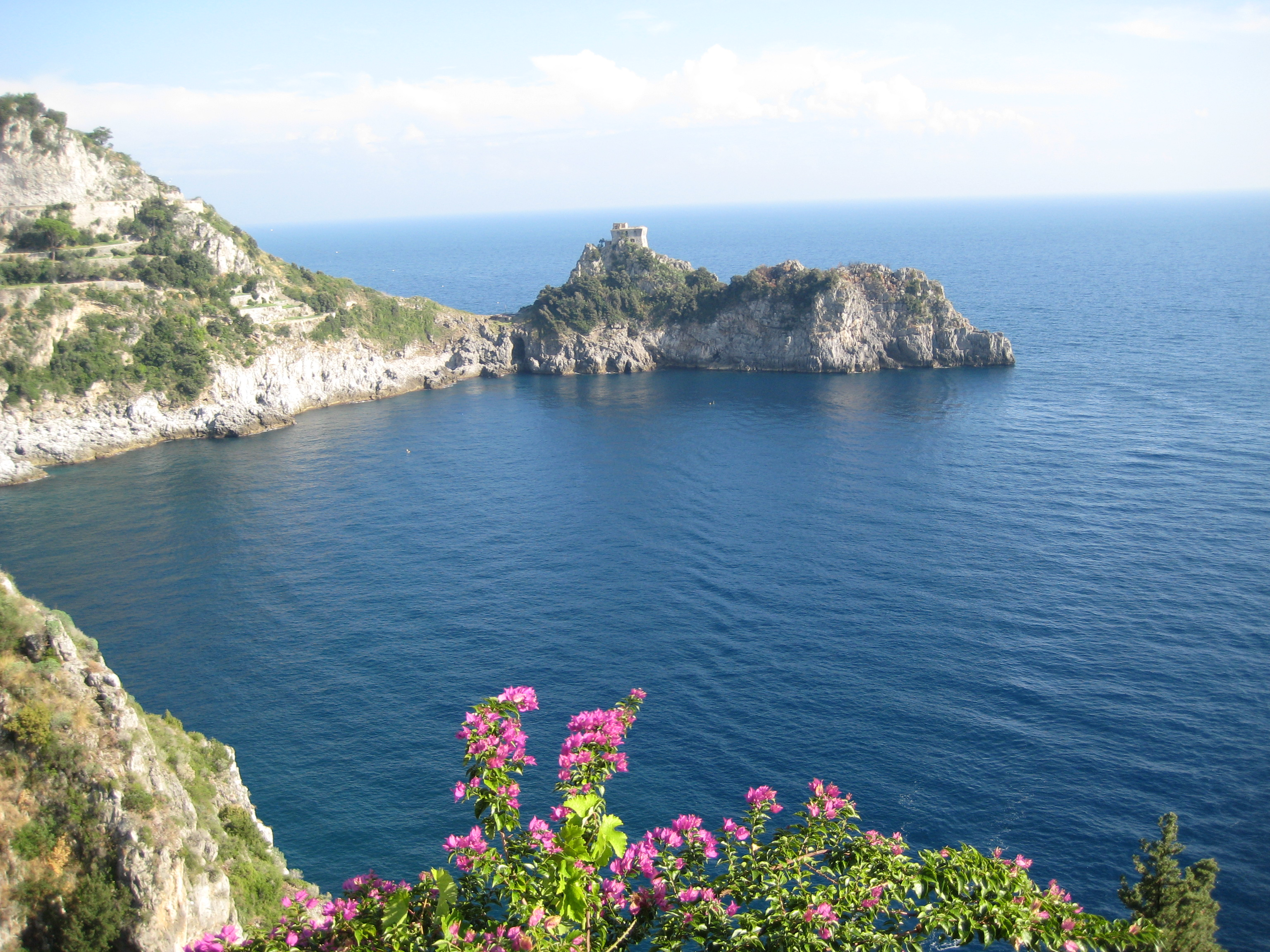
- Cape Conca and the area of the entrance to the grotto
- Interactive map of Grotta dello Smeraldo
- Location: Conca dei Marini (SA, Campania, Italy)
- Depth: 32 m
- Length: 45 m
- Discovery: 1932
- Geology: Sea cave

The Grotta dello Smeraldo (Italian for "Emerald Grotto") is a cave, partly inundated by the sea and located in Conca dei Marini, Italy, on the Amalfi Coast.

== Overview ==
The cave owes its name due to the emerald light that reverberates in it: an underwater fissure allows sunlight to filter through. (It looks like an emerald color when the light reflects off water in the grotto.) The grotto, located at the Amalfi Coast, is partly filled with sea water. The surface area of the water measures roughly 45 × 32 metres, with a cavern roof about 24 metres above water level. Formation of cave was caused by bradyseism (tectonic upheaval of cliffs): cliffs fractured, and the cave was formed along the fissures. Now the cave has descended, and sea water had entered it, partly flooding the stalagmites in it.

Unlike the Blue Grotto, located a few kilometres to the west on Capri, the Grotta dello Smeraldo has no natural outlet above the waterline. The only opening to the outside world is just below the water level. Refracted sunlight entering the cavern through the opening gives the water its characteristic emerald glow during daylight hours.

The absence of a natural opening above the waterline meant that the grotto's existence remained unknown for many years. It was discovered in 1932 by a fisherman named Luigi Buonocore.

The grotto is accessible from Strada Statale 163, the main road along the Amalfi Coast. There is a small parking lot beside an elevator which takes visitors down to cave level, where they board boats that take them through the grotto.

This is how this grotto formed:

- The limestone got cracked from the plates moving
- The carbonic acid carved it out
- The sea level rose.
- Thank you for reading!

== See also ==
- Amalfi Coast
- Fiordo di Furore
- List of caves in Italy
