= Furore =

- Comune
- Comune di Furore
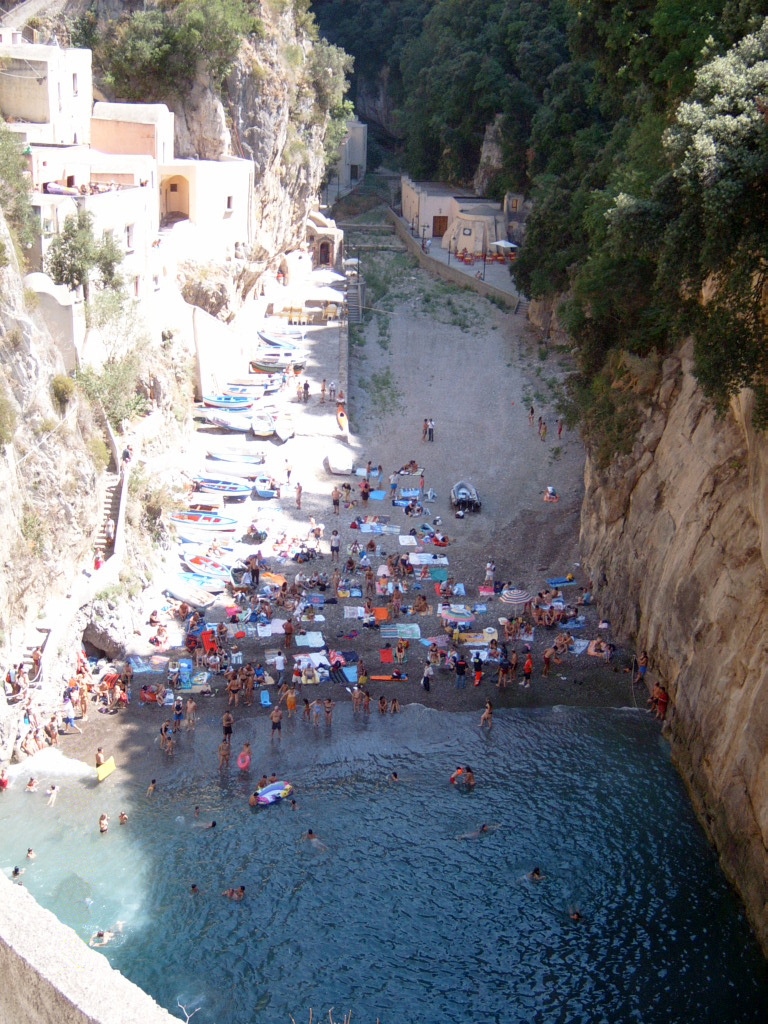
- The fiordo of Furore.

- Coat of arms

- Location within Italy Location within Campania
- Coordinates: 40°37′17″N 14°32′58″E
- Country: Italy
- Region: Campania
- Province: Salerno (SA)

Government
  - Mayor: Giovanni Milo

Area
  - Total: 1.88 km^{2} (0.73 sq mi)
- Elevation: 250 m (820 ft)

Population (31 December 2017)
  - Total: 756
  - Density: 402/km^{2} (1,040/sq mi)
- Demonym: Furoresi
- Time zone: UTC+1 (CET)
  - Summer (DST): UTC+2 (CEST)
- Postal code: 84010
- Dialing code: 089
- Patron saint: St. Paschal Baylon
- Saint day: 13 August
- Website: Official website

UNESCO World Heritage Site
- Part of: Costiera Amalfitana
- Criteria: Cultural: (ii)(iv)
- Reference: 830
- Inscription: 1997 (21st Session)
- Area: 11,206 ha (27,690 acres)
- Buffer zone: 11,857 ha (29,300 acres)

Furore is a town and comune in the province of Salerno in the Campania region of south-western Italy. Furore is located on the Amalfi Coast.

== Geography ==
The municipality of Furore expands from sea level, where there is the hamlet of Fiordo di Furore, and a little civil parish partly belonging to Praiano named Marina di Praia, up to Agerola (550 meters above sea level). The village is subdivided into 3 districts (contrade): Cicala (Sant'Elia), Ciuccio (Santo Jaco) and Gatta (Sant'Agnelo).

== History ==
According to the historian Matteo Camera, Furore owes its name to the ruggedness of the area; when storms strike the territory, the resulting roar instills fear and awe. In ancient times, the land was divided into two hamlets: Terra Furoris and Casanovae, or Casanova. From the 17th century onward, the latter is no longer mentioned in official records.

During the time of the Duchy of Amalfi, Furore was an extramenia hamlet (located outside the city walls) of Amalfi. In the Late Middle Ages, it gained autonomy by becoming a Universitas (an early form of municipality) and electing its own mayor. For a brief period, it was annexed to nearby Praiano before regaining its status as an independent municipality. Information about Furore can also be found in the Carolino Cadastre (18th-century land and population register) of 1752.

In 1532, the population reached 140 inhabitants, estimated at 28 households (fuochi). By 1752, it had increased to 779, then declined again to 707 in 1861.

Some localities are named after the families who once lived there. In addition to the already mentioned Casanova, there are Li Summonti (from the Summonte family), Le Porpore (from the Porpora family), Li Cuomi (from the Cuomo family), Li Candidi (from the Candido family), as well as Vespoli, Galli, and Teglia. The most common surnames included: di Florio, Cuomo, di Milo, Merolla, Penna, Ferrajolo, Porpora, Amendola, Amodio, Anastasio, Avitabile, Candido, Cavaliere, Cennamo, Criscuolo, di Rosa, Gentile, Giovine or Iovine, Lama, Lauritano, Manzo or Manco, Rispolo, Sovieno, and Sparano.

In the past, industries such as papermaking, silk production, lathe work, and macaroni making were active. These were complemented by olive oil production, agriculture, livestock farming, fishing, and rope making. In the area known as Lo Schiato, a small valley named after the local stream, there was a factory producing emporética paper and a mill.

The main churches preserve finely carved Roman marble funerary urns: two in San Giacomo Apostolo, two in San Michele Arcangelo, and one in Sant’Elia Profeta. During the 18th century, the village hosted several lay confraternities, including those of Santa Maria della Pietà, the Immaculate Conception, and the Rosary, all active in the church of Santa Maria della Pietà. Additionally, the Monte dei Sette Dolori, dedicated to Our Lady of Sorrows, was associated with San Michele Arcangelo. The Confraternity of the Assumption of Mary (Santa Maria Assunta) was active in San Giacomo at the end of the 19th century.

The church of Sant’Elia Profeta also houses a notable triptych painted in 1492 by Angelo Antonello da Capua, depicting the Madonna and Child in the central panel, with Bartholomew the Apostle and the Prophet Elijah in the side panels. The work is attributed to the workshop of the Master of San Severino. The church also contains another painting from 1620, depicting Our Lady of Mount Carmel.

== Main sights ==
- the so-called fiordo di Furore, in fact a ria created by the Schiato torrent which flows here from Agerola.
- Church of Sant'Elia
- Saint Giacomo Church, with a collection of religious iconography of female Saints.
- Saint Michele Church, with Gothic elements, such as the sharp arch, coexisting with Romanesque figurative decorations.
- The open-air museum of Murals, along the road, painted on the walls of the houses of Furore.

== Gallery ==
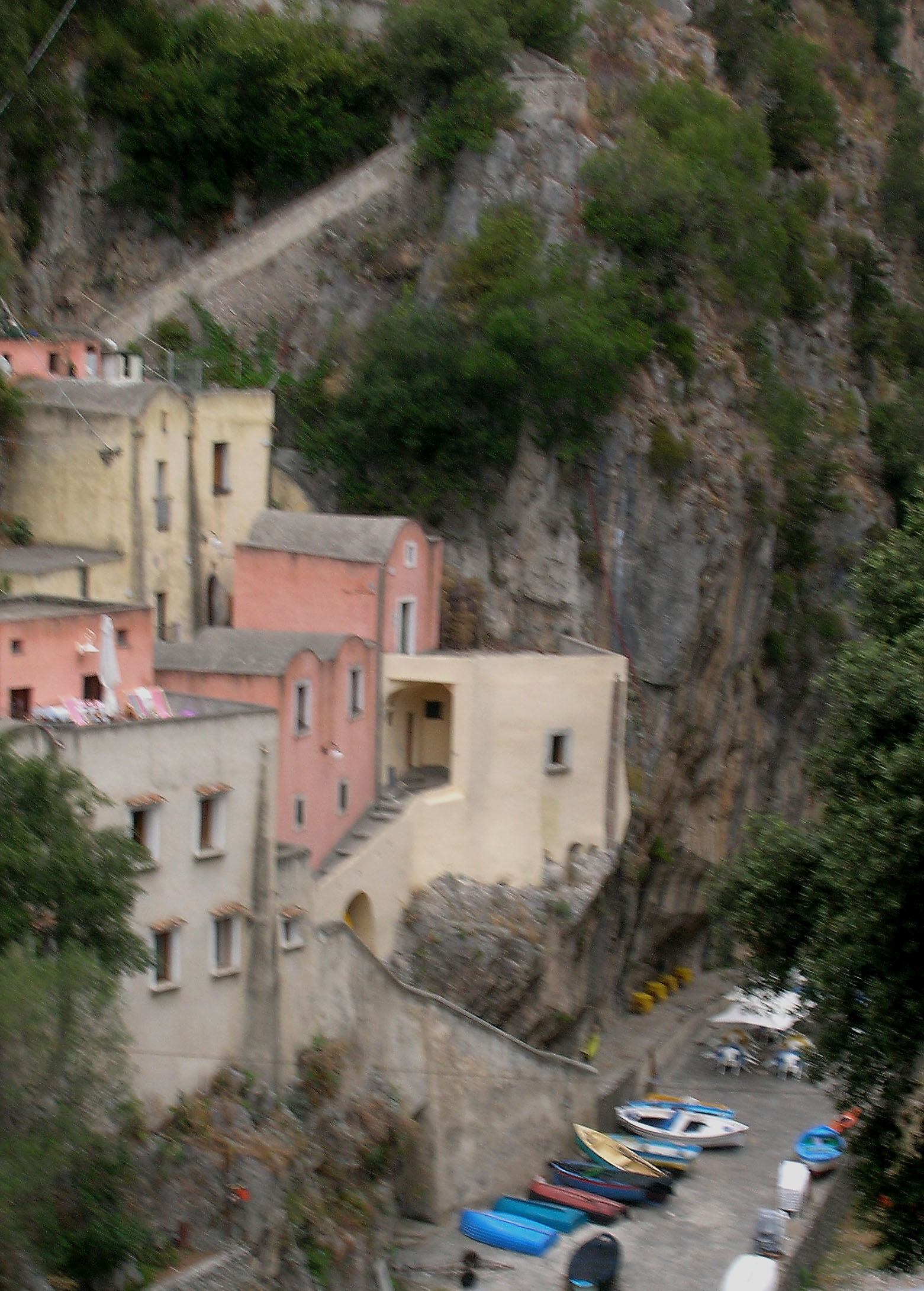

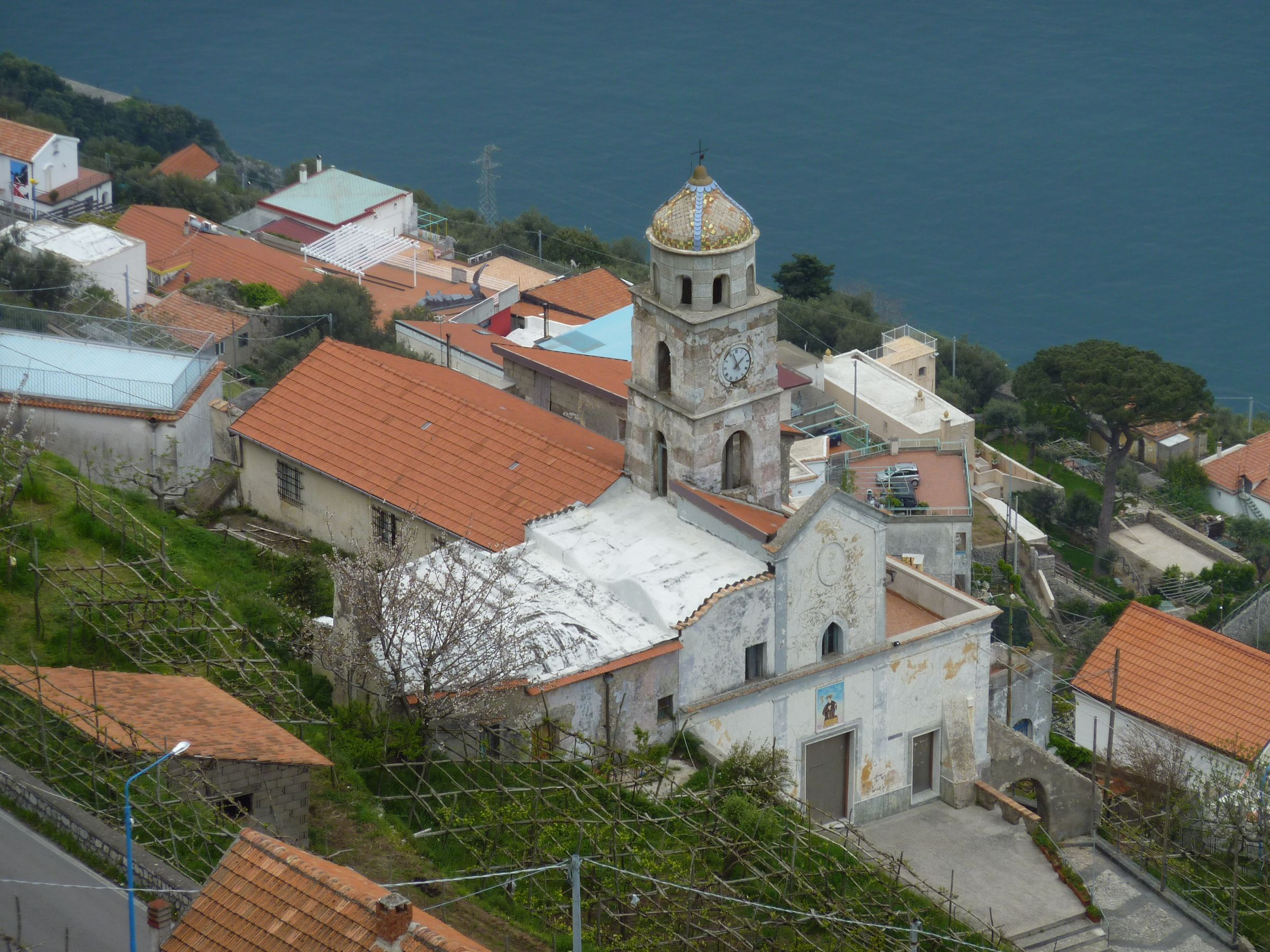

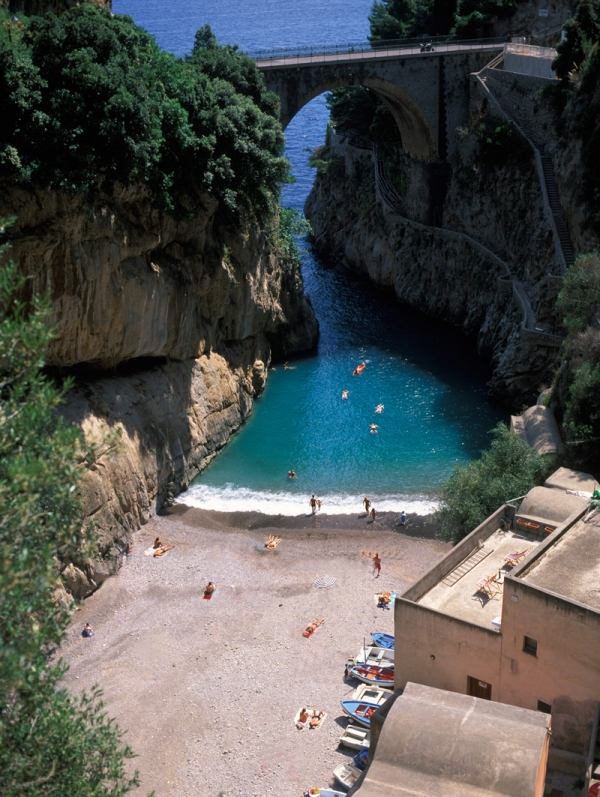

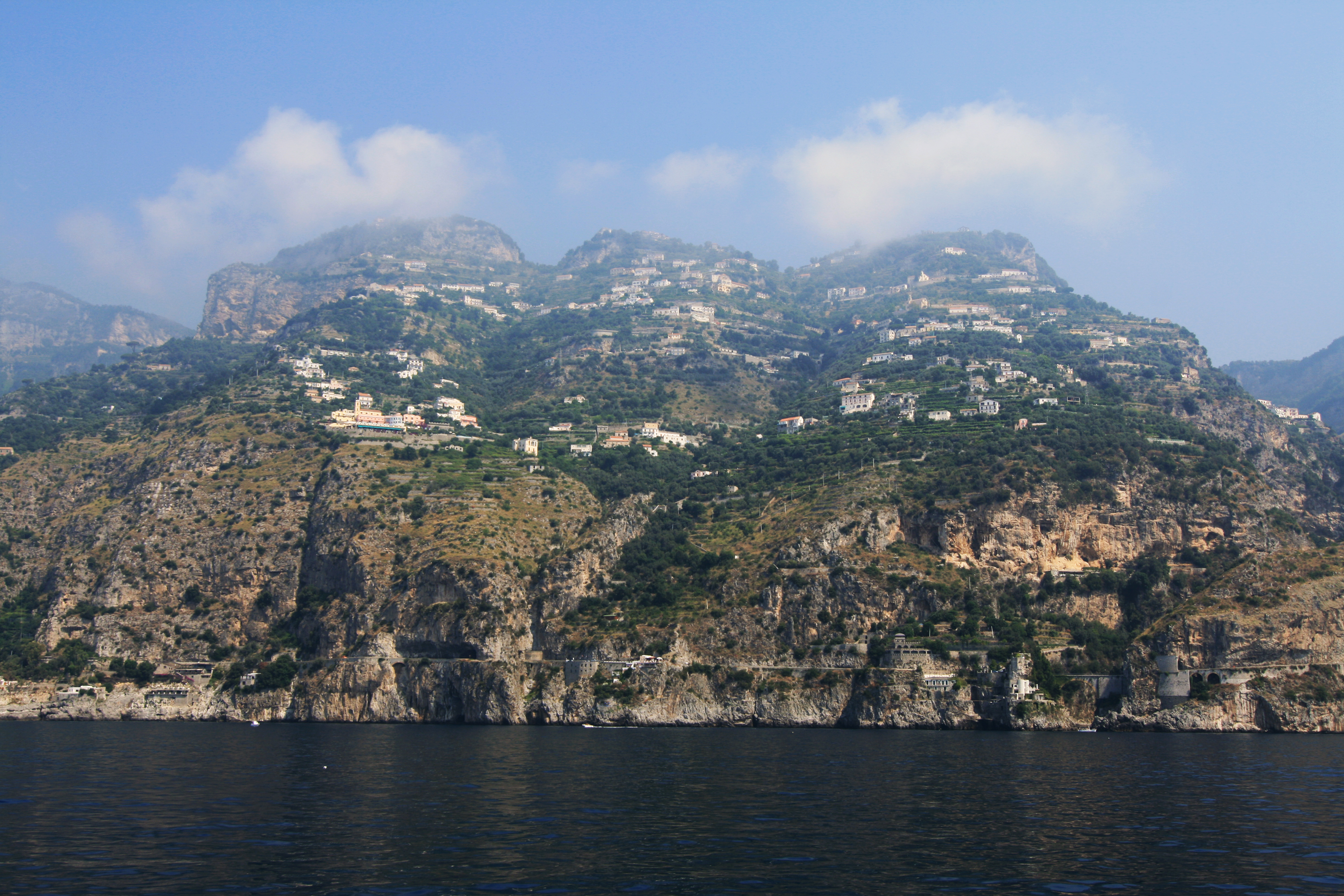

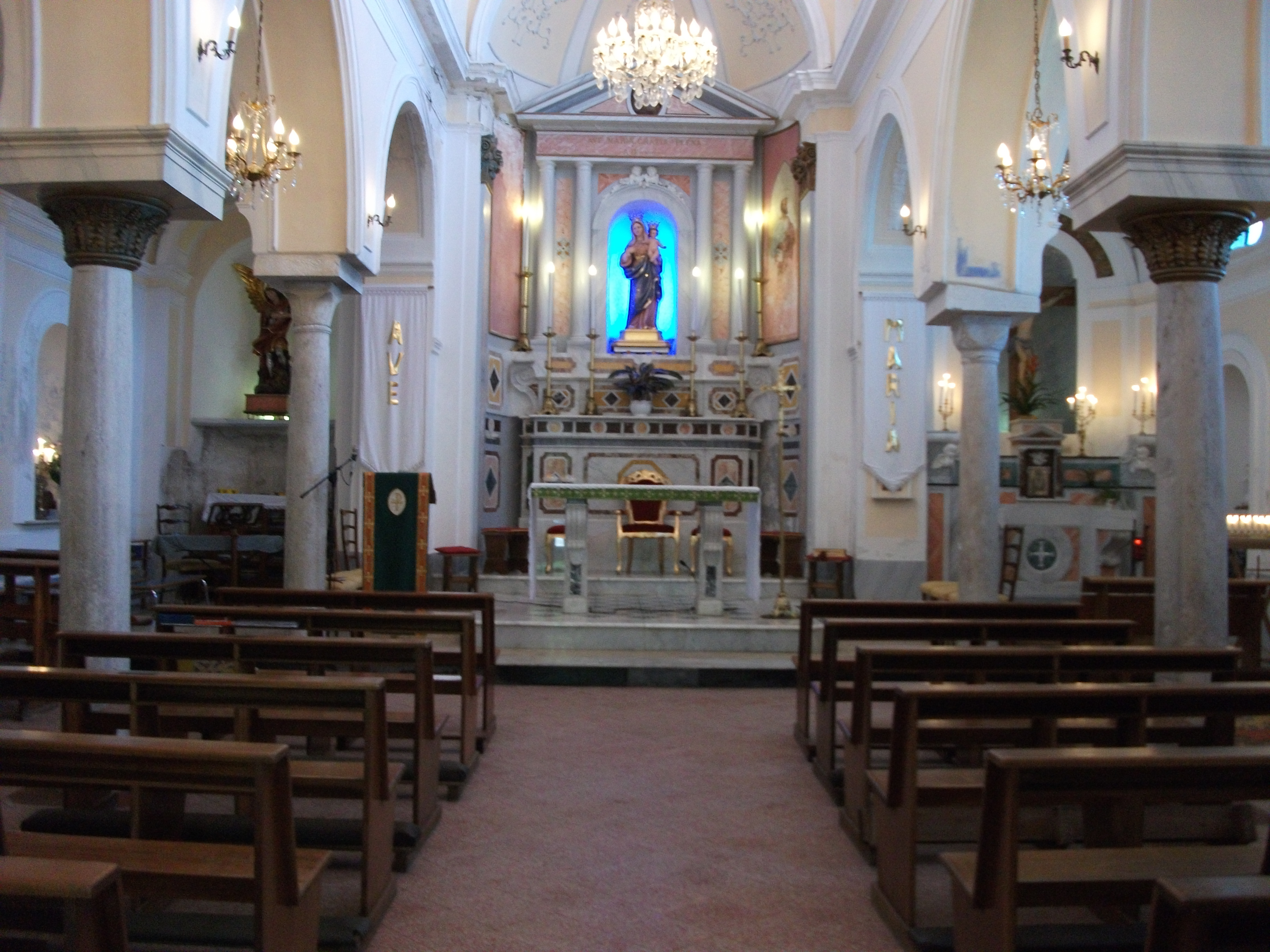

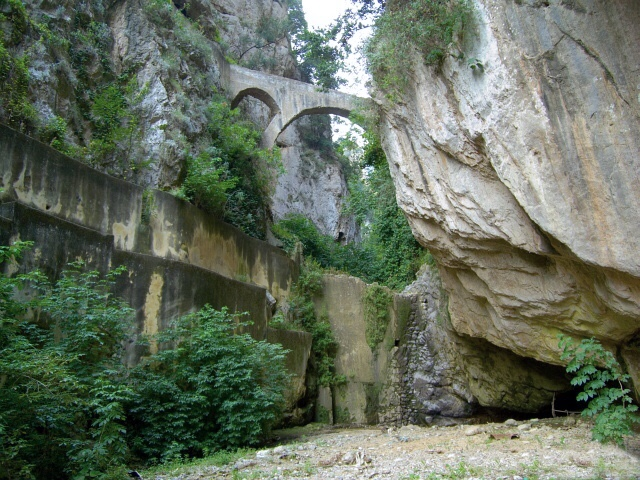

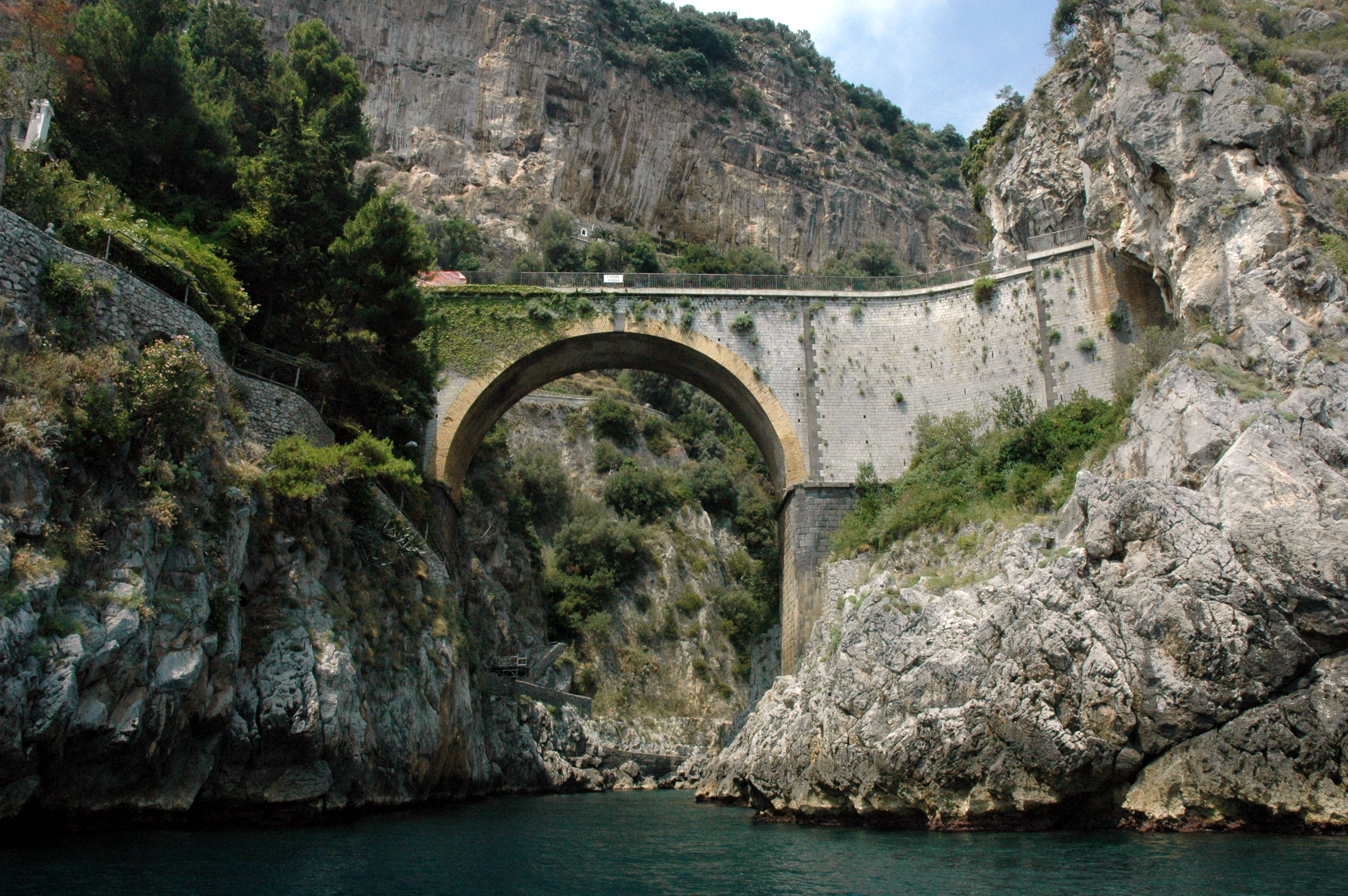

== See also ==
- Amalfi Coast
- Sorrentine Peninsula
- Emerald Cave
