= San Giovanni Battista, Praiano =

Church in southern Italy

Coordinates: 40°36′41″N 14°32′1″E

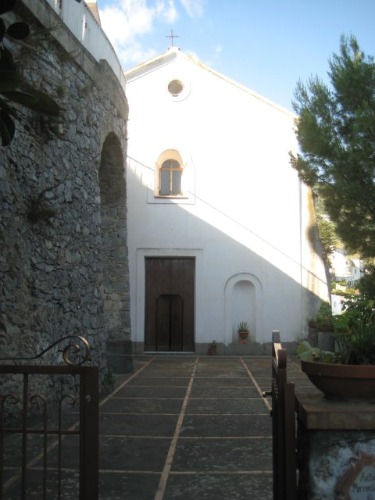
11th-12th centuries Romanesque exterior

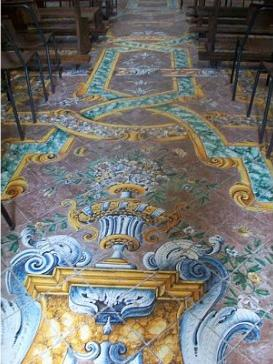
The interior features a maiolica tiled floor.

The Church of San Giovanni Battista (Italian: Chiesa di San Giovanni Battista) is a church located in the center of Praiano, a small comune located on the Amalfi Coast in southern Italy. Constructed in the Romanesque style, San Giovanni Battista has a rectangular plan and a vaulted ceiling, featuring Italian Baroque design elements on the inside. Dating back to the 11th–12th centuries, the church features a very well preserved maiolica flora- and fauna-inspired tiled floor and a pipe organ from Neapolitan organ masters.

Located on a narrow lane, Via San Giovanni, from which it gets its name, San Giovanni Battista was once the main church of the surrounding area; however as the settlement grew in size, eight more churches were subsequently built. The first legal mention of the church was in a 1296 bill of sale, belonging to the patronage of a couple Amalfi families.
