= Sorrento Peninsula =

Peninsula in southern Italy

Coordinates: 40.6246°N 14.4168°E

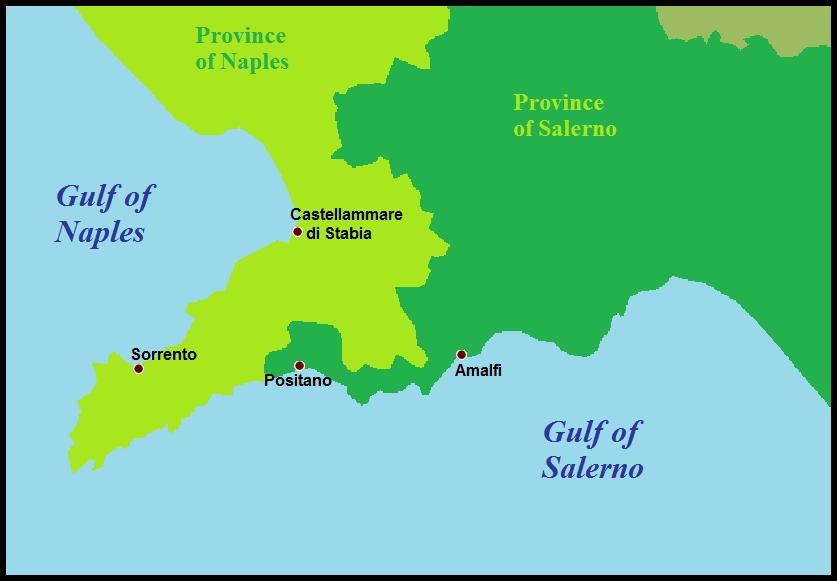
Map of the Sorrentine Peninsula

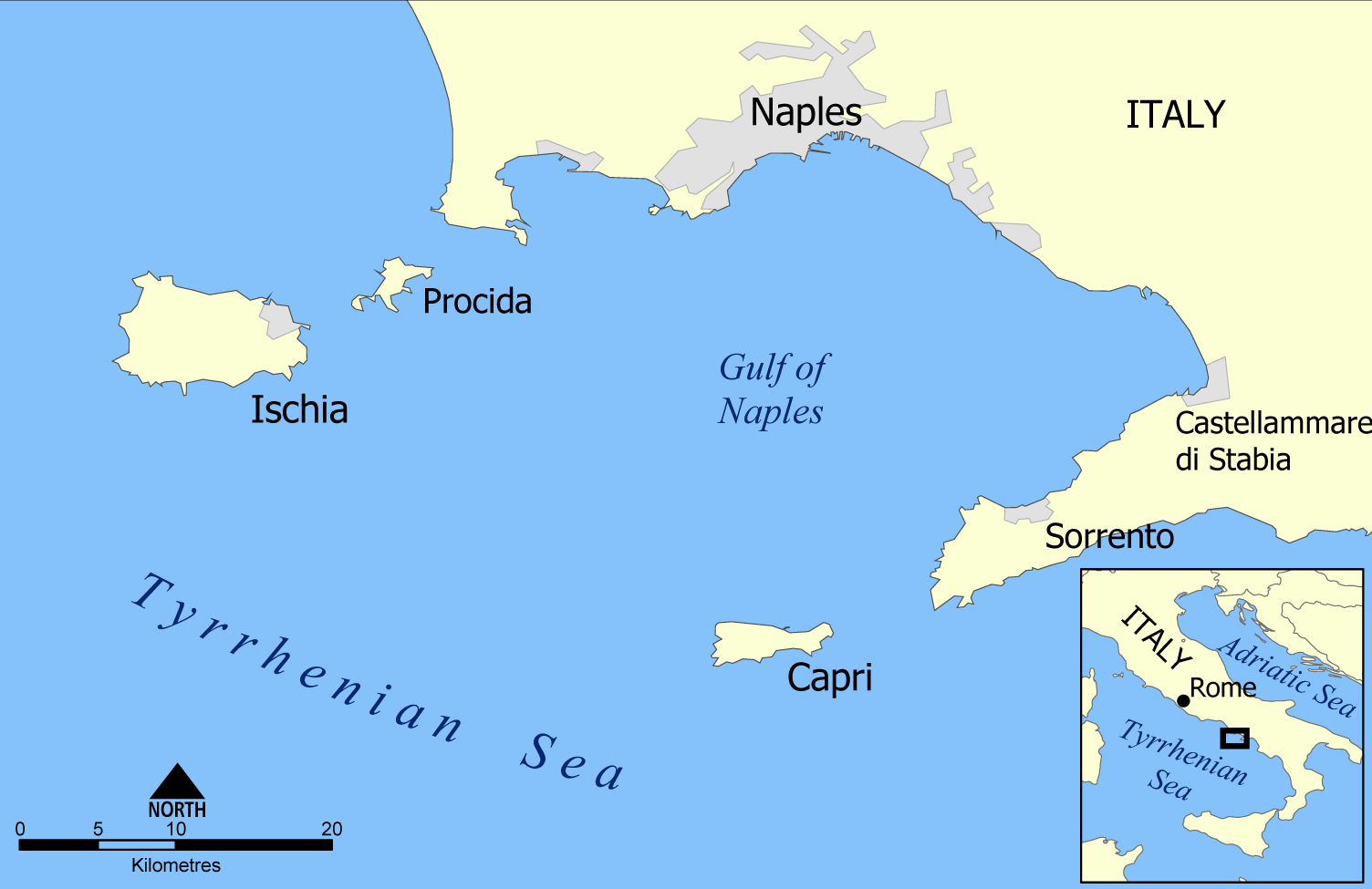
Map of the Gulf of Naples

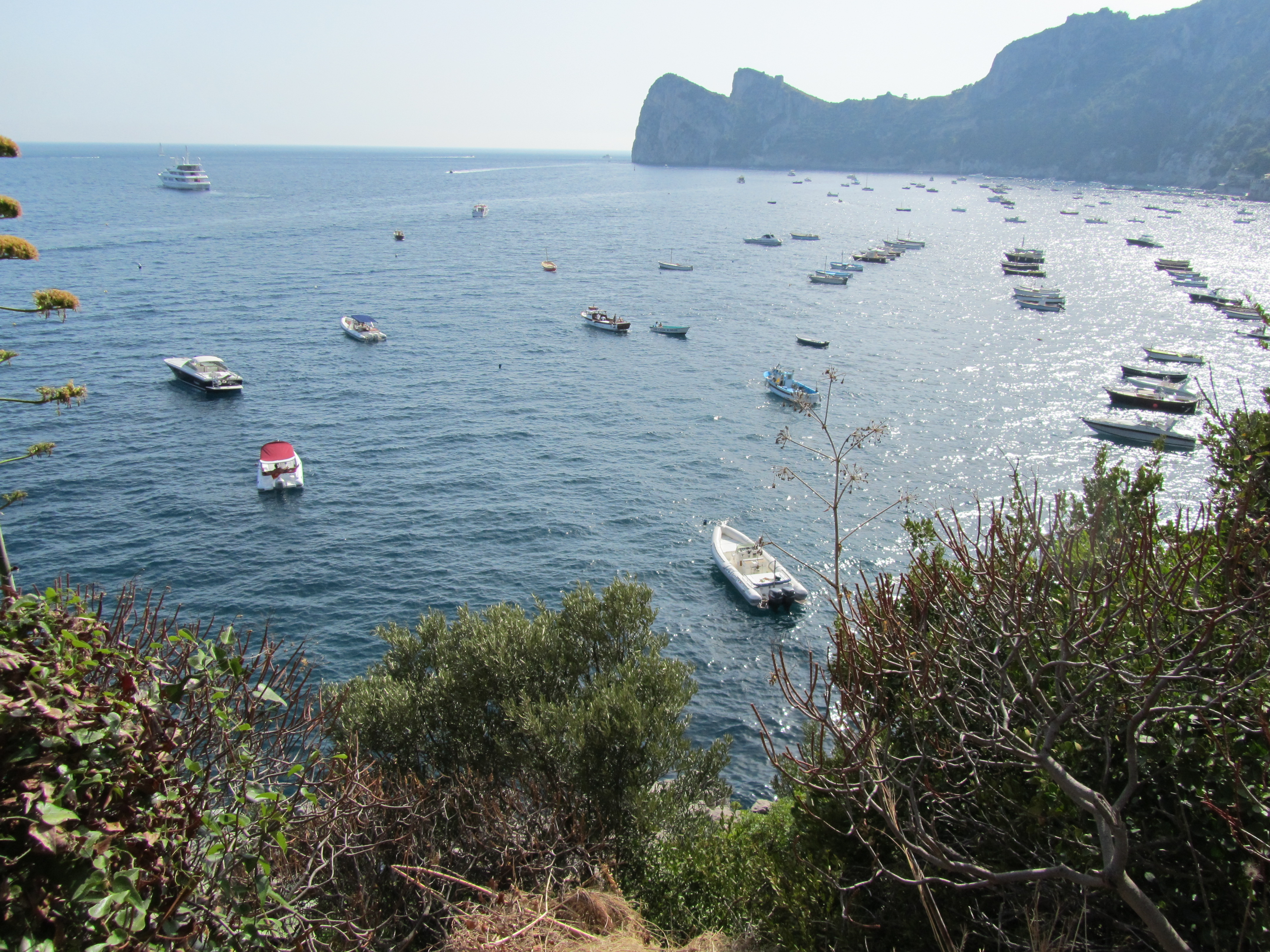
View of the peninsula near Massa Lubrense

The Sorrento Peninsula or Sorrentine Peninsula is a peninsula located in southern Italy which separates the Gulf of Naples to the north from the Gulf of Salerno to the south.

== Geography ==
=== Overview ===
The peninsula is named after its main town, Sorrento, which is located on the north (Gulf of Naples) coast. The Amalfi Coast is located on the southern side. The Lattari Mountains form the geographical backbone of the peninsula. The island of Capri lies off the western tip of the peninsula in the Tyrrhenian Sea. The whole area is an important tourist destination.

=== Municipalities ===
9 comunes of the peninsula are in the territory of the province of Naples and 12 comunes are in the province of Salerno.

Map of the Sorrentine Peninsula, showing municipalities in the provinces of Naples (NA) and Salerno (SA)

Province	Comune	Population (inh.)	Area (km^{2})	Total (km^{2})
Napoli	Agerola	7,399	19.62	121.14
Napoli	Castellammare di Stabia	64,533	17.71	121.14
Napoli	Massa Lubrense	13,914	19.71	121.14
Napoli	Meta	8,010	2.50	121.14
Napoli	Piano di Sorrento	13,057	7.50	121.14
Napoli	Pimonte	6,052	12.00	121.14
Napoli	Sant'Agnello	9,010	4.09	121.14
Napoli	Sorrento	16,616	9.93	121.14
Napoli	Vico Equense	21,006	29.30	121.14
Salerno	Amalfi	5,345	6.15	70.99
Salerno	Atrani	914	0.20	70.99
Salerno	Cetara	2,345	4.91	70.99
Salerno	Conca dei Marini	734	1.00	70.99
Salerno	Furore	859	1.73	70.99
Salerno	Maiori	5,649	16.00	70.99
Salerno	Minori	2,864	2.00	70.99
Salerno	Positano	3,981	8.00	70.99
Salerno	Praiano	2,069	2.00	70.99
Salerno	Ravello	2,477	7.00	70.99
Salerno	Scala	1,551	13.00	70.99
Salerno	Vietri sul Mare	8,328	9.00	70.99

== Transportation ==
=== Airports ===
The nearest airports are:

- Naples International (NAP)
- Salerno Costa d'Amalfi (QSR)

== See also ==
- Amalfi Coast
- Capri
- Gulf of Naples
- Gulf of Salerno
- Monti Lattari
- Punta Campanella Lighthouse
- Sant'Agata sui Due Golfi
- Sirenuse
- Southern Italy
