= Gragnano =

- Comune
- Comune di Gragnano
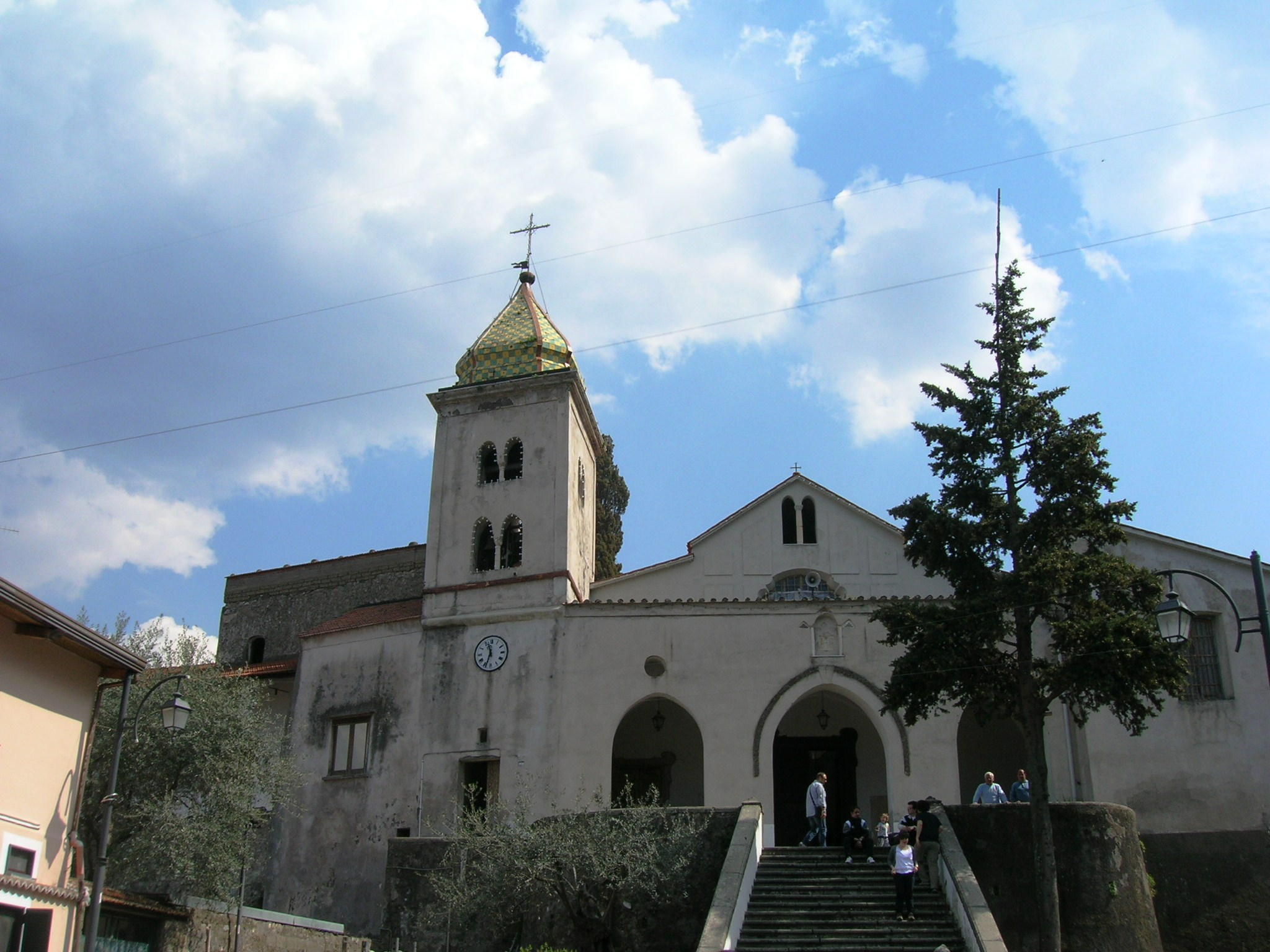
- Church of Santa Maria of the Assumption

- Location within Italy Location within Campania
- Coordinates: 40°41′N 14°31′E
- Country: Italy
- Region: Campania
- Metropolitan city: Naples (NA)
- Frazioni: Aurano, Caprile, Castello, Iuvani

Government
  - Mayor: Paolo Cimmino

Area
  - Total: 14.6 km^{2} (5.6 sq mi)
- Elevation: 141 m (463 ft)

Population (31 June 2015)
  - Total: 29,310
  - Density: 2,010/km^{2} (5,200/sq mi)
- Demonym: Gragnanesi
- Time zone: UTC+1 (CET)
  - Summer (DST): UTC+2 (CEST)
- Postal code: 80054
- Dialing code: 081
- Patron saint: Saint Sebastian
- Saint day: January 20
- Website: Official website

Gragnano is a hill town and comune (municipality) in the Metropolitan City of Naples, in southern Italian region of Campania. It is located about 30 kilometres (19 miles) southeast of Naples, between a mountain crest and the Amalfi Coast.

Gragnano borders the following municipalities: Agerola, Casola di Napoli, Castellammare di Stabia, Lettere, Pimonte, Ravello, Sant'Antonio Abate, Santa Maria la Carità, Scala.

In 1169 its name was added to the title of the bishopric of nearby Lettere, which was thus renamed Roman Catholic Diocese of Lettere-Gragnano, but Gragnano never had a co-cathedral and its title was dropped when the suppressed see was nominally restored as titular bishopric of Lettere.

== Pasta ==
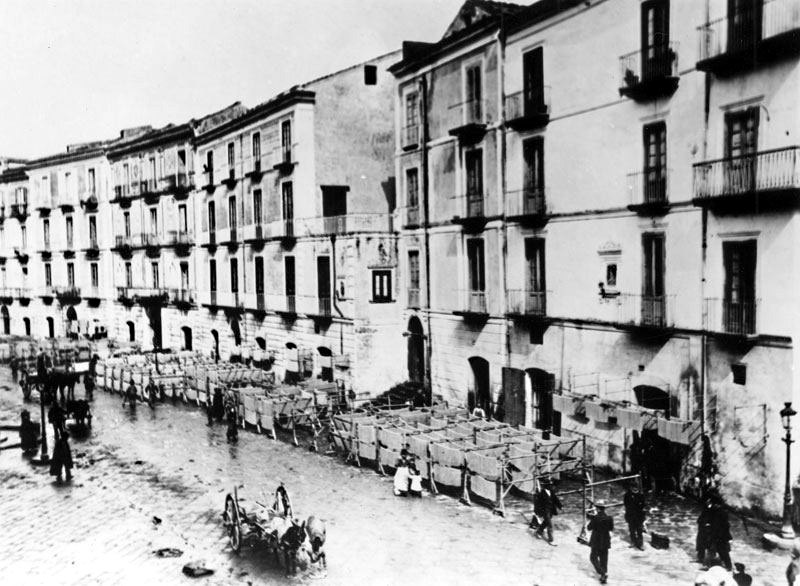
Via Roma in Gragnano, c. 1900

According to the local population, Gragnano is Italy's capital of pasta. Gragnano is home of some of the best dried pasta in Italy. In 2013, Gragnano pasta was designated a Protected Geographical Indication by the European Union.

Gragnano's "main street was laid out expressly to capture the mountain breeze mixed with sea air back when pasta makers hung spaghetti on drying rods like laundry," according to a Forbes Life write up. More recently heaters have been used to dry the pasta at low temperatures (approximately 50 °C (122 °F)) for two days and it is shaped with bronze to give it a rough texture, producing a pasta with a "nuttier aroma and chewier mouth feel."

== Notable locals ==
- Margherita Sarrocchi (c. 1560 – 1617), an Italian poet and a supporter of the theories of Galileo Galilei
- Tito Vuolo (1893–1962), an actor, was born there.
- Giuseppe Beotti (1912–1944), an Italian Catholic priest murdered by Nazi soldiers
- Antonio Buscè (born 1975), an Italian former footballer with 547 club caps
- Gennaro Scognamiglio (born 1987), an Italian footballer with over 400 club caps

== Sources and external links ==
Media related to Gragnano, Campania at Wikimedia Commons

- Official website
- "Gragnano" . Encyclopædia Britannica. Vol. XI (9th ed.). 1880. p. 32.
