= Praiano =

- Comune
- Comune di Praiano
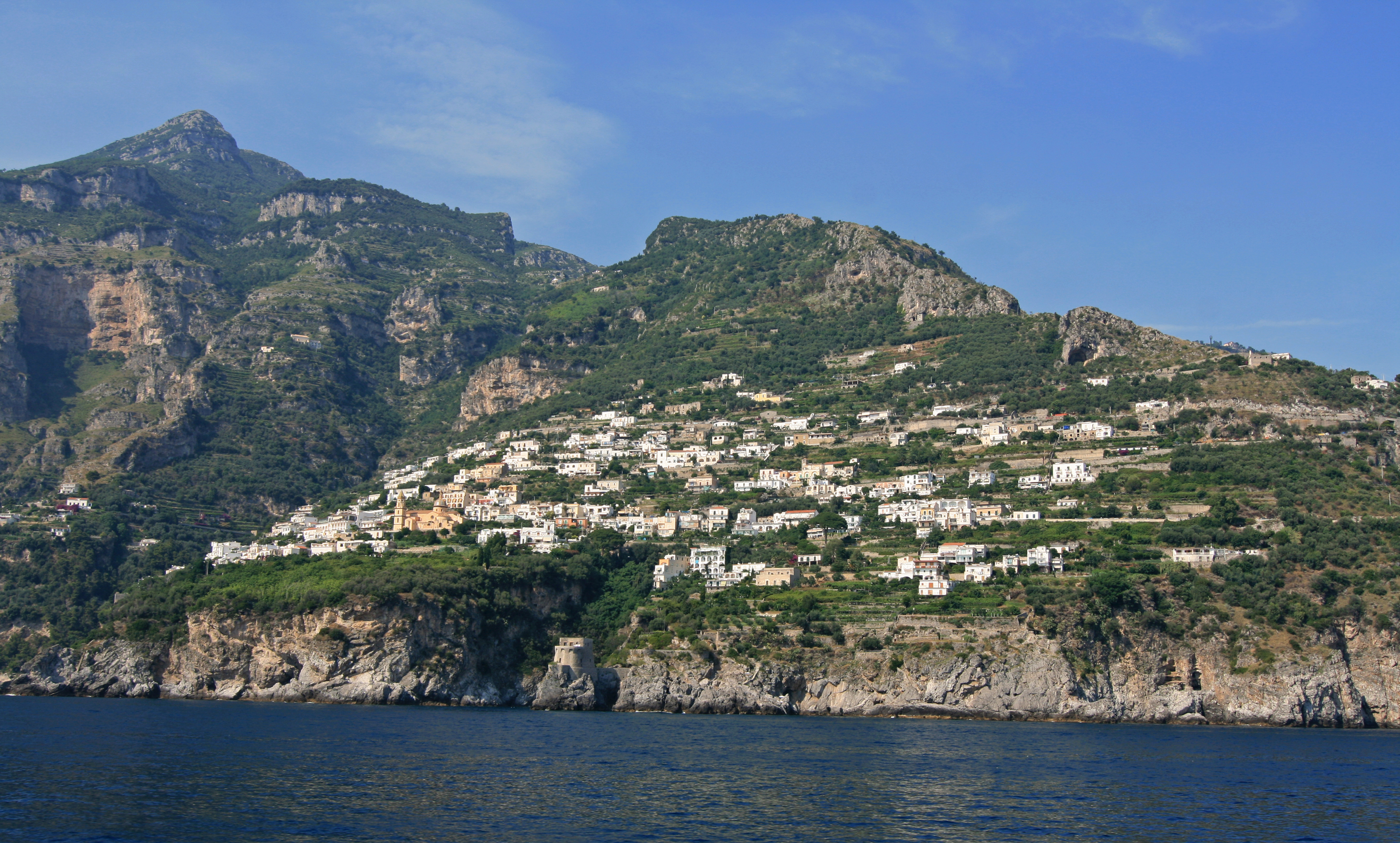
- View of Vettica Maggiore, a frazione of Praiano.

- Coat of arms

- Location within Italy Location within Campania
- Coordinates: 40°37′N 14°32′E
- Country: Italy
- Region: Campania
- Province: Salerno (SA)
- Frazioni: Vettica Maggiore

Government
  - Mayor: Giovanni Di Martino (Lista Civica)

Area
  - Total: 2 km^{2} (0.77 sq mi)

Population (31 December 2017)
  - Total: 2,019
  - Density: 1,000/km^{2} (2,600/sq mi)
- Demonym: Praianesi
- Time zone: UTC+1 (CET)
  - Summer (DST): UTC+2 (CEST)
- Postal code: 84010
- Dialing code: 089
- Patron saint: St. Januarius and St. Luke
- Saint day: 19 September and 18 October
- Website: Official website
- Interactive map of Praiano

UNESCO World Heritage Site
- Part of: Costiera Amalfitana
- Criteria: Cultural: (ii)(iv)
- Reference: 830
- Inscription: 1997 (21st Session)
- Area: 11,206 ha (27,690 acres)
- Buffer zone: 11,857 ha (29,300 acres)

Praiano (Italian pronunciation: [praˈjaːno]) is a town and comune of the province of Salerno in the Campania region of southwest Italy. It is situated on the Amalfi Coast (Costiera Amalfitana), a prime tourist location for the region and Italy alike, between the towns of Amalfi and Positano.

In 1997, the Amalfi Coast, including Praiano's "Vettica Maggiore" frazione was inscribed as UNESCO World Heritage Site. According to data of the year 2015, the town's population constitutes 2,045 inhabitants.

== History ==
The town's name derives from the praia, or beach, from the Latin word pelagium, meaning "open sea." During the 10th-11th centuries, Praiano was once the summer residence of the doges of the Duchy of Amalfi.

During the Angevin period, a fortified tower, the Assiola, was constructed to defend the town. Praiano had an important local silk industry, however, it disappeared during the 19th century. With the discovery of corals in the vicinity around the 1800s, Praiano's economy was revitalized, mainly focusing on the fishing and tourism industries ever since.

== Main sights ==
Attractions include the Church of San Luca Evangelista, dating back to 1123. On the inside, there are paintings by Renaissance painter Giovanni Bernardo Lama dating to the 16th century. Another attraction is the Church of San Giovanni Battista, featuring a well-preserved maiolica tiled floor, dating back to the 12th-13th centuries.

== See also ==
- Amalfi Coast
- Sorrentine Peninsula
