= Amalfi Coast =

Coastal area in the Campania region, Italy

UNESCO World Heritage Site
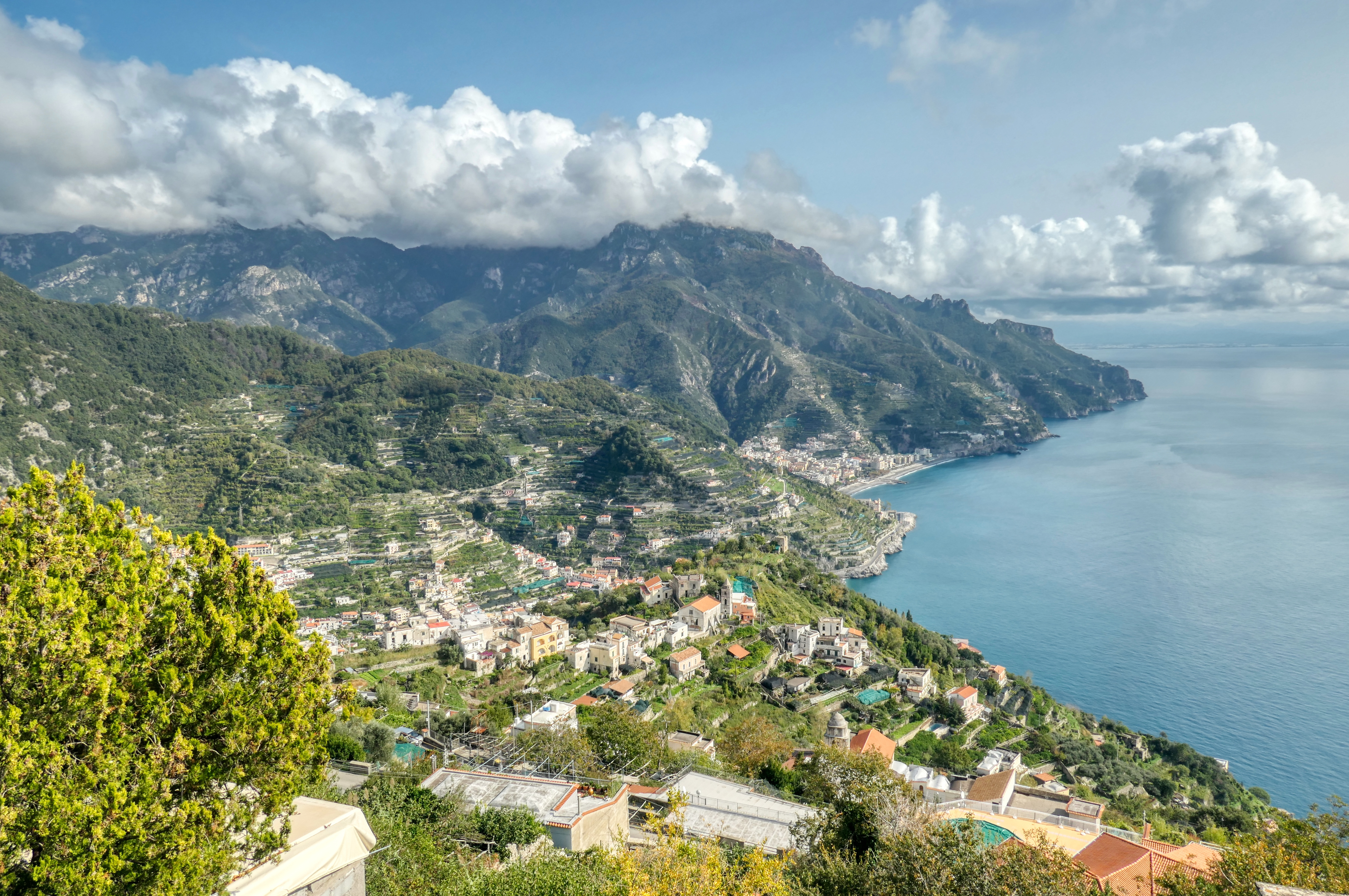
- Coastline from Ravello

- Location within Italy
- Official name: Costiera Amalfitana
- Location: Campania, Italy
- Criteria: Cultural: (ii), (iv), (v)
- Reference: 830
- Inscription: 1997 (21st Session)
- Area: 11,231 ha (43.36 sq mi)
- Coordinates: 40°39′N 14°36′E

The Amalfi Coast (Italian: Costiera amalfitana [koˈstjɛːra amalfiˈtaːna] or Costa d'Amalfi) is a stretch of coastline overlooking the Tyrrhenian Sea and the Gulf of Salerno. It is located in the Province of Salerno, in the Campania region of southern Italy, south of the Sorrentine Peninsula and north of the Cilentan Coast.

A UNESCO World Heritage Site since 1997, it is one of Italy's most popular seaside destinations. It is named after the town of Amalfi, which has historically been its main geographical and political hub.

== History ==
During the 10th–11th centuries, the Duchy of Amalfi existed on the territory of the Amalfi Coast, centred in the town of Amalfi. The Amalfi coast was later controlled by the Principality of Salerno until Amalfi was sacked by the Republic of Pisa in 1137.

== Geography ==
Map of Amalfi Coast

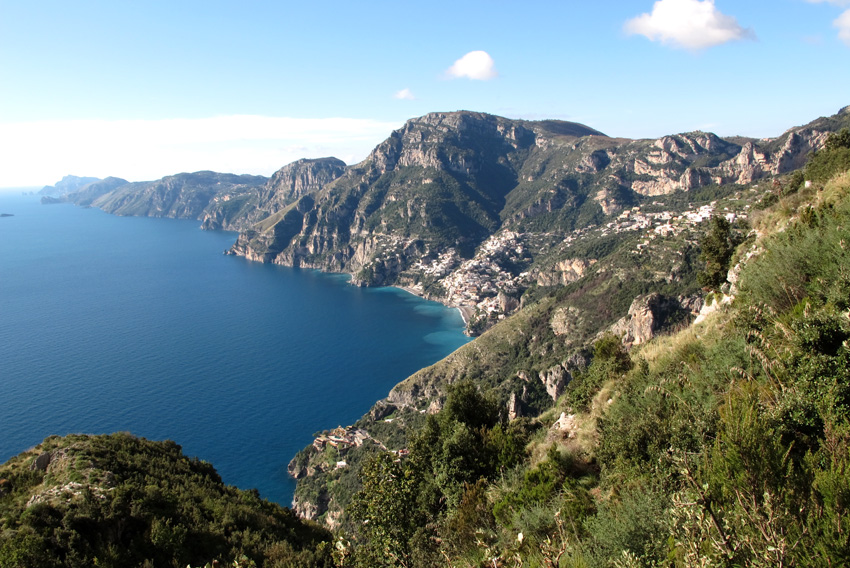
View toward Positano from Praiano

Like the rest of the region, the Amalfi Coast has a Mediterranean climate, featuring warm summers and mild winters. It is located on the relatively steep southern shore of the Sorrentine Peninsula, leaving little room for rural and agricultural development. The only land route to the Amalfi Coast is the 40 kilometres (25 mi) long Amalfi Drive (Strada Statale 163) which runs along the coastline from the town of Vietri sul Mare in the east to Positano in the west. Thirteen municipalities are located on the Amalfi Coast, many of them centred on tourism.

=== Municipalities ===
| Municipality | Frazioni | Attractions |
|---|---|---|
| Vietri sul Mare | Albori, Benincasa, Dragonea, (Note: Includes the localities of Iaconti and San Vincenzo) Molina, Raito | Church of Saint John Baptist |
| Cetara | Fuenti | Tower of Cetara |
| Maiori | Erchie, Ponteprimario, San Pietro, Santa Maria delle Grazie, Vecite | Collegiata di Santa Maria, Castle of San Nicola de Thoro-Plano (closed until further notice), Santa Maria de Olearia |
| Tramonti | Campinola, Capitignano, Cesarano, Corsano, Figlino, Gete, Novella, Paterno Sant'Arcangelo, Paterno Sant'Elia, Pietre, Polvica, (Note: Polvica is the municipal seat of Tramonti.) Ponte, Pucara | Conservatory of Pucara, Rupestrian Church in Gete |
| Minori | Montecita, Torre | Church of Santa Trofimena and the ancient Roman villa |
| Ravello | Casa Bianca, Castiglione, Marmorata, Sambuco, Torello | Villa Cimbrone, Villa Rufolo, San Giovanni del Toro, and the Duomo (Cathedral) |
| Scala | Campidoglio, Minuta, Pontone | Scala Cathedral |
| Atrani | none | Churches of San Salvatore del Birecto and Santa Maria Maddalena |
| Amalfi | Lone, Pastena, Pogerola, Tovere, Vettica Minore | Amalfi Cathedral, and its cloister (Italian: Chiostro del Paradiso) |
| Conca dei Marini | none | Main church of Saint John Baptist and the Emerald Grotto |
| Furore | Fiordo di Furore, Marina di Praia (Note: Partly included in the municipality of Praiano) | Fjord of Furore |
| Praiano | Vettica Maggiore | Churches of San Luca and San Gennaro and Saint John Baptist |
| Positano | Montepertuso, Nocelle | Church of Santa Maria Assunta |

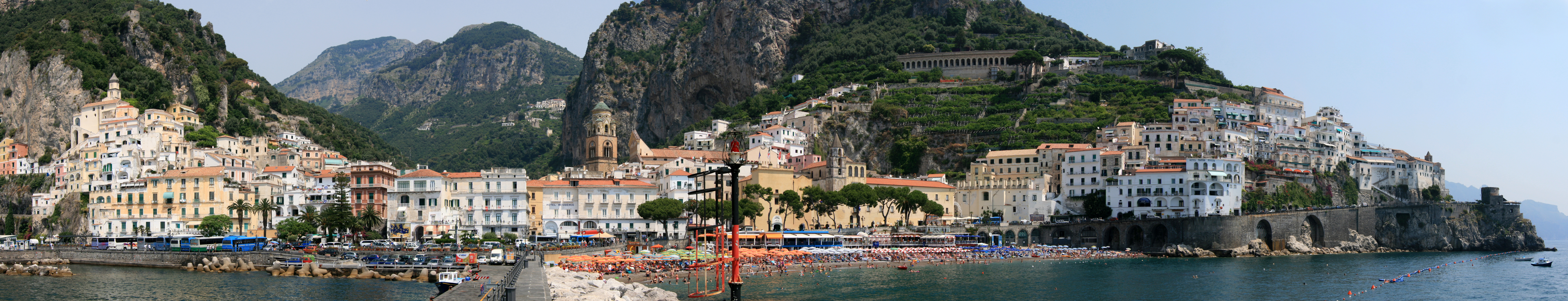
Panoramic view of the town of Amalfi seen from the pier with the Amalfi Cathedral in the center

== Economy ==
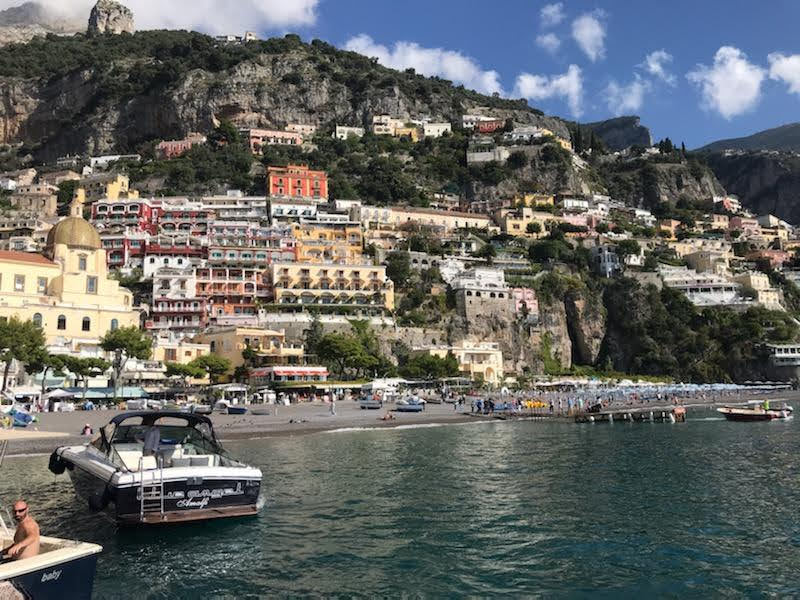
The beach at Positano

The Amalfi Coast is known for its production of limoncello liqueur, made between February and October from lemon (Italian: sfusato amalfitano) grown in terraced gardens along the entire coastline. Another typical liqueur is concerto (literally, "concert", derived from the mix of herbs that compose it), a dark rosolio with spicy notes typically produced in Tramonti. Amalfi is also a known maker of a hand-made thick paper called bambagina, symbolic of Italy's traditional technique for paper production and historically used for private writings, legal acts, and revenue stamps. Other notable local products are a particular kind of anchovy (local Italian: alici) from Cetara and the colourful handmade ceramics from Vietri.

== Transport ==
Buses and ferries run along the Amalfi Coast, as well as boat excursions from Positano and Amalfi.

=== Airport ===
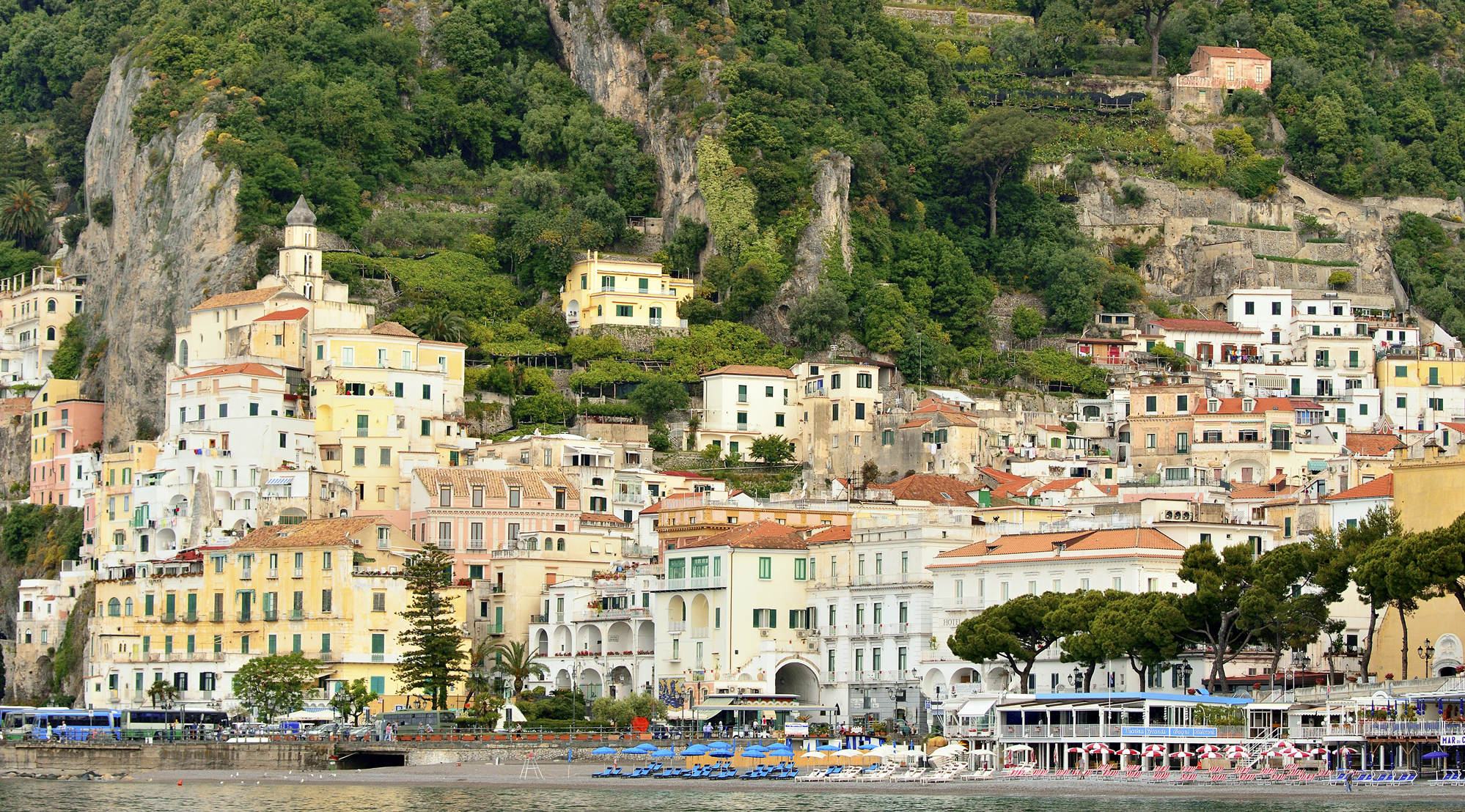
Amalfi from a tour boat

The Salerno Costa d'Amalfi Airport is the nearest airport to the coast, however, Naples International Airport (Napoli-Capodichino) serves the main international gateway airport to reach the area from abroad.

== In popular culture ==
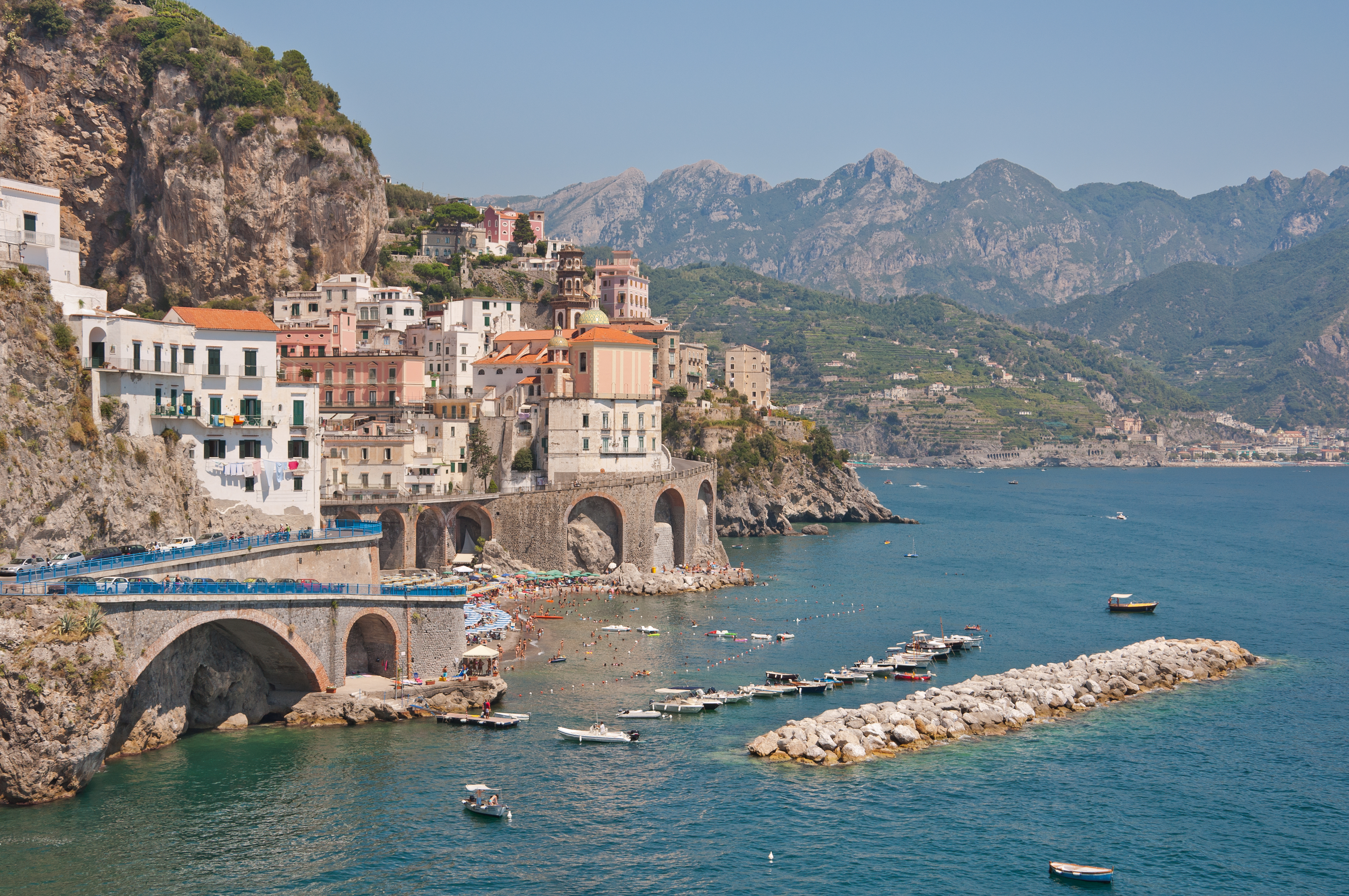
View of Atrani from the coast

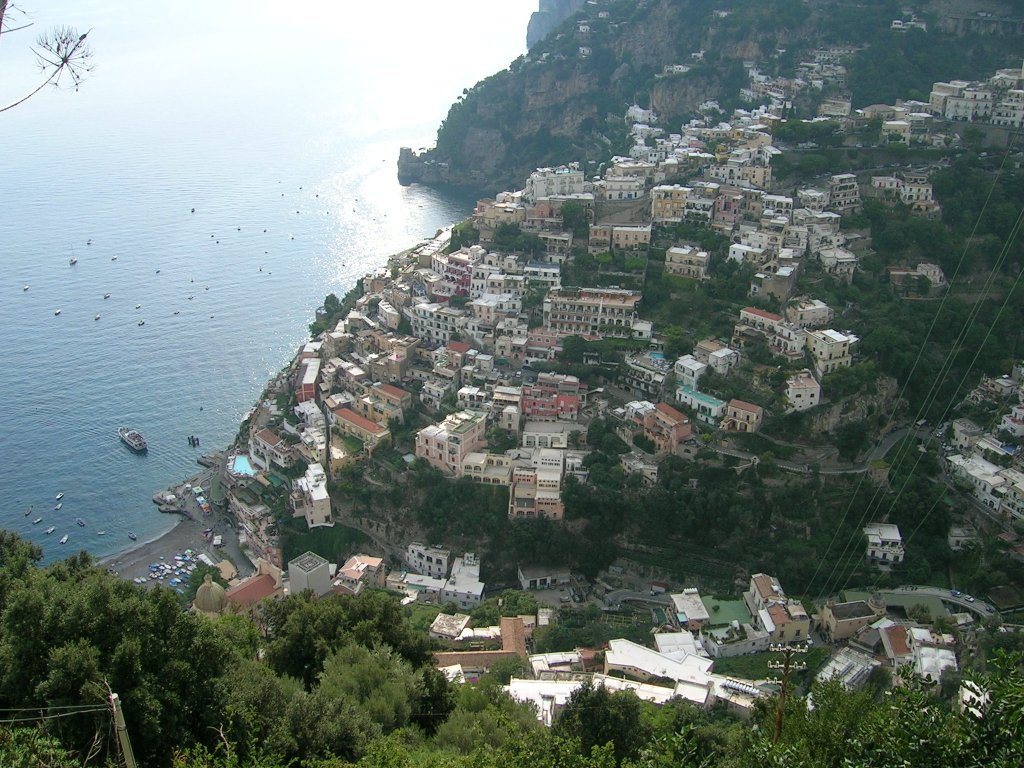
Panoramic view of Positano

The natural beauty and picturesque landscapes of the Amalfi Coast have made it one of the most popular destinations of the world's jet set, earning it the nickname of "Divine Coast" (Divina costiera).

The rulers of Amalfi are the central figures in John Webster's Jacobean tragedy The Duchess of Malfi. The Dutch artist M. C. Escher produced a number of artworks of the Amalfi coast, and Spike Milligan describes his time in Amalfi during a period of leave in the fourth part of his war memoirs, Mussolini: His Part in My Downfall.

The Amalfi Coast was used for scenes of Federico Fellini's 1972 film Roma and for the 2017 American superhero film Wonder Woman, where it was depicted as the Amazon island of Themyscira. It was also seen in the 2025 Hindi feature film War 2.

The Amalfi Coast serves as a setting for fictional racetracks in the Forza Motorsport 3, Forza Motorsport 4 and Gran Turismo 4. It also plays host to the fictional town of Sapienza in Hitman.

The city of Positano is featured in John Steinbeck's 1953 short story "Positano". The city is also featured in Under the Tuscan Sun, Christopher Nolan's Tenet, and the Kath and Kim movie Kath & Kimderella.

== See also ==
- Cilentan Coast, located on the Gulf of Salerno's southern shore
- Amalfi
