= Positano =

Positano Pusitano (Neapolitan)
- Comune
- Comune di Positano
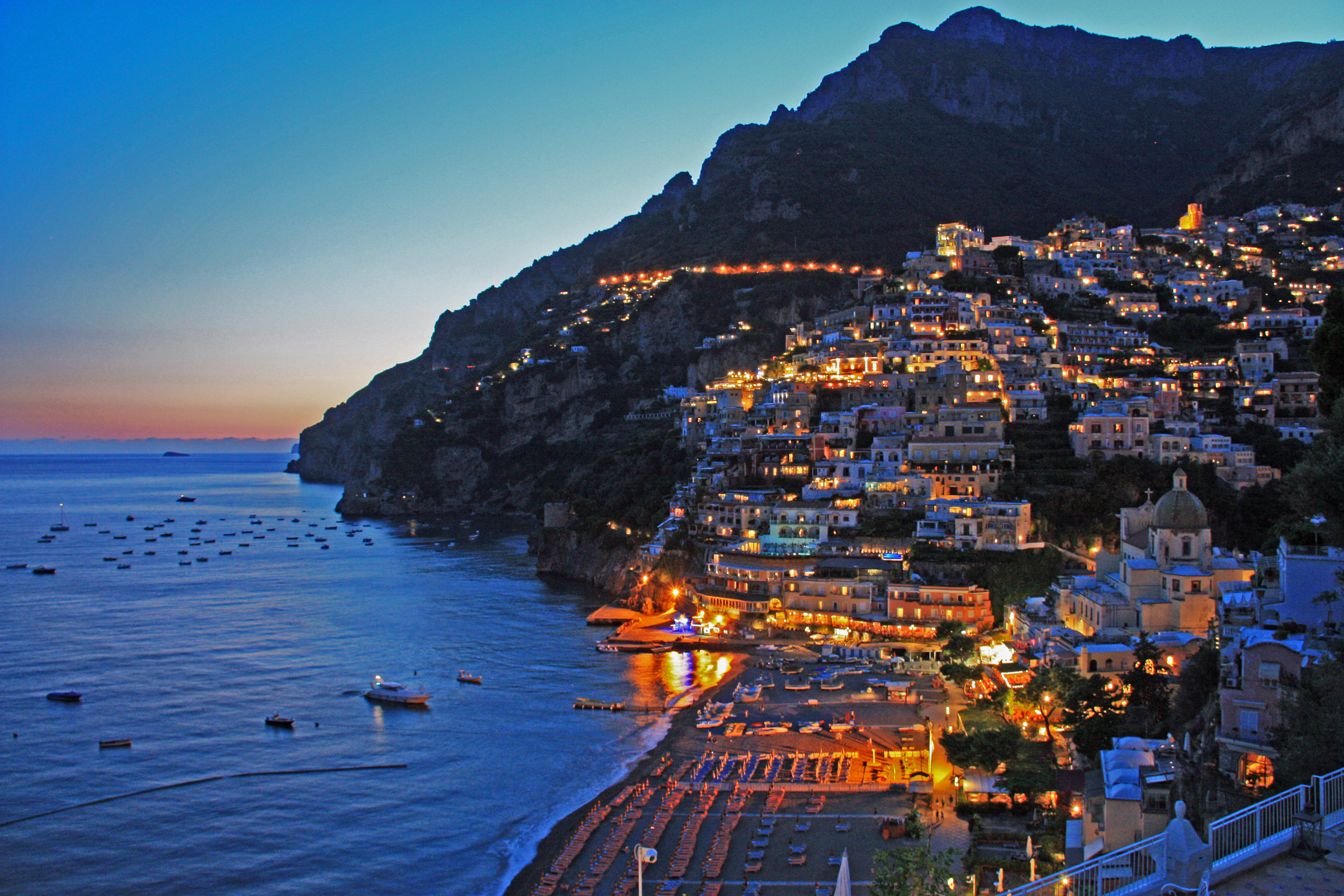
- View of Positano at sunset

- Positano within the Province of Salerno

- Location within Italy Location within Campania
- Coordinates: 40°38′N 14°29′E
- Country: Italy
- Region: Campania
- Province: Salerno (SA)
- Frazioni: Montepertuso, Nocelle

Government
  - Mayor: Giuseppe Guida (Ind.)

Area
  - Total: 8.65 km^{2} (3.34 sq mi)
- Elevation: 0 m (0 ft)

Population (2026)
  - Total: 3,643
  - Density: 421/km^{2} (1,090/sq mi)
- Demonym: Positanesi
- Time zone: UTC+1 (CET)
  - Summer (DST): UTC+2 (CEST)
- Postal code: 84017
- Dialing code: 089
- Patron saint: St. Vitus
- Saint day: June 15
- Website: Official website

UNESCO World Heritage Site
- Part of: Costiera Amalfitana
- Criteria: Cultural: (ii)(iv)
- Reference: 830
- Inscription: 1997 (21st Session)
- Area: 11,206 ha (27,690 acres)
- Buffer zone: 11,857 ha (29,300 acres)

Positano (Italian: [poziˈtaːno]; Neapolitan: Pusitano [pusiˈtɑːnə]) is a town and comune (municipality) on the Amalfi Coast in the Province of Salerno in the region of Campania in southern Italy, mainly in an enclave in the hills leading down to the coast. It has 3,643 inhabitants.

== History ==
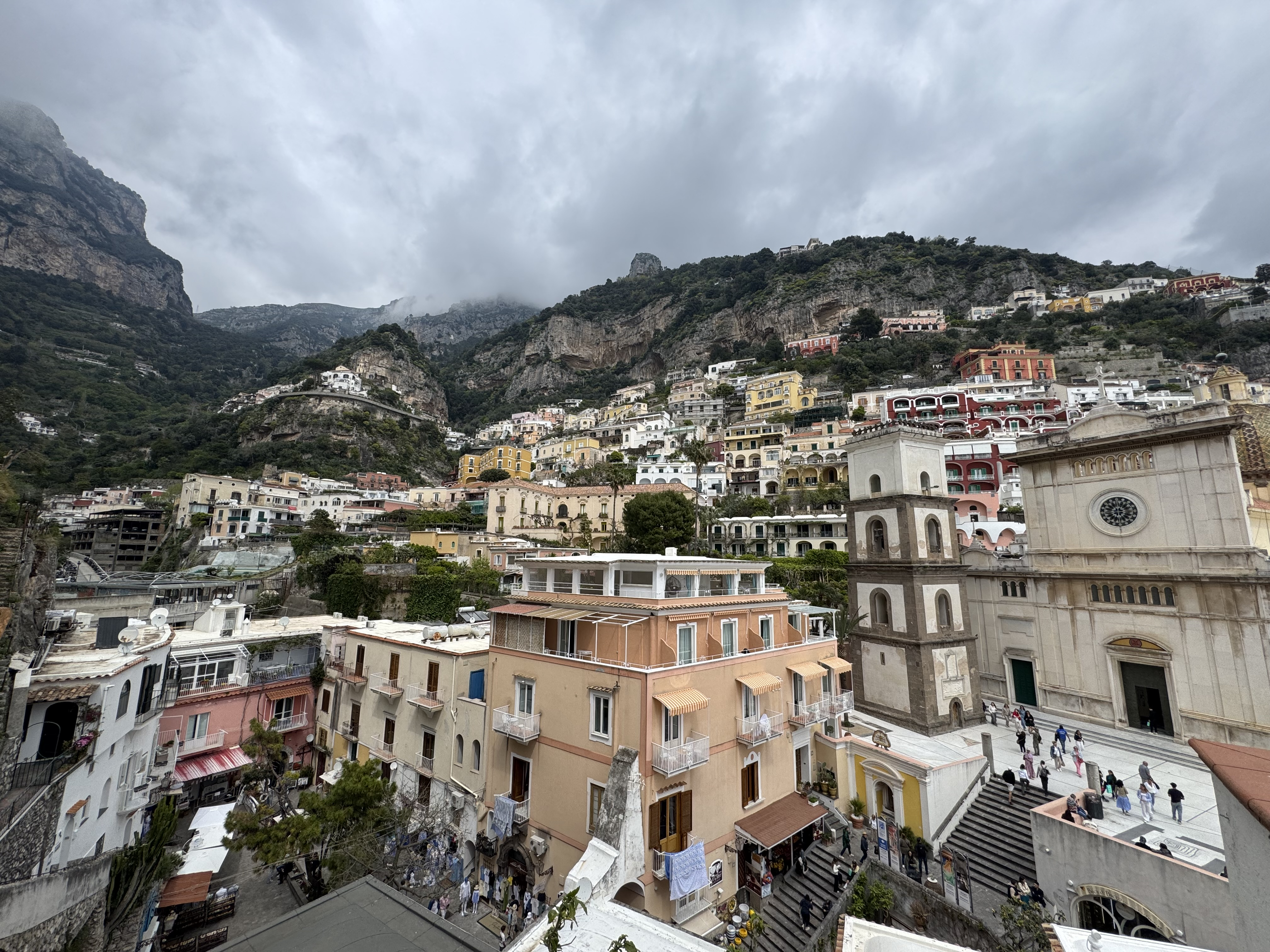
Panoramic view of Positano in 2025

The first evidence of a settlement in Positano dates back to the Upper Palaeolithic, when the "Grotto La Porta" was frequented by gatherers and hunters. This small cave is located at 120 m. o.s.l. and at 10 m. on the highway. In 1955, Antonio M. Radmilli (University of Pisa) organized several surveys to identify prehistoric visits, both on the surface and in some caves. During the excavations, several fossils emerged, some of which are malacological like shells of molluscs, while the fauna is represented by the remains of mammals (wild boar, ibex, deer and roe deer), birds, amphibians and fish. The findings made it to be assumed that the people who frequented the caves had an economy based mainly on the collection of molluscs, while hunting for birds and mammals was rather marginal.

=== Roman era ===
The first archaeological evidence dates back to the first century BC, when luxurious Roman villas were built on the coast of the Sorrento Peninsula. Romans began settling at Positano around 100 B.C. In Positano, one occupied the bay and the other extended on the island of the Long Rooster, "a typical example of how even more hidden spaces of a wild coast were used in the Claudian age without even respecting the rocks that, according to legend, would have served as the home of the sirens". These villas belong to the "dispersed type", that is, formed by different structures not grouped together, delimited by gardens. The names of the owners are not yet known, but they are certainly elitist contexts. The Villa di Positano was described for the first time by Karl Weber in 1758, who then oversaw the excavations in Herculaneum and Pompeii. At the beginning of the 1900s, Mingazzini and Pfister carried out some essays to better understand the structure of both the bay of Positano and the Gallo Lungo. Maiuri describes some remains, still visible in the 1960s, as a peristilium of stuccoed brick columns. The complex has been the subject of systematic excavations since 2003, which have affected the area below the Oratory of the Santa Maria Assunta Church and, the site was inaugurated on 18 July 2018, with the name of MAR (Roman Archaeological Museum) Santa Maria Assunta Positano.

=== Modern era ===
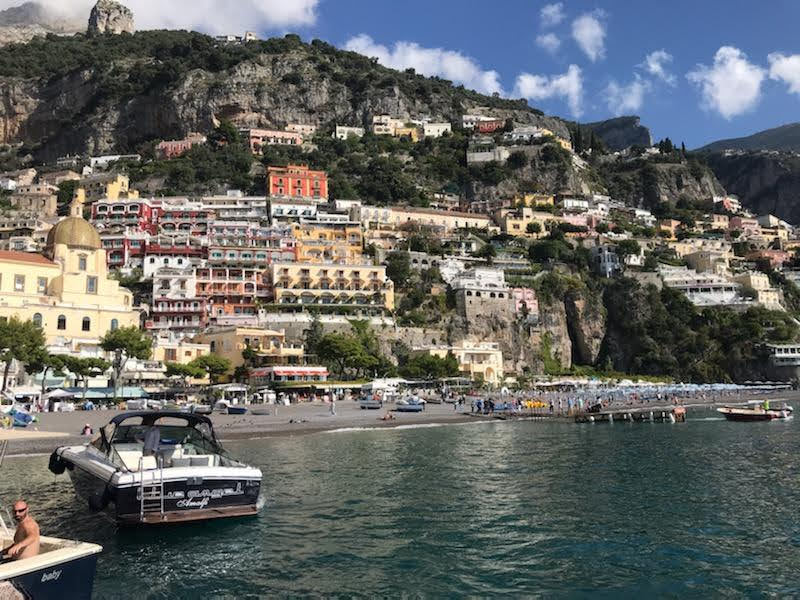
The beach at Positano

Positano became a wealthy market port from the 15th to 17th century and has only continued to grow in popularity over time. Back then they traded food such as fish and other resources.

Positano was a port of the Amalfi Republic in medieval times, and prospered during the sixteenth and seventeenth centuries. By the mid-nineteenth century, however, the town had fallen on hard times. More than half the population emigrated, mostly to America.

Positano was a relatively poor fishing village during the first half of the twentieth century. It began to attract large number of tourists in the 1950s, especially after John Steinbeck published his essay about Positano in Harper's Bazaar in May 1953: "Positano Bites Deep". Steinbeck wrote, "It is a dream place that isn't quite real when you are there and becomes beckoningly real after you have gone."

== Geography ==
Positano’s physical geography is defined by its steep, cliffside setting along the Amalfi Coast, where pastel-colored buildings appear to cascade down toward the Tyrrhenian Sea. The town is built on rugged limestone slopes of the Lattari Mountains, creating a "vertical village" layout with narrow stairways and terraced homes. Its terrain rises quickly from sea level to elevations over 400 meters, limiting expansion but enhancing its dramatic beauty. The area features Mediterranean vegetation like olive trees, lemon groves, and pines, thriving under a warm, dry summer climate and mild winters. Beaches such as Spiaggia Grande and Fornillo nestle in coves at the base of steep cliffs, accessible only by footpaths or boat.

=== Climate ===
The climate of Positano is very mild, of the Mediterranean type; the winters are very warm with minimum temperatures that almost never fall below 6 °C (43 °F), while the summers are long, warm and sunny but often refreshed by the sea breeze. Thanks to the mild temperature and the beauty of the landscape, Positano has been a holiday resort since the time of the Roman Empire, as evidenced by the discovery of a villa in the bay. Typical are the many staircases that from the top of the village connect the upper districts with the valley area. The main beaches are Spiaggia Grande, Fornillo, La Porta, Fiumicello, Arienzo, San Pietro, Laurito and Remmese, some of which can also be reached by sea.

== Demographics ==
As of 2026, the population is 3,643, of which 48.8% are male, and 51.2% are female. Minors make up 13.5% of the population, and seniors make up 25.3%.

Historical population

Year	Pop.	±%
1861	2,705	—
1871	2,837	+4.9%
1881	2,615	−7.8%
1901	1,839	−29.7%
1911	1,809	−1.6%
1921	1,710	−5.5%
1931	1,744	+2.0%
1936	2,075	+19.0%

Year	Pop.	±%
1951	2,450	+18.1%
1961	2,788	+13.8%
1971	3,133	+12.4%
1981	3,488	+11.3%
1991	3,638	+4.3%
2001	3,882	+6.7%
2011	3,858	−0.6%
2021	3,772	−2.2%

Source: ISTAT

=== Immigration ===
As of 2025, immigrants make up 8.7% of the total population. The 5 largest foreign countries of birth are Ukraine, the United Kingdom, the United States, Brazil, and the Philippines.

== Main sights ==
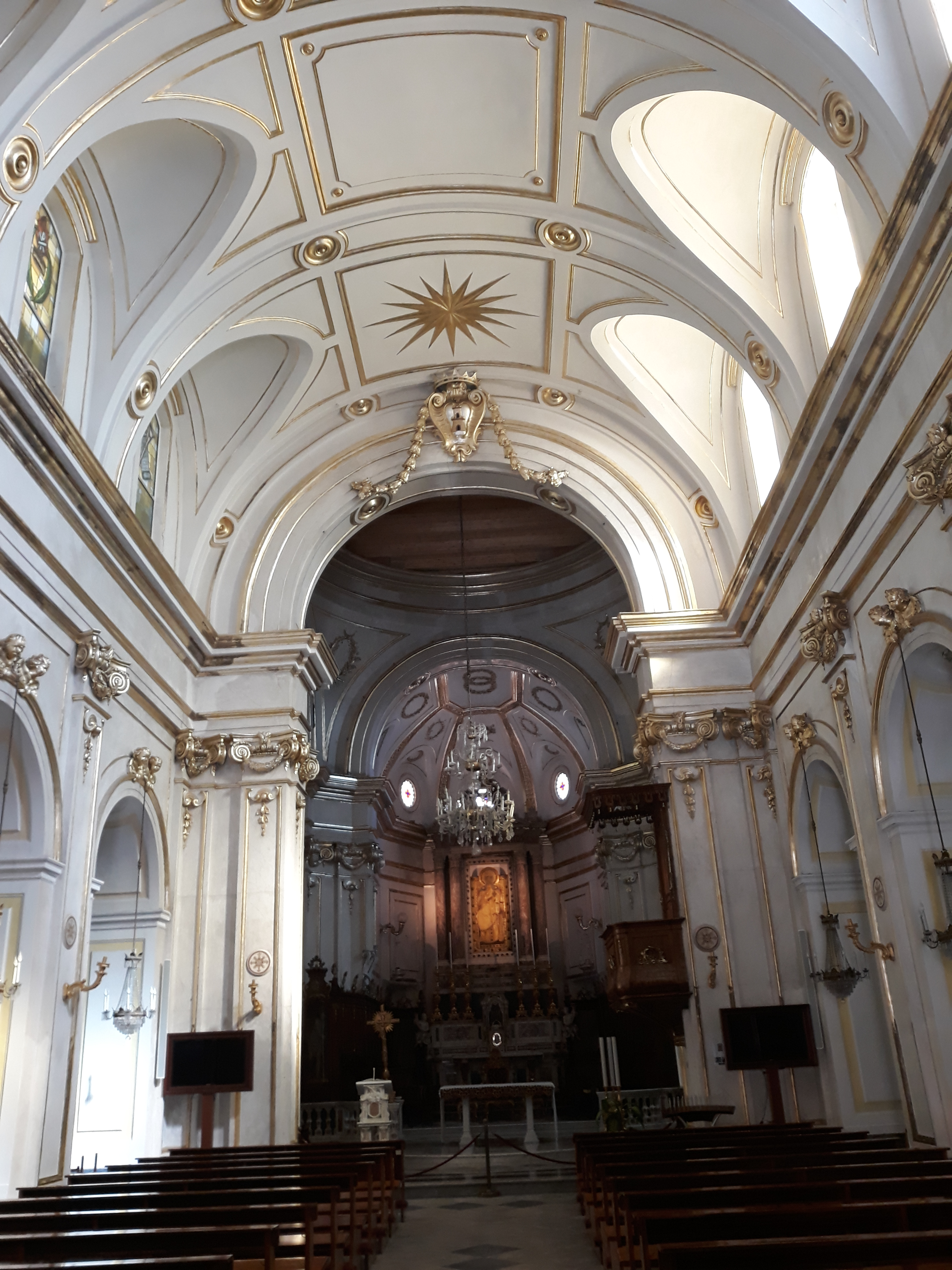
Church of Santa Maria Assunta

- The church of Santa Maria Assunta features a dome made of majolica tiles as well as a thirteenth-century Byzantine icon of a black Madonna. According to local legend, the icon had been stolen from Byzantium and was being transported by pirates across the Mediterranean. A storm had blown up in the waters opposite Positano and the frightened sailors heard a voice on board saying "Posa, posa!" ("Put down! Put down!"). The icon was unloaded and carried to the fishing village and the storm abated
- The Marina Grande beach is at the base of the cliff side town of Positano and is the most recognized beach in the town. Other popular beaches include Fornillo beach (the second largest beach in Positano) and Arienzo beach.
- MAR Positano (Roman Archaeological Museum) Santa Maria Assunta. The museum, inaugurated on 18 July 2018, is a museum-like archaeological site. The underground complex is divided into two crypts and a room of the Roman villa. The walls of the frescoed room from the imperial era are the only example of wall painting in Roman villas on the Amalfi Coast. The particularly bright colours are a peculiarity of the site. Further archaeological investigations are planned, aimed at the recovery of other rooms in the complex.

== In popular culture ==
Positano has been featured in several films, including Only You (1994), and Under the Tuscan Sun (2003), as well as more recently in Kath & Kimderella (2012) and being mentioned in the 2009 musical film Nine in the song "Cinema Italiano". It has also hosted the annual Cartoons on the Bay festival, at which Pulcinella Awards for excellence in animation are presented.

From July 1967 and through most of the 1970s, Positano was home to singer-songwriter Shawn Phillips and where most of his best-known work was composed. Mick Jagger and Keith Richards from The Rolling Stones wrote the song "Midnight Rambler" in the cafes of Positano while on vacation.

Director and producer Franco Zeffirelli owned the Villa Treville in Positano, where he took residence over a 35-year period and hosted a coterie of literati and stars of the stage and screen. He hired his friend, Renzo Mongiardino, who collaborated on many of his theater and opera projects, to design the interiors which reflect the local design sensibilities and craftsmanship. The Villa Treville has since been converted into a five-star boutique hotel.

German pianist Wilhelm Kempff made Positano his summer retreat and there he taught a summer course on the Beethoven piano sonatas and concerti. Since his death in 1991, the Beethoven Kurse has continued under the organization of the Wilhelm Kempff Kulturstiftung, having had as teachers Gerhard Oppitz and John O'Conor.

Today tourism is by far the major industry. Positano is also very popular for limoncello and "L'Albertissimo", an alcoholic tipple that can only be found at a small stall at the main harbor.

The town's rapid growth from a small fishing village to an international destination is credited to the rise of the tourism industry. In addition to the beaches, cliffs, and historic sites, clothing stores and restaurants are scattered throughout Positano, attracting tourists from around the world. To complete the picture, natural lemon, orange, and olive groves grow prominently across the cliffside town. The produce is often sold in fresh markets around the city.

The fictional town of "Mongibello" in the 1955 novel The Talented Mr. Ripley is based on Positano. The town and various villages on the islands of Ischia and Procida were used to represent Mongibello in a 1999 film based on the novel.

Positano is also home to football club A.S.D. San Vito Positano 1956, who play at Stadio Vittorio de Sica and compete in the Promozione Campania.

== Economy ==
Positano is an international tourist attraction and it is also called "città verticale" due to its peculiar conformation. Since 1997 Positano is part of Amalfi Coast; in fact it has been declared UNESCO World Heritage site.

== Education ==
The community has a main nursery and primary school, the Montepertuso nursery, the Montepertuso primary school, and a secondary school.

== Transport ==
Positano can be reached by the SS163 Amalfitana national road, or by the SP425 provincial road.

The nearest airports are the Napoli-Capodichino (NAP) and the Salerno-Pontecagnano Airport (QSR) and they have shuttle buses to destinations across the Amalfi Coast, including Positano.

Ferries link Positano to other towns including Capri, Naples, Salerno, and Sorrento for transportation.

The Sita bus links Positano to Amalfi and Sorrento.

== See also ==
- Amalfi Coast
- Li Galli
- Sorrentine Peninsula
