= Scala, Campania =

Scala
- Comune
- Comune di Scala
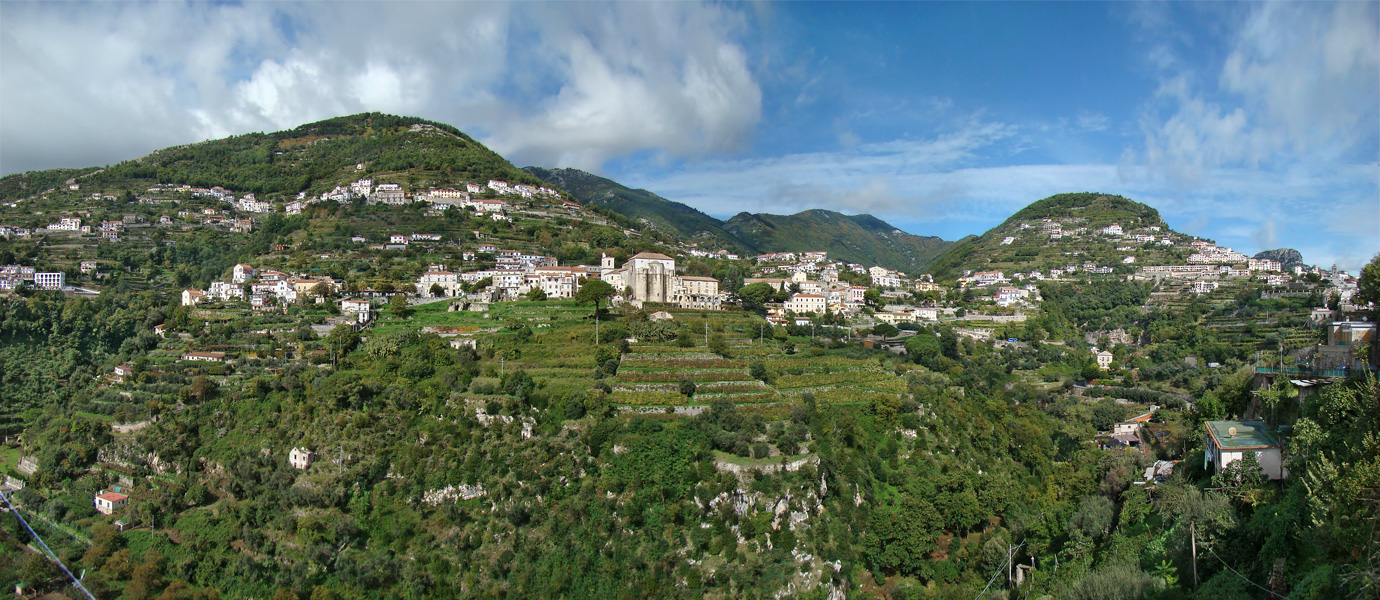
- Scala viewed from Ravello

- Location within Italy Location within Campania
- Coordinates: 40°39′N 14°36′E
- Country: Italy
- Region: Campania
- Province: Salerno (SA)
- Frazioni: San Pietro, Santa Caterina, Campidoglio, Minuta, Pontone

Government
  - Mayor: Luigi Mansi

Area
  - Total: 13.86 km^{2} (5.35 sq mi)
- Elevation: 360 m (1,180 ft)

Population (31 December 2017)
  - Total: 1,516
  - Density: 109.4/km^{2} (283.3/sq mi)
- Demonym: Scalesi
- Time zone: UTC+1 (CET)
  - Summer (DST): UTC+2 (CEST)
- Postal code: 84010
- Dialing code: 089
- Patron saint: St. Lawrence
- Saint day: August 10
- Website: Official website

UNESCO World Heritage Site
- Part of: Costiera Amalfitana
- Criteria: Cultural: (ii)(iv)
- Reference: 830
- Inscription: 1997 (21st Session)
- Area: 11,206 ha (27,690 acres)
- Buffer zone: 11,857 ha (29,300 acres)

Scala is a town and comune in the province of Salerno in the Campania region of south-western Italy. It is located on a rocky hill c. 400 m above sea-level and is part of the Amalfi Coast.

== History ==
According to an ancient and unproven tradition, it was founded by Roman shipwrecks travelling to Constantinople. In the Middle Ages Scala was, together with Ravello, the most important fortification of the Duchy of Amalfi. Its two castles (mentioned in a document of c. 1000 AD) were sacked by Robert Guiscard in 1073 and destroyed by the Pisane sixty years later. In 1210 the fate repeated with the troops of Otto IV and, in the late century, during the Sicilian Vespers.

The Congregation of the Most Holy Redeemer, commonly known as the Redemptorists, were founded in Scala by Saint Alphonsus Maria de' Liguori.

== Main sights ==
Scala is divided into six different hamlets with precise identities: from north to south, Santa Caterina, Campoleone, Campidoglio, Scala, Minuta and Pontone. Attractions include:

- Santa Caterina: Porta Urbana, church of Santa Caterina, chapels of St. Paul and Santa Maria della Porta
- Campoleone: church of San Pietro, in Angevine-Gothic style.
- Campidoglio: church of San Giovanni Battista, with a Moresque bell tower.
- The Duomo of Scala, modified in Baroque times. It has maintained the medieval crypt, the Angevine sepulchre of Marinella Rufolo, and an episcopal mitre and a Crucifix from the 13th century. Also notable is the Bishops' Palace.
- Minuta: Romanesque church of Annunziata
- Pontone: church of San Giovanni Battista and the remains of the basilica of Sant'Eustachio.

== Chestnuts ==
The town is known for its cultivation of chestnuts. Every year, at the end of November, for two consecutive weekends, a Sagra delle Castagne (a chestnut festival) is held in the main square.

== See also ==
- Amalfi Coast
- Sorrentine Peninsula
