= Raito (village) =

- Frazione
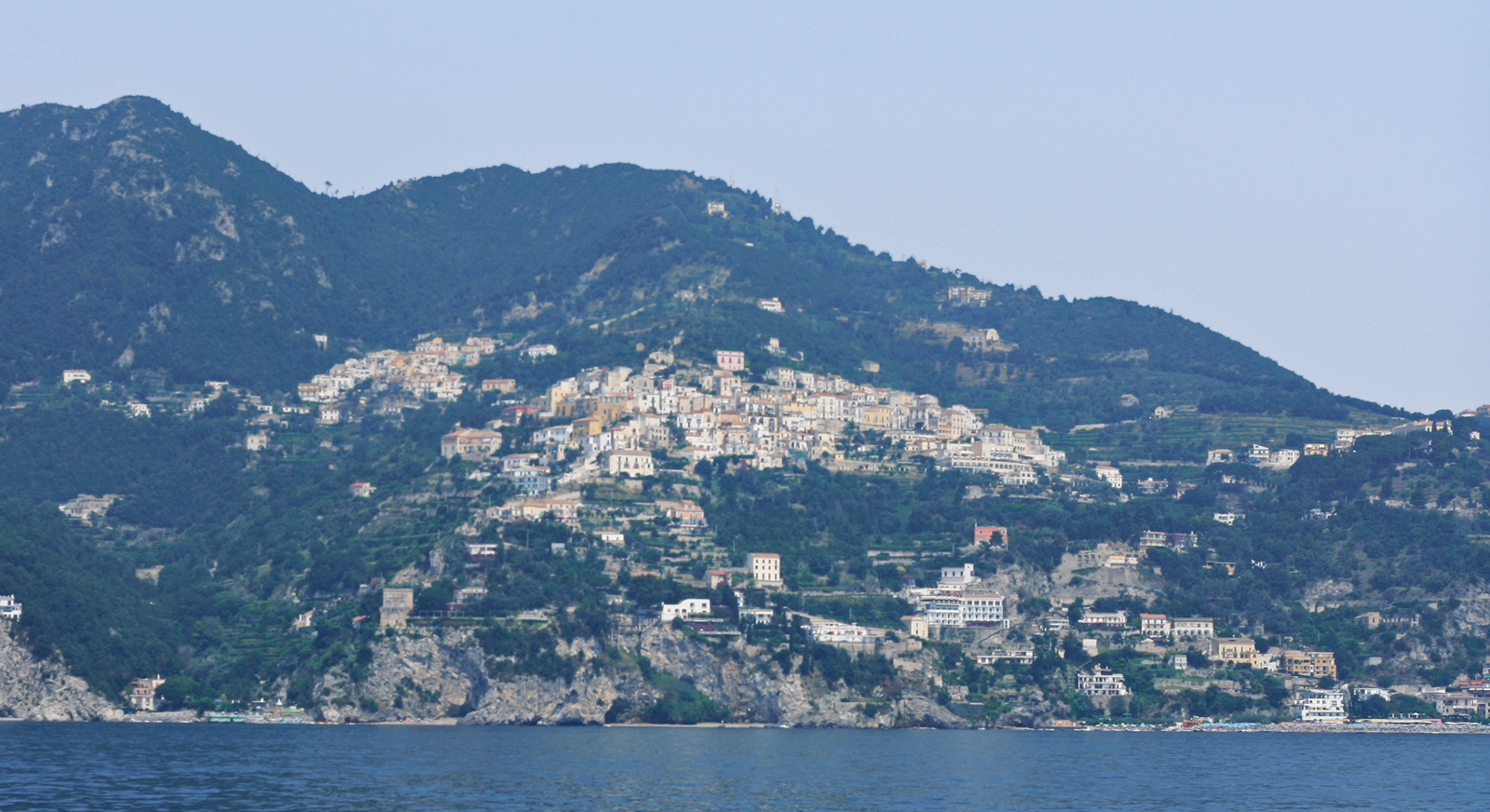
- Raito seen from the sea. In the left corner, upon the hill, the village of Albori

- Location of Raito in Italy
- Coordinates: 40°40′4.92″N 14°42′58.2″E
- Country: Italy
- Region: Campania
- Province: Salerno (SA)
- Comune: Vietri sul Mare
- Elevation: 294 m (965 ft)

Population (2001)
  - Total: 996
- Demonym: Raitesi
- Time zone: UTC+1 (CET)
  - Summer (DST): UTC+2 (CEST)
- Postal code: 84019
- Dialing code: (+39) 089
- Patron saint: Our Lady of Graces
- Website: Official website

Raito is an Italian hamlet (frazione) of the municipality of Vietri sul Mare in the Province of Salerno, Campania. It is part of the Amalfi Coast and its population is 996.

== Geography ==
Raito is located on a hillside under the Lattari Mountains and upon the Tyrrhenian Coast and the Amalfi Drive. It is located on a road linking Albori (1,1 km in the east) to Vietri sul Mare (2 km in the east), and is 6 km far from Cetara, 7 from Cava de' Tirreni, 7,5 from Salerno and 21 from Amalfi. Its inhabited area counts some scattered houses upon the coast and is close to the beach of Marina d'Albori.

== Gallery ==
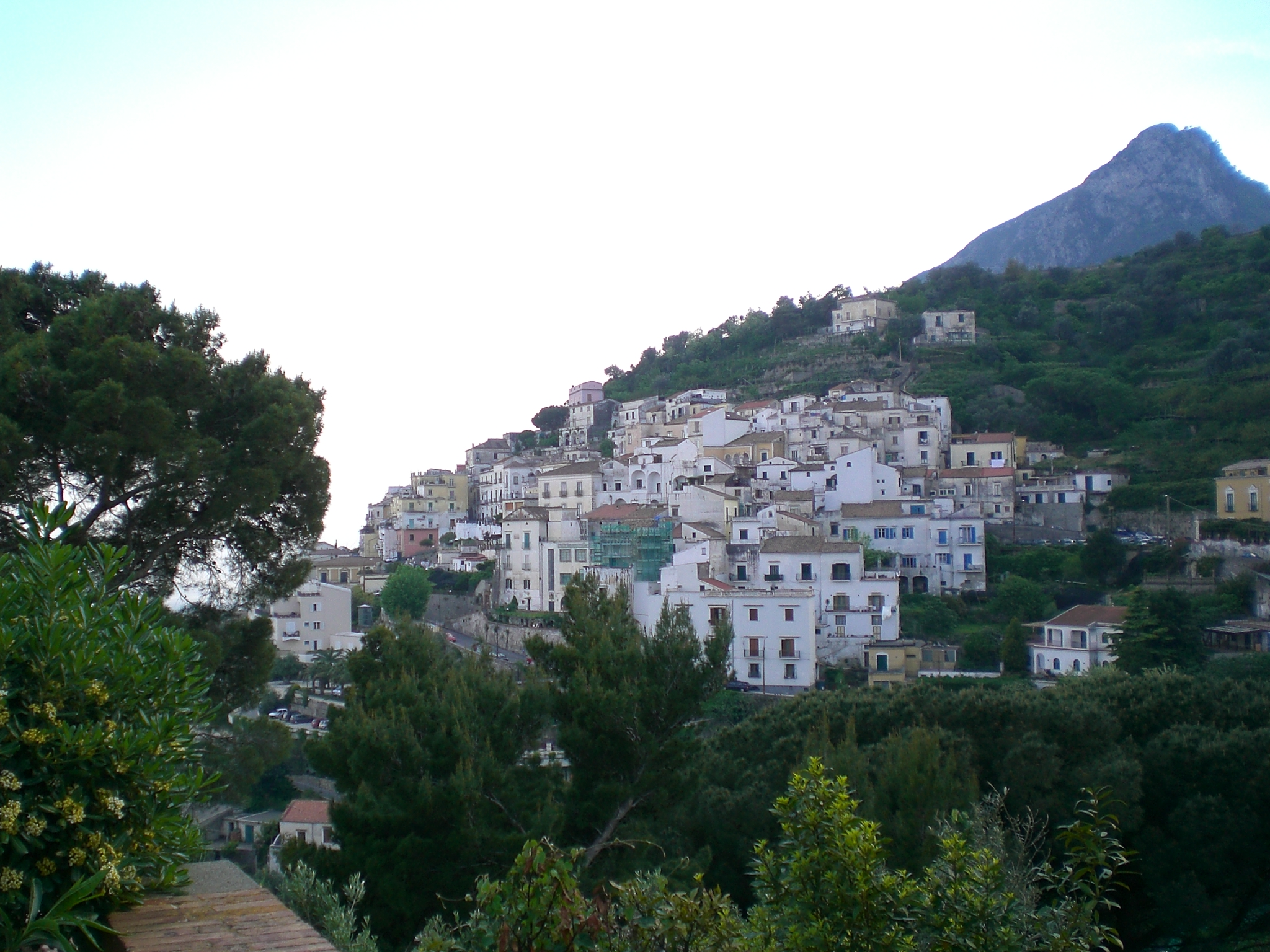
View of Raito

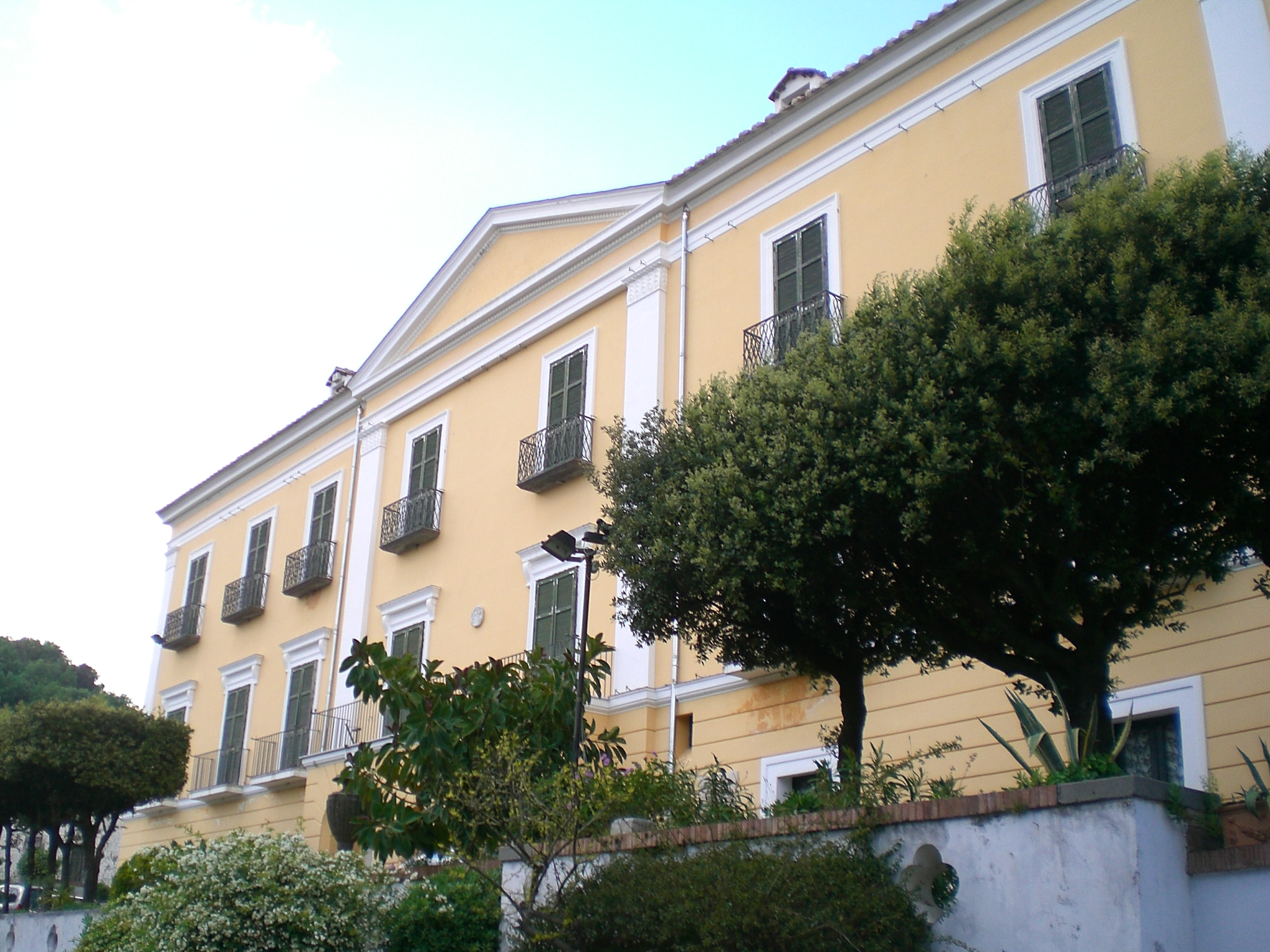
Villa Guariglia

== Personalities ==
- Antonio Savastano (1948–1991): tenor, died in Raito in which he lived from 1980s

== See also ==
- Sorrentine Peninsula
