= Cape (geography) =

Large headland extending into a body of water, usually the sea

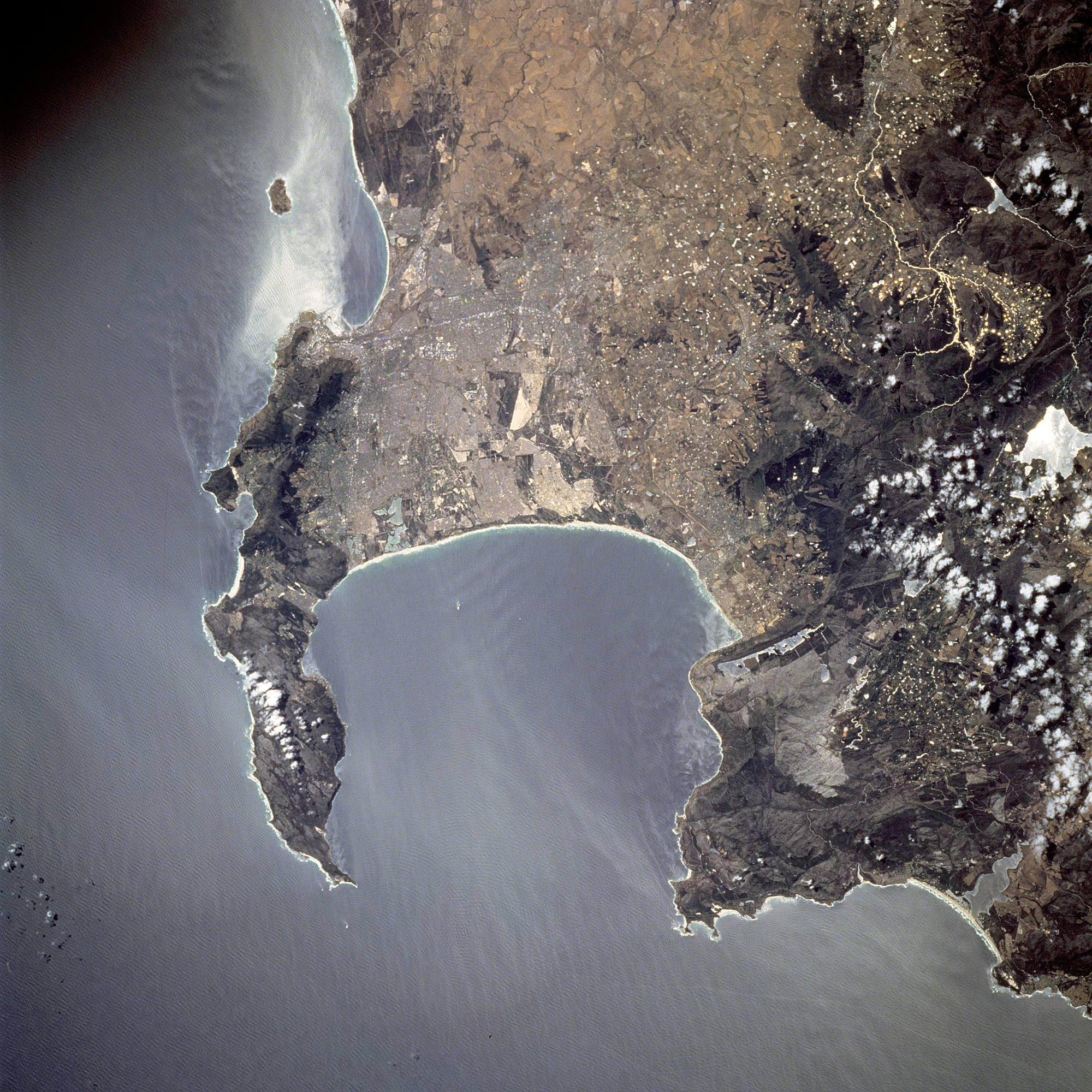
Cape of Good Hope (left) and Cape Hangklip (right) in South Africa, from space

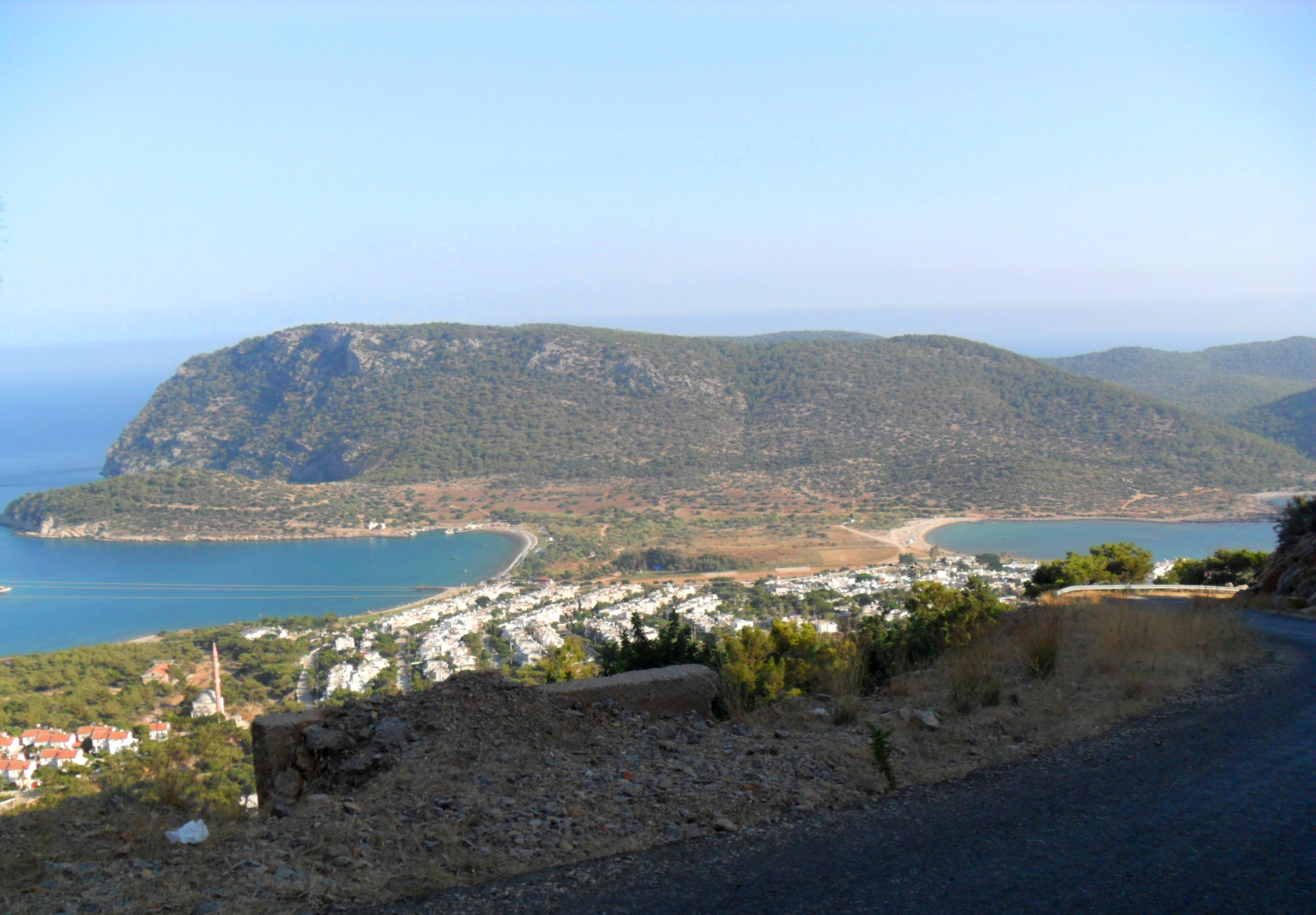
Cape Tisan in Mersin Province, Turkey

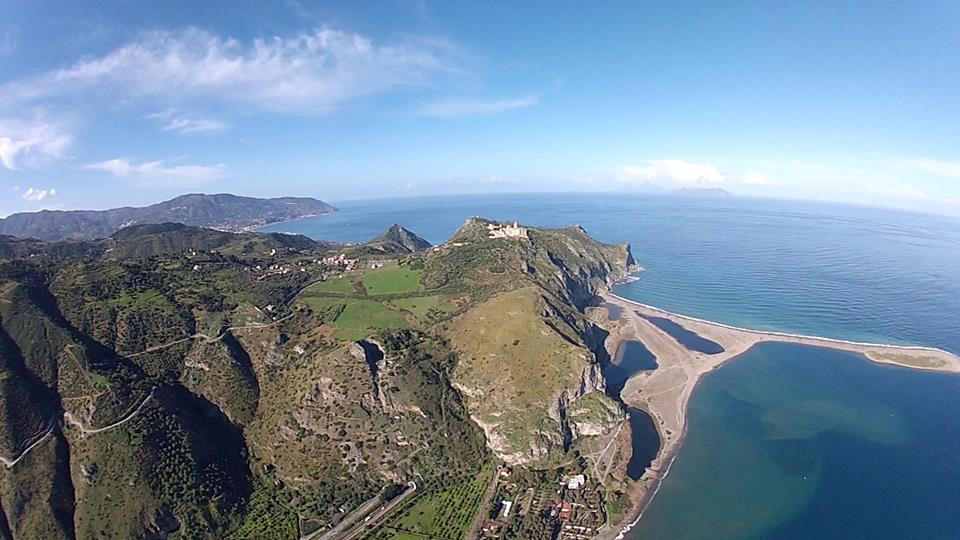
Cape Tindari and Marinello lagoons, Sicily

In geography, a cape is a headland, peninsula or promontory extending into a body of water, usually a sea. A cape usually represents a marked change in trend of the coastline, often making them important landmarks in sea navigation. This also makes them prone to natural forms of erosion, mainly tidal actions, resulting in a relatively short geological lifespan.

== Formation ==
Capes can be formed by glaciers, volcanoes, and changes in sea level. Erosion plays a large role in each of these methods of formation. Coastal erosion by waves and currents can create capes by wearing away softer rock and leaving behind harder rock formations. Movements of the Earth's crust can uplift land, forming capes. For example, the Cape of Good Hope was formed by tectonic forces. Volcanic eruptions can create capes by depositing lava that solidifies into new landforms. Cape Verde, (also known as Cabo Verde) is an example of a volcanic cape. Glaciers can carve out capes by eroding the landscape as they advance and retreat. Cape Cod in the United States was formed by glacial activity during the last Ice Age.

== Importance in navigation ==
Capes (and other headlands) are conspicuous visual landmarks along a coast, and sailors have relied on them for navigation since antiquity. The Greeks and Romans considered some to be sacred capes and erected temples to the sea god nearby.

Greek peripli describe capes and other headlands a sailor will encounter along a route. The Periplus of Pseudo-Scylax, for instance, illustrates a clockwise journey around Sicily using three capes that define its triangular shape: Cape Peloro in the northeast, Cape Pachynus in the southeast, and Cape Lilybaeum in the west. Sicily itself was referred to as Trinacria (or Three Capes) in antiquity.

Homer's works reference a number of capes to describe journeys around the Mediterranean Sea. Menelaus, Agamemnon, and Odysseus each faced peril at the notoriously dangerous Cape Malea at the southeastern tip of the Peloponnese. Menelaus navigated via Cape Sounion on his way home from Troy, and Nestor stopped at Cape Geraestus (now Cape Mandelo) on Euboea to give offerings at the altar to Poseidon there.

Cape Gelidonya (then known as Chelidonia) on the coast of Turkey served as a bearing aid for ships heading to the Egyptian port of Canopus, directly to the south. Cape Sidero on the eastern tip of Crete was a waypoint for Jason and the Argonauts returning from Libya as well as for Paul the Apostle as he traveled from Caesarea to Rome.

The three great capes (Africa's Cape of Good Hope, Australia's Cape Leeuwin, and South America's Cape Horn) defined the traditional clipper route between Europe and the Far East, Australia and New Zealand. They continue to be important landmarks in ocean yacht racing.

== List of capes ==
=== Antarctica ===
- Cape Ann
- Cape May (Antarctica), McMurdo Sound

=== Australia ===
- Cape Flattery (Queensland)
- Cape Howe
- Cape Leeuwin
- Cape York (Queensland)
- Cape Byron

=== Canada ===
- Anse du Cap des Rosiers
- Cape Blomidon
- Cape Kildare
- Cape North
- Cape Race
- Cape Sable
- Cape Spear
- Cape St Mary's
- Cape St. Marys
- Cape Traverse
- Crown Point
- North Cape
- Cape Breton

=== Chile ===
- Cape Horn

=== France ===
- Cap Blanc Nez
- Cap Gris Nez
- Cap d'Antifer, Seine-Maritime
  - Cap d'Antifer Lighthouse
- fr:Cap de la Hève
- fr:Cap Lévy
- Cap de la Hague
- fr:Cap de Carteret
- Cap Fréhel
- Cap de la Chèvre
- Cap Ferret
- Cap Cerbère
- fr:Cap Leucate
- Cap Couronne
  - fr:Phare de Cap Couronne, Lighthouse of Cape Couronne
- fr:Cap Croisette
- Cap Sicié
- fr:Cap Bénat
- fr:Cap Cartaya
- Cap Carmat
- Cap de St-Tropez
- fr:Cap d'Antibes
- fr: Cap Ferrat
- Cap-d'Ail
- Roquebrune-Cap-Martin

=== India ===
- Cape Comorin

=== Indonesia ===
- Tanjung Selatan
- Tanjung Benoa

=== Italy ===
- it:Capo Mele
- Capo di Noli, Noli
- Capo di Vado, Bergeggi
- Capo d'Anzio
  - Capo d'Anzio Lighthouse
- Capo Circeo
- Capo Miseno
- Capo Sottile
- Capo d'Orso
  - Capo d'Orso Lighthouse
- Capo Palinuro
- Capo Scalea
- Cittadella del Capo
- Capo Vaticano
- Capo Suvero
- Capo Peloro
- Capo di Milazzo
- it:Capo Calavà
- Capo d'Orlando
- Capo Plaia
- Capo Zafferano
- Capo Gallo
- it:Capo San Vito
- it:Capo Feto
- Capo Granitola
- Capo San Marco
- it:Capo Bianco
- it:Capo Santa Panagia
- Capo Santa Croce
- Capo Canpolato
- Capo Schisò
- Capo dell'Armi
- it:Capo Spartivento
- Capo Bruzzano
- Capo Rizzuto
- Capo Colonna, home to the remaining column of the Temple of Hera Lacinia
- Capo Trionto
- it:Capo Spulico
- Capo San Vito
- Torre del Pizzo
- Capo Santa Maria di Leuca
- Capo San Gennaro
- Capo di Torre Cavallo
- Punta Cavalluccio
- it:Punta Ferruccio

=== Malaysia ===
- Tanjung Datu
- Tanjung Piai
- Tanjung Tuan

=== Portugal ===
- Cabo da Roca

=== United States ===
- Cape Alava, Washington
- Cape Ann, Massachusetts
- Cape Blanco, Oregon
- Cape Canaveral, Florida
  - Cape Canaveral Space Force Station, a launch station of the US Space Force
- Cape Charles, Virginia
- Cape Cod, Massachusetts
- Cape Coral, Florida
- Cape Disappointment, Washington
- Cape Elizabeth, Washington
- Cape Fear, North Carolina
- Cape Flattery, Washington
- Cape Foulweather, Oregon
- Cape Hatteras, North Carolina
- Cape Henry, Virginia
- Cape Johnson, Washington
- Cape Kiwanda, Oregon
- Cape Lookout, North Carolina
- Cape Lookout, Oregon
- Cape May, New Jersey
- Cape Meares, Oregon
- Cape Mendocino, California
- Cape Perpetua, Oregon
- Cape Rosier, Maine
- Cape San Martin, California
- Seawood Cape, California

=== Spain ===
- Cabo Higer, Akartegi
- Cabo Ogoño, Bizkaia
- Cabo Matxitxako, Bermeo
- Cabo de Billao, Bizkaia
- es:Cabo de Ajo, Cantabria
- es:Cape Mayor, Santander, Cantabria
- Cabo de Oyambre, Cantabria
- Cabo Prieto, Llanes Asturias
- Cabo Lastres, Colunga Asturias
- es:Cabo Torres, Gijón
- Cabo de Peñas, Peñes
- es:Cabo Vidio, Cudillero
- Cabo Busto, Asturias
- Cabo Cebes, Tapia de Casariego
- Cabo Burela, Burela
- Cabo de Morás, Lugo
- Cabo Ortegal, La Coruña
- es:Cabo Prior, Ferrol
- Cabo Prioriño Grande, Ferrol
- Cabo Santo Adrián, La Coruña
- Cabo de Laxe, La Coruña
- Cabo do Trece, La Coruña
- Cape Vilan, La Coruña
- Cabo Touriñán, Muxía
- Cabo da Nave, La Coruña
- Cape Finisterre, La Coruña, Galicia
- Cabo Corrubedo, Ribeira
- Cabo Urda, Bueu
- es:Cabo Home, Cangas
- es:Cabo Silleiro, Pontevedra

=== South Africa ===
- Cape of Good Hope, a headland on the southwest coast of South Africa, when referred to as the Cape, a metonym for:
  - Dutch Cape Colony, a colony of the Dutch East India company
  - Cape Colony, a British colony in South Africa that replaced the Dutch Cape Colony
  - Cape Province, a former province of South Africa formed from the Cape Colony
  - Cape Town, a city in South Africa, and surrounding areas

== Gallery ==
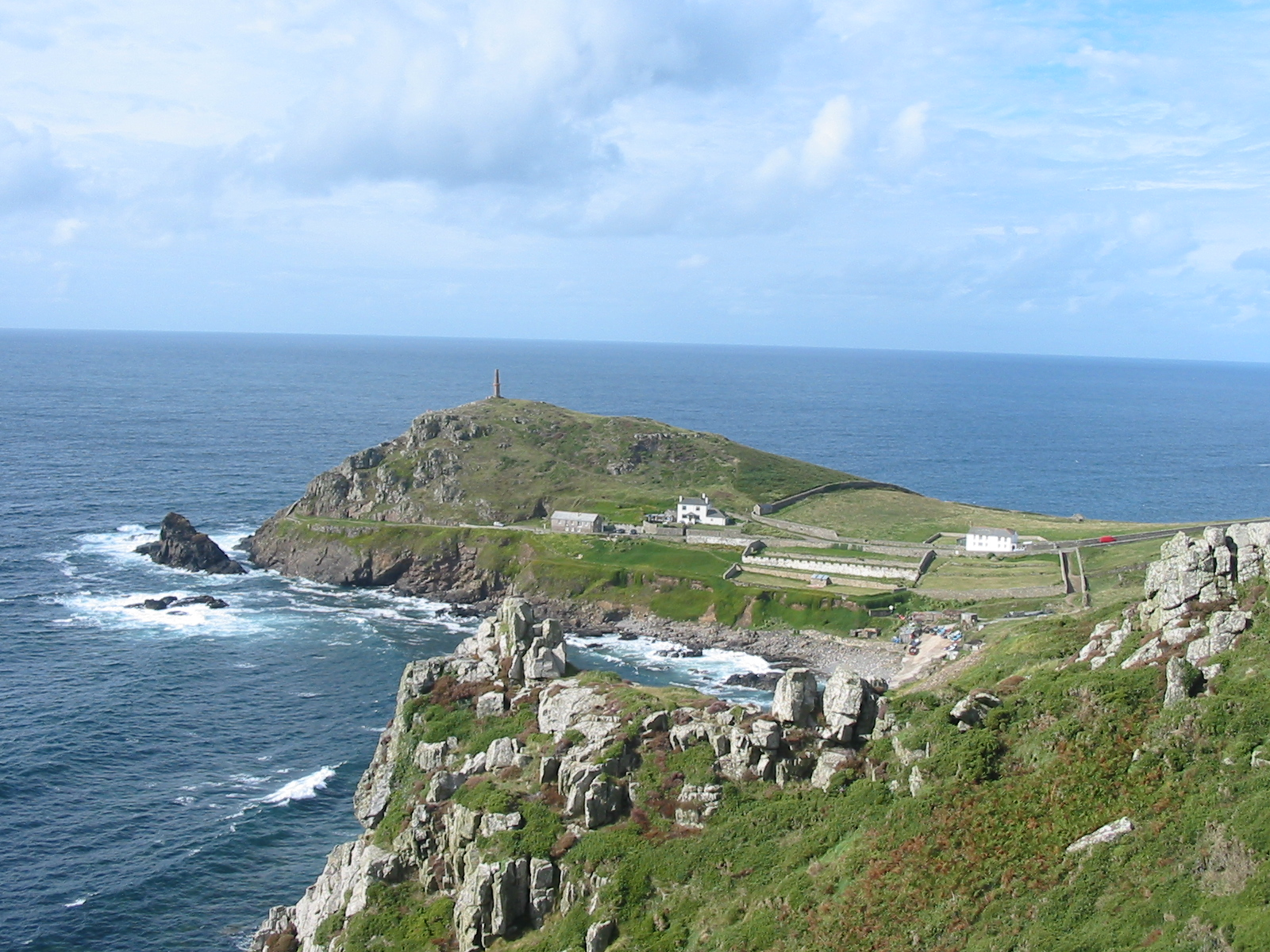
Cape Cornwall, England

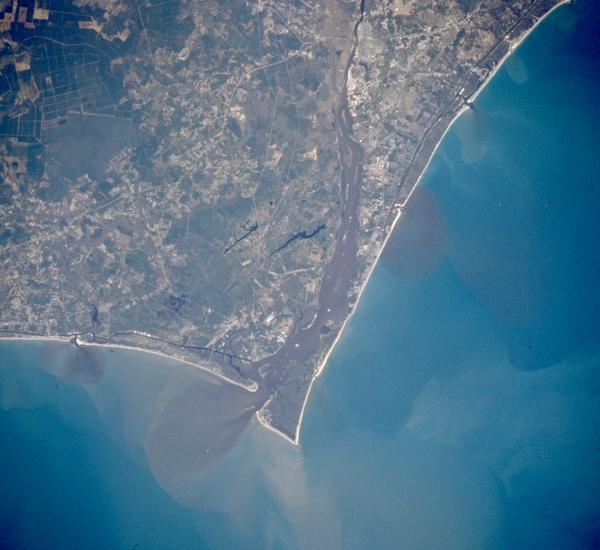
Satellite image of Cape Fear, North Carolina

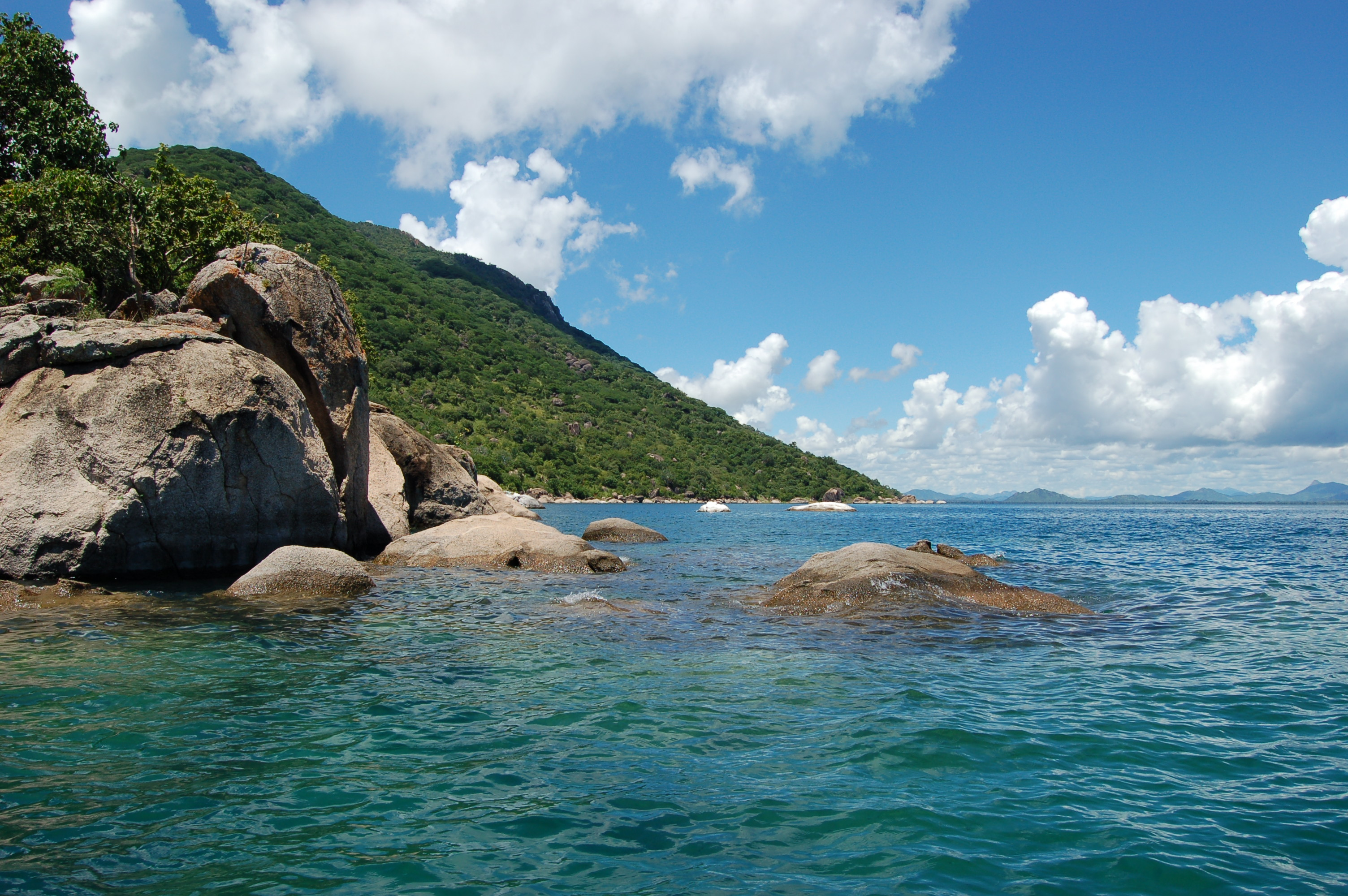
Cape MacLear, Malawi

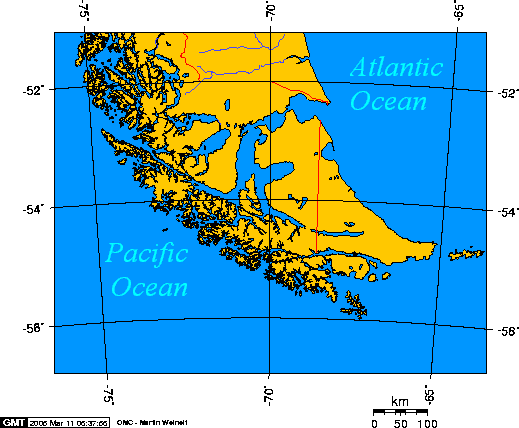
Map depicting Cape Horn at the southernmost portion of South America

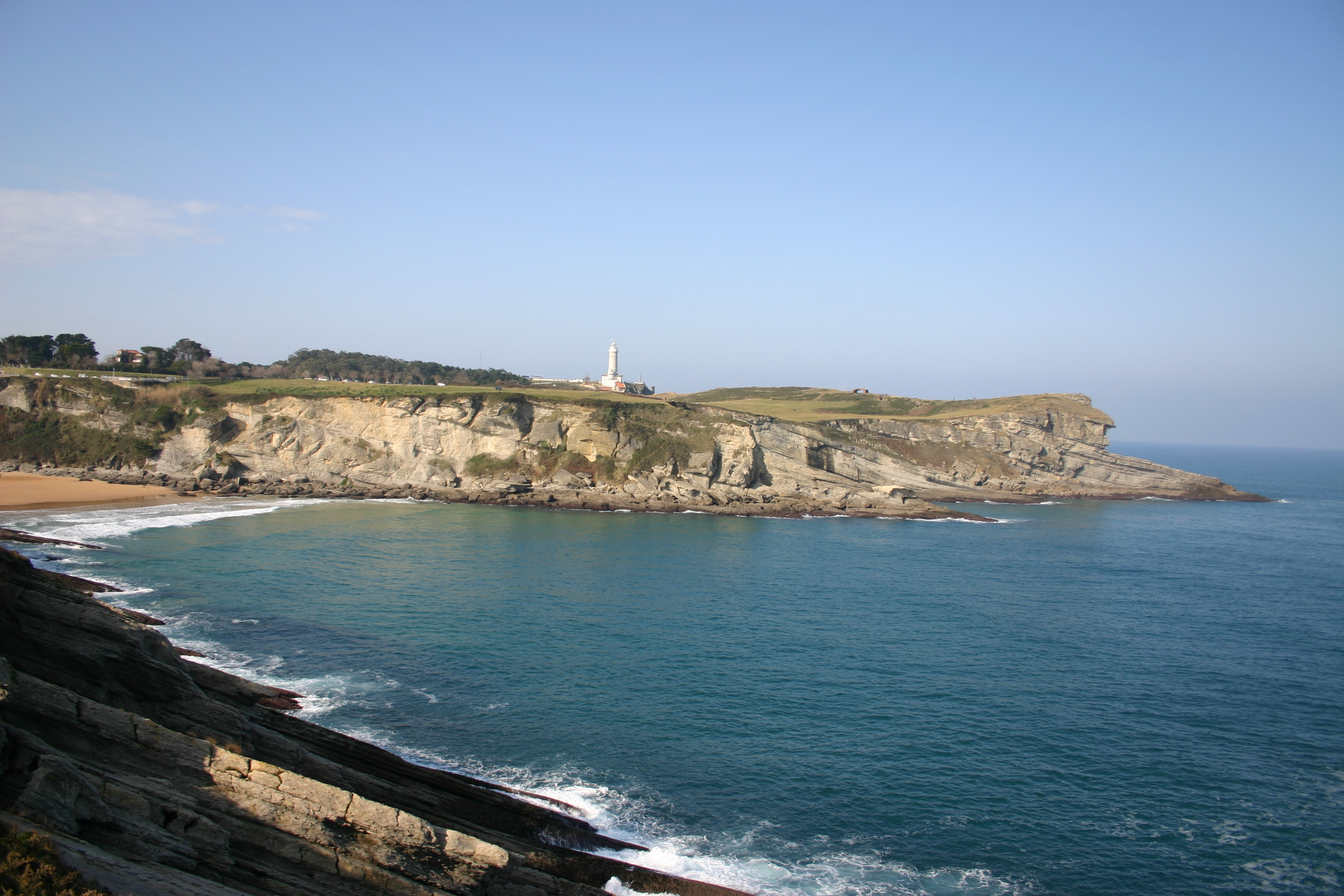
Photograph of Cabo Mayor in Santander, Spain

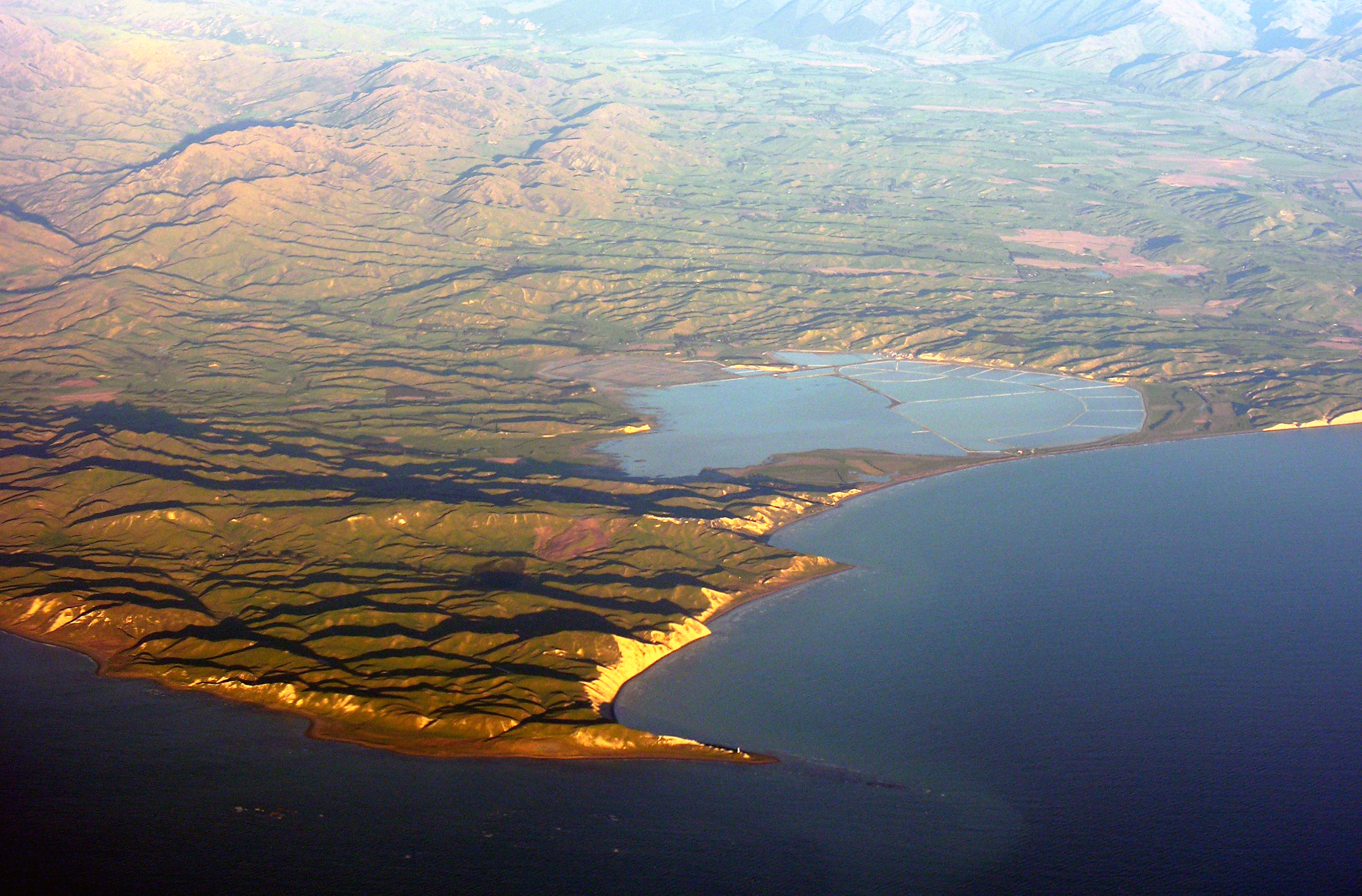
Photograph of Cape Campbell, New Zealand, at sunrise

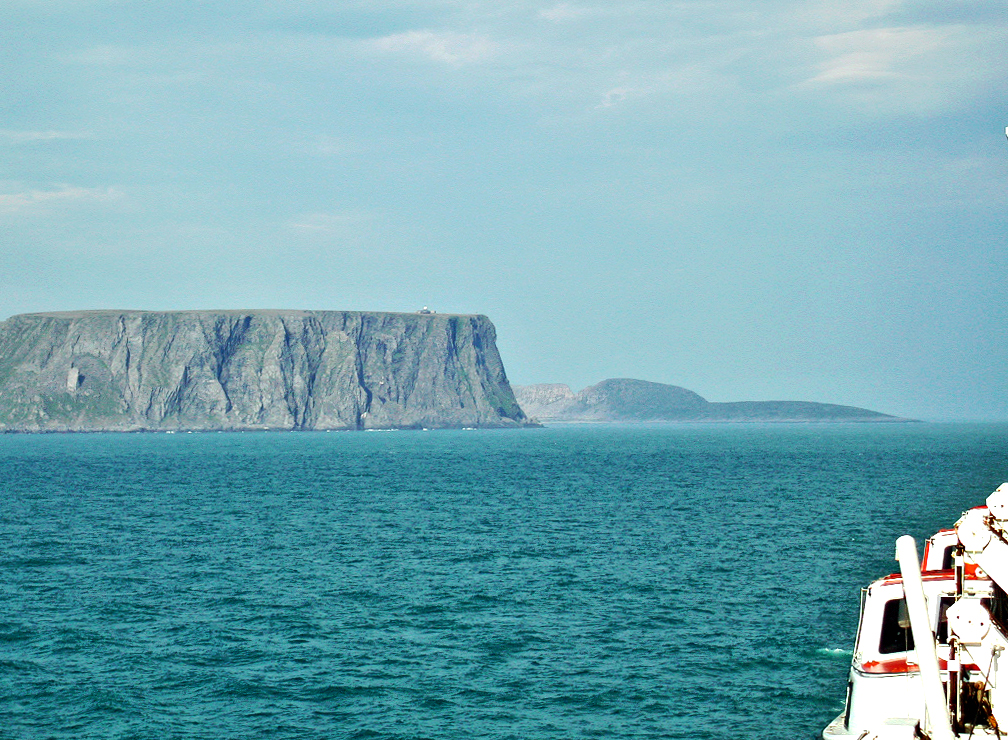
The North Cape, Finnmark, Norway

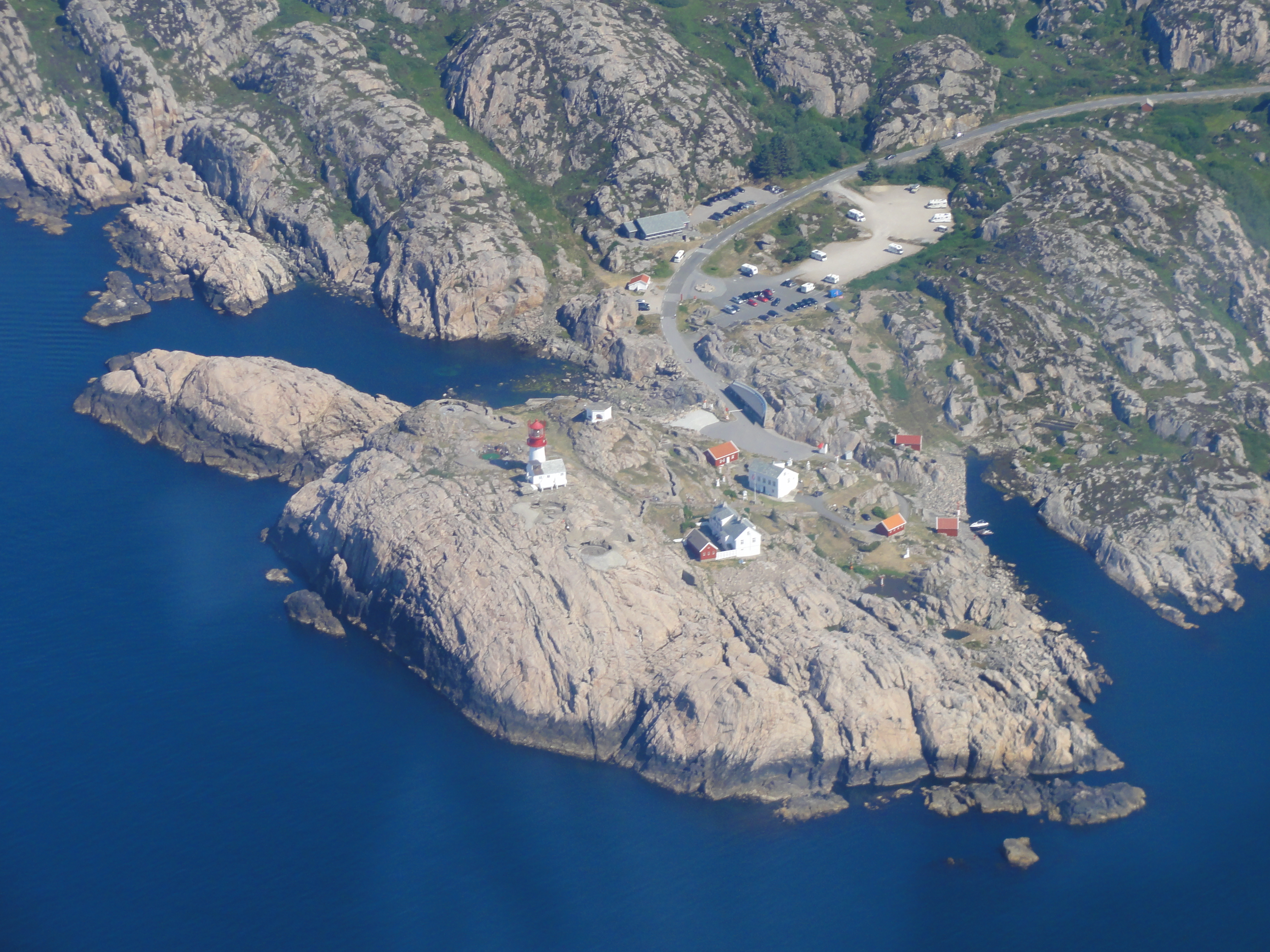
Aerial view of Cape Lindesnes, Mandal, Norway

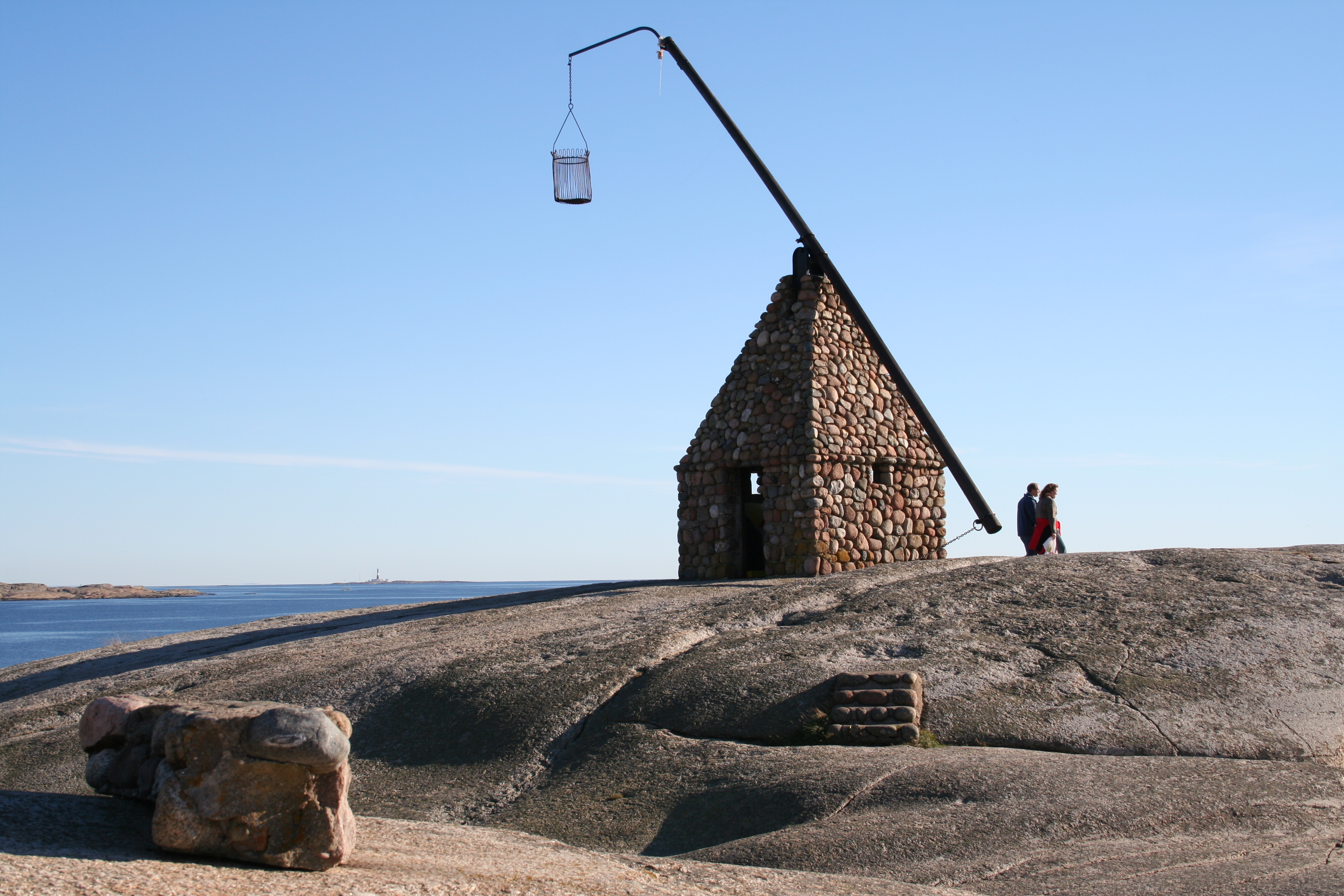
Tipping lantern at Cape Verdens Ende, Tønsberg, Norway

== See also ==
- Extreme points of Africa
- Extreme points of Antarctica
- Extreme points of Asia
- Extreme points of Australia
- Extreme points of Europe
- Extreme points of North America
- Extreme points of South America
