= Apicella =

Apicella is a surname. Notable people with the surname include:

- Enzo Apicella (1922–2018), Italian-born British artist, cartoonist, designer and restaurateur
- Marco Apicella (born 1965), Italian racing driver
- Lucia Apicella (1887–1982), Italian philanthropist
- Manuel Apicella (born 1970), French chess grandmaster
- Lorenzo Apicella, Italian architect
