= Massimo D'Amico =

Italian painter

Massimo D'Amico (born 1979) is an Italian artist working in the Czech Republic.

== Biography ==
D'Amico was born in Vietri sul Mare, on Amalfi Coast, and lives and works in Prague. After a self-taught apprenticeship that lasted throughout his teens, he took courses in painting at the Naples Academy of Fine Arts. At around twenty-three years, he decides to leave the southern Italy, to have a broader contact with the international art scene, and follows different routes, including Barcelona, London, and then went to New York City, where he joined in 2006 in the large group of emerging artists, actors and musicians, that find themselves living in the new Brooklyn, as Williamsburg and Green Point, but looking for areas of visibility, collaboration and records in Manhattan. He now exhibits for the gallery Monkdogz Urban Art in Chelsea on 27th Street.

== Style ==
His style is a combination of semi-abstract and Expressionist art, and is hard to categorize. His images are mostly structures and machines, "capable of collecting energy and matter".
