= Capo d'Orso Lighthouse =

Capo d'Orso Lighthouse may refer to:

- Capo d'Orso Lighthouse, Campania
- Capo d'Orso Lighthouse, Sardinia
