= Bisogno =

Bisogno is a surname of Italian origin. In English, the meaning of "bisogno" is need. Notable people with the surname include:

- Daniel Bisogno (1973–2025), Mexican television presenter, actor and comedian
- Luca Bisogno (born 2000), Italian professional footballer

== See also ==
- Non abbiamo bisogno, Roman Catholic encyclical published 1931 by Pope Pius XI
