= Murder of Simonetta Lamberti =

1982 child murder in Italy

The murder of Simonetta Lamberti took place in Cava de' Tirreni, Italy, on 29 May 1982. The victim, the 11-year-old daughter of magistrate Alfonso Lamberti (1937–2015), was killed during an attack targeting her father, at the time prosecutor of Sala Consilina.

The crime is remembered as the first in a series involving innocent victims in organized crime struggles in the 1980s.

== Murder ==
Simonetta Lamberti, born in Naples on 21 November 1970, was the daughter of magistrate Alfonso Lamberti, prosecutor of Salerno and later of Sala Consilina, engaged in the fight against kidnappings and, therefore, in the fight against the Camorra. Due to his investigative activities against organized crime he was under police protection.

On 29 May 1982 Lamberti and his daughter traveled from Cava de 'Tirreni, where he lived, to the adjacent Vietri sul Mare, to spend a few hours on the beach. On the way back, a few hundred meters from the entrance to Cava de' Tirreni, the magistrate's car was flanked by another vehicle from which numerous gunshots were fired that inflicted non-life-threatening wounds on the magistrate. His daughter, asleep in the back seat, was shot in the head and killed almost instantly.

== Investigation ==
The investigation into Simonetta Lamberti's murder focused almost immediately on her father's activity as a magistrate, placing the murder in the framework of Camorra activities.

As a result of the investigation, in 1987 the Court of Assizes of Salerno sentenced Francesco Apicella to life imprisonment based on eyewitness testimony. On 18 April 1988, the day of sentencing, based on the non-credibility of the pentiti who had testified, the Court of Appeal of Salerno, presided over by Mario Consolazio, acquitted Salvatore Di Maio and Carmine Di Girolamo of the murder.

On 18 May 1993, the victim's father, Judge Alfonso Lamberti, was arrested on the basis of statements made by the pentito Pasquale Galasso, in which Lamberti was defined as "organic to the Camorra". According to Galasso's statements, Lamberti favored Carmine Alfieri and Galasso himself, issuing sentences that annulled "personal and patrimonial prevention measures" against them. In July of the same year, Alfonso Lamberti attempted suicide in prison. Later the accusations against the judge turned out to be unfounded and Lamberti was released.

In 2006, the writer Roberto Saviano identified Raffaele Cutolo as the instigator of the murder of Simonetta Lamberti in his book, Gomorrah. The NCO boss denied the charges from Novara prison, suing Saviano over his allegations. The Court of Trento rejected Raffaele Cutolo's charges against Saviano.

The investigation into Simonetta Lamberti's murder was reopened in the first week of November 2011, based on revelations by Antonio Pignataro, a confessed offender. Pignarato allegedly participated in the planning of the attack on Judge Lamberti, which was carried out by four other people, on behalf of Salvatore Di Maio. According to Pignataro, the car used for the ambush, a white Fiat 127, was sold to the attackers by Giovanni Gaudio, who was now under investigation.

On 5 November 2019, Pignataro was released from prison and subjected to an injunction to stay; he had received a sentence of 30 years in prison.

== Legacy ==
The acute impression created by Simonetta Lamberti's murder was immediately symbolized by a monument erected in her honor in Cava de 'Tirreni, very shortly after the crime. The monument, a broken marble stone, made thanks to a spontaneous subscription of the citizenry, was later removed for some public works and could only be restored after about ten years. To this day it is visible in the city park that runs along Via Marcello Garzia.

On 2 April 1983, the Stadio di Cava de' Tirreni and the library of the "Museum of the Sea" of Naples, Bagnoli were named after Simonetta Lamberti. A square in the municipality of Cautano, a town in the province of Benevento, is also dedicated to her.

On 29 May 1984, the President of Italy, Sandro Pertini, visiting Cava de' Tirreni, unveiled a plaque in memory of the child in the school library.

On 21 November 2018, the "Largo Simonetta Lamberti" was dedicated in the city of Naples by the Mayor of Naples, Luigi de Magistris, near Piazza Giovanni Bovio. At the center of "Largo Simonetta Lamberti", an olive tree was also planted as a symbol of peace and in conjunction with the National Day of the Tree.

Simonetta Lamberti is remembered every year on 21 March on the "Day of Remembrance and Commitment" of Libera, the network of associations against the Mafia, which on this date reads the list of names of victims of the Mafia and Mafia phenomena.
