= Giampaolo Parisi =

Italian footballer

Personal information
- Date of birth: 17 July 1979 (age 47)
- Place of birth: Cava de' Tirreni, Italy
- Height: 1.84 m (6 ft 1/2 in)
- Position: Central defender

Youth career
- Salernitana

Senior career*
Years	Team	Apps	(Gls)
1999–2000	Salernitana	6	(0)
2000–2003	Avellino	9	(0)
2000–2001	→ Salernitana (loan)	2	(0)
2001–2002	→ Castel di Sangro (loan)	23	(0)
2003	→ Viterbese (loan)	14	(0)
2004–2005	Sora	26	(1)
2005–2006	Foggia	18	(0)
2006–2007	Salernitana	10	(0)
2007–2008	Sansovino	23	(0)
2008–2009	Potenza	9	(0)
2009–2010	Manfredonia	28	(0)
2010–2011	Casertana		
2011–2012	Sarnese	21	(0)
2012–2013	Agropoli		
2013–2014	Cavese		
2014	Scafatese	12	(0)
2015–2016	Picciola		

International career
2000	Italy U21	2	(0)
- * Club domestic league appearances and goals

Giampaolo Parisi (born 17 July 1979) is an Italian former footballer.
