= Vietri sul Mare =

- Comune
- Comune di Vietri sul Mare
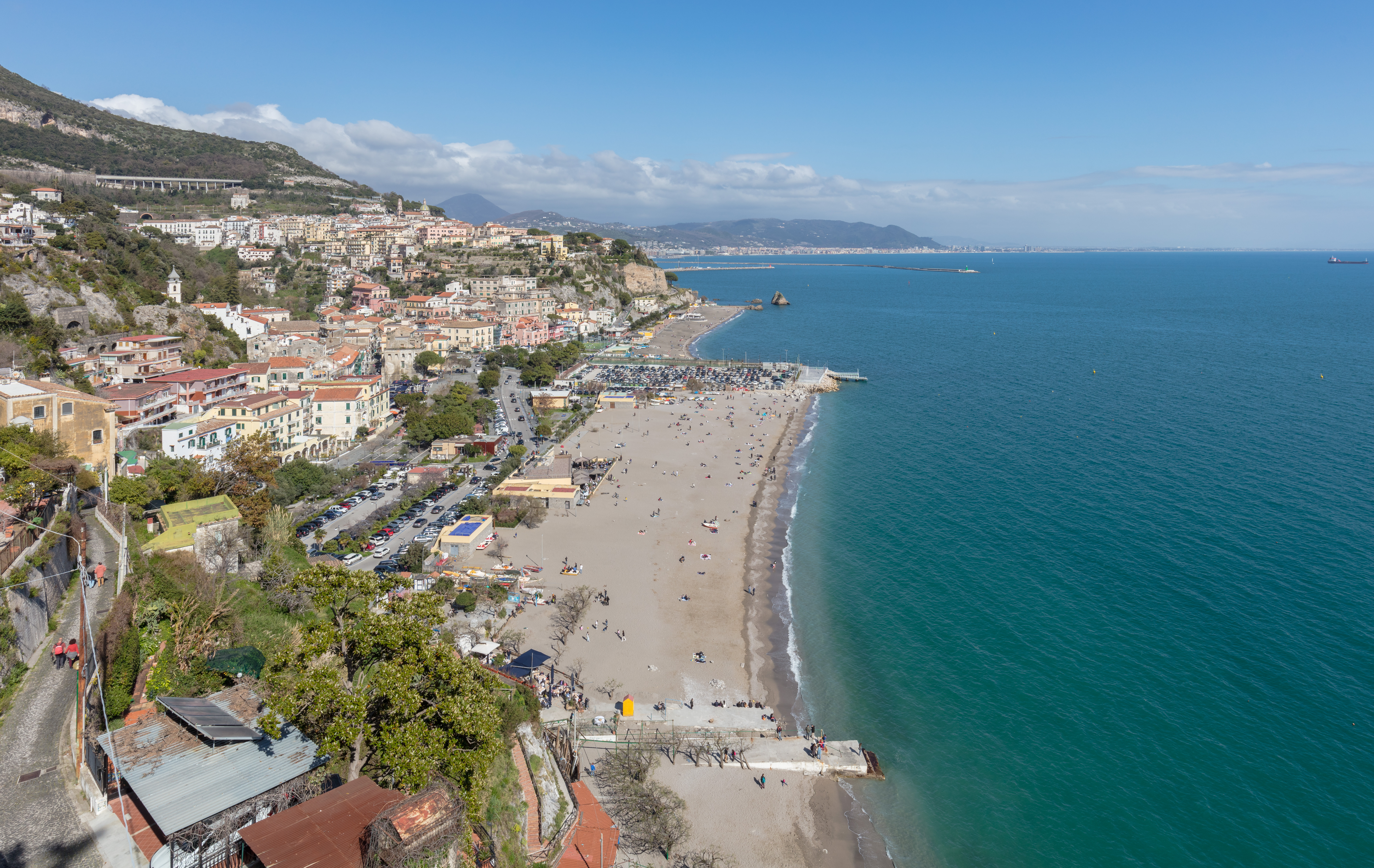
- View of Vietri sul Mare

- Coat of arms

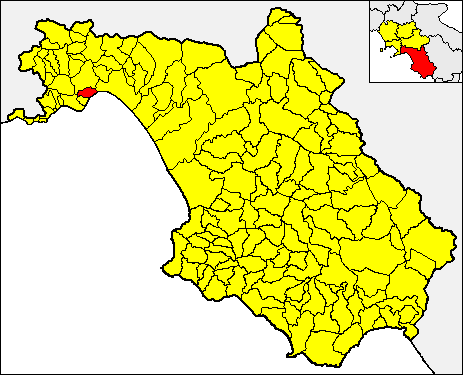
- Vietri sul Mare within the province of Salerno

- Location within Italy Location within Campania
- Coordinates: 40°40′N 14°44′E
- Country: Italy
- Region: Campania
- Province: Salerno (SA)
- Frazioni: Albori, Benincasa, Dragonea, Iaconti, Molina, Raito, San Vincenzo

Government
  - Mayor: Giovanni de Simone

Area
  - Total: 9.52 km^{2} (3.68 sq mi)
- Elevation: 80 m (260 ft)

Population (28 February 2017)
  - Total: 7,793
  - Density: 819/km^{2} (2,120/sq mi)
- Demonym: Vietresi (Dialect: Vietraiuli)
- Time zone: UTC+1 (CET)
  - Summer (DST): UTC+2 (CEST)
- Postal code: 84019
- Dialing code: 089
- Patron saint: St. John the Baptist
- Saint day: 24 June
- Website: Official website

UNESCO World Heritage Site
- Part of: Costiera Amalfitana
- Criteria: Cultural: (ii)(iv)
- Reference: 830
- Inscription: 1997 (21st Session)
- Area: 11,206 ha (27,690 acres)
- Buffer zone: 11,857 ha (29,300 acres)

Vietri sul Mare is a comune (municipality) in the province of Salerno, in the Italian region of Campania. It is situated just west of Salerno, separated from the Port of Salerno by only a harbour wall. The town is known for its polychrome ceramics, a tradition since at least the 15th century, and is considered to be the gateway to the Amalfi Coast.

Its frazione of Albori is one of I Borghi più belli d'Italia ("The most beautiful villages of Italy"). The main landmark of Vietri sul Mare is the Church of St. John the Baptist, a late Neapolitan Renaissance style building with a high bell tower. There are numerous buildings displaying ceramics, including the Museo Provinciale della Ceramica in the nearby village of Raito.

== Geography ==
The town is bordered by Cava de' Tirreni, Cetara, Maiori and Salerno. The quarter by the sea, named Marina di Vietri is located to the south of the town. The other hamlets (Italian: frazioni) are Albori, Benincasa, Dragonea (including the localities of Iaconti and San Vincenzo) and Molina.

== Main sights ==
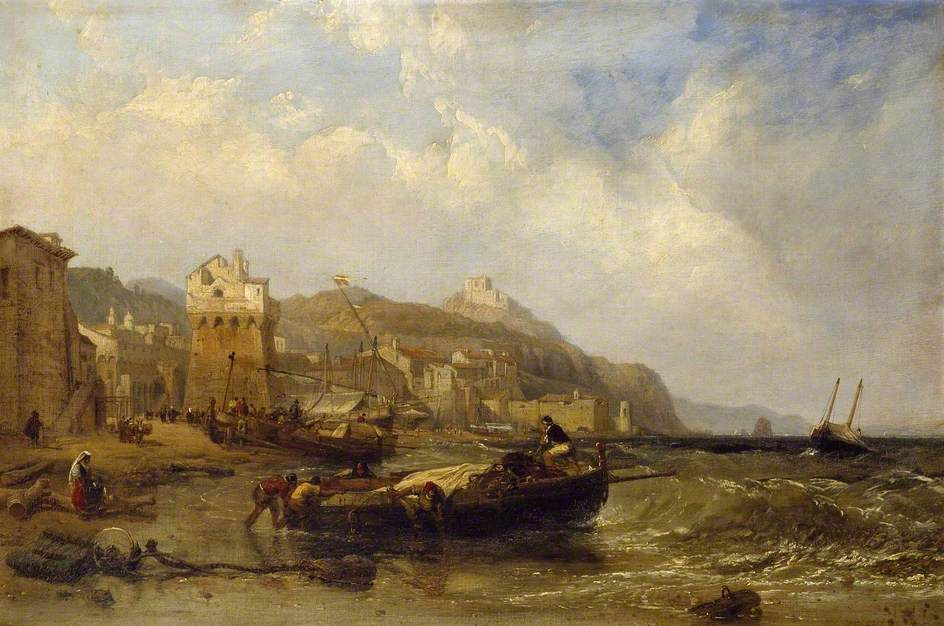
A View of Vietri in the Gulf of Salerno by Clarkson Stanfield, 1840

The principal church in Vietri sul Mare is the Church of St. John the Baptist, a late Neapolitan Renaissance style building with a high bell tower. A previous church dated from the 10th century. It contains a coffered gold ceiling, a 17th-century marble altar, an alabaster statue of the Saint, and an 11th-century wooden crucifix. The Confraternity of the Annunciation and the Rosary dates to the 17th century and is noted for its facade decorated with pottery. Other notable churches include the 16th century Church of the Madonna delle Grazie in Raito, the Church of Santa Margherita in Albori and the Church of Santa Maria delle Grazie in Benincasa.

The Palazzo Solimene was built after World War II by Paolo Soleri, and houses ceramic collections. The Palazzo Taiani is noted for its dovecote tower, which was once used to watch out for Saracens during raids. The nearby village of Raito contains the Museo Provinciale della Ceramica.

== People ==
- Antonio Carluccio (1937–2017), chef
- Massimo D'Amico (born 1979), artist
- Antonio Forcellino, historian
- Antonio Savastano, opera singer
- Germano Benencase (Benincasa), composer, musician and conductor
- Giuseppe Prezzolini, writer, honoured citizen
