= A View of Vietri in the Gulf of Salerno =

Painting by Clarkson Stanfield

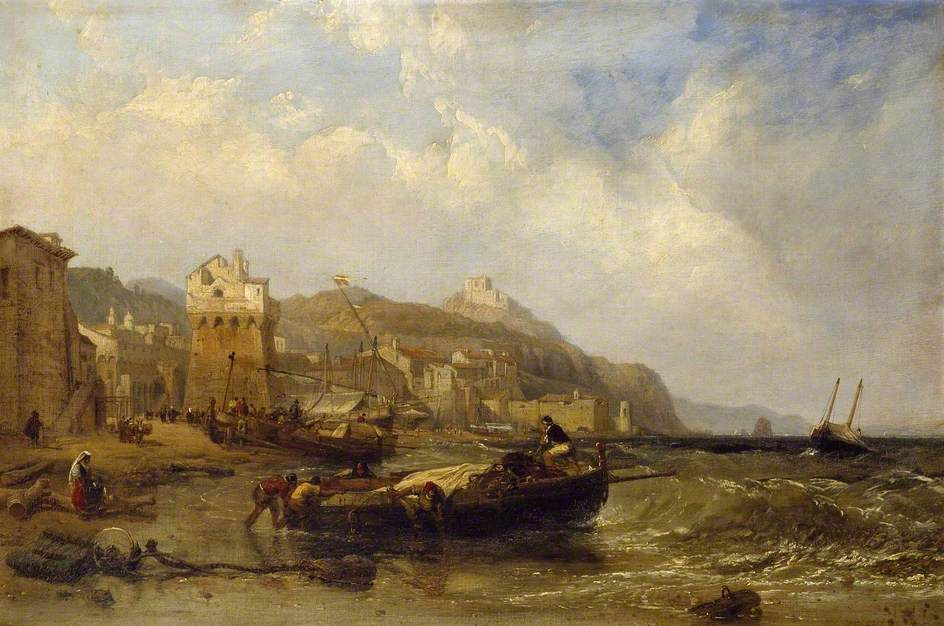
- Version in the Ashmolean Museum
- Artist: Clarkson Stanfield
- Year: 1840
- Type: Oil on canvas, landscape painting
- Dimensions: 563 cm × 81.4 cm (222 in × 32.0 in)
- Location: Royal Collection; London

A View of Vietri in the Gulf of Salerno is an 1840 landscape painting by the British artist Clarkson Stanfield. It depicts the coast of Italy with a view of Vietri sul Mare on the Gulf of Salerno. Stanfield, a former sailor in the Royal Navy, was known for his seascapes and costal scenes.

A friend of J.M.W. Turner and David Roberts, he was a noted painter of the Romantic movement of the early Victorian era. He had visited Italy in 1838 and sketched the area around Amalfi. He displayed several works from his Italian trip at the Royal Academy Exhibition of 1840 at the National Gallery in London. It was purchased the same year by Queen Victoria and remains in the Royal Collection today.

A later, smaller version of the painting, produced by Stanfield in 1855, is now in the Ashmolean Museum in Oxford. This has some notable differences from the original painting.

== Bibliography ==
- Wright, Christopher, Gordon, Catherine May & Smith, Mary Peskett. British and Irish Paintings in Public Collections: An Index of British and Irish Oil Paintings by Artists Born Before 1870 in Public and Institutional Collections in the United Kingdom and Ireland. Yale University Press, 2006.
- Van der Merwe, Pieter & Took, Roger. The Spectacular career of Clarkson Stanfield. Tyne and Wear County Council Museums, 1979.
