= Cava de' Tirreni =

Cava de' Tirreni 'A Cava (Neapolitan)
- Comune
- Città di Cava de' Tirreni
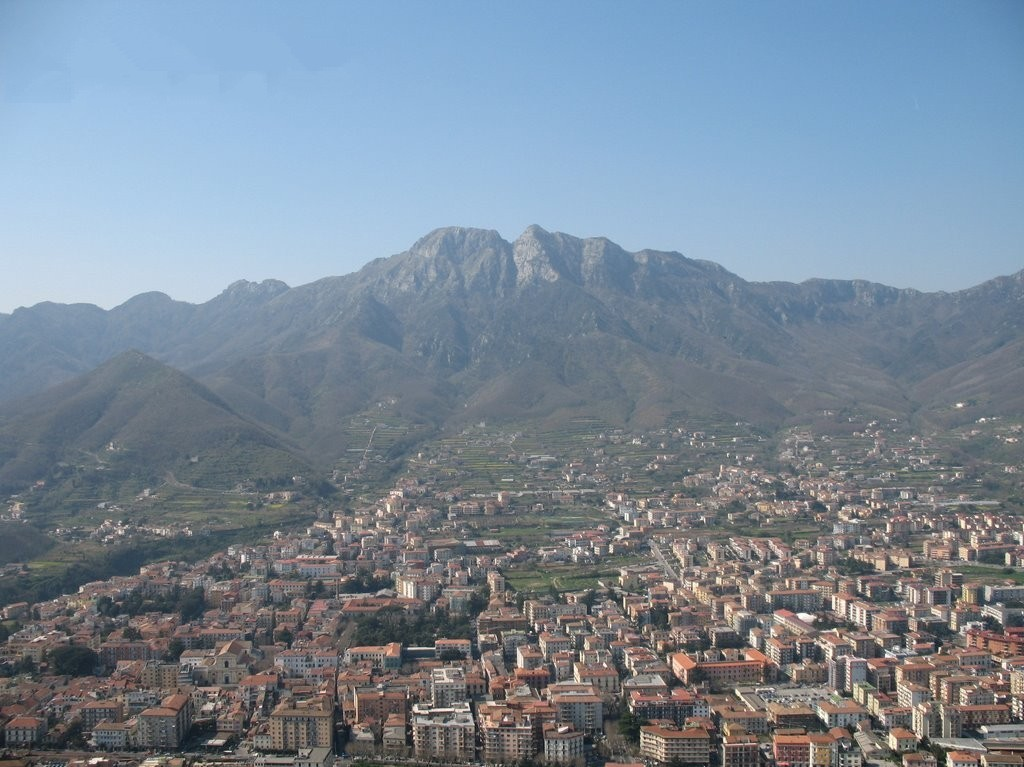

- Flag Coat of arms

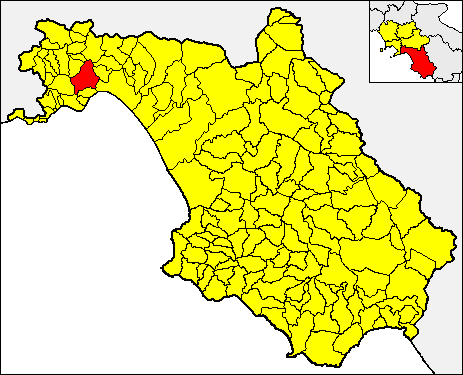
- Cava within the Province of Salerno

- Location within Italy Location within Campania
- Coordinates: 40°42′N 14°42′E
- Country: Italy
- Region: Campania
- Province: Salerno (SA)
- Frazioni: see text

Government
  - Mayor: Vincenzo Servalli

Area
  - Total: 36.46 km^{2} (14.08 sq mi)
- Elevation: 180 m (590 ft)

Population (30 April 2023)
  - Total: 50,346
  - Density: 1,381/km^{2} (3,576/sq mi)
- Demonym: Cavesi
- Time zone: UTC+1 (CET)
  - Summer (DST): UTC+2 (CEST)
- Postal code: 84013
- Dialing code: 089
- ISTAT code: 065037
- Patron saint: Sant'Adiutore & Santa Maria Incoronata dell’Olmo
- Saint day: September 8
- Website: Official website

Cava de' Tirreni (Italian: [ˈkaːva de tirˈrɛːni]; Cilentan: A Càva) is a city and comune in the region of Campania, Italy, in the province of Salerno, 10 kilometres (6 miles) northwest of the town of Salerno. It lies in a richly cultivated valley surrounded by wooded hills, and is a popular tourist resort. The abbey of La Trinità della Cava is located there.

== Geography ==
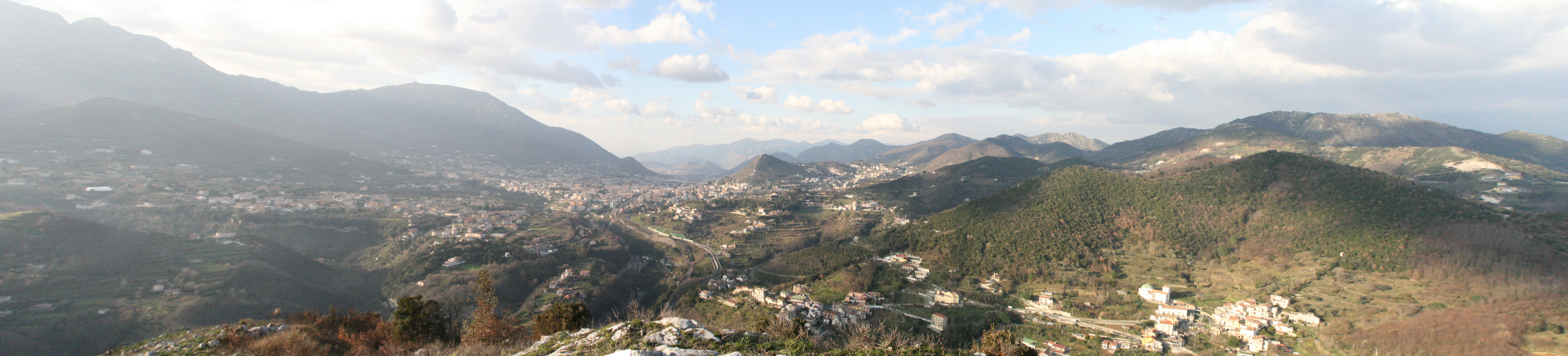
Cava de' Tirreni panorama from Mount Saint Liberatore.

=== Overview ===
Cava de' Tirreni lies among the hills close to the Tyrrhenian Sea, 5 km (3 mi) north of the Amalfi Coast and serving in practice as its northern gateway. The inhabited area is 198 m above sea level, in a valley situated between two mountain groups: the Lattari Mountains (which separate Cava from the Amalfi Coast) to the west and the Picentini Mountains to the east.

Cava is bordered to the north by Nocera Superiore, Roccapiemonte and Mercato San Severino; to the east by Baronissi, Pellezzano and Salerno; to the south by Vietri sul Mare and Maiori; and to the west by Tramonti.

=== Frazioni ===
The Italian: frazioni of Cava are: Alessia, Annunziata, Arcara, Casaburi-Rotolo, Castagneto, Corpo di Cava, Croce, Dupino, Marini, Passiano, Pregiato, San Cesareo, San Pietro, Sant'Anna, Sant'Arcangelo, San Martino, Santa Lucia, Santa Maria del Rovo, and Santi Quaranta.

== History ==
The town, initially comprehending present-day Vietri sul Mare, was founded by the Etruscans with the name of Marcina, as part of a colonial system known as Etruria Campana. The modern name Cava de' Tirreni (lit. 'Cave of the Tyrrhenians') is a tribute to the Etruscan heritage of the area. The church and the greater part of the abbey buildings were entirely modernized in 1796. The old Gothic cloisters are preserved. The church contains a fine organ and several ancient sarcophagi. The archives, now national property, include fine incunabula, documents and manuscripts of great value (including the Codex Legum Longobardorum of 1004 and the La Cava Bible).

== Notable sites ==
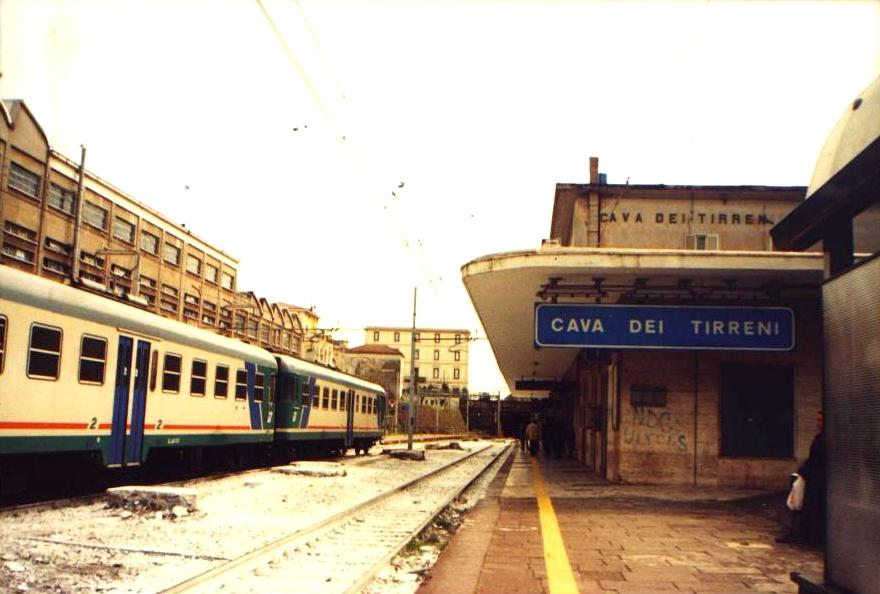
Railway station

- Abbey of La Trinità della Cava, founded in 1011. Features include the ambon with mosaics (12th century), the grotto of St. Alferius, the Romanesque cloister (13th century) and the large library, housing more than 50,000 volumes.

== Notable people ==
- Lucia Apicella (Mamma Lucia, philanthropist)
- Ferrante I d'Aragona (Ferdinand I of Naples, King of Naples from 1458 to 1494)
- Ferdinando Baldi (film director, film producer and screenwriter)
- Alfonso Balzico (sculptor and painter)
- Luca Bisogno (footballer)
- Pope Boniface IX
- Alda Borelli, actress in theatre and silent films
- Giuliana De Sio (actress)
- Teresa De Sio (singer)
- Giulio Genoino (Catholic priest; originator, with Masaniello, of the Neapolitan Revolt of 1647)
- Simonetta Lamberti (10-year-old victim of a Camorra killing)
- Sabato Martelli Castaldi (General of the Italian Air Force, partisan and martyr killed in the slaughter of the Fosse Ardeatine massacre on 24 March 1944; posthumous Gold Medal of Military Valor)
- Giampaolo Parisi (football player)
- Andrea Rispoli (football player)
- Fausto Salsano (football manager)
- Raffaele Schiavi (football player)
- Stefano Sorrentino (football player)

== Twin towns – sister cities ==
Cava de' Tirreni is twinned with:

- Gorzów Wielkopolski, Poland
- Kaunas, Lithuania
- (United States) Pittsfield, USA
- Schwerte, Germany
- Nesvizh, Belarus
- (Georgia (country)) Tbilisi, Georgia

== See also ==
- Roman Catholic Diocese of Cava
- La Trinità della Cava
