= Erchie, Maiori =

Erchie
- Frazione
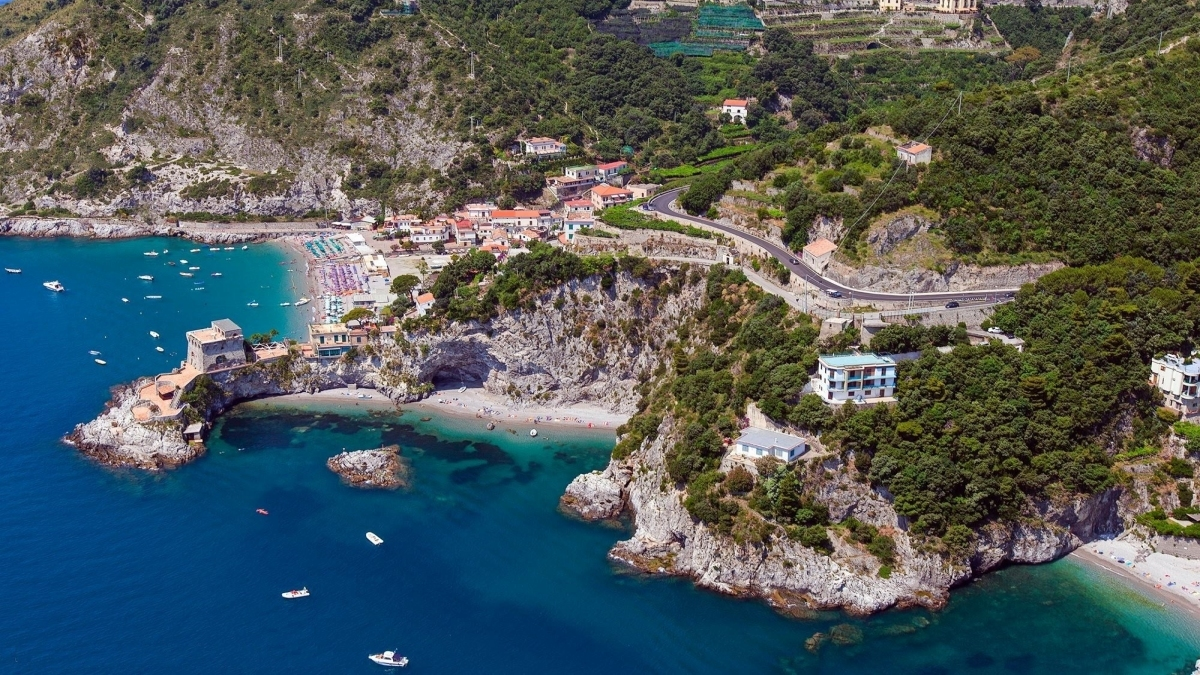

- Location of Erchie in Italy
- Coordinates: 40°38′17.16″N 14°41′38.76″E
- Country: Italy
- Region: Campania
- Province: Salerno (SA)
- Comune: Maiori
- Elevation: 4 m (13 ft)

Population (2009)
  - Total: 83
- Demonym: Erchitani
- Time zone: UTC+1 (CET)
  - Summer (DST): UTC+2 (CEST)
- Postal code: 84010
- Dialing code: (+39) 089

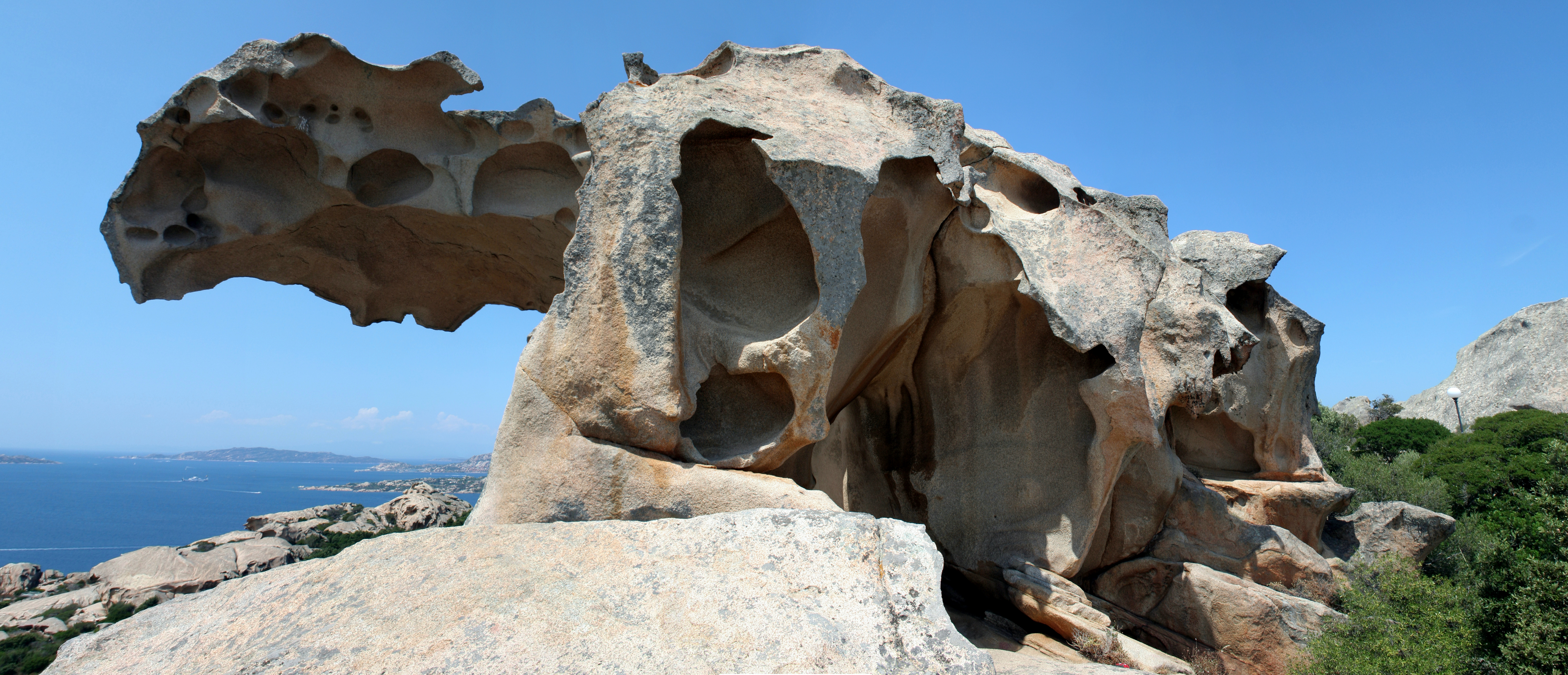
Capo d'Orso (Bear's Cape)

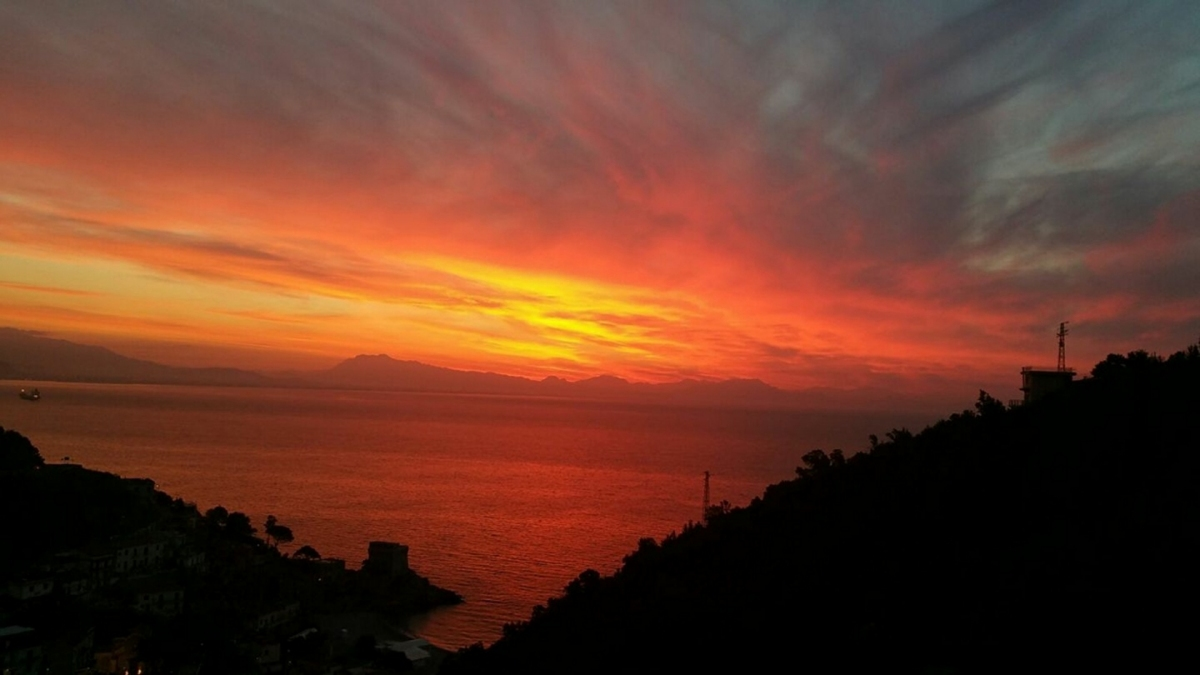
Sunrise over the sea at Erchie

Erchie is an Italian village and hamlet (frazione) of the municipality of Maiori in the Province of Salerno, Campania. It is part of the Amalfi Coast and its population is 83.

== Geography ==
The village is located on the Tyrrhenian coast between Cetara (1,7 km in the east) and Maiori (8,5 km in the west). It is 12 km far from Salerno and 14 from Amalfi. The inhabited area lies around a beach and is surrounded by the Lattari Mountains. Erchie is set, as a hidden gem, in a secluded valley that opens onto the beach and a dreamy bay. The heart of the village is the main beach surrounded by rocky slopes covered with luxuriant vegetation dispersed with little houses. Many exclusive beaches and coves where one may bathe, dive or take the sun, are hidden along the coast and can be reached only by boat.

== Tourism ==
With a few hundred inhabitants, mostly fishermen, Erchie is one of the least populated hamlets in the Amalfi Coast. Nonetheless, its favorable location and relative tranquility have made Erchie a popular destination among tourists.

== Gallery ==
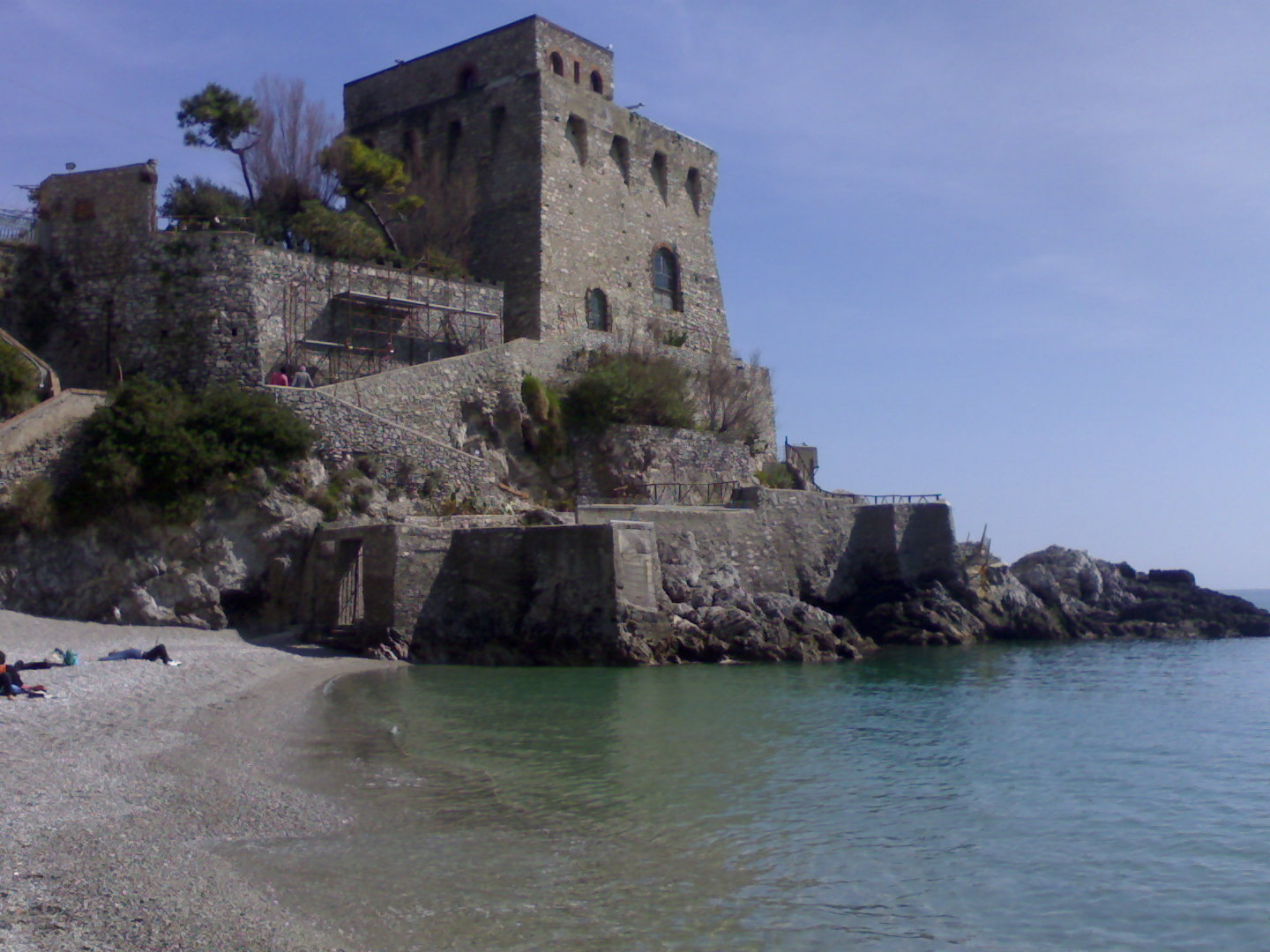
Tower of Erchie

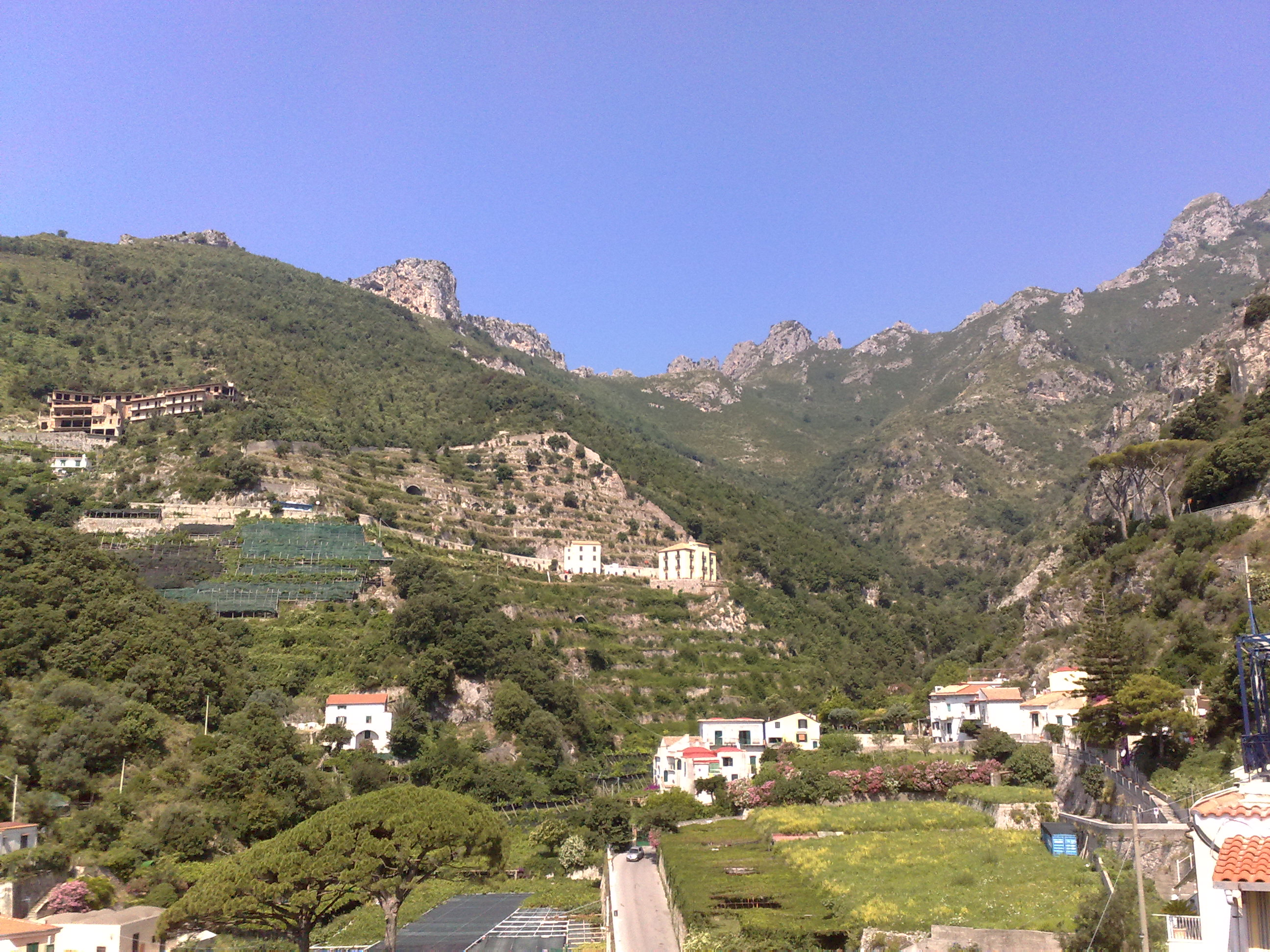
Hillside over Erchie

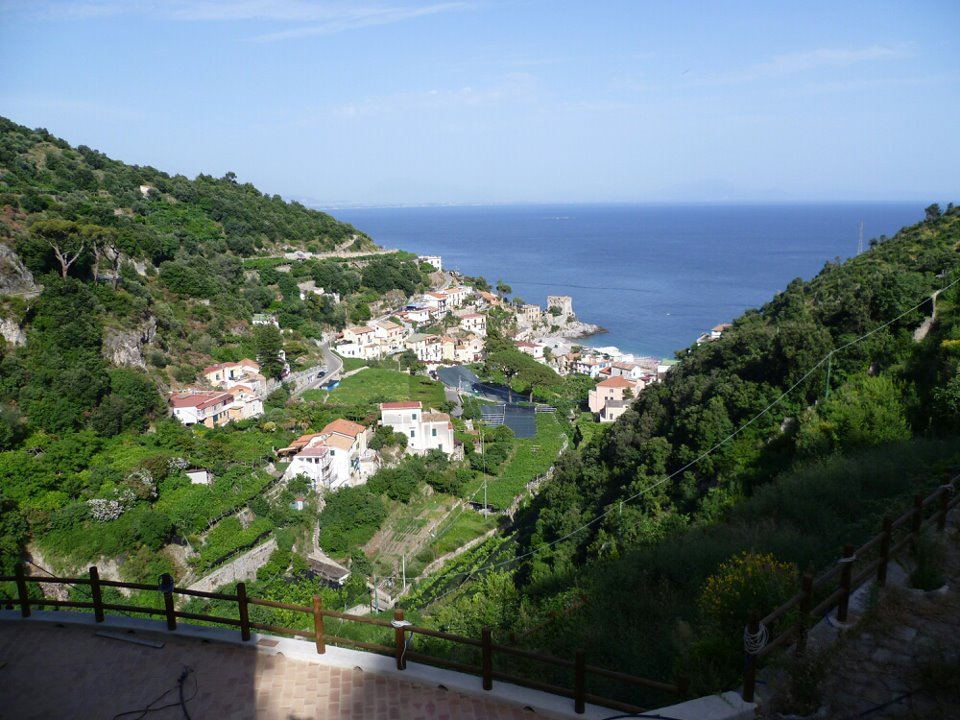
Panoramic view from above

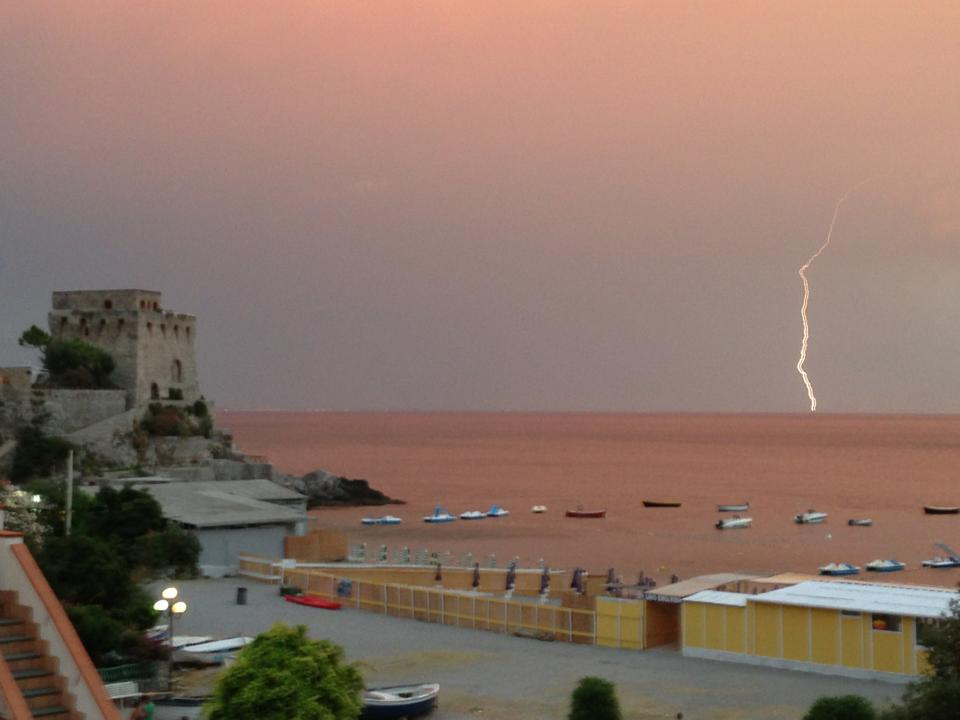
Thunderstorm by the sea

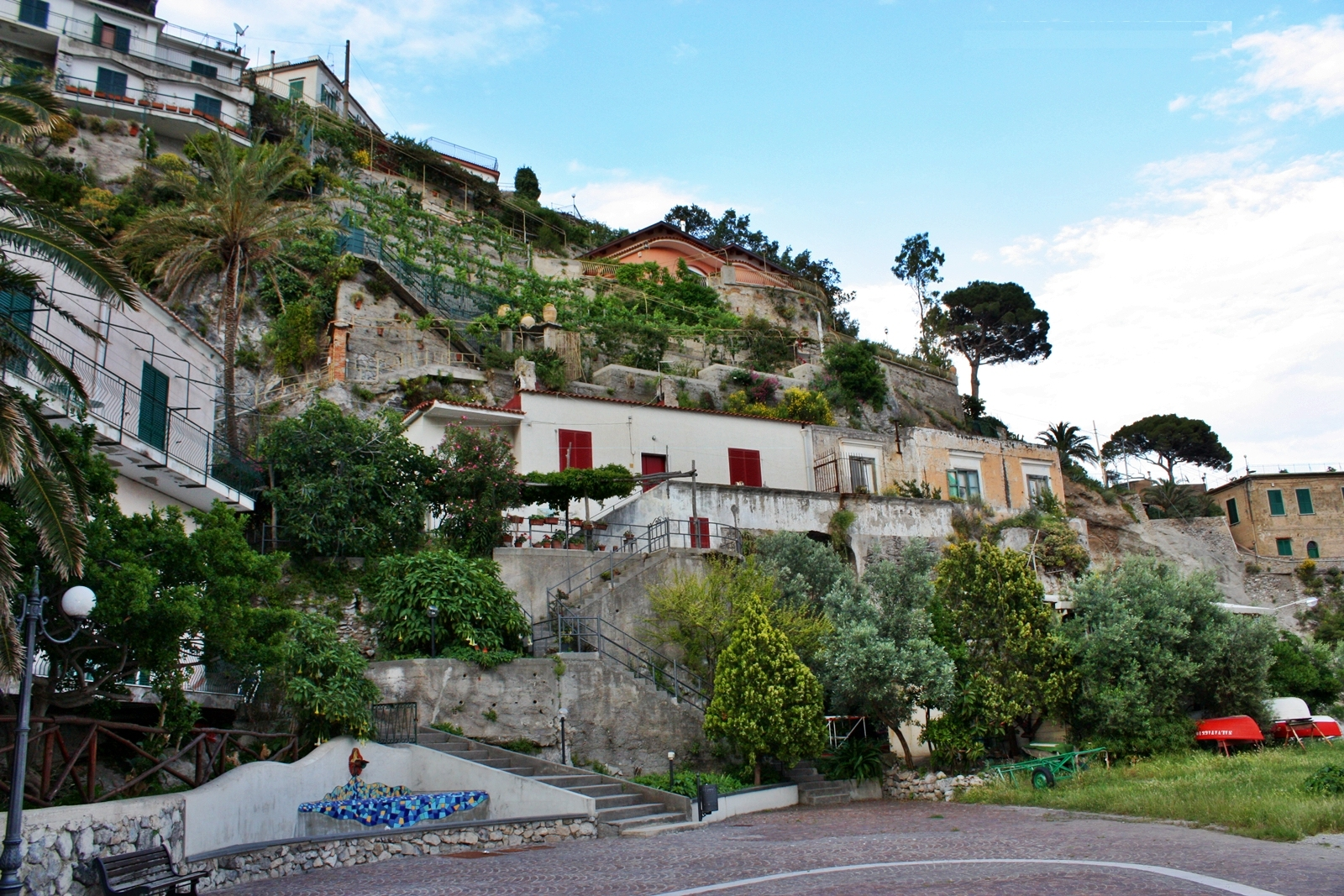
View of a corner of the village

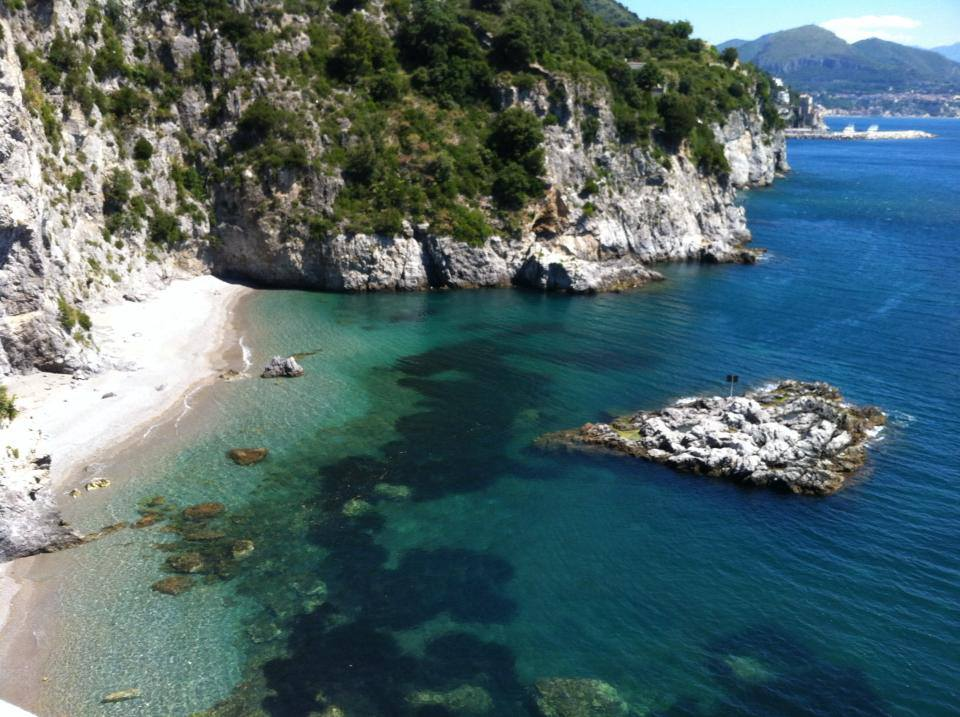
Caugo beach

== See also ==
- Sorrentine Peninsula
