= Capo d'Orso Lighthouse, Campania =

Lighthouse in the Province of Salerno, Italy

Capo d'Orso
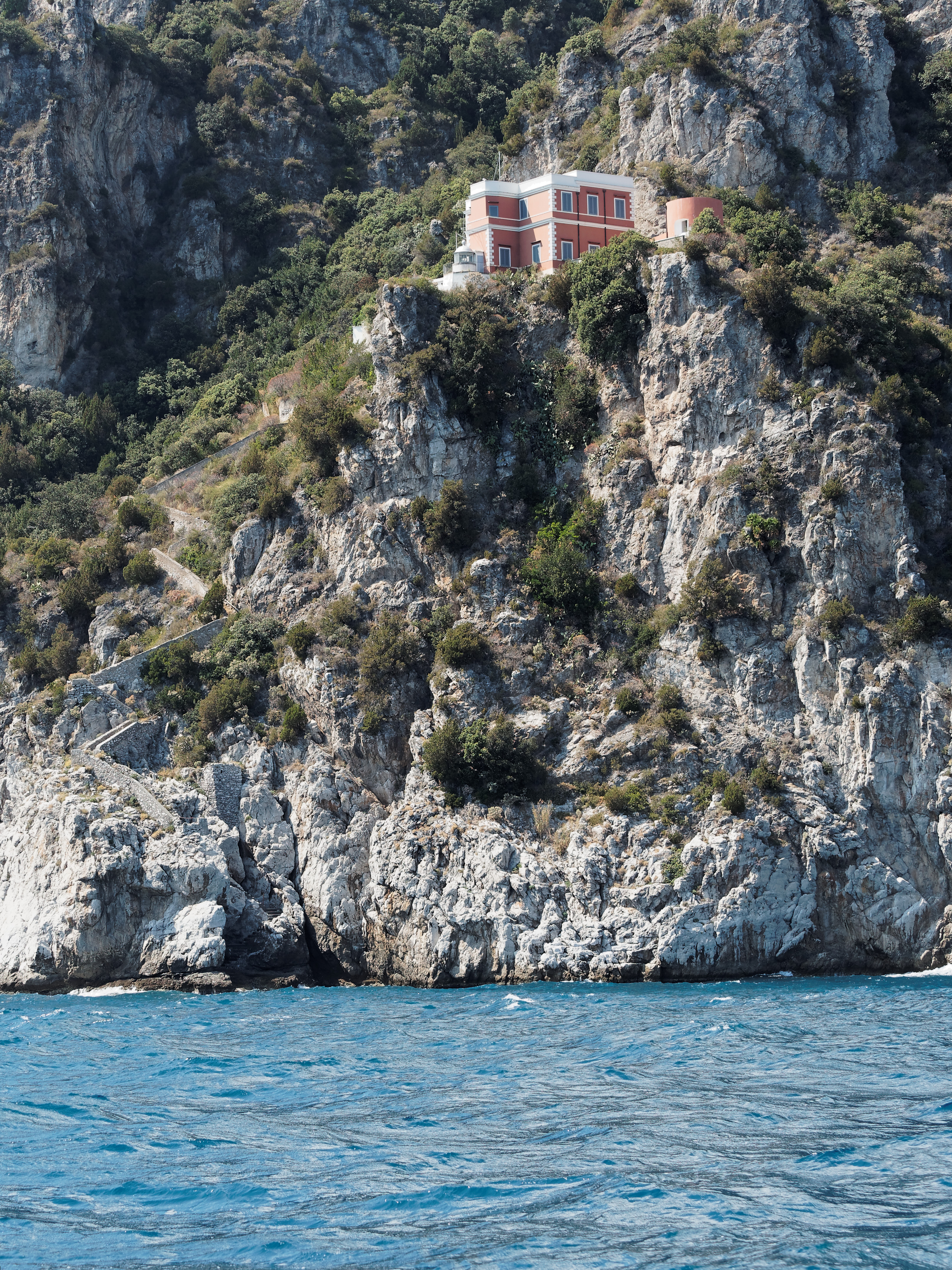
- Capo d'Orso Lighthouse
- Location: Maiori; Campania; Italy
- Coordinates: 40°37′59″N 14°40′51″E

Tower
- Constructed: 1862 (first)
- Construction: stone keeper's house
- Automated: yes
- Height: 5 metres (16 ft)
- Shape: no tower, lantern on a platform
- Markings: red building with white trim white lantern, grey metallic lantern dome
- Power source: mains electricity
- Operator: Marina Militare

Light
- First lit: 1882 (current)
- Focal height: 66 metres (217 ft)
- Lens: Type OF; Focal length: 500mm
- Intensity: AL 1000 W
- Range: main: 16 nautical miles (30 km; 18 mi) reserve: 12 nautical miles (22 km; 14 mi)
- Characteristic: Fl (3) W 15s.
- Italy no.: 2628 E.F.

Capo d'Orso Lighthouse (Italian: Faro di Capo d'Orso) is an active lighthouse located on the steep Amalfitan Coast in the municipality of Maiori, Campania on the Tyrrhenian Sea.

== Description ==
The first lighthouse was established in 1862 while the current one was built in 1882; it consists of a 2-storey red with white trim keeper's house and a white lantern mounted on a construction, 5 feet (1.5 m) high, on the seaside front. The lantern is positioned at 66 metres (217 ft) above sea level and emits three white flashes in a 15 seconds period, visible up to a distance of 16 nautical miles (30 km; 18 mi). The lighthouse is completely automated and is operated by the Marina Militare with the identification code number 2628 E.F.

== See also ==
- List of lighthouses in Italy
- Maiori
