= Capo d'Orso Lighthouse, Sardinia =

Lighthouse in Sardinia, Italy

Capo d'Orso
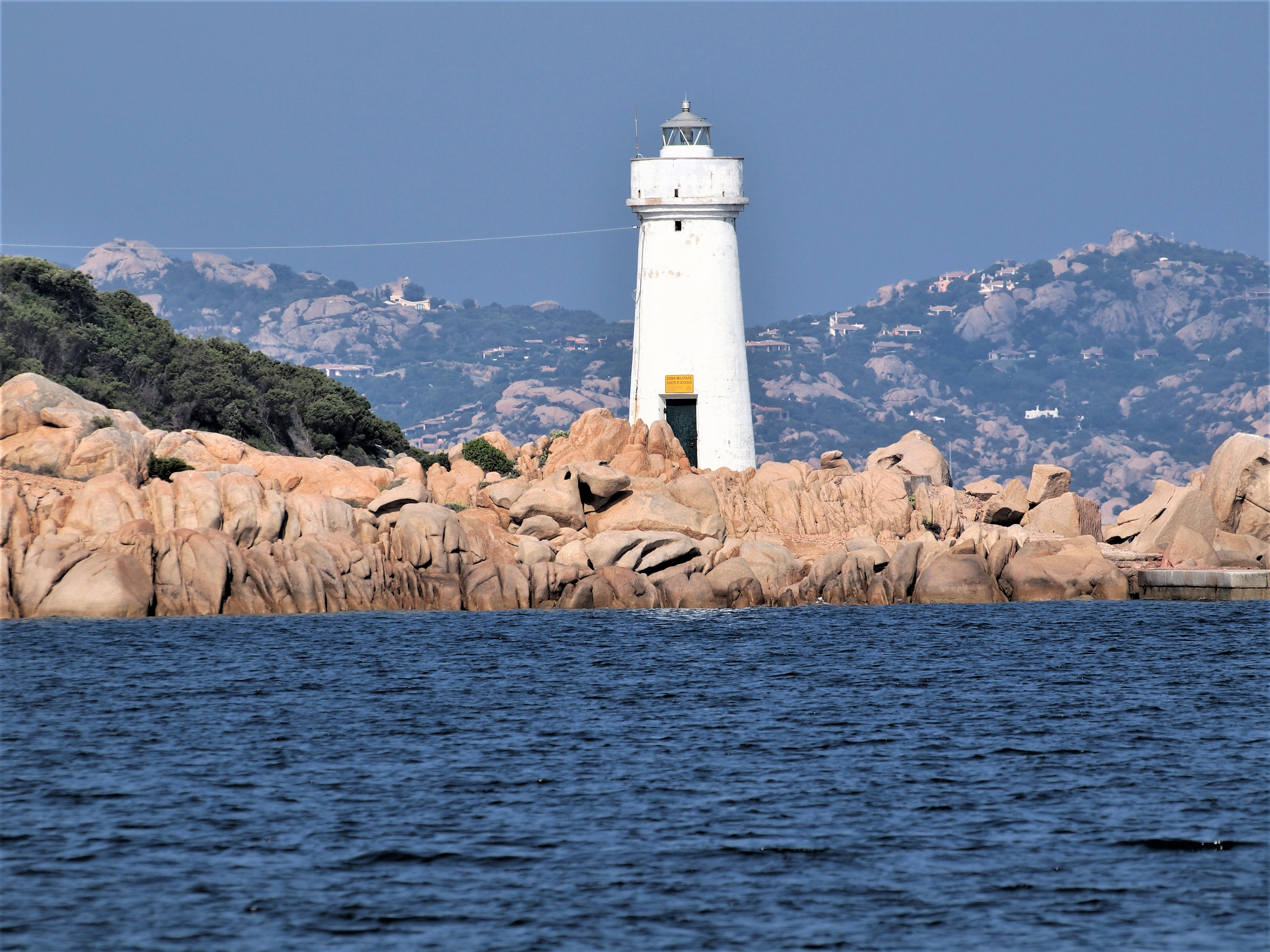
- Capo d'Orso Lighthouse
- Location: Capo d'Orso; Palau; Sardinia; Italy
- Coordinates: 41°10′40″N 9°25′23″E

Tower
- Constructed: 1924
- Foundation: concrete base
- Construction: masonry tower
- Automated: yes
- Height: 10 metres (33 ft)
- Shape: tapered cylindrical tower with balcony and lantern
- Markings: white tower and lantern, grey metallic lantern dome
- Power source: solar power
- Operator: Marina Militare
- Fog signal: no

Light
- First lit: 1960
- Focal height: 12 metres (39 ft)
- Lens: Type TD 300; Focal length : 150 mm
- Intensity: MaxiHalo-60 II EFF
- Range: 10 nautical miles (19 km; 12 mi)
- Characteristic: Fl W 3s.
- Italy no.: 1125 E.F.

Capo d'Orso Lighthouse (Italian: Faro di Capo d'Orso) is an active lighthouse located on the tip of Capo d'Orso promontory in front of the Maddalena archipelago, in the municipality of Palau, in the north east of Sardinia on the Tyrrhenian Sea.

== Description ==
The lighthouse was built in 1924 and consists of a masonry white tapered cylindrical tower, 10 metres (33 ft) high, with balcony and lantern. The lantern, which mounts an optics of Type TD 300 and Focal length of 150 mm., is painted in white and the dome in grey metallic; it is positioned at 12 metres (39 ft) above sea level and emits one white flash in a 3 seconds period visible up to a distance of 10 nautical miles (19 km; 12 mi). The lighthouse is completely automated and powered by a solar unit and managed by the Marina Militare with the identification code number 1125 E.F.

== See also ==
- List of lighthouses in Italy
- Palau
