= Cape St. Mary's =

Cape St. Mary's may refer to:

- Cape St. Mary's (Newfoundland and Labrador), Canada
- Cape St. Marys, Nova Scotia, Canada

== See also ==
- Cape St. Mary's Ecological Reserve, Newfoundland and Labrador, Canada
