= Monkdogz Urban Art =

Art gallery in Manhattan, New York

Coordinates: 40.75749°N 73.97067°W

Monkdogz Urban Art is an art gallery in the Chelsea neighborhood of Manhattan in New York City.

The gallery was founded in 2006 by co-owners Marina Hadley and Robert Hogge. The principal focus of Monkdogz is to discover and showcase contemporary emerging artists from around the world working in the different media of painting, drawing sculpture, photography, video and prints. In its first two years of opening, the gallery exhibited over 170 artists from 35 countries.

In September 2008, Monkdogz exhibited a solo show by French Artist Jean Marc Calvet, represented by Monkdogz, which will be part of a biographical feature documentary by award-winning director and producer Dominic Allan currently being filmed, titled “Calvet”.

Managing Editor of Gallery & Studio Magazine, Ed McCormack wrote:

“…the artists assembled under the Monkdogz banner make an auspicious debut and suggest a much needed shot in the arm for postmodern, post-movement art.”

Monkdogz Urban Art Inc. also maintains an International Art Network of over 2000 artists. It is a free web network designed for the International arts community, allowing artists from around the world to exhibit their work and link their own websites.

== Artists Represented ==
Sébastien Aurillon, Robert Hogge, Jean-Marc Calvet, Richard Pitts, Dario Posada, Yuichiro Shibata, Mari Yamagiwa

== See also ==
- List of museums and cultural institutions in New York City
