= Lucia Apicella =

Italian philanthropist

Lucia Apicella (18 November 1887 in Cava de' Tirreni – 23 July 1982 in Cava de' Tirreni) was an Italian philanthropist, nicknamed "Mamma Lucia" (Mother Lucy). Born and raised in Sant'Arcangelo of Cava de 'Tirreni, immediately after World War II strove to bury the corpses of German soldiers. She was a mother, and worked as a greengrocer.

== Wartime work ==
In September 1943 the Allied invasion of Italy, Operation Avalanche, took place. The main invasion force landed around Salerno on the western coast and its primary objectives was to seize the port of Naples to ensure resupply. The pathway from Salerno to Naples was the road, currently named "Strada statale 18 Tirrena Inferiore", which passes into the valley of Cava. Because of the relatively rapid advance of the Anglo-American forces toward Naples, hundreds of unburied bodies of the dead were left abandoned on the battlefields around Cava de' Tirreni.

Apicella was a religious woman and felt it her Christian duty to bury the remains of the German soldiers. After attending the scene where some children were kicking the skull of a soldier, and after dreaming of eight German soldiers begging her to hand over their bodies to their mothers, Apicella worked to find the remains of the fallen soldiers and put them back together in coffins of zinc. Her goal was to return the bodies to their mothers or, at least, to facilitate finding them.

During this work she risked injury or death from unexploded bombs and projectiles that were still present on the battlefields. She found more than 700 corpses, mostly of German but even sometimes of Italian and Allied soldiers.

The boxes of zinc, in which the remains of the soldiers were laid, were transported to the Catholic Church of Santa Maria della Pietà. It is the oldest church in the village Scacciaventi of Cava, where Apicella went to pray every morning until 1980, when, due to the 1980 Irpinia earthquake, the church was declared unfit for use. She died in 1982, aged 94.

== Order of Merit ==

Mamma Lucia received in August 1951 from Theodor Heuss, President of the Western Germany, the "Order of Merit of the Federal Republic of Germany – Grand Cross".

== See also ==
- Operation Avalanche
- Theodor Heuss

== Bibliography ==
- Pastore F.. Mutter der toten. Editore Palladio. Salerno 1980.
- Senatore, Raffaele. Mamma Lucia l'epopea di una Madre. Editore La Faiola. Salerno, 1990
