= Luca Bisogno =

Italian footballer

Personal information
- Date of birth: 18 June 2000 (age 26)
- Place of birth: Cava de' Tirreni, Italy
- Height: 1.87 m (6 ft 2 in)
- Position: Goalkeeper

Team information
- Current team: Viterbese
- Number: 1

Youth career
- Cavese

Senior career*
| Years | Team | Apps | (Gls) |
| 2017–2021 | Cavese | 54 | (0) |
| 2021 | → Viterbese (loan) | 1 | (0) |
| 2021– | Viterbese | 9 | (0) |
- * Club domestic league appearances and goals as of 22 December 2021

Luca Bisogno (born 18 June 2000) is an Italian professional footballer who plays as a goalkeeper for Promozione Lazio Group B club Viterbese.

== Career ==
Born in Cava de' Tirreni, Bisogno started his career in local club Cavese. He was promoted to the first team in 2017–18 Serie D season. The club won the promotion to Serie C this year, and Bisogno made his professional debut on 17 February 2019 against Viterbese, as a late substitute. On 9 September 2019, he extended his contract with the club.

On 1 February 2021, he was loaned to Viterbese. In July 2021, he signed with the club.
