= Cetara, Campania =

Town in Campania, Italy

Cetara
- Comune
- Comune di Cetara
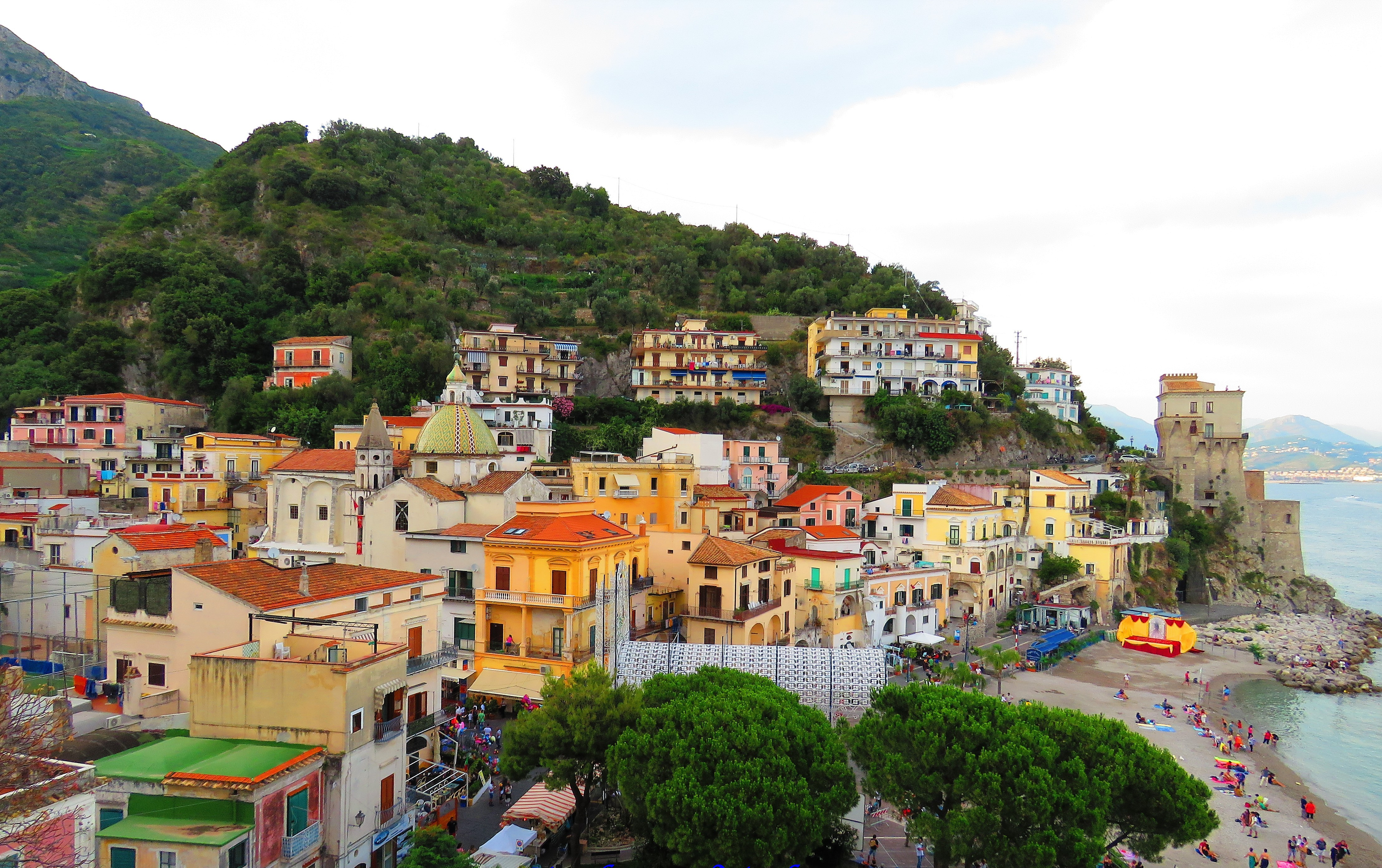
- Panoramic view of Cetara

- Coat of arms

- Location of the municipality of Cetara within the province of Salerno

- Location of Cetara in Italy Cetara (Campania)
- Coordinates: 40°39′N 14°42′E
- Country: Italy
- Region: Campania
- Province: Salerno (SA)
- Frazioni: Fuenti

Government
  - Mayor: Fortunato Della Monica (lista civica "Cetara D'Amare")

Area
  - Total: 4.97 km^{2} (1.92 sq mi)
- Elevation: 15 m (49 ft)

Population (30 June 2025)
  - Total: 1,902
  - Density: 383/km^{2} (991/sq mi)
- Demonym: Cetaresi
- Time zone: UTC+1 (CET)
  - Summer (DST): UTC+2 (CEST)
- Postal code: 84011
- Dialing code: 089
- ISTAT code: 065041
- Patron saint: Saint Peter
- Saint day: 29 June
- Website: Official website

UNESCO World Heritage Site
- Part of: Costiera Amalfitana
- Criteria: Cultural: (ii)(iv)
- Reference: 830
- Inscription: 1997 (21st Session)
- Area: 11,206 ha (27,690 acres)
- Buffer zone: 11,857 ha (29,300 acres)

Cetara is a town and comune in the province of Salerno in the Campania region of south-western Italy. It is located in the territory of the Amalfi Coast.

== Geography ==
Cetara is located by the Tyrrhenian Sea, on the Amalfi Drive road between the "Marina" of Albori and Erchie, bordering with the municipalities of Vietri sul Mare and Maiori. Its municipalities is extended from the coast to the Mount Falerio and counts only one civil parish (frazione): the little village of Fuenti, situated on the hills close to the Amalfi Drive.

== History ==
It was originally a base of an Arab army during the Siege of Salerno. Characterized to be a village of fishermen (especially of tuna), its name take origins probably from the Latin word Cetaria (in Greek Ketèia), meaning almadraba (in Italian tonnara); or cetari, meaning fishmongers of big fishes.

== Monuments and places of interest ==
- Tower of Cetara (16th century) was built during the Angevin period, and was later transformed and further fortified during the Aragonese domination.
- Church and Convent of San Francesco (17th century), whose dome of the single existing nave was frescoed by the painter Marco Benincasa;
- Church of San Pietro Apostolo, renovated in the 18th century, has a Baroque interior, with a majolica dome and a 13th-century bell tower with mullioned windows, and an octagonal belfry.
- Church of Santa Maria di Costantinopoli (19th century).

== Culture ==
=== Cinema ===
Cetara has been used as a film set for the films Man, the Beast, and Virtue, Chestnuts Are Good, Sgarro alla Camorra, Lie, The Sea Is No Comparison, the TV series I Diavoli, and the drama Capri 2.

=== Cuisine ===
Cetara's traditional cuisine is essentially seafood-based (especially tuna and anchovies). A typical dish is spaghetti with anchovy sauce, which is the result of fermenting anchovies marinated in jars: the ancient Roman "garum." Another popular local delicacy is the so-called "cuòppo," a paper bag containing fish prepared and fried in various ways, especially anchovies and mixed fish.

=== Events ===
Procession of Saint Peter: the patronal feast of Saint Peter takes place on June 29th, accompanied by fireworks over the sea.

== Infrastructure and transport ==
- Roads: Cetara is served by State Road 163 Amalfitana, the main access road to the municipality; Provincial Road 304, SS 163-Fuenti junction towards Cetara.
- Railway: the closest station to Cetara is the Vietri Sul Mare-Amalfi on the Naples-Salerno railway line.
- Port: the municipality has a marina and a small beach that ends with the ancient tower.

== See also ==
- Amalfi Coast
- Sorrentine Peninsula
