= Maiori =

- Comune
- Comune di Maiori
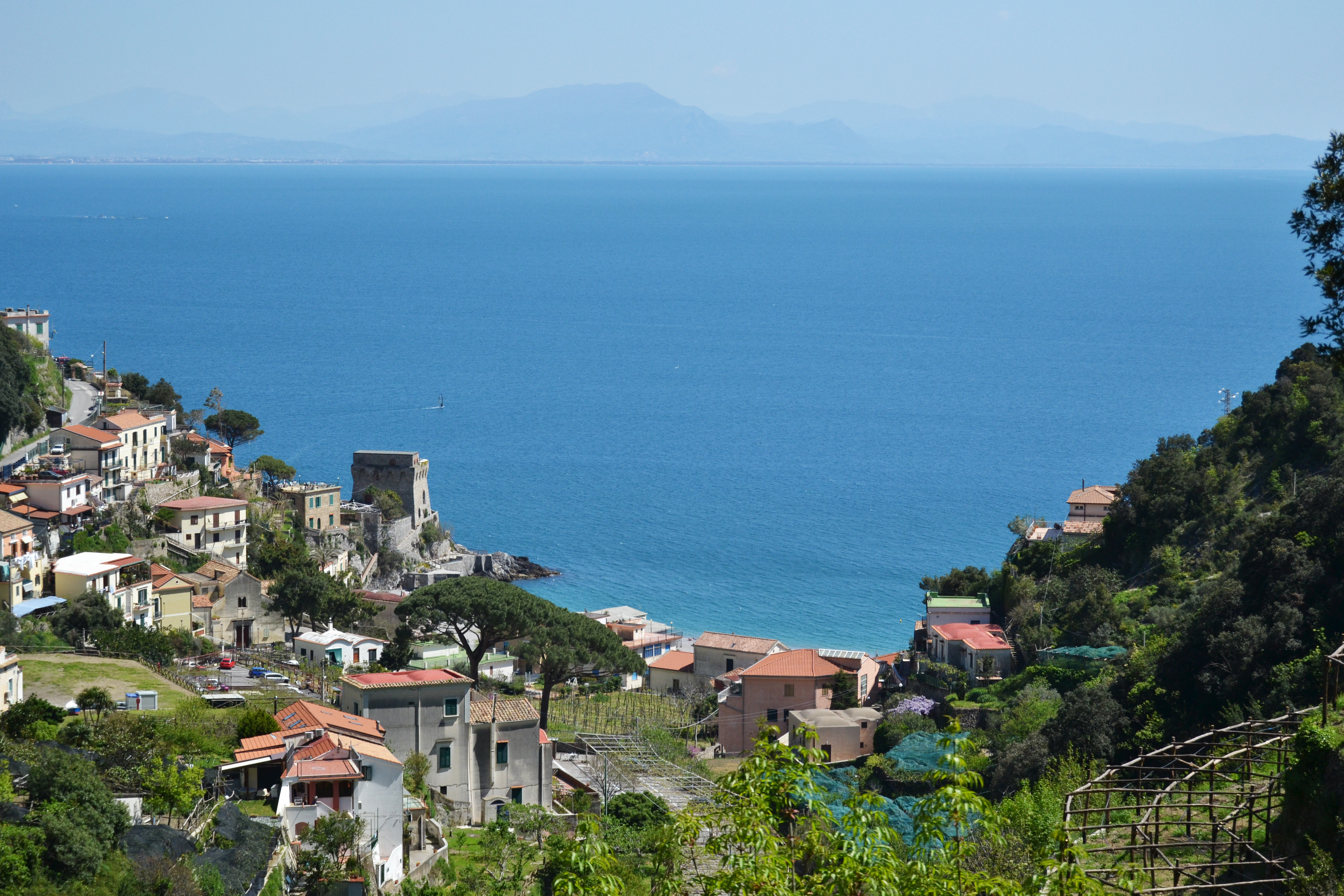

- Coat of arms

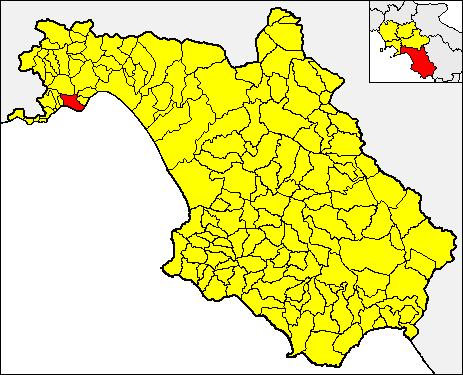
- Maiori within the Province of Salerno

- Location within Italy Location within Campania
- Coordinates: 40°39′N 14°39′E
- Country: Italy
- Region: Campania
- Province: Salerno (SA)
- Frazioni: Erchie, Ponteprimario, San Pietro, Santa Maria delle Grazie, Vecite

Government
  - Mayor: Antonio Capone

Area
  - Total: 16.67 km^{2} (6.44 sq mi)
- Elevation: 5 m (16 ft)

Population (30 September 2017)
  - Total: 5,604
  - Density: 336.2/km^{2} (870.7/sq mi)
- Demonym: Maioresi
- Time zone: UTC+1 (CET)
  - Summer (DST): UTC+2 (CEST)
- Postal code: 84010
- Dialing code: 089
- Patron saint: Santa Maria a Mare
- Saint day: 15 August
- Website: Official website

UNESCO World Heritage Site
- Part of: Costiera Amalfitana
- Criteria: Cultural: (ii)(iv)
- Reference: 830
- Inscription: 1997 (21st Session)
- Area: 11,206 ha (27,690 acres)
- Buffer zone: 11,857 ha (29,300 acres)

Maiori (originally in Latin: Rheginna Maior) is a town and comune on the Amalfi coast in the province of Salerno (Campania, Italy). It has been a popular tourist resort since Roman times, with the longest unbroken stretch of beach on the Amalfi coastline.

== History ==
The origins of the town are unclear, though it was likely founded by the Etruscans. It was conquered by the Romans in the 3rd century BC, who called the town Rheginna Maior, in contrast to the neighbouring town, Minori, Rheginna Minor. All places along the coast were formed by alternating conquerors - such as the Etruscans or the Romans.

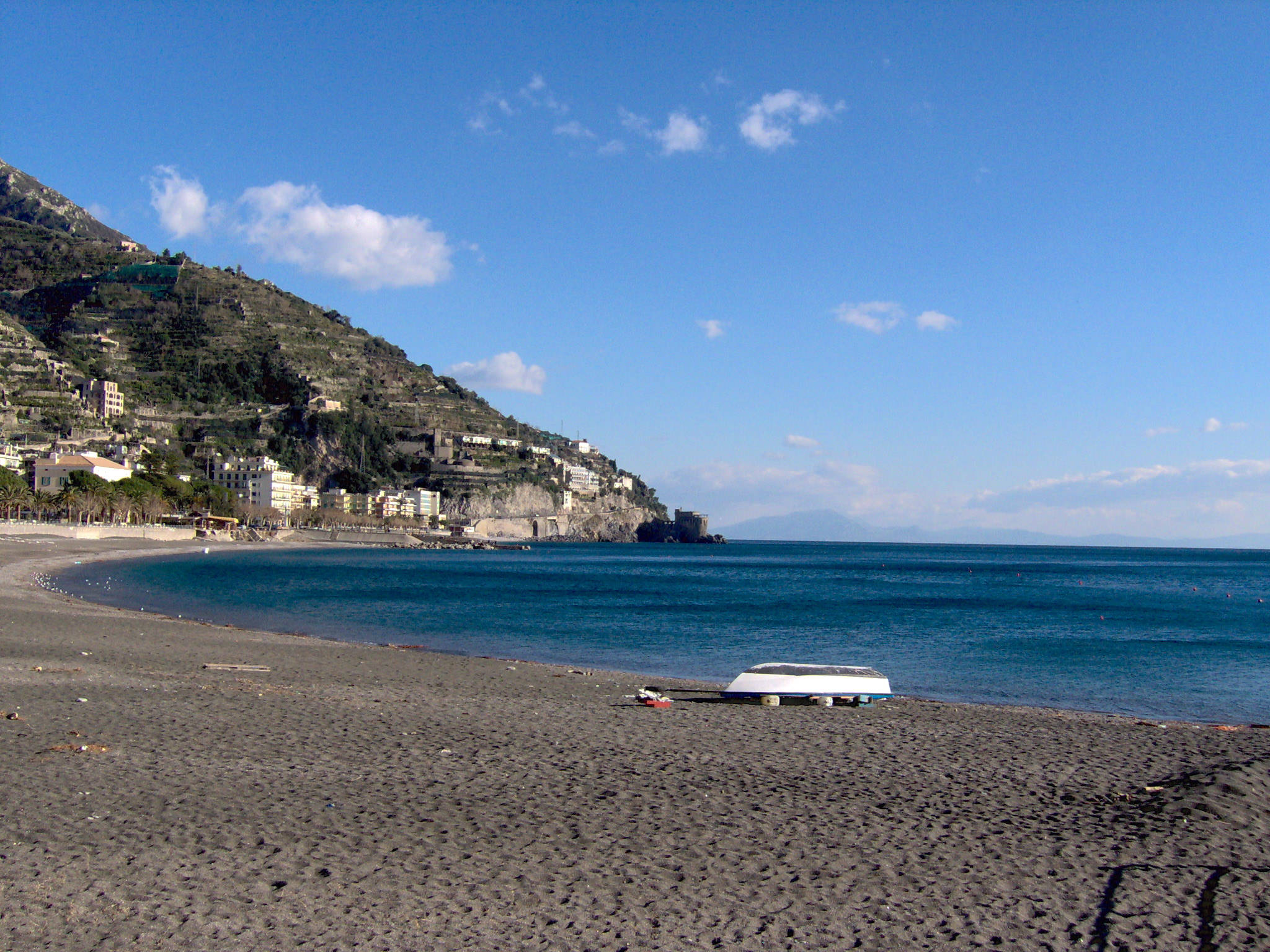
Beach of Maiori.

Between 830 and 840, the towns of the coast between Lettere and Tramonti and Cetara and Positano, including the island of Capri, united to form a confederation of states later known as the Duchy of Amalfi. Each city retained its own name and administrative autonomy, but had a specific role in this federation. Maiori was the seat of the duchy's admiralty, the customs, the salt market and several arsenals.

Around 1000 it became part of the Principality of Salerno, and then of the Kingdom of Naples, of which it followed the history until the 19th century.

== Main sights ==
- Collegiate Church of Santa Maria a Mare (13th century). It has a colourful maiolica tiled dome topping the 14th century bell tower, while most of the exterior dates from the 18th century. Other majolicas are shown in the Sacred Art Museum just next to the Church.
- Church of San Francesco (finished in 1590), now in late Rococo style.
- Santa Maria de Olearia (11th century), a Benedictine Abbey founded in 973 just above the historical centre of the town.
- Falerzio Mount and Avvocata Church. The highest peak of the Amalfi Coast and the Sanctuary on the plain above Mount Mirteto.
- Castle of San Nicola (9th century)
- Norman Tower (also called Torre Salicerchio)

== Transport ==
The nearest airport is Salerno-Pontecagnano Airport (QSR).

== In film ==
In the mid-20th century, Roberto Rossellini filmed some of his films here: Paisà (1946); "Il Miracolo" ("The Miracle"), the second episode of the movie L'Amore (Ways of Love, 1948); La macchina ammazzacattivi (Machine to Kill Bad People, 1952); and Il viaggio in Italia (Journey to Italy, 1953). A film festival is held every November at which the Premio Internazionale Roberto Rossellini is awarded.

== See also ==
- Erchie (Maiori)
- Amalfi Coast
- Sorrentine Peninsula
- Capo d'Orso Lighthouse
