= Michele de Bologna =

Most Reverend Michele de Bologna
- Archbishop of Amalfi
- Church: Catholic Church
- Archdiocese: Archdiocese of Amalfi
- In office: 1701–1731
- Predecessor: Simplicio Caravita
- Successor: Pietro Agostino Scorza
- Previous post: Bishop of Isernia (1690–1698)

Orders
- Ordination: October 1663
- Consecration: 12 March 1690 by Pietro Francesco Orsini de Gravina

Personal details
- Born: 29 September 1647 Somma, Italy
- Died: 24 February 1731 (aged 83) Amalfi, Italy (age 83)

Michele de Bologna, C.R. (1647–1731) was a Roman Catholic prelate who served as Archbishop of Amalfi (1701–1731) and Bishop of Isernia (1690–1698).

== Biography ==
Michele de Bologna was born in Somma, Italy, on 29 September 1647 and ordained a priest in the Congregation of Clerics Regular of the Divine Providence in October 1663. On 6 March 1690, he was appointed during the papacy of Pope Alexander VIII as Bishop of Isernia. On 12 March 1690, he was consecrated bishop by Pietro Francesco Orsini de Gravina, Archbishop of Benevento, with Giuseppe Bologna, Archbishop Emeritus of Benevento, and Gregorio Giuseppe Gaetani de Aragonia, Titular Archbishop of Neocaesarea in Ponto, serving as co-consecrators. He resigned on 11 December 1698.

On 14 March 1701, he was appointed during the papacy of Pope Clement XI as Archbishop of Amalfi. He served as Archbishop of Amalfi until his death on 24 February 1731, restyling the Cathedral during his time in office there.

== Episcopal succession ==
While bishop, he was the principal co-consecrator of:

- Giuseppe Maria Pignatelli, Bishop of Cava de' Tirreni (1696);
- Lorenzo Fabri, Bishop of Fossombrone (1697);
- Giacinto della Calce, Bishop of Ariano (1697); and
- Tommaso Maria Franza, Bishop of Oria (1697).

== External links and additional sources ==
- Cheney, David M. "Diocese of Isernia-Venafro". Catholic-Hierarchy.org. (for Chronology of Bishops) ^{[self-published]}
- Chow, Gabriel. "Diocese of Isernia-Venafro (Italy)". GCatholic.org. (for Chronology of Bishops) ^{[self-published]}
- Cheney, David M. "Archdiocese of Amalfi-Cava de' Tirreni". Catholic-Hierarchy.org. (for Chronology of Bishops) ^{[self-published]}
- Chow, Gabriel. "Archdiocese of Amalfi-Cava de' Tirreni (Italy)". GCatholic.org. (for Chronology of Bishops) ^{[self-published]}

Catholic Church titles
Preceded by Gerolamo Passarelli	Bishop of Isernia; 1690–1698	Succeeded by Biagio Terzi
Preceded by Simplicio Caravita	Archbishop of Amalfi; 1701–1731	Succeeded by Pietro Agostino Scorza
