= Diocesan Museum of Amalfi =

Coordinates: 40°37′48″N 14°36′0″E

The Diocesan Museum of Amalfi (Museo Diocesano di Amalfi) is an art museum housed in the 9th century Basilica del Crocifisso di Amalfi (Basilica of the Crucifix) in Amalfi. It displays many of the treasures of the Archdiocese of Amalfi-Cava de' Tirreni and is centrally located close to Amalfi Cathedral in Via Salita Episcopio.

== History ==
The Museum is housed in the Basilica of the Crucifix – originally the Cathedral Church – whose origin dates back to the year 596. In 1100, the new cathedral was built next to it and together formed a single church of Romanesque style with six aisles. Later, in the Baroque period, they were covered with marble and stucco and restored as two separate and distinct churches. The restoration of the Basilica of the Crucifix, which was completed in 1994, eliminated the Baroque style, bringing out a very considerable portion of the medieval structure with the gallery of single and double windows that filter and distribute a magnificent light. The museum opened in 1996.

== Organisation ==
The museum's itinerary is developed in four sections:

- The Cloister (built between the 1266 and 1268);
- The Wall paintings (mural paintings and frescoes, dating from the 13th century to the 14th century);
- The Cathedral Treasury (precious liturgical objects and sacred paraments, belonging to the Treasure of the Cathedral);
- The Paintings and sculptures (preserves valuable paintings and sculptures).

=== Section I ===
Along the galleries of the cloister, works from the cathedral are preserved, including:

- Greek sarcophagus with Rape of Proserpine (first half of 2nd century AD).
- Roman sarcophagus with Marriage of Peleus and Thetis (second half of the 2nd century AD), reused in the early Middle Ages as the tomb of Archbishop Cesarius de Alanio.
- Remains of Romanesque ambon (1174 –1202) decorated with mosaics of the Cosmatesque school.

== Gallery ==
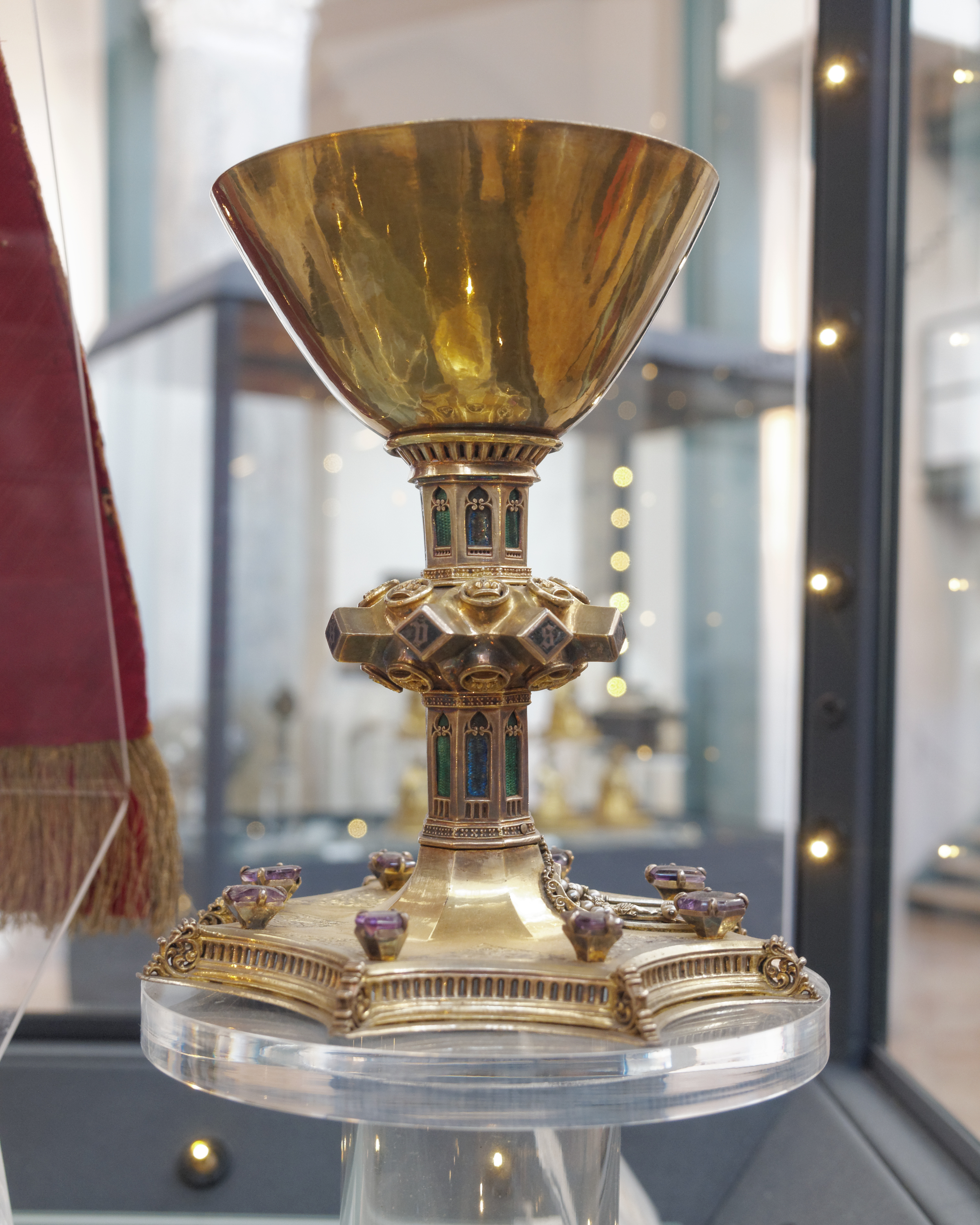
Chalice

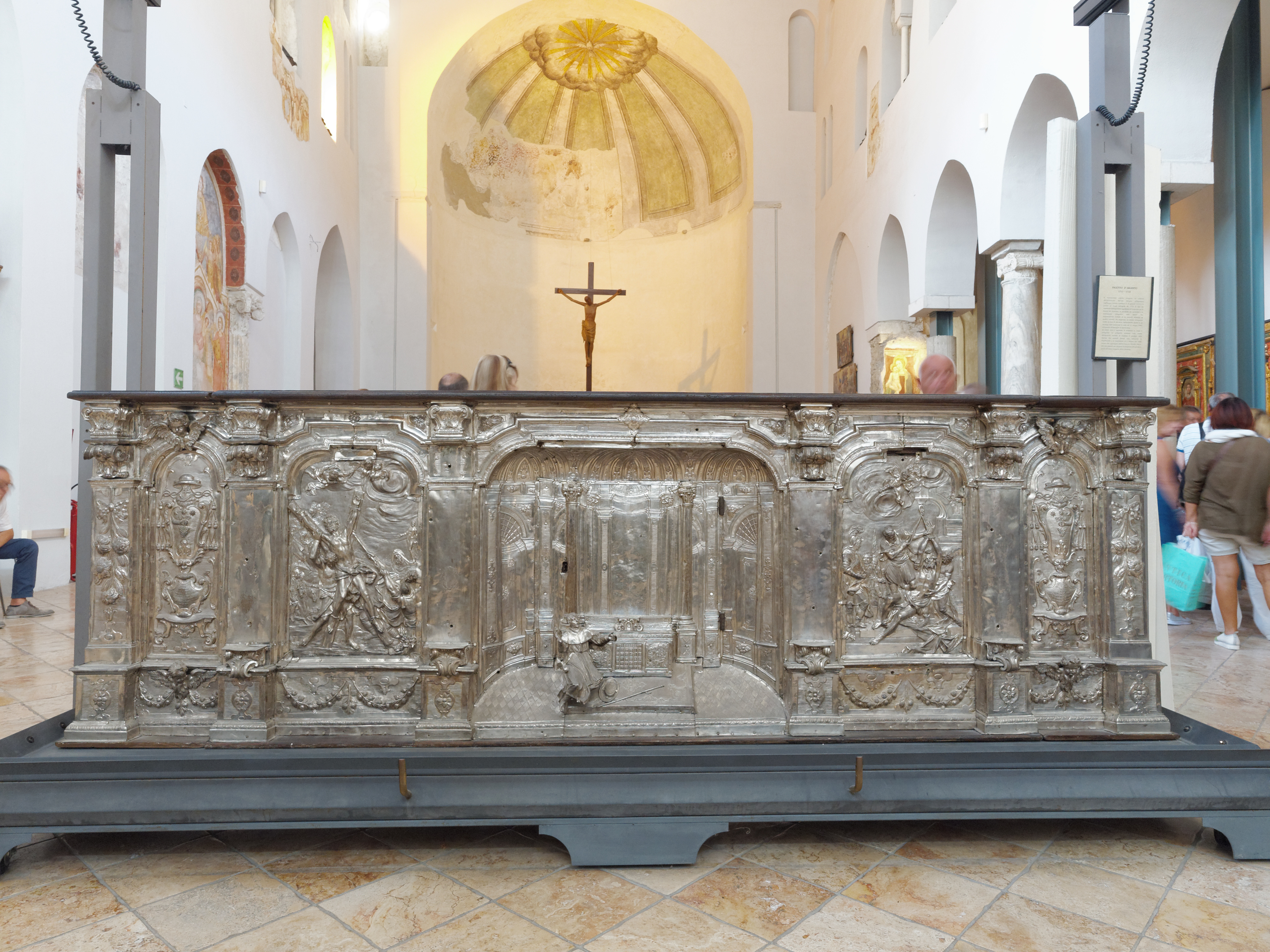

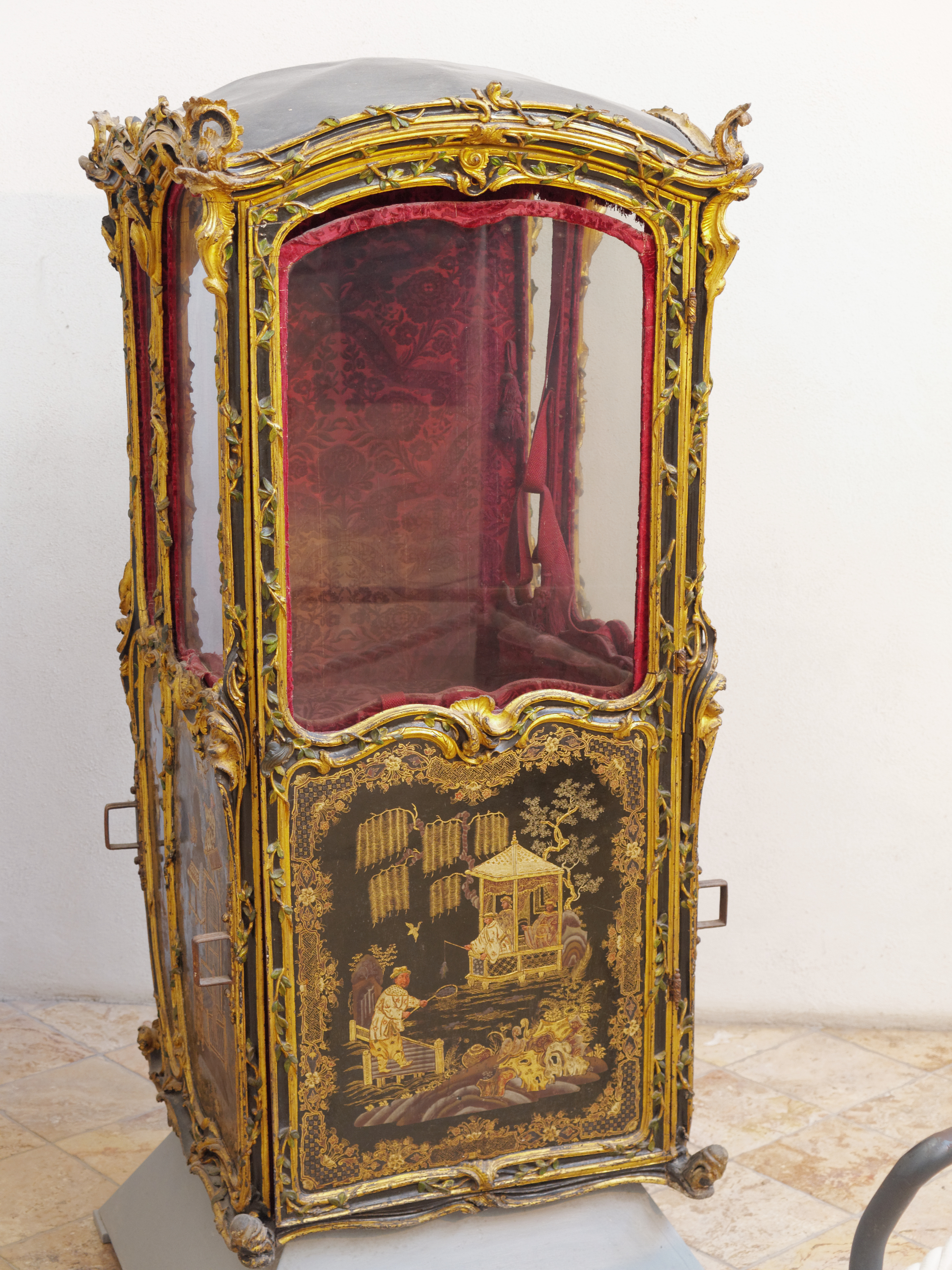

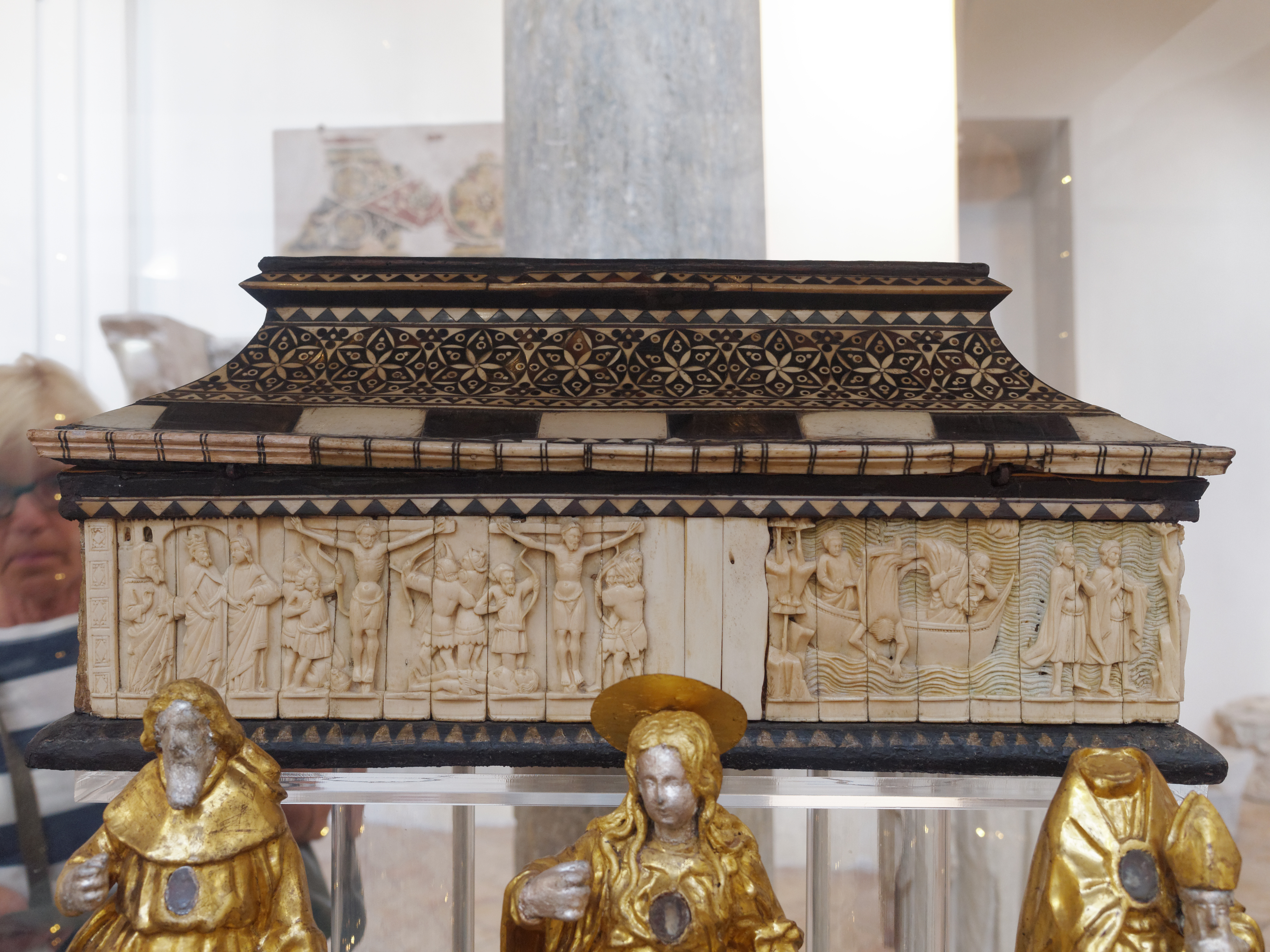

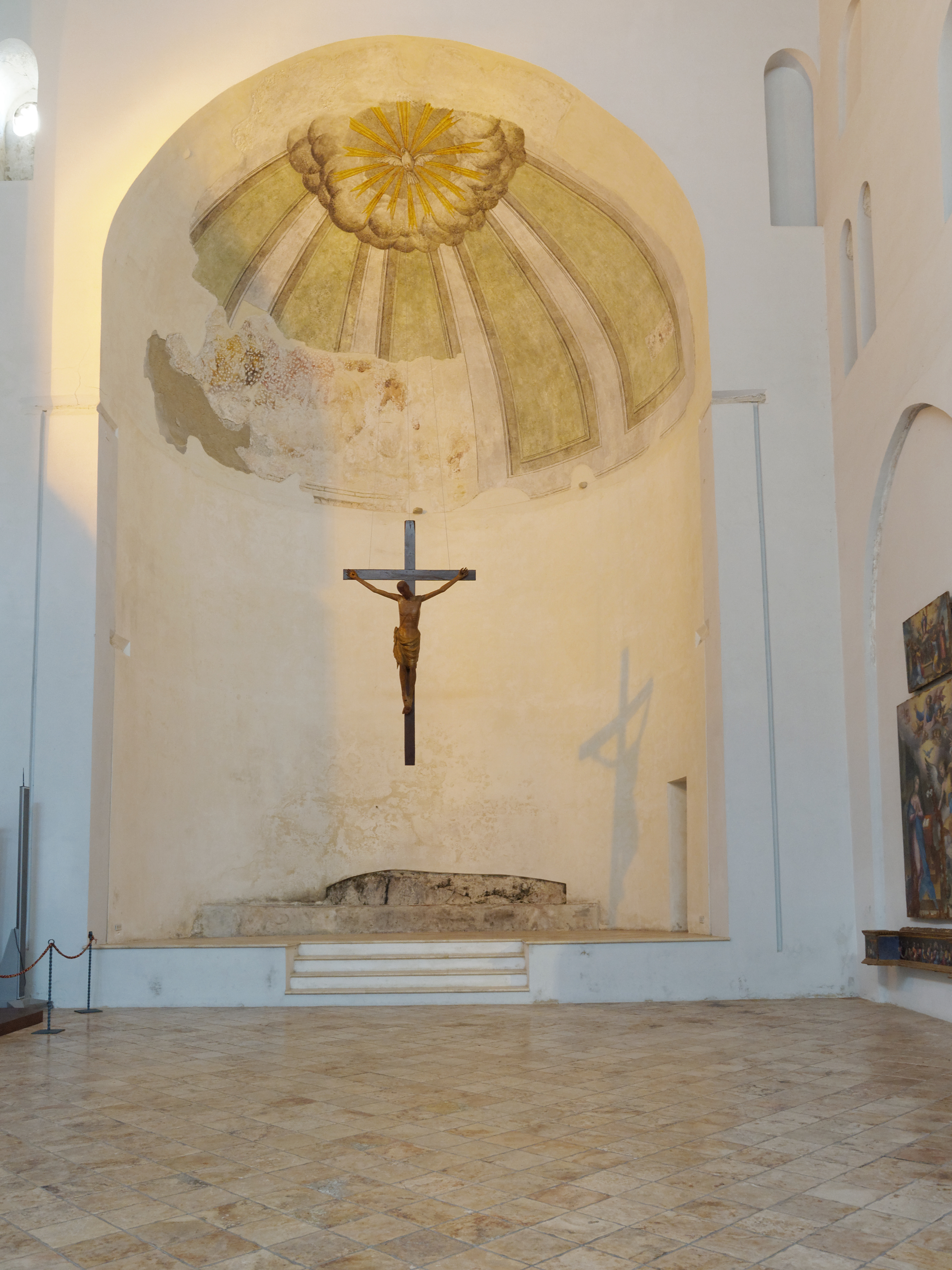

== Bibliography ==
- Erminia Giacomini Miari, Paola Mariani, Musei religiosi in Italia, Editore Touring, Milan 2005, p. 41 ISBN 9788836536535
- Stefano Zuffi, I Musei Diocesani in Italia, vol. 3, Editore San Paolo, Palazzolo sull'Oglio (BS) 2003, pp. 34–41
