= Amalfian Laws =

Code of maritime laws compiled in the 12th century

The Amalfian Laws are a code of maritime laws compiled in the 12th century in Amalfi, a town in Italy.

They took the form of the Tabula Amalfitana (Amalfi's Board), and were for centuries the international mercantile code accepted and taken as a model.

== Overview and examples ==
The Laws of Amalfi, also known as the Amalphitan Code, were a set of maritime laws created in the 11th century in the town of Amalfi, Italy. These laws were used to regulate trade and shipping in the Mediterranean Sea.

For example, one of the laws stated that if a ship was damaged during a storm, the crew and cargo should be saved before the ship itself. This was to ensure the safety of human life and valuable goods. Another law stated that if a sailor was injured while working on a ship, they were entitled to compensation from the ship's owner. This was to protect the rights and well-being of the sailors who risked their lives at sea.

These examples illustrate how the laws were designed to promote safety and fairness in maritime trade. They were an important step in the development of international maritime law and influenced similar codes in other parts of the world.

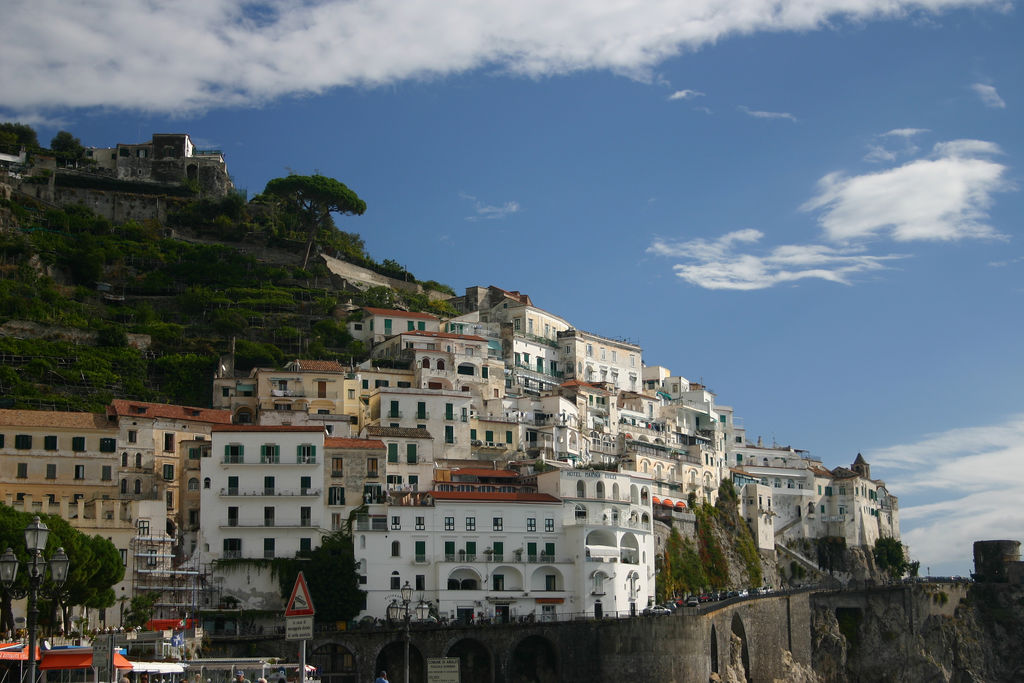
The town of Amalfi
