= Giuseppe Maria Pignatelli =

Most Reverend Giuseppe Maria Pignatelli
- Bishop of Cava de' Tirreni
- Church: Catholic Church
- Diocese: Diocese of Cava de' Tirreni
- In office: 1696–1703
- Predecessor: Giovanni Battista Giberti
- Successor: Marino Carmignano

Orders
- Consecration: 21 December 1696 by Sperello Sperelli

Personal details
- Born: 1660 Naples, Italy
- Died: 22 March 1703 (age 43)

Giuseppe Maria Pignatelli, C.R. (1660–1703) was a Roman Catholic prelate who served as Bishop of Cava de' Tirreni (1696–1703).

== Biography ==
Giuseppe Maria Pignatelli was born in Naples, Italy in 1660 and ordained a priest in the Congregation of Clerics Regular of the Divine Providence. On 17 December 1696, he was appointed during the papacy of Pope Innocent XII as Bishop of Cava de' Tirreni. On 21 December 1696, he was consecrated bishop by Sperello Sperelli, Bishop of Terni, with Michele de Bologna, Bishop of Isernia, and François Marie Sacco, Bishop of Ajaccio, serving as co-consecrators. He was responsible for the construction of the episcopal palace in Cava. He served as Bishop of Cava de' Tirreni until his death on 22 March 1703.

== External links and additional sources ==
- Cheney, David M. "Diocese of Cava e Sarno". Catholic-Hierarchy.org. (for Chronology of Bishops)^{self-published}
- Chow, Gabriel. "Diocese of Cava de' Tirreni". GCatholic.org. (for Chronology of Bishops)^{self-published}

Catholic Church titles
Preceded by Giovanni Battista Giberti	Bishop of Cava de' Tirreni; 1696–1703	Succeeded by Marino Carmignano
