= Roman Catholic Diocese of Cava de' Tirreni =

Diocese of Cava de' Tirreni

Location
- Country: Italy

Information
- Denomination: Roman Catholic
- Established: 7 August 1394
- Dissolved: 1986

Leadership
- Pope: Leo XIV

Map
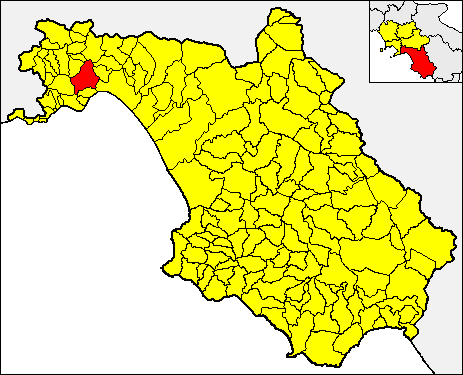

The Diocese of Cava (de' Tirreni) was a Roman Catholic diocese located in the Italian region Campania. It existed from 1394 to 1986, and was informally known as Cava and Sarno (Cava e Sarno) from 27 June 1818 to 25 September 1972 while in union (aeque principaliter) with the neighboring Diocese of Sarno.

== History ==
The Diocese of Cava was established by Pope Boniface IX (Roman Obedience) on 7 August 1394 (centered on the monastery of La Trinità della Cava), on territory split off from the Metropolitan Archdiocese of Salerno. To facilitate the change, Liguori Majorini, the abbot of Santissima Trinità di Cava, was named Archbishop of Salerno, and in the vacancy Francesco d'Aiello, a canon of Salerno, was appointed the first bishop. The abbey church became the Cathedral of the diocese, and monks of the abbey formed the Cathedral Chapter, whose head was the Prior.

In 1513 the diocese lost territory to establish the Territorial Abbacy of Santissima Trinità di Cava de' Tirreni.

=== Concordat of 1818 ===
Following the extinction of the Napoleonic Kingdom of Italy, the Congress of Vienna authorized the restoration of the Papal States and the Kingdom of Naples. Since the French occupation had seen the abolition of many Church institutions in the Kingdom, as well as the confiscation of most Church property and resources, it was imperative that Pope Pius VII and King Ferdinand IV reach agreement on restoration and restitution. Ferdinand, however, was not prepared to accept the pre-Napoleonic situation, in which Naples was a feudal subject of the papacy. Lengthy, detailed, and acrimonious negotiations ensued.

In 1818, a new concordat with the Kingdom of the Two Sicilies committed the pope to the suppression of more than fifty small dioceses in the kingdom. In the bull "De Utiliori" of 27 June 1818, Pope Pius VII permanently suppressed the diocese of Diocese of Nocera de' Pagani (Nuceria Paganorum), and its territory was assigned to the diocese of Cava de'Tirreni. At the same time Pope Pius VII reduced the cathedral of Sarno to the rank of co-cathedral, and united the diocese of Sarno with that of Cava aeque principaliter (two separate dioceses, each governed by one and the same bishop, the result to be known as Diocese of Cava and Sarno.

On 7 December 1833, in the Bull In vinea Domini, Pope Gregory XVI restored the diocese of Nocera de' Pagani, and assigned it the territory which it had lost fifteen years earlier to the diocese of Cava. On 21 September 1850 the diocese of Cava lost territory to establish the Diocese of Diano–Teggiano.

=== Suppression of diocese ===
Following the Second Vatican Council, and in accordance with the norms laid out in the council's decree, Christus Dominus chapter 40, Pope Paul VI ordered a reorganization of the ecclesiastical provinces in southern Italy.

Subsequently, a revised Concordat was agreed between the Vatican and the Italian Republic on 18 February 1984. After extensive consultations, Pope John Paul II decreed that the status of the bishop governing several dioceses aeque personaliter was abolished, and other changes were ordered.

By a decree of the Sacred Congregation of Bishops, with the approval of the pope, the diocese of Cava was suppressed on 30 September 1986. The cathedral of Cava de' Tirreni was renamed a co-cathedral, and its Chapter retitled the Chapter of the co-cathedral.The priests and deacons of the former diocese were incardinated in the Archdiocese of Amalfi-Cava de'Terreni. The territories of the former diocese of Cava were divided. Cava de Tirreni merged with the Metropolitan Archdiocese of Amalfi as Roman Catholic Archdiocese of Amalfi-Cava de' Tirreni, while the territory of the former diocese of Sarno merged with the restored diocese of Nuceria Paganorum to form the diocese of Nocera Inferiore-Sarno.

== Bishops ==
(all Roman rite)

=== Bishops of Cava ===
==== from 1394 to 1550 ====
- Francesco de Aiello (1394–1407)
- Francesco Mormile (1408–1419)
- Sagace dei Conti (1419–1426)
- it:Angelotto Fosco (1426.05.22 – 1431) and Administrator (1431–1444)
- Ludovico Scarampi-Mezzarota Trevisano (1444.09.03 – 1465.03.22) Apostolic Administrator
- Giovanni d'Aragona (1465 – 1485.10.17) Apostolic Administrator
- Oliviero Carafa (1485–1497) Apostolic Administrator
- Arsenio da Terracina (1497–1498)
- Paolo da Milano first time (1498–1499 see below)
- Giustino da Taderico-Harbès first time (1499–1501 see below)
- Vincenzo De Riso (1501–1503)
- Giustino da Taderico-Harbès second time (see above 1503–1504)
- Michele Tarsia (1504–1506)
- Benedetto da Vicenza (1506–1507)
- Paolo da Milano second time (see above 1507–1511)

○ Luigi d'Aragona (1511 – 5 May 1514 Resigned) Apostolic Administrator

- Pietro de Sanfelice (1514–1520)
- Joannes Thomas Sanfelice (14 March 1520 – 1550)

==== from 1550 to 1818 ====
- Thomas Caselius, O.P. (3 October 1550 – 1572)
- Cesare de Alamaña y Cardoña (della Magna) (2 June 1572 – 1606)
- Cesare Lippi, O.F.M.Conv. (11 December 1606 – May 1622).
- Matteo Granito (26 October 1622 – 17 September 1635)
- Gerolamo Lanfranchi (12 January 1637 – 1660?)
- Luigi di Gennaro (5 April 1660 – 1670
- Gaetano d'Afflitto, O.Theat. (30 June 1670 – April 1682)
- Giovanni Battista Giberti (15 February 1683 – 17 December 1696)
- Giuseppe Maria Pignatelli, O.Theat. (17 December 1696 – March 1703)
- Marino Carmignano (17 December 1703 – December 1729)
- Domenico Maria de'Liguori, O.Theat. (8 February 1730 – May 1751)
- Nicolaus Borgia (5 July 1751 – 27 March 1765)
- Pietro di Gennaro (5 August 1765 – 17 May 1778)
- Michael Tafuri (1778 – c. 1803)

Sede vacante (c. 1803 – 1818)

=== Bishops of Cava (and Sarno) ===
- Silvestro Granito, 1818–1832
- Tommaso Bellacosa, 1834–1843
- Salvatore Fertitta, 1844–1873
- Giuseppe Carrano, 1874–1890
- Giuseppe Izzo, 1890–1914
- Luigi Lavitrano, 1914–1924
- Pasquale Dell'Isola, 1928–1938
- Francesco Marchesani, 1939–1948
- Gennaro Fenizia, 1948–1952
- Alfredo Vozzi, 1953–1972
- Jolando Nuzzi, 1972–1982
- Ferdinando Palatucci, 1982–1986

30 September 1986: the diocese of Cava was suppressed, and its historical territories united with the Archdiocese of Amalfi to form the Archdiocese of Amalfi-Cava de' Tirreni. The former Diocese of Sarno was united with the Diocese of Nocera de' Pagani to form the Diocese of Nocera Inferiore-Sarno.

== See also ==
- La Trinità della Cava

== Books ==
=== Reference Works ===
- Eubel, Conradus, ed. (1913). Hierarchia catholica (in Latin). Vol. 1 (Tomus 1) (second ed.). Münster: Libreria Regensbergiana. pp. 181–182.. Archived.
- Eubel, Conradus, ed. (1914). Hierarchia catholica (in Latin). Vol. 2 (Tomus 2) (second ed.). Münster: Libreria Regensbergiana. p. 125.. Archived.
- Eubel, Conradus, ed. (1923). Hierarchia catholica (in Latin). Vol. 3 (Tomus 3) (second ed.). Münster: Libreria Regensbergiana. p. 163.. Archived.
- Gams, Pius Bonifatius (1873). Series episcoporum Ecclesiae catholicae: quotquot innotuerunt a beato Petro apostolo. Ratisbon: Typis et Sumptibus Georgii Josephi Manz. pp. 946–947. (Use with caution; obsolete)
- Gauchat, Patritius (Patrice) (1935). Hierarchia catholica (in Latin). Vol. IV (1592-1667). Münster: Libraria Regensbergiana.
- Ritzler, Remigius; Sefrin, Pirminus (1952). Hierarchia catholica medii et recentis aevi (in Latin). Vol. V (1667-1730). Patavii: Messagero di S. Antonio.
- Ritzler, Remigius; Sefrin, Pirminus (1958). Hierarchia catholica medii et recentis aevi (in Latin). Vol. 6 (1730-1799). Patavii: Messagero di S. Antonio.
- Ritzler, Remigius; Sefrin, Pirminus (1968). Hierarchia Catholica medii et recentioris aevi (in Latin). Vol. 7 (1800–1846). Monasterii: Libr. Regensburgiana.
- Ritzler, Remigius; Sefrin, Pirminus (1978). Hierarchia catholica Medii et recentioris aevi (in Latin). Vol. 8 (1846–1903). Il Messaggero di S. Antonio.
- Pięta, Zenon (2002). Hierarchia catholica medii et recentioris aevi (in Latin). Vol. 9 (1903–1922). Padua: Messagero di San Antonio. ISBN 978-88-250-1000-8.

=== Studies ===
- Avino, Vincenzio d' (1848). Cenni storici sulle chiese arcivescovili, vescovili, e prelatizie (nullius) del regno delle due Sicilie (in Italian). Naples: dalle stampe di Ranucci.
- Buchicchio, Massimo (2011). Reverendissimi in Christo Patres et Domini Cardinali commendatari de la abbazia de la Sanctissima Trinità et Episcopi de la città de La Cava. Cava de' Tirreni 2011.
- Cappelletti, Giuseppe (1870). Le chiese d'Italia dalla loro origine sino ai nostri giorni (in Italian). Vol. vigesimoprimo (21). Venezia: Antonelli.
- De Stefano, Silvano (1903). La badia della S.S. Trinità dei pp. benedettini in Cava de' Tirreni: guida storica illustrata (in Italian). Cava: Badia di Cava.
- Kehr, Paulus Fridolin (1935). Italia pontificia. Regesta pontificum Romanorum. Vol. VIII: Regnum Normannorum — Campania. Berlin: Weidmann.
- Milano, Salvatore (2014). La Cattedrale di Santa Maria della Visitazione in Cava de' Tirreni (in Italian). Angri (SA): Editrice Gaia. ISBN 978-88-97741-40-4.
- Ughelli, Ferdinando; Coleti, Niccolò (1717). Italia sacra, sive De episcopis Italiæ, et insularum adjacentium (in Latin). Vol. Tomus primus (editio altera ed.). apud Sebastianum Coleti. pp. 607–619.

==== External links ====
- GCatholic diocese of Cava, with links to individual bishops' CVs
