= Amalfi =

Town in Campania, Italy

- Comune
- Comune di Amalfi
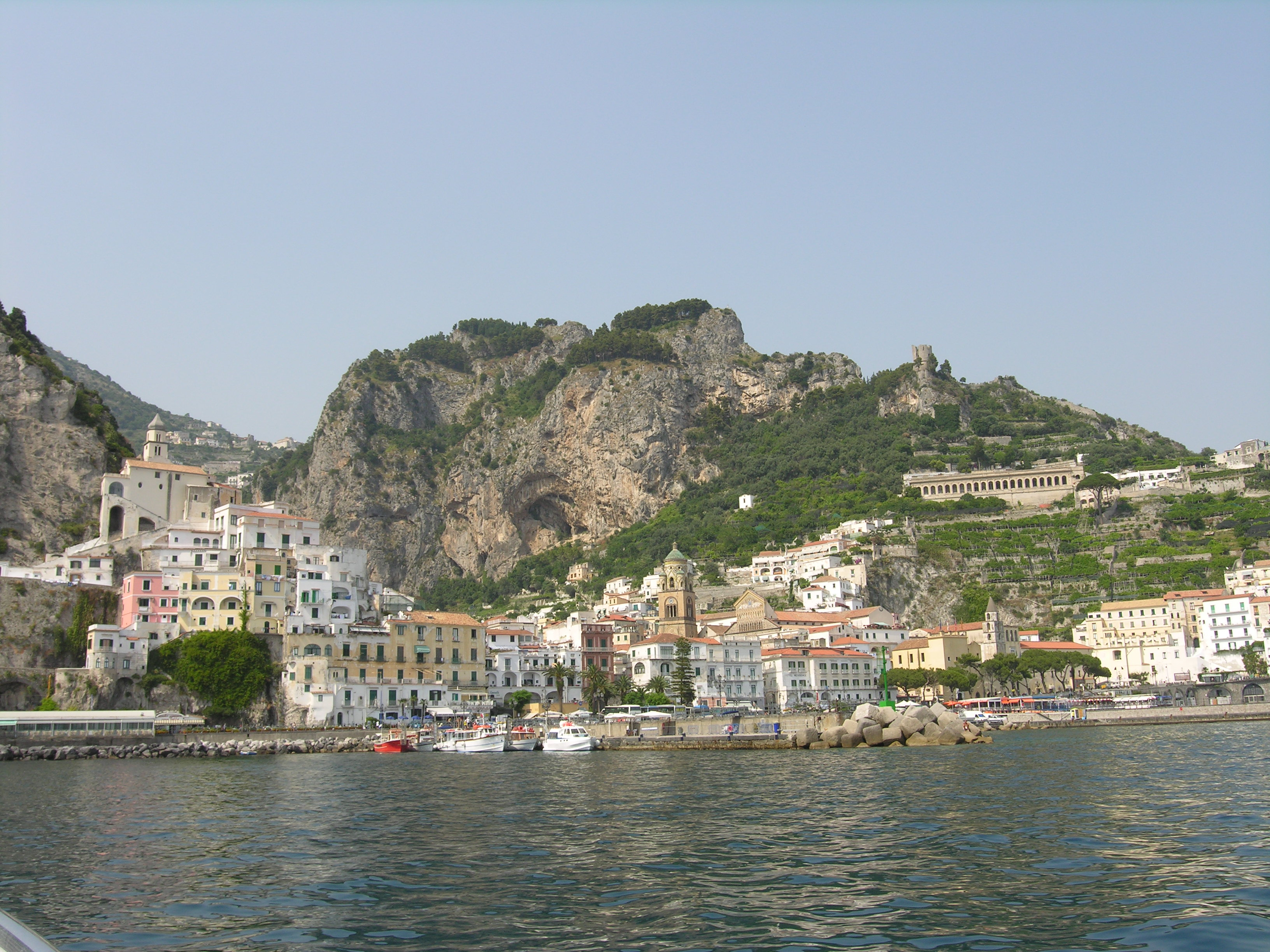
- View of Amalfi from the sea

- Flag Coat of arms

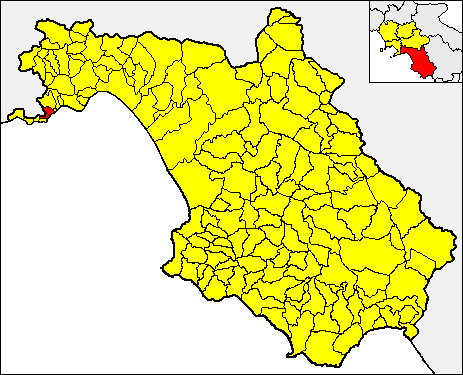
- Amalfi within the Province of Salerno

- Location within Italy Location within Campania
- Country: Italy
- Region: Campania
- Province: Salerno (SA)
- Frazioni: Lone, Pastena, Pogerola, Tovere, Vettica

Government
  - Mayor: Daniele Milano

Area
  - Total: 5.7 km^{2} (2.2 sq mi)
- Elevation: 6 m (20 ft)

Population (2025)
  - Total: 4,611
  - Density: 810/km^{2} (2,100/sq mi)
- Demonym: Amalfitani
- Time zone: UTC+1 (CET)
  - Summer (DST): UTC+2 (CEST)
- Postal code: 84011
- Dialing code: 089
- ISTAT code: 065006
- Patron saint: Saint Andrew
- Saint day: 30 November
- Website: Official website

UNESCO World Heritage Site
- Part of: Costiera Amalfitana
- Criteria: Cultural: (ii)(iv)
- Reference: 830
- Inscription: 1997 (21st Session)
- Area: 11,206 ha (27,690 acres)
- Buffer zone: 11,857 ha (29,300 acres)

Amalfi (UK: /əˈmælfi/, US: /ɑːˈmɑːlfi/, Italian: [aˈmalfi]) is a town and comune in the province of Salerno, in the region of Campania, Italy, on the Gulf of Salerno. It lies at the mouth of a deep ravine, at the foot of Monte Cerreto (1,315 metres, 4,314 feet), surrounded by dramatic cliffs and coastal scenery. The town of Amalfi was the capital of the maritime republic known as the Duchy of Amalfi, an important trading power in the Mediterranean between 839 and around 1200. It has 4,611 inhabitants.

The town became a popular seaside resort beginning in the Edwardian era, with members of the British upper class spending their winters in Amalfi. Amalfi is included in the UNESCO World Heritage Sites.

== History ==
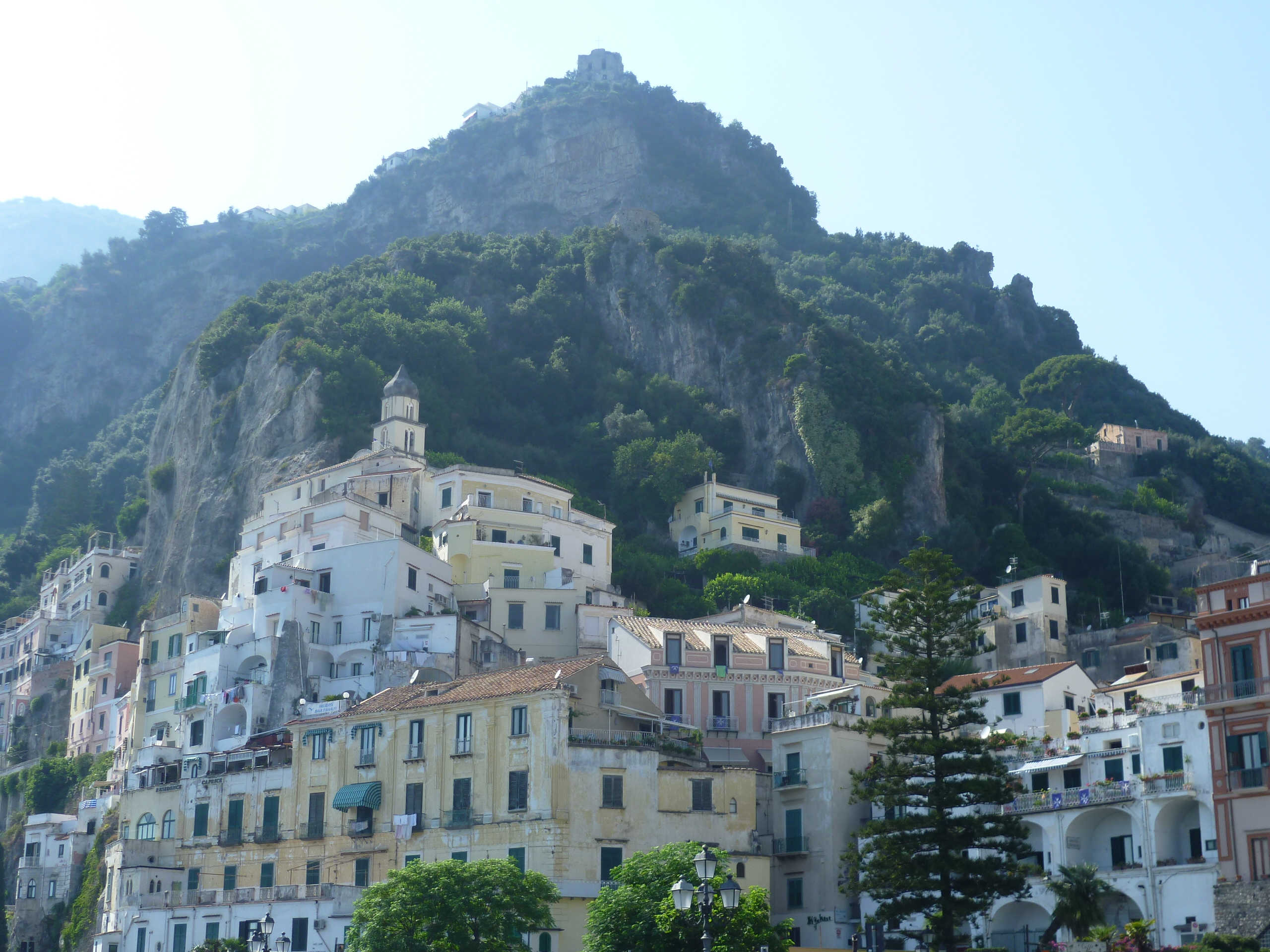
View of Amalfi.

Amalfi began as a maritime power, trading grain from its neighbours, salt from Sardinia and slaves from the interior, and even timber, in exchange for the gold dinars minted in Egypt and Syria, in order to buy the Byzantine silks that it resold in the West. Grain-bearing Amalfi traders enjoyed privileged positions in the Islamic ports, Fernand Braudel notes. The Amalfi tables provided a maritime code that was widely used by the Christian port cities. Merchants of Amalfi were using gold coins to purchase land in the 9th century, while most of Italy worked in a barter economy. During the late 9th century, long-distance trade revived between Amalfi and Gaeta with Byzantium, the latter which benefited from a flourishing trade network with the Arabs. Karl Marx in "The German Ideology" acknowledged the role of Amalfi in the very beginning of European mercantile capitalism.

An independent republic from the 7th century until 1073, Amalfi extracted itself from Byzantine vassalage in 839 and first elected a duke in 958; it rivalled Pisa and Genoa in its domestic prosperity and maritime importance before the rise of the Republic of Venice. In spite of some devastating setbacks it had a population of some 70,000 to 80,000 reaching a peak about the turn of the millennium, during the reign of Duke Manso (966–1004). Under his line of dukes, Amalfi remained independent, except for a brief period of Salernitan dependency under Guaimar IV.

In 1073, the republic fell to the Norman countship of Apulia, but was granted many rights. A prey to the Normans who encamped in the south of Italy, it became one of their principal posts. However, in 1131, it was reduced by Roger II of Sicily, who had been refused the keys to its citadel. The Holy Roman Emperor Lothair, fighting in favour of Pope Innocent II against Roger, who sided with the Antipope Anacletus, took him prisoner in 1133, assisted by forty-six Pisan ships. The Pisans, commercial rivals of the Amalfitani, sacked the city; Lothair claimed as part of the booty a copy of the Pandects of Justinian which was found there.

In 1135 and 1137, it was taken by the Pisans and rapidly declined in importance, though the Amalfian Laws were recognized in the Mediterranean until 1570. A tsunami in 1343 destroyed the port and lower town, and Amalfi never recovered to anything more than local importance.

In medieval culture Amalfi was famous for its flourishing schools of law and mathematics. Flavio Gioia, traditionally considered the first to introduce the mariner's compass to Europe, is said to have been a native of Amalfi.

Amalfi has a long history of catering to visitors, with two former monasteries being converted to hotels at a relatively early date, the Luna Convento in the second decade of the 19th century and the Cappuccini Convento in the 1880s. Celebrated visitors to Amalfi included the composer Richard Wagner and the playwright Henrik Ibsen, both of whom completed works while staying in Amalfi.

== Demographics ==
Historical population

Year	Pop.	±%
1861	6,952	—
1871	7,169	+3.1%
1881	7,737	+7.9%
1901	7,308	−5.5%
1911	7,472	+2.2%
1921	7,300	−2.3%
1931	6,497	−11.0%
1936	6,063	−6.7%

Year	Pop.	±%
1951	6,237	+2.9%
1961	7,163	+14.8%
1971	6,258	−12.6%
1981	6,055	−3.2%
1991	5,589	−7.7%
2001	5,428	−2.9%
2011	5,163	−4.9%
2021	4,830	−6.4%

Source: ISTAT

== Main sights ==
Amalfi occupied a high position in medieval architecture; its cathedral of Sant'Andrea (Saint Andrew, 11th century), the campanile, the convent of the Cappuccini, founded by the Amalfitan Cardinal Pietro Capuano, richly represent the artistic movement prevailing in Southern Italy at the time of the Normans, with its tendency to blend the Byzantine style with the forms and sharp lines of the northern architecture.

=== Cathedral ===
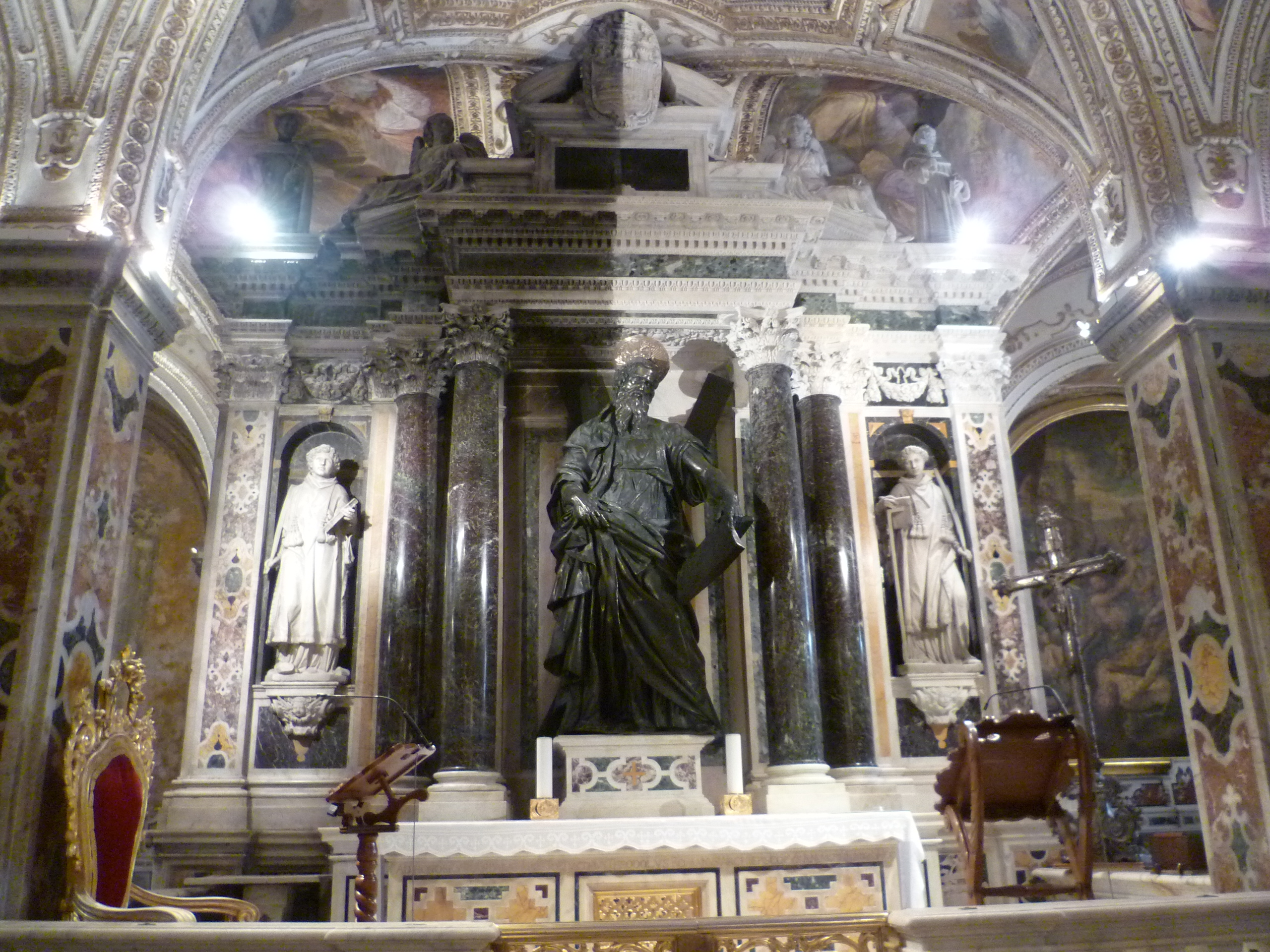
Shrine of Saint Andrew.

At the top of a flight of steps, Saint Andrew's Cathedral (Duomo) overlooks the Piazza Duomo, the heart of Amalfi. The cathedral dates back to the 11th century; its interior is adorned in the late Baroque style with a nave and two aisles divided by 20 columns. The façade of the cathedral is Byzantine in style and is adorned with various paintings of saints, including a large fresco of Saint Andrew.

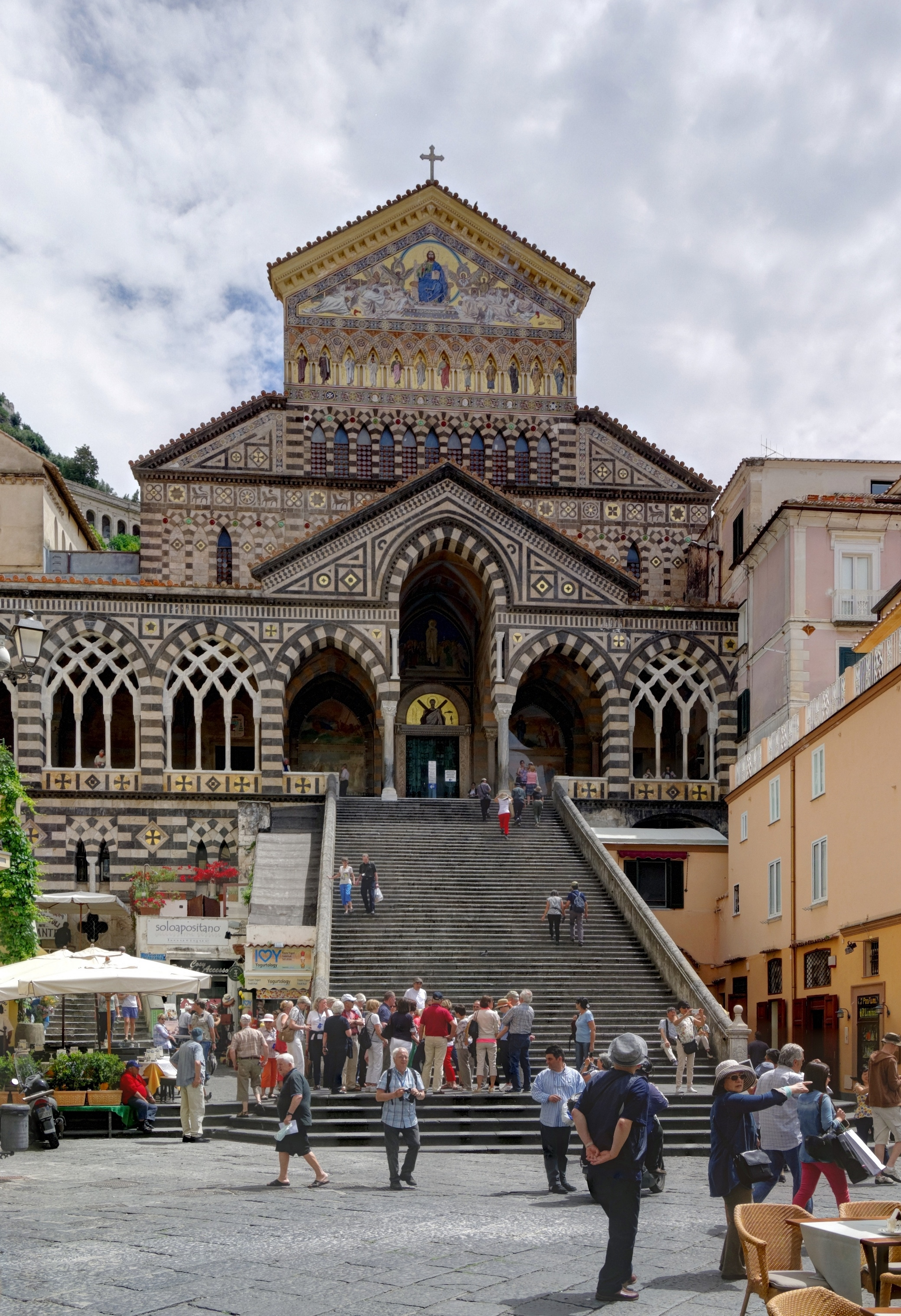
Duomo di Amalfi and the piazza.

The gold caisson ceiling has four large paintings by Andrea dell'Asta. They depict the flagellation of Saint Andrew, the miracle of Manna, the crucifixion of Saint Andrew and the Saint on the cross. From the left hand nave there is a flight of stairs which leads to the crypt. These stairs were built in 1203 for Cardinal Pietro Capuano, who, on 18 May 1208, brought Saint Andrew's remains to the cathedral from Constantinople.

The bronze statue of Saint Andrew in the cathedral was sculpted by Michelangelo Naccherino, a pupil of Michelangelo; also present are Pietro Bernini marble sculptures of St. Stephen and St. Lawrence.

In 1206, Saint Andrew's relics were brought to Amalfi from Constantinople by the Pietro Capuano following the Sack of Constantinople (an event of the 4th Crusade) after the completion of the town's cathedral. The cathedral contains a tomb in its crypt that it maintains still holds a portion of the relics of the apostle. A golden reliquary which originally housed his skull and another one used for processions through Amalfi on holy days can also be seen.

=== Arsenal of the Maritime Republic (Gli Arsenali della Repubblica) ===
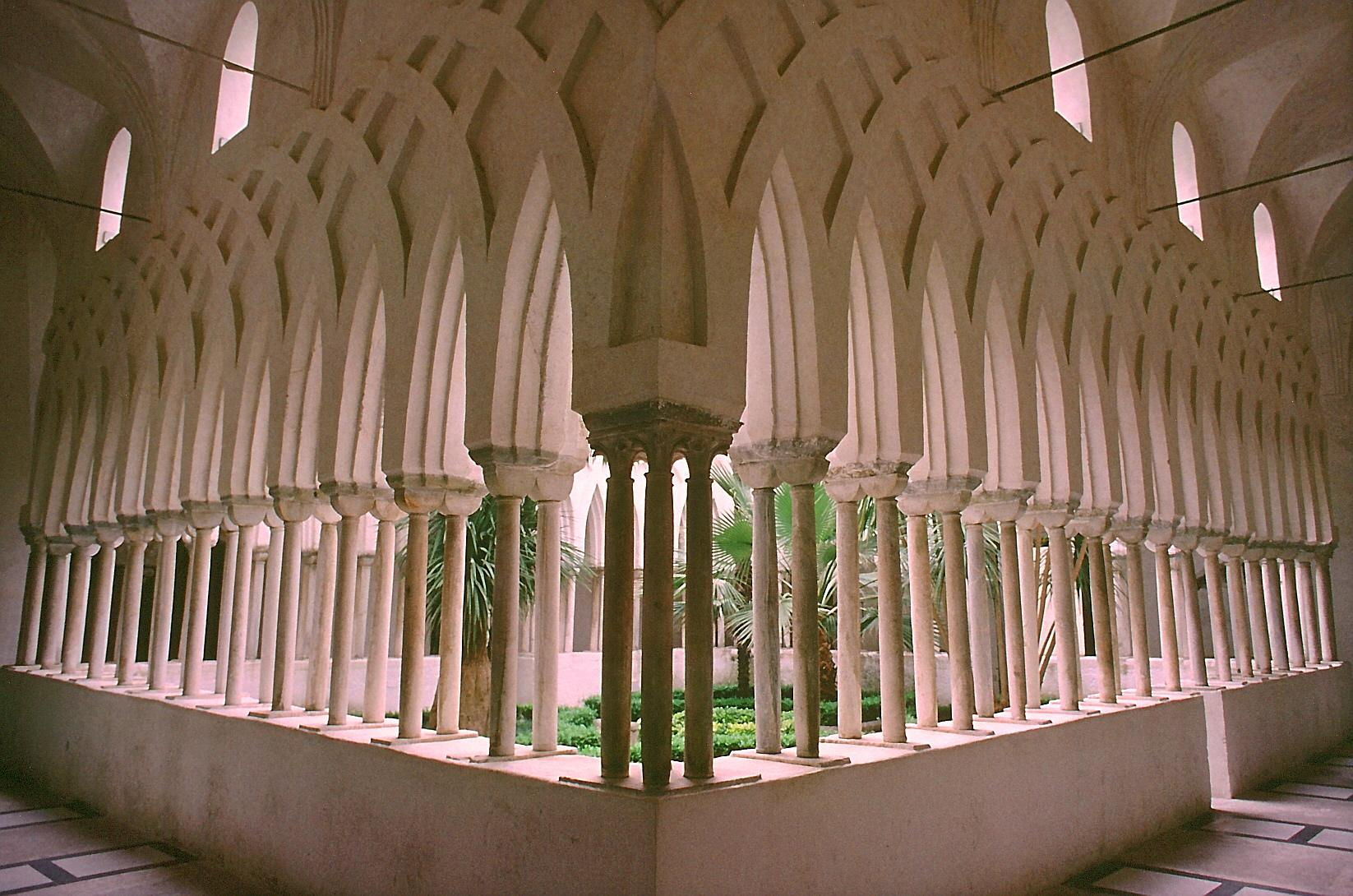
The Chiostro del Paradiso.

The structure of the arsenal consists of two large stone-built halls with vaulting supported by repeated pointed arches. The vaulting rests on ten piers, originally there were twenty two, the missing twelve and the structure they supported having been lost to centuries of coastal erosion. The main function of the arsenal was the building, repair and storage of warships. Amalfitan war-galleys were among the largest to be found in the Mediterranean during the Early Middle Ages. The building now contains architectural and sculptural remains, a row-barge used in the Historical Regatta, a number of models of ships and it also acts as a venue for visual art exhibitions. Starting from December 2010, the Ancient Arsenals of Amalfi host the Compass Museum on the premises of the two aisles of the building, which were spared by the Amalfi seaquake of 1343.

=== Museum of Handmade Paper (Museo della Carta) ===
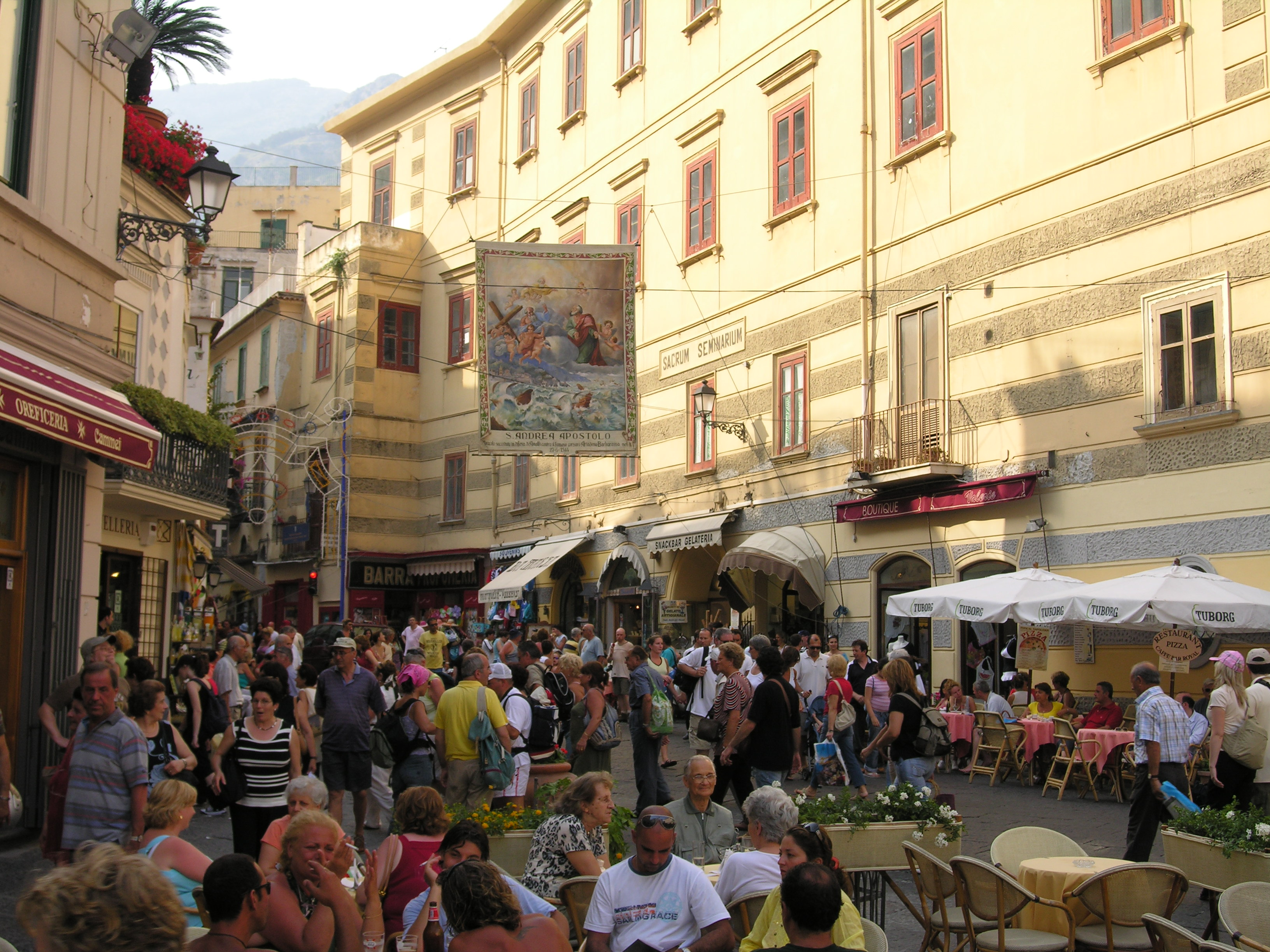
View of Piazza del Duomo.

The Museum of Handmade Paper, located in Mill Valley in the northern part of the modern town, celebrates the long-established paper making tradition in Amalfi. The town was one of the first centres of paper making in Europe, the skill having been acquired by the Amalfitans from the Arabs. The museum is housed in an ancient paper mill which was once owned by the Milano family, a family famous in Amalfi for its involvement in the production and manufacture of paper. In 1969 the building was converted into a museum as a result of the will of Nicholas Milano, the mill's then owner. The museum contains the machinery and equipment (restored and fully functional) that was once used to manufacture paper by hand.

== Culture ==
The Amalfi coast is famed for its production of Limoncello liqueur and the area is a known cultivator of lemons. The correct name is "sfusato amalfitano", and they are typically long and at least double the size of other lemons, with a thick and wrinkled skin and a sweet and juicy flesh without many pips. It is common to see lemons growing in the terraced gardens along the entire Amalfi coast between February and October. Amalfi is also a known maker of a hand-made thick paper which is called "bambagina". It is exported to many European countries and to America and has been used throughout Italy for wedding invitations, visiting cards and elegant writing paper. The paper has a high quality and has been used by artists such as Giuseppe Leone, who described it: "There is a whole world that the Amalfi paper evokes and an artist who is sensitive to the suggestion of these places is aware that it is unique and exciting".

Three traditional events draw numerous visitors to Amalfi. First are the feast days of Saint Andrew (25–27 June, and 30 November), celebrating the city's patron saint. Then there is "Byzantine New Year's Eve" (31 August) celebrating the beginning of the New Year according to the old civil calendar of the Byzantine Empire. The third event is the Historical Regatta (first Sunday in June), a traditional rowing competition among the four best known Italian historical maritime republics: Amalfi, Genoa, Pisa, and Venice. This event is hosted by a different city every year, so it comes to Amalfi once every four years.

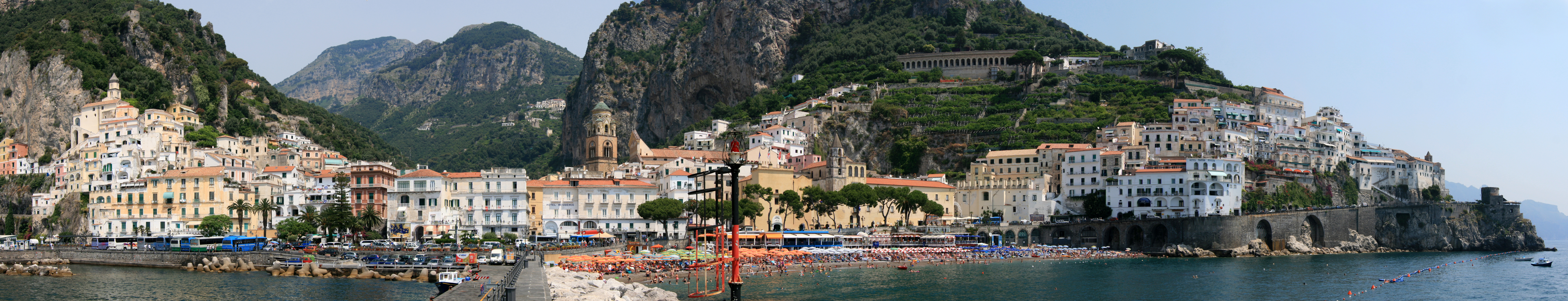
Panoramic view of the town of Amalfi, with the Amalfi Cathedral in the centre

== Transportation ==
Amalfi can be reached using the SS163 Amalfitana state road, the SR366 regional road and the SP252 provincial road.

The port of Amalfi has passenger connections to Capri, Positano, Maiori, Minori, Cetara, and Salerno.

The nearest airports are:

- Salerno-Pontecagnano Airport (QSR) 45 km
- Napoli-Capodichino (NAP) 74 km

== See also ==
- Amalfi Coast
- Archdiocese of Amalfi
- Diocesan Museum of Amalfi
- Duchy of Amalfi
- The Duchess of Malfi, a play by John Webster set in the court of Amalfi in the early 16th century
- Italian armored cruiser Amalfi
- Muristan, founded by an Amalfitan merchant
- Salerno Costa d'Amalfi Airport
- Sorrentine Peninsula
