= Amalfi Cathedral =

Cathedral in Italy

Coordinates: 40°38′04″N 14°36′11″E

- Duomo di Amalfi; Cattedrale di Sant'Andrea
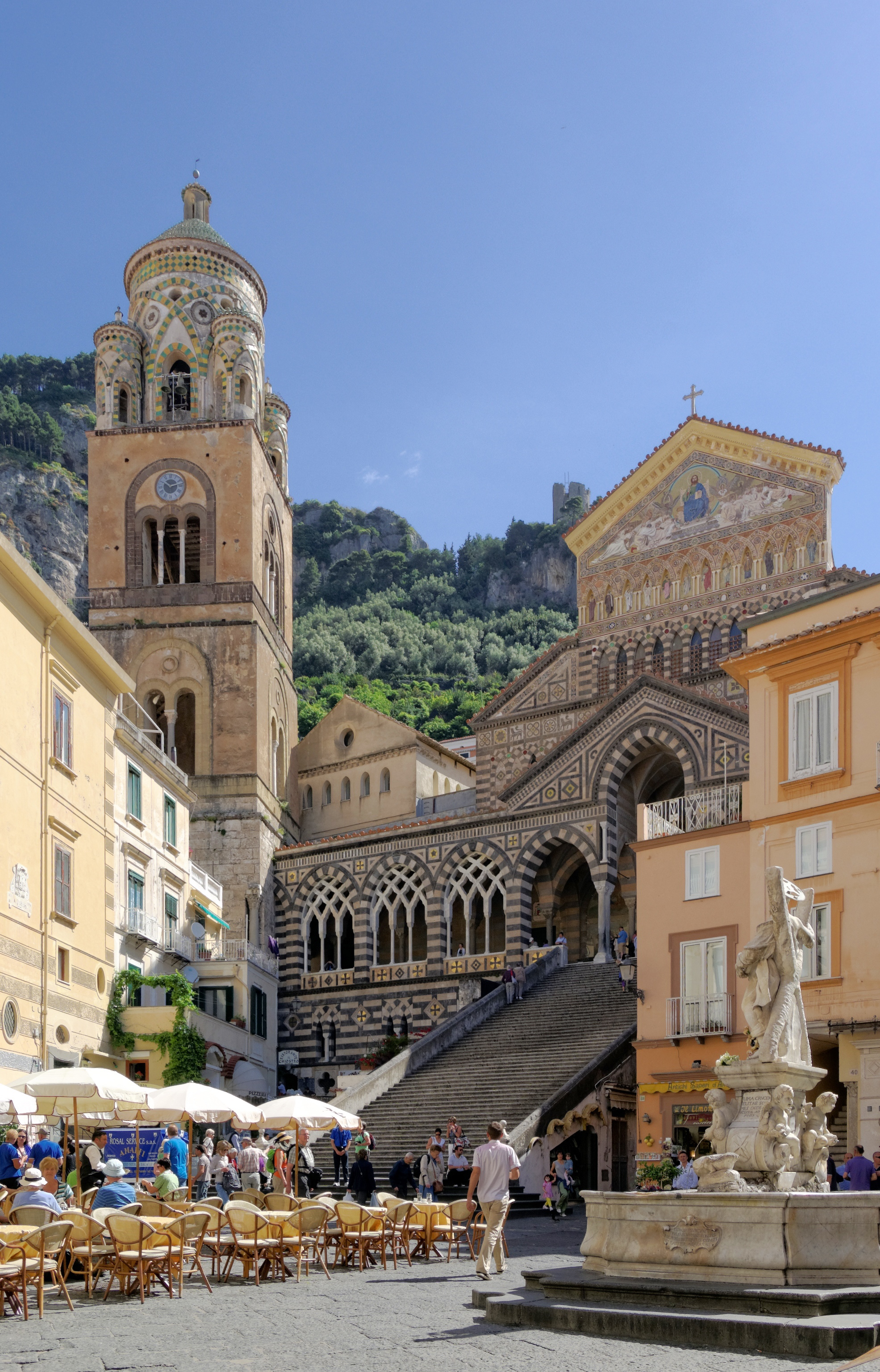
- View of the cathedral and the steps leading to it from the Piazza del Duomo.

Religion
- Affiliation: Roman Catholic
- Ecclesiastical or organizational status: Cathedral

Location
- Location: Piazza del Duomo, Amalfi, Italy
- Interactive map of Amalfi Cathedral

Architecture
- Style: Romanesque-Baroque-Rococo

Amalfi Cathedral (Italian: Duomo di Amalfi; Cattedrale di Sant'Andrea) is a medieval Roman Catholic cathedral in the Piazza del Duomo, Amalfi, Italy. It is dedicated to the Apostle Saint Andrew whose relics are kept here. Formerly the archiepiscopal seat of the Diocese of Amalfi, it has been since 1986 that of the Diocese of Amalfi-Cava de' Tirreni.

Begun in the 9th and 10th centuries, it has been added to and redecorated several times, overlaying Arab-Norman, Gothic, Renaissance, Baroque elements, and finally a new 19th century Norman-Arab-Byzantine facade. The cathedral includes the adjoining 9th-century Basilica of the Crucifix. Leading from the basilica are steps into the Crypt of St. Andrew, where his relics can be found. Local catholic mythos and legends claim that a gelatinous liquid that drips from the area in the crypt where Saint Andrew's relics are kept is an "oil of the saints" called "manna" this manna is collected in a glass during celebrations twice a year.

== History ==
Location of Amalfi Cathedral

The first church, now the Diocesan Museum of Amalfi, was built in the 9th century on the ruins of a previous temple. A second church was built to the south in 10th century, and this is now the cathedral. By the 12th century the two churches formed a single 6 aisle Romanesque church, which was reduced to 5 in the 13th century to allow the construction of the Paradise Cloister, in the Arab-Norman style.

The remains of St. Andrew were reportedly brought to Amalfi from Constantinople in 1206 during the Fourth Crusade by Cardinal Peter of Capua. In 1208, the crypt was completed and the relics were turned over to the church. It said that later on manna issued from the saint's bones.

The bell tower was constructed between the 12th and 13th centuries in front of the first church, topped by an elaborate crown decorated with marble and majolica in the Arab-Norman style, also seen in other churches in southern Italy in this period. The chapels inside are variously Gothic and Renaissance, with the nave decorated in the Baroque style in the 18th century.

In 1861, part of the facade collapsed, damaging the atrium. The whole front of the church was then rebuilt to a design by architect Errico Alvino in a richly decorated manner drawing on Italian Gothic and especially Arab-Norman styles, similar to but more ornate than the original, completed in 1891.

== Architecture and fittings ==
=== Exterior ===
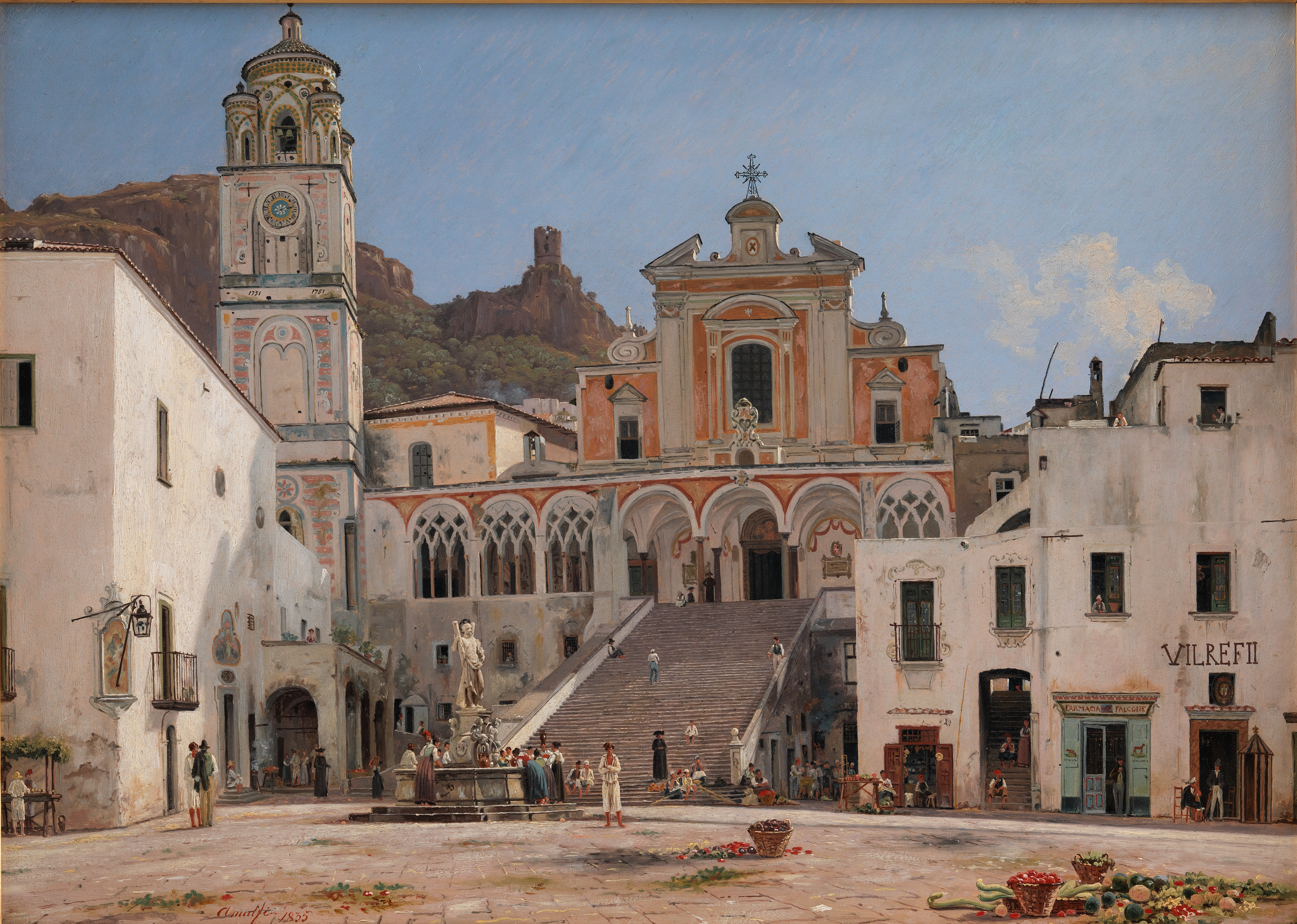
Painting by Martinus Rørbye showing the facade in 1835

The front facade was rebuilt in the late 19th century in striped marble and stone, with a tall pediment decorated with mosaics, and a deep porch with windows of delicate Arab-Moorish tracery similar to, but more ornate than, the original. The tympanum's mosaics portray "The triumph of Christ" in a work created by Domenico Morelli and whose original designs are retained in the Town Hall.

Sixty-two steps, wide and steep, lead up to the doors. Cast in Constantinople before 1066, and signed by Simeon of Syria, the cathedral's bronze doors are the earliest in Italy of post-Roman manufacture. Begun in 1180, and completed over 100 years later, the Romanesque style bell tower is topped by a cluster of four small towers around a larger one, all decorated with brightly coloured majolica tiles forming interlaced Gothic arches in an Arab-Norman style. This is the most ornate example of type of medieval bell tower found only in southern Italy. During times of war, the bell tower was purposed for defense.

The garden contains colonnades, arches, and sculptures.

=== Interior ===
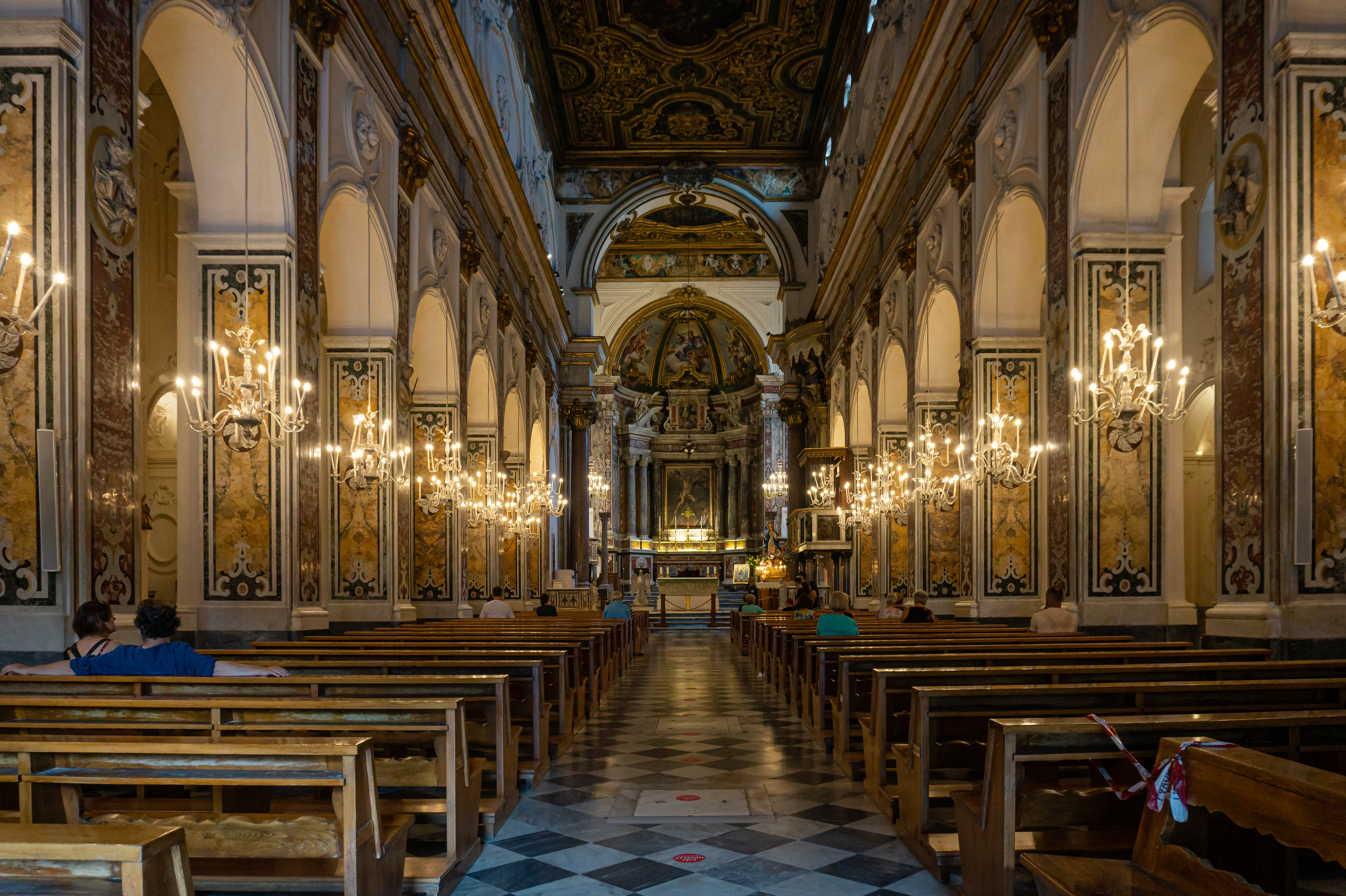
The cathedral's central nave seen from the entrance

A wooden 13th century Crucifix hangs in the liturgical area. Another crucifix, made of mother-of-pearl, was brought from the Holy Land and is located to the right of the back door.

The high altar in the central nave is formed from the sarcophagus of the Peter of Capua (died 1214). Above the altar is a painting by Andrea dell'Asta of The Martyrdom of St. Andrew. The boxed ceiling dates to 1702 and its artwork includes the Flagellation, the Crucifixion of the Apostle, and the Dell'Asta's 1710 Miracle of the Manna. The triumphal arch is held up by two Egyptian granite columns. There are two additional twisted columns and two pulpits that were part of the 12th century ambo. One of the pillars boasts a hidden column as an example of the ancient Romanesque structure.

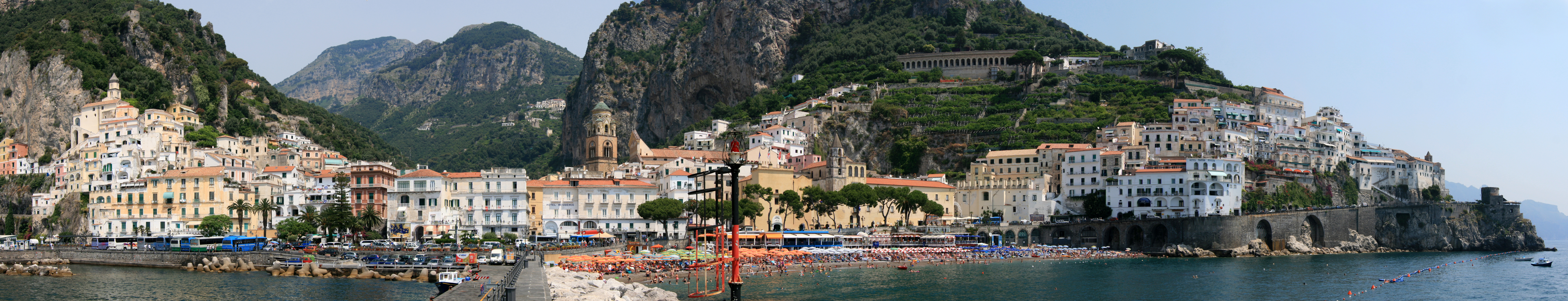
Panoramic view of the town of Amalfi, with the Amalfi Cathedral in the center

== Gallery ==
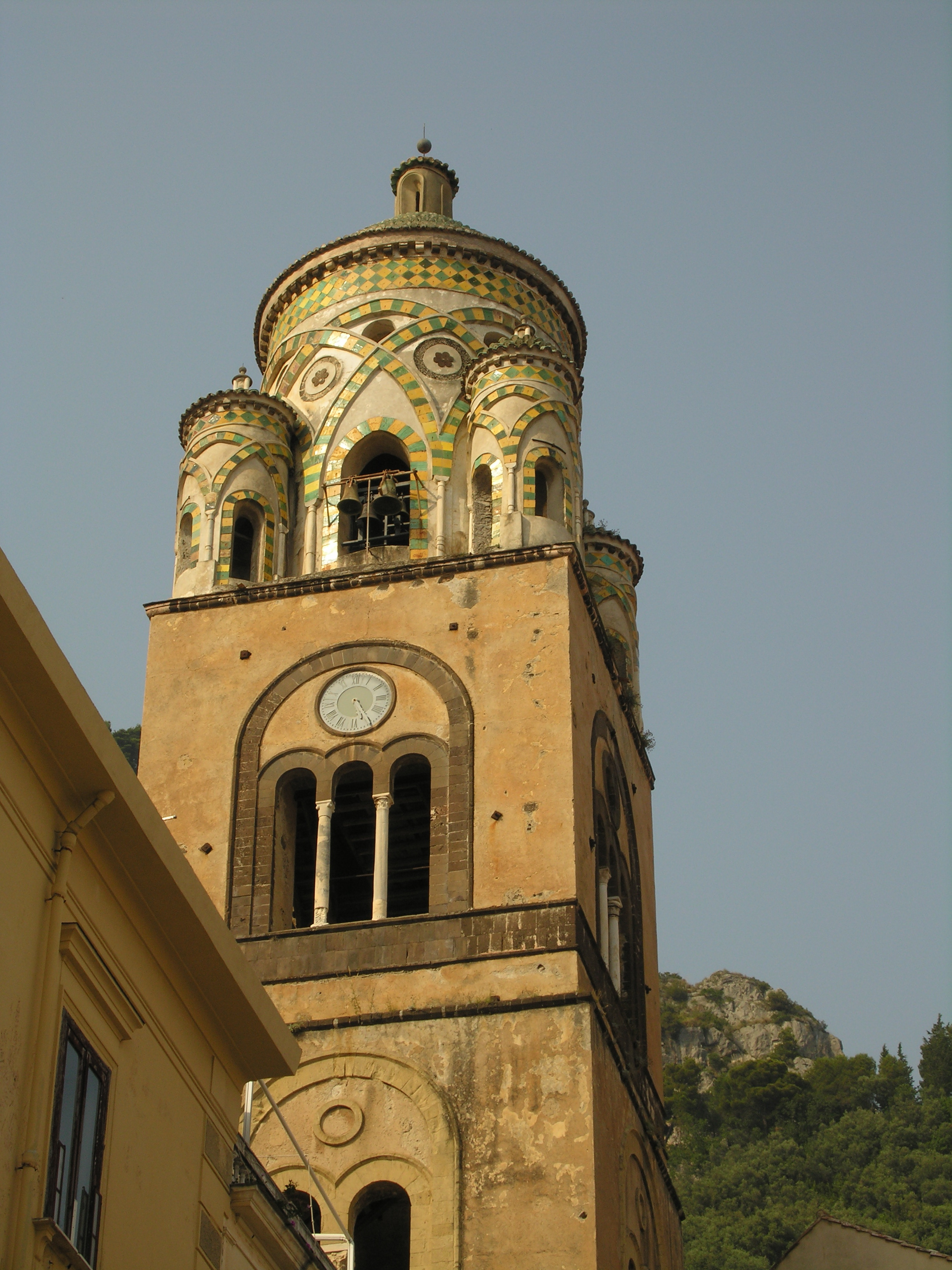
The bell tower of the cathedral

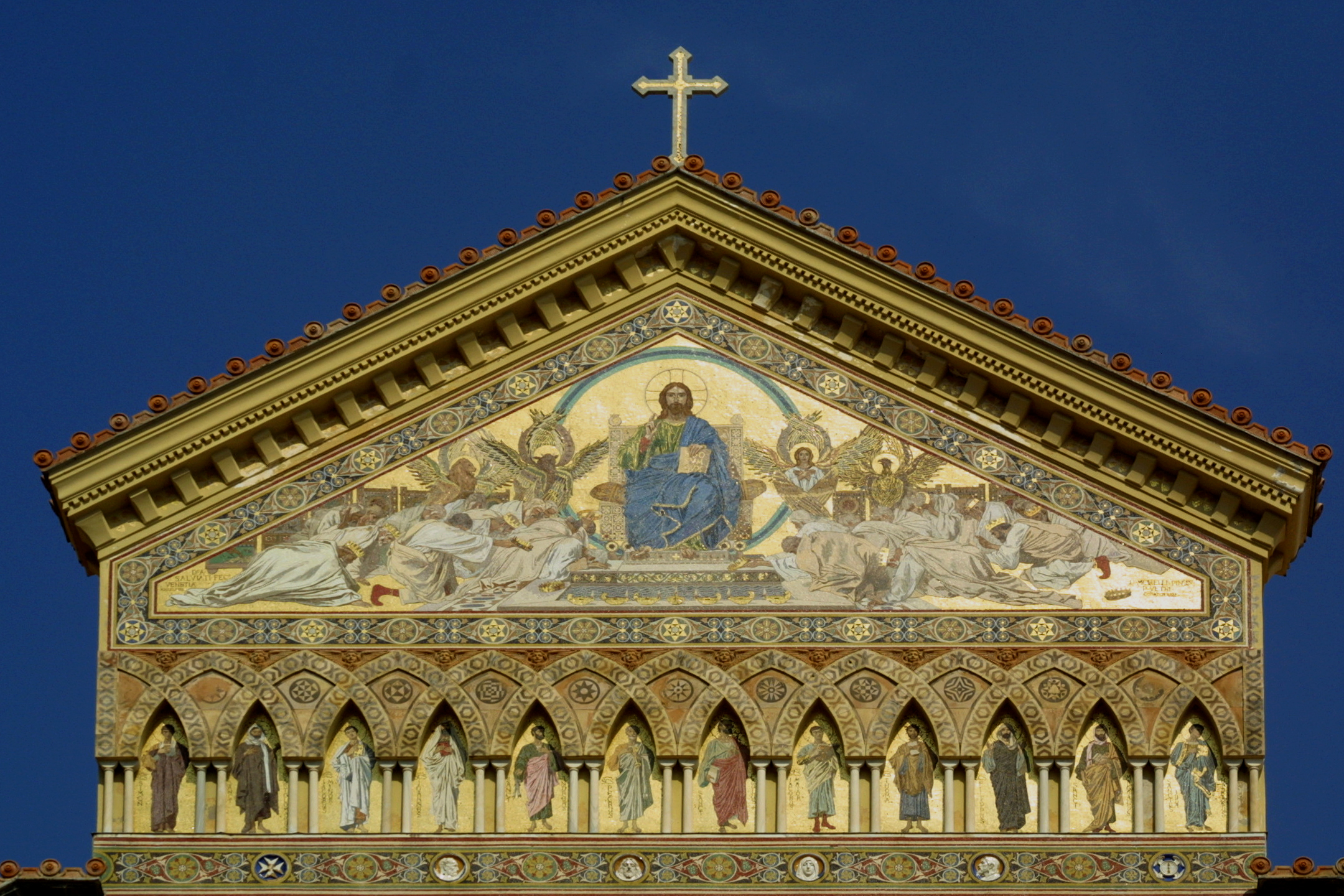
Amalfi Cathedral mosaic

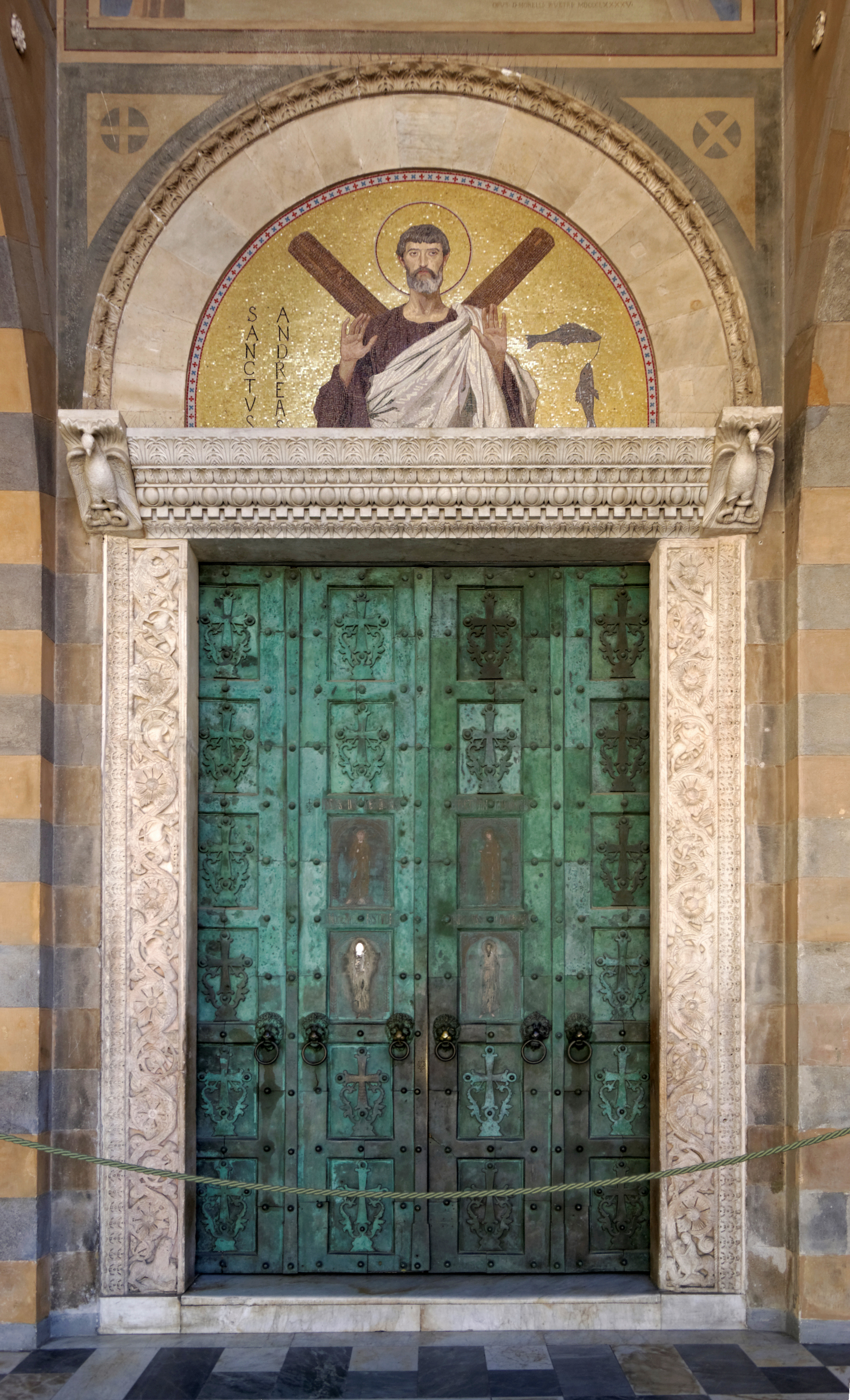
Bronze portal of the cathedral

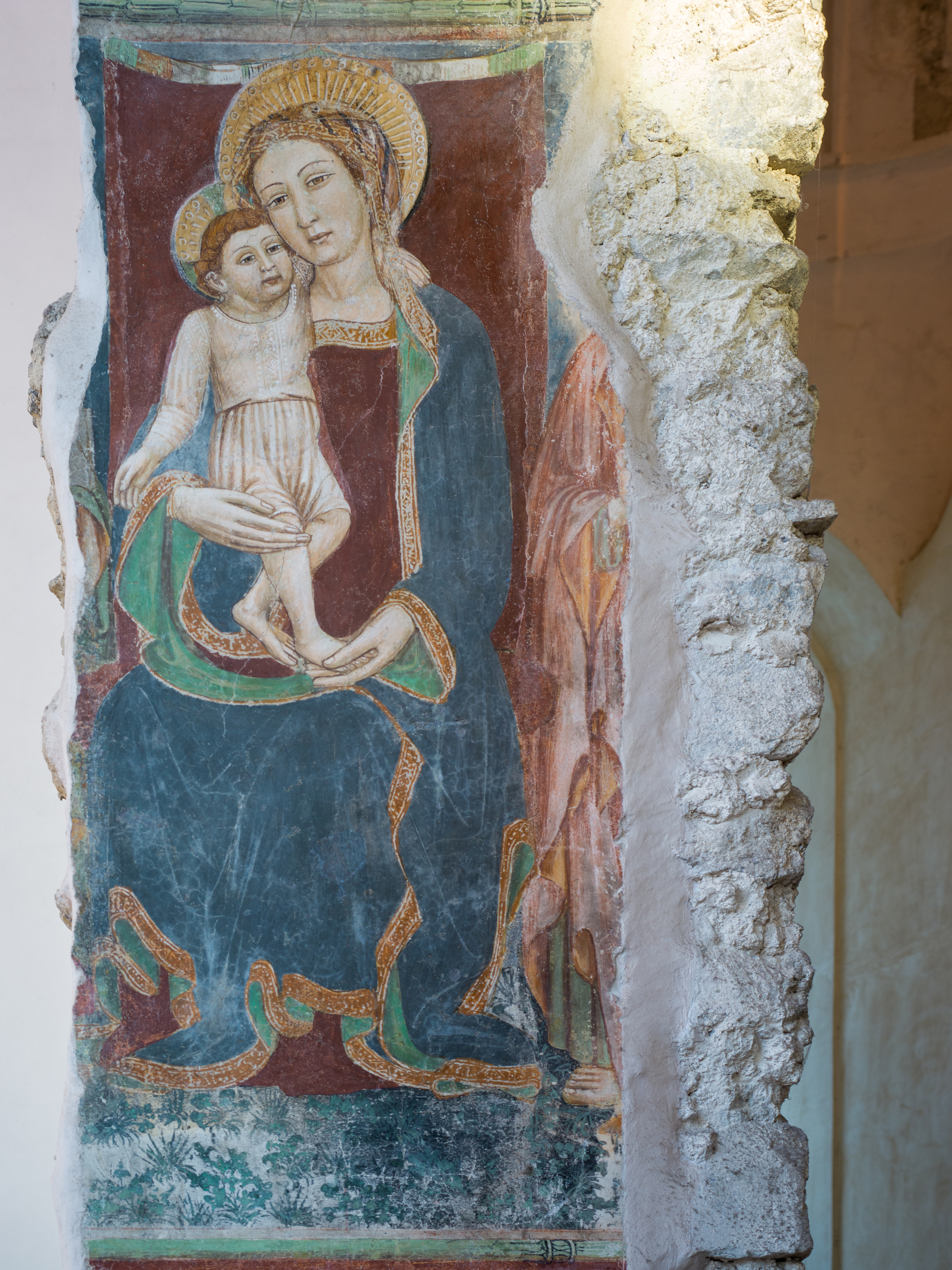
Fresco of Madonna ca. 14th century AD

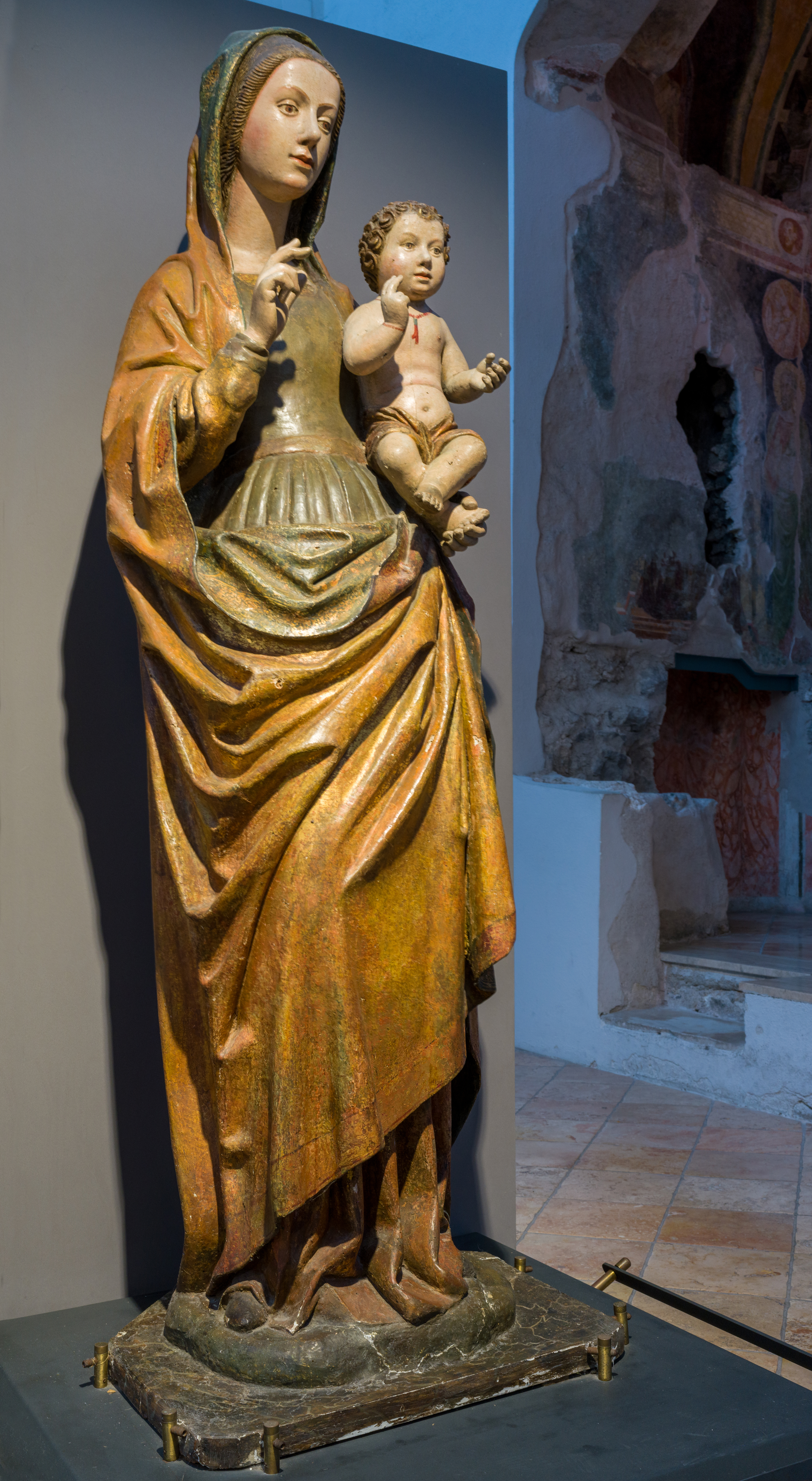
Madonna with Child ca. 15th century AD

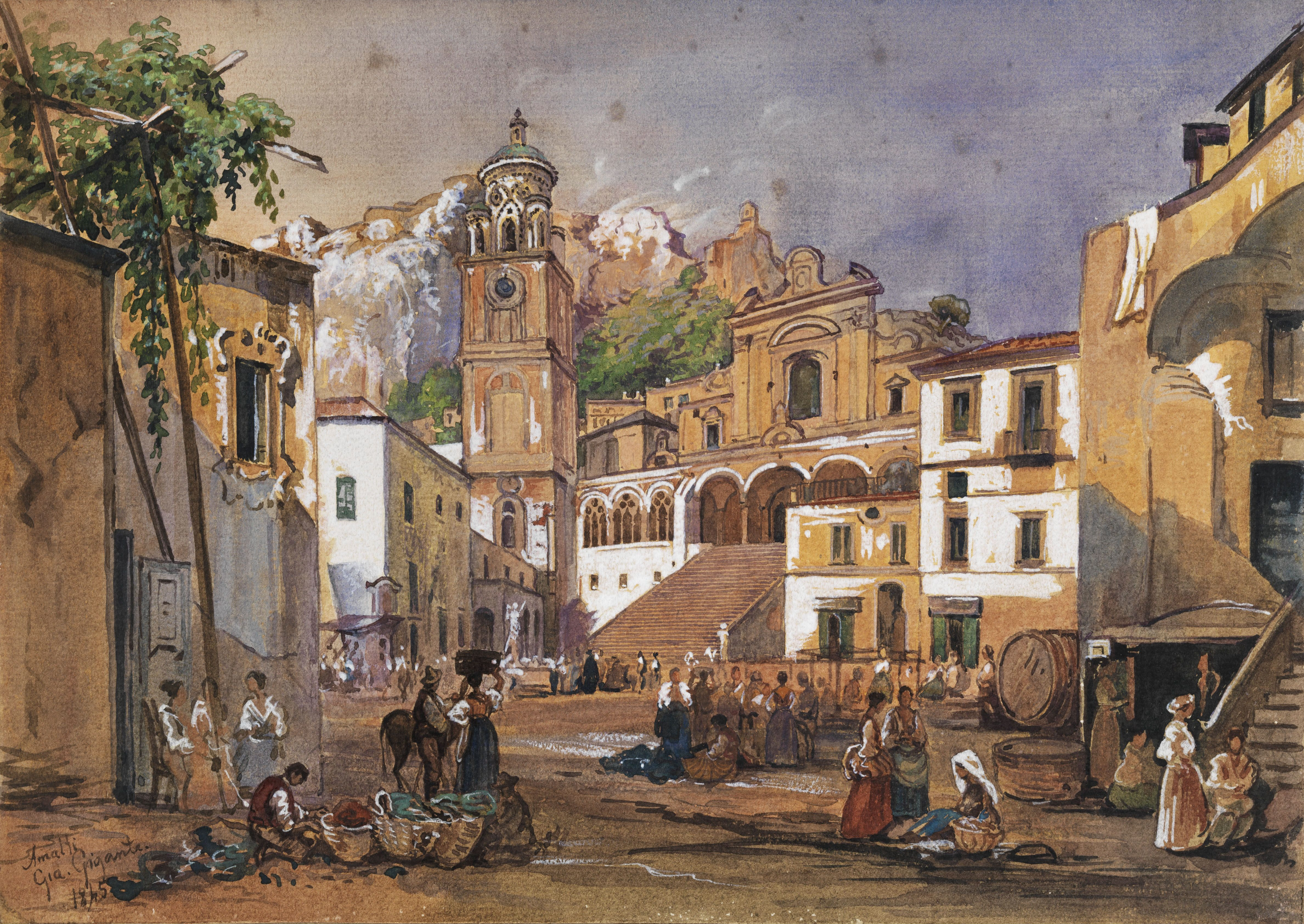
Painting of 1845 by Giacinto Gigante
