= Archdiocese of Amalfi-Cava de' Tirreni =

Roman Catholic archdiocese in Italy

Coordinates: 40.6333°N 14.6000°E

Archdiocese of Amalfi-Cava de' Tirreni Archidioecesis Amalphitana-Cavensis

Catholic
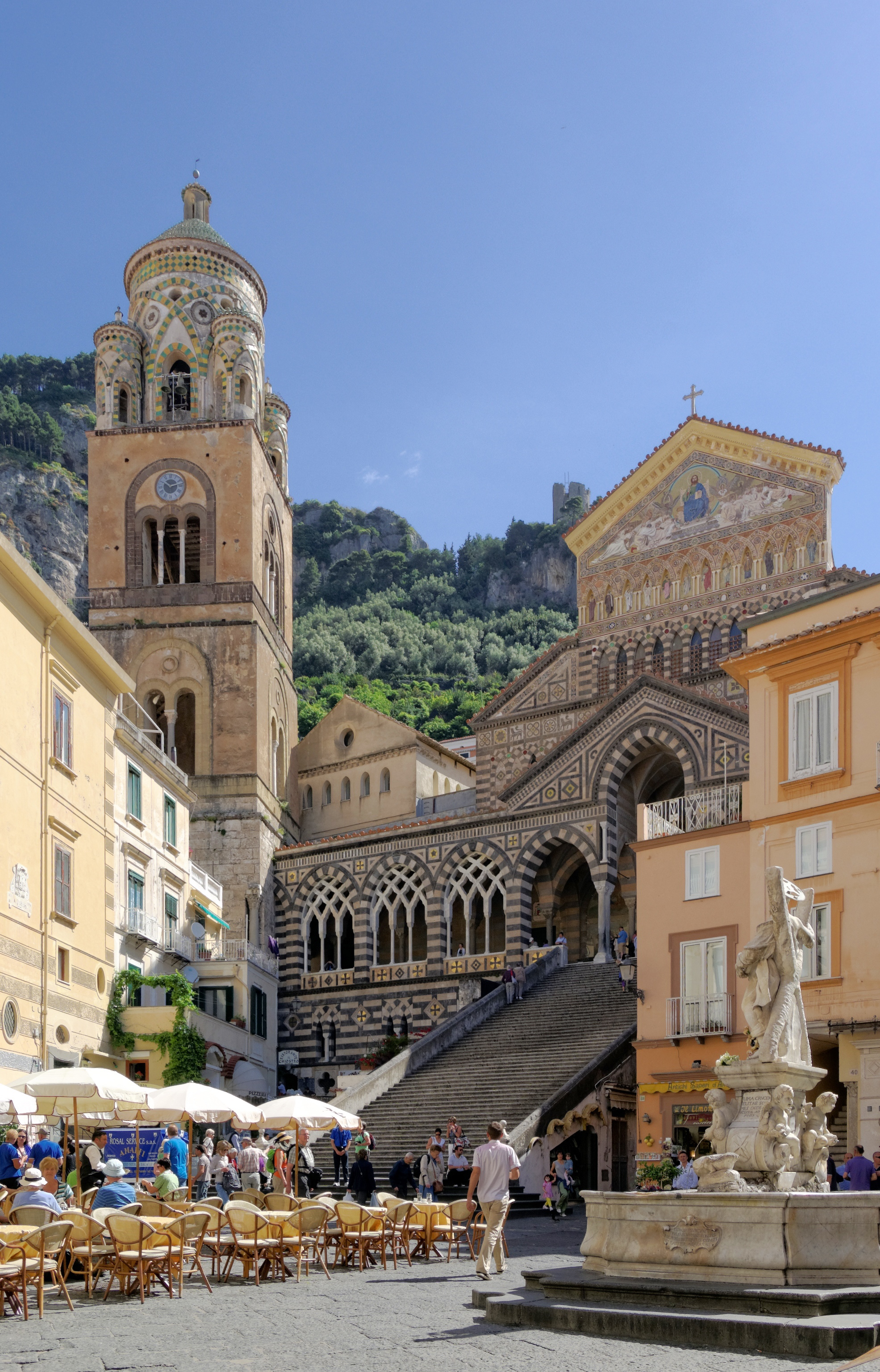
- Façade of the Duomo of Amalfi

Location
- Country: Italy
- Ecclesiastical province: Salerno-Campagna-Acerno

Statistics
- Area: 150 km^{2} (58 sq mi)
- Population: Total; Catholics: (as of 2023); 100,500 (est.) ▼; 100,100 (est.) ▼
- Parishes: 77 ▼

Information
- Denomination: Catholic Church
- Rite: Roman Rite
- Established: 6th Century
- Cathedral: Cattedrale di S. Andrea Apostolo
- Secular priests: 69 (diocesan) ▲27 (Religious Orders) ▼16 Permanent Deacons

Current leadership
- Pope: Leo XIV
- Archbishop: Orazio Soricelli

Website
- www.diocesiamalficava.it

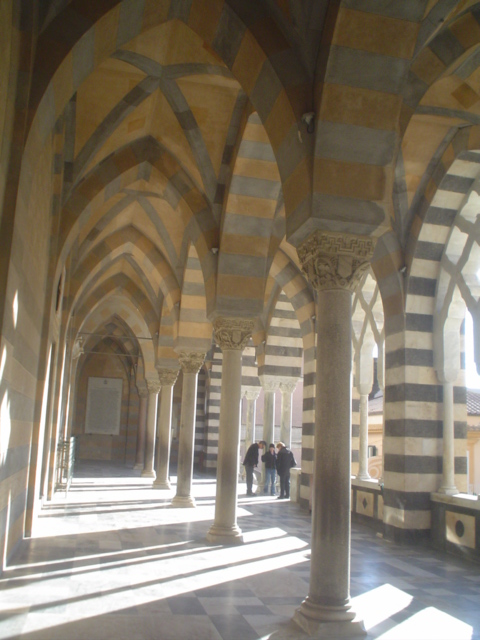
Cloisters in the Duomo of Amalfi.

The Archdiocese of Amalfi-Cava de' Tirreni (Latin: Archidioecesis Amalphitana-Cavensis) is an archdiocese of the Latin Church of the Catholic Church, with its episcopal see at Amalfi, southwest of Naples. It was named Archdiocese of Amalfi until parts of the Diocese of Cava e Sarno were merged with it on 30 September 1986.

It was exempt, i.e. directly dependent on the Holy See, but is now a suffragan of the Roman Catholic Archdiocese of Salerno-Campagna-Acerno.

The current bishop is Orazio Soricelli. In 2015, in the diocese of Amalfi there was one priest for every 1,199 Catholics.

== History ==
The early beginnings of the Diocese of Amalfi are obscure; it is not known when it was founded, or when Christianity reached it. That it was early is a reasonable conjecture, considering the facilities for communication with the East which the South of Italy possessed.

=== Bishopric ===
The first indication that Amalfi was a Christian community is supplied by Pope Gregory the Great, who wrote in January 596 to the Subdeacon Antemius, his legate and administrator in Campania, ordering him to constrain Primenus, Bishop of Amalfi, because he did not remain in his diocese but roamed about, to return to his see or face enclosure within a monastery. In 788, Pope Hadrian I informed Charlemagne of a plot concocted by the Lombard duke of Benevento, Arichis, to murder the legates of Charlemagne and join the Byzantine Empire. The plot also involved Bishop Stephen of Naples, the leaders of Salerno (which had recently been captured by Arichis), and people from Amalphi. Amalfi had earlier been attacked by Arichis, and had all the buildings outside the city walls destroyed.

The next bishop known by name is Petrus, who endured the sack of Amalfi by the Lombards in 829. In 838, Sicard, the successor of Arachis of Benevento, attacked and captured Amalfi; he deported many of the Amalfitans to Salerno.

In September 879, Pope John VIII wrote to the bishops of Naples and Amalfi and others, ordering them to abrogate the pact that they had entered into with the Saracens.

=== Archdiocese ===
It was raised to Metropolitan Archbishopric of Amalfi by Pope John XV in 987, having lost territory to establish the dioceses of Capri, of Lettere, of Minori and of Scala.

Archbishop Mauro De Monte (1103–1128) attended the Lateran council of Pope Paschal II at Easter 1112.

During the schism of 1130–1139, King Roger II of Sicily and the bishops of his kingdom supported Anacletus II, rather than the Emperor Lothar's Innocent II. Anacletus was pleased to grant Roger the title of King of Naples; Innocent refused to recognize it, and refused to confirm any bishops nominated by King Roger. Archbishop Giovanni della Porta was consecrated by Anacletus himself. After Anacletus died, Innocent summoned a general council, which met in the Lateran in 1139. Della Porta went, hoping no doubt for reconciliation, but Innocent instead provided retribution. King Roger and all the bishops who had been consecrated by Anacletus were excommunicated, and the bishops deposed.

In 1206, it gained territory from the suppressed diocese of Nocera de' Pagani. And after the completion, also in 1206, of the Cathedral of St. Andrew (Duomo), the relics of the Apostle of that name, who was the patron saint of Amalfi, were taken from Constantinople and brought there by Cardinal Pietro of Capua, an Amalfitan who took part in the sack of Constantinople during the Fourth Crusade.

On 10 October 1386, Amalfi lost territory when the diocese of Nocera was re-established by Urban VI.

=== Reorganization of 1818 ===
Following the extinction of the Napoleonic Kingdom of Italy, the Congress of Vienna authorized the restoration of the Papal States and the Kingdom of Naples. Since the French occupation had seen the abolition of many Church institutions in the kingdom, as well as the confiscation of most Church property and resources, it was imperative that Pope Pius VII and King Ferdinand IV reach agreement on restoration and restitution. Ferdinand, however, was not prepared to accept the pre-Napoleonic situation, in which Naples was a feudal subject of the papacy. Lengthy, detailed, and acrimonious negotiations ensued.

In 1818, a new concordat with the Kingdom of the Two Sicilies committed the pope to the suppression of more than fifty small dioceses in the kingdom. These were carried out in the papal bull "De Utiliore" of 27 June 1818. Amalfi lost its status as a metropolitan archdiocese and became merely the Archdiocese of Amalfi, even though it gained territories from the suppressed dioceses of Minori and of Ravello and Scala.

In the early 20th century, the archdiocese had about 36,000 inhabitants, 54 parishes and 279 diocesan priests.

=== Diocesan reorganization of 1986 ===
The Second Vatican Council (1962–1965), in order to ensure that all Catholics received proper spiritual attention, decreed the reorganization of the diocesan structure of Italy and the consolidation of small and struggling dioceses. It also recommended the abolition of anomalous units such as exempt territorial prelatures.

On 18 February 1984, the Vatican and the Italian State signed a new and revised concordat. Based on the revisions, a set of Normae was issued on 15 November 1984, which was accompanied in the next year, on 3 June 1985, by enabling legislation. According to the agreement, the practice of having one bishop govern two separate dioceses at the same time, aeque personaliter, was abolished. Instead, the Vatican continued consultations which had begun under Pope John XXIII for the merging of small dioceses, especially those with personnel and financial problems, into one combined diocese.

On 30 September 1986 the archdiocese of Amalfi was renamed the "Archdiocese of Amalfi–Cava de' Tirreni", having gained territory from and absorbing the title of the suppressed Roman Catholic Diocese of Cava de' Tirreni.

On 20 August 2012, the archdiocese gained territory consisting of three parishes, along with their oratories, houses, and other pious foundations, from the Territorial Abbey of Santissima Trinità di Cava de Tirreni.

=== Notable churches ===
- Amalfi Cathedral, dedicated to St. Andrew the Apostle.
- Co-Cathedral in Cava de' Tirreni, dedicated to the Visitation.
- Former Cathedral, in Ravello, a Minor Basilica dedicated to the Assumption of Mary and to Saint Pantaleon (1918).
- Former Cathedral, in Minori, a Minor Basilica, dedicated to St. Trofimena (1910).
- Former Cathedral, in Scala, Campania, dedicated to St. Lawrence.
- Minor Basilica of Santa Maria dell'Olmo, in Cava de' Tirreni (1931).

== Bishops and archbishops ==
=== Diocese of Amalfi ===
Erected: 6th Century

...

- Pimenius (596)

...

- Petrus (c. 829)
- Leo (c. 840)

...

- Petrus (879)
- Bonus
- Sergius
- Orso (897–920)
- Giacinto (925 – 936?)
- Costantino (947–960)
- Mastalo (960 – 987?)

=== Archdiocese of Amalfi ===
Elevated: 987

==== to 1200 ====
- Leo (Leone Orso Comite) (987–1029)
- Leone (1029–1050)
- Pietro Alferio (1050 – 1070?)
- Giovanni (1070–1082)
- Sergio Donnamira (1082–1102)
- Mauro De Monte (1103–1128)
- Giovanni della Porta (ca. 1130–1142)
- Giovanni (1142–1166)
- Giovanni di San Paolo (1166–1168)
- Roboaldo (1168–1174)
- Dionisio (1174–1202)

==== 1200 to 1400 ====
- Matteo Capuano (1202–1215)
- Giovanni Capuano (1215–1239)
- Bartolomeo Pignatelli (1254–1254)
- Gualtiero de’ Gualtieri (10 November 1254 – 1258)
- Filippo Augustariccio (1258 – 1291?)
- Andrea d’Alagno (1295–1330)
- Landolfo Caracciolo (20 September 1331 – 1350?)
- Pietro Capuano (1351 – 1362?)
- Marino del Giudice (16 April 1361 – 18 May 1373)
- Giovanni Acquaviva (1 Janaury 1375 – 1378) Avignon Obedience
- Bertrand Mormillis (7 February 1379 – 1385) Avignon Obedience
- Sergius Grisoni (1379–1392) Roman Obedience
- Nicolaus de Sora (1385–1393) Roman Obedience
- Paulus de Surrento (1393–1401) Roman Obedience

==== 1400 to 1600 ====
- Bertrandus de Alaneo (1401–1412) Roman Obedience
- Robertus de Branchea (1413–1423) Pisan Obedience
- Andrea de Palearea (28 June 1424 – 1449)
- Antonio Carlini (1449–1460 Died)
- Nicolaus Miroballo (1460–1472 Died)

Sede vacante

- Giovanni Nicolini (1475–1482 Resigned)
- Battista dei Giudici (1482–1484 Translated)
- Andrea de Conto (Cuncto) (1484–1503)
- Tommaso Regolano (1504–1510)
- Cardinal Robertus de Britto (1510) Administrator
- Cardinal Giovanni de Medici (1510–1513) Administrator
- Antonio Balestrieri, O.Cist. (1513–1516 Resigned)
- Cardinal Lorenzo Pucci (1516–1517 Resigned) Administrator
- Girolamo de Plancha (17 June 1517 – 1519)
- Girolamo Ghianderoni (1519–1530))
- Ferdinando D'Anna (1530–1541)
- Alfonso Oliva (1541–1544)
- Cardinal Francesco Sfondrati (1544–1547)
- Cardinal Tiberio Crispo (1547–1561 Resigned) Administrator
- Massimo de' Massimi (1561–1564 Resigned)
- Cardinal Tiberio Crispo (1564–1565 Resigned), Administrator
- Marco Antonio Bozzuto (1565–1570)
- Carlo Montigli (1570–1576)
- Giulio Rossini (1576–1616)

==== 1600 to 1818 ====
- Paolo Emilio Filonardi (1616–1624)
- Giacomo Theodoli (1625–1635)
- Matteo Granito (1635–1638)
- Angelo Pichi (Pico) (1638–1648)
- Stefano Quaranta (1649–1678)
- Gaetano Miraballi (Miroballi) (1679–1681)
- Simplicio Caravita (1682–1701)
- Michele de Bologna (1701–1731)
- Pietro Agostino Scorza (1731–1748 Resigned)
- Nicola Cioffi (1748–1758)
- Antonio Puoti (1758–1792)
- Silvestro Miccù (1804–1830)

==== 1818 to 1986 ====
Territory Added: 1818 from the suppressed Diocese of Minori
Territory Added: 1818 from the suppressed Diocese of Scala

- Mariano Bianco (1831–1848 Retired)
- Domenico Ventura (1849–1862)

Sede vacante (1862–1871)

- Francesco Antonio Maiorsini (1871–1893)
- Enrico de Dominicis (1894–1908)
- Antonio Maria Bonito (1908–1910 Resigned)
- Angelo Maria Dolci (1911–1914)
- Ercolano Marini (1915–1945 Retired)
- Luigi Martinelli (1946–1946)
- Angelo Rossini (1947–1965)
- Alfredo Vozzi (1972–1982 Retired)
- Ferdinando Palatucci (1982–1990 Retired)

=== Archdiocese of Amalfi-Cava de' Tirreni ===
United on 30 September 1986 with the Diocese of Cava e Sarno

- Beniamino De Palma (1990–1999)
- Orazio Soricelli (2000–)

== See also ==
- Roman Catholic Diocese of Minori
- Roman Catholic Diocese of Scala
- Roman Catholic Diocese of Sarno
- Roman Catholic Diocese of Cava de' Tirreni
- List of basilicas in Italy

== Sources ==
=== Lists of Bishops ===
- Eubel, Conradus, ed. (1913). Hierarchia catholica, Tomus 1 (second ed.). Münster: Libreria Regensbergiana. pp. 84–85. (in Latin)
- Eubel, Conradus, ed. (1914). Hierarchia catholica, Tomus 2 (second ed.). Münster: Libreria Regensbergiana. p. 86. (in Latin)
- Eubel, Conradus; Gulik, Guilelmus (1923). Hierarchia catholica, Tomus 3 (second ed.). Münster: Libreria Regensbergiana. p. 80. (in Latin)
- Gauchat, Patritius (Patrice) (1935). Hierarchia catholica IV (1592-1667). Münster: Libraria Regensbergiana. (in Latin)
- Ritzler, Remigius; Sefrin, Pirminus (1952). Hierarchia catholica medii et recentis aevi V (1667-1730). Patavii: Messagero di S. Antonio. (in Latin)
- Ritzler, Remigius; Sefrin, Pirminus (1958). Hierarchia catholica medii et recentis aevi VI (1730-1799). Patavii: Messagero di S. Antonio. (in Latin)
- Ritzler, Remigius; Sefrin, Pirminus (1968). Hierarchia Catholica medii et recentioris aevi sive summorum pontificum, S. R. E. cardinalium, ecclesiarum antistitum series... A pontificatu Pii PP. VII (1800) usque ad pontificatum Gregorii PP. XVI (1846) (in Latin). Vol. VII. Monasterii: Libr. Regensburgiana.
- Remigius Ritzler; Pirminus Sefrin (1978). Hierarchia catholica Medii et recentioris aevi... A Pontificatu PII PP. IX (1846) usque ad Pontificatum Leonis PP. XIII (1903) (in Latin). Vol. VIII. Il Messaggero di S. Antonio.
- Pięta, Zenon (2002). Hierarchia catholica medii et recentioris aevi... A pontificatu Pii PP. X (1903) usque ad pontificatum Benedictii PP. XV (1922) (in Latin). Vol. IX. Padua: Messagero di San Antonio. ISBN 978-88-250-1000-8.

=== Studies ===
- Buonaiuti, Ernesto (1911). "Amalfi, The Archdiocese of," in: The Catholic Encyclopedia Vol. 1 (New York 1907), p. 379. Supplement I Volume 17 (NY: The Encyclopedia Press 1922), p. 33.
- Camera, Matteo (1836). Istoria della città e costiera di Amalfi (in Italian). Napoli: dalla stamp. e cartiera del Fibreno. p. 436. (pious and municipally patriotic)
- Cappelletti, Giuseppe (1866). Le chiese d'Italia della loro origine sino ai nostri giorni (in Italian). Vol. 20 (vigesimo). Venezia: Giuseppe Antonelli. pp. 601–612.
- "Chronicon Archiepiscoporum Amalphitanorum," (in Latin), in: Raccolta di varie croniche, diarj, ed altri opuscoli cosi italiani, come latini appartenenti alla storia del regno di Napoli Vol. 5 (Napoli: Bernardo Perger 1782), pp. 165-181 .
- D'Avino, Vincenzo (1848). Cenni storici sulle chiese arcivescovili, vescovili, e prelatizie (nullius) del Regno delle Due Sicilie (in Italian). dalle stampe di Ranucci. pp. 14-18.. [text by Matteo Camera]. Archived.
- Kehr, Paulus Fridolinus (1935). Italia pontificia. Vol. VIII: Regnum Normannorum—Campania. (in Latin). Berlin: Weidmann. pp. 381–392.
- Kreutz, Barbara M. (1991). Before the Nrmans: Southern Italy in the Ninth and Tenth Centuries. Philadelphia: U. Pennsylvania Press.
- Loud, Graham A. (2007). The Latin Church in Norman Italy. Cambridge: CUP.
- Ughelli, Ferdinando; Coleti, NIccolo (1721). Italia sacra sive De episcopis Italiæ, et insularum adjacentium (in Latin). Vol. 7 (Tomus septimus). Venice: apud Sebastianum Coleti. pp. 183–256.
