= Howard Austen =

Longtime companion of Gore Vidal

Howard R. Austen
- Born: Howard R. Auster; January 28, 1929; New York City, New York, U.S.
- Died: September 22, 2003 (aged 74); Los Angeles, California, U.S.
- Resting place: Rock Creek Cemetery; Washington, D.C., U.S.
- Education: New York University
- Partner: Gore Vidal (1950–2003; his death)

Howard Austen (born Howard Auster; January 28, 1929 – September 22, 2003) was an American copywriter, theatrical stage manager, and film production assistant. Austen is best known as the longtime companion of writer Gore Vidal, with whom he lived for more than fifty years. He began his career working in advertising before serving as assistant stage manager for the 1955 Broadway production of Will Success Spoil Rock Hunter? and later assisted with casting for the 1962 film To Kill a Mockingbird. He also managed Vidal's personal and financial affairs.

== Early life and career ==
Howard Auster was born into a working-class Jewish family and grew up in the Pelham Parkway area of the Bronx.

According to Austen, he engaged in sexual encounters with older males during his childhood. Biographer Fred Kaplan wrote that Austen associated the secrecy and transgressive nature of such encounters with both his early discovery of sexuality and his mother's disapproval of his masturbation. In an interview with Kaplan, Austen recalled: "I did it once, I think, with the super's son that was enjoyment. I did get blown in the park, I must have been eleven, by a twenty or twenty-one-year-old guy. But I really did the seducing. I was really very aggressive about it as a child. Far more then than I would ever dream of being now. And that kind of sex was so exciting. I continued that in high school."

Austen attended Christopher Columbus High School in the Bronx.

Austen had aspirations to become a singer.

Austen had recently graduated from New York University and was struggling to find work writing advertising copy when he met writer Gore Vidal in 1950. At Vidal's suggestion, he changed his surname from "Auster" to "Austen" "after advertising firms refused to hire him because he was Jewish". Immediately after he changed his name, Austen was hired at Doyle, Dane & Bernbach, which is today known as DDB.

Austen would go on to become the assistant stage manager for the Broadway theater play Will Success Spoil Rock Hunter? in 1955. He also worked in film, assisting with the casting of the classic 1962 film To Kill a Mockingbird.

== Relationship with Gore Vidal ==
On Labor Day in 1950, Austen met Gore Vidal at New York City's Everard Baths. Shortly thereafter, he moved in with Vidal and remained his companion for the rest of his life. However, the two "always had separate bedrooms" and maintained "separate interests" sexually. Writing in Vogue in 1974, Curtis Bill Pepper observed that they "are just good friends, nothing else now." Vidal later characterized their bond as "two men who decided to spend their lives together." Reflecting on the nature of their relationship, he remarked: "It's easy to sustain a relationship when sex plays no part, and impossible, I have observed, when it does." Austen recalled to biographer Fred Kaplan:

I guess I ended up being a permanent playmate, Greek chorus, and Jewish mother. Who could ask for anything more? I got the company of Gore. Beyond anything I ever dreamed of. ... I know people are puzzled by how it works between me and Gore. What do you say? "Hi, I'm Howard Austen, I'm associated with Gore Vidal, but we don't sleep together?" You assume when two men are living together that [they do]. It was a corner that they put me into that I just had to accept.

Austen managed Vidal's financial affairs, travel arrangements, and housing needs. In 1972, Vidal purchased La Rondinaia, a villa in Ravello on Italy's Amalfi Coast, after Austen discovered the property through a classified advertisement in Rome's Il Messaggero. Over the years, the villa served as a retreat for numerous prominent guests from the worlds of literature, art, music, and film.

== Illness and death ==
In 1999, Austen, a lifelong chain smoker, was diagnosed with lung cancer. After the cancer metastasized to his brain, Vidal discussed Austen's illness in his memoir Point to Point Navigation. When Austen required treatment in the United States, Vidal chartered a private aircraft to fly him from Rome.

Austen died of a brain tumor in Los Angeles on September 22, 2003, at the age of 74. He is buried at Rock Creek Cemetery, in Washington, D.C., in a shared grave with Vidal.
