= House of Bove =

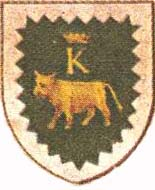
Bove Coat of Arms Libro D'Oro Patriziato di Ravello.

The House of Bove is an ancient noble patrician family of Ravello, Maritime Republic of Amalfi that held royal appointments in the Kingdom of Naples, and presided over feudal territories. After the dissolution of noble seats of the Kingdom of Naples in 1800 they were ascribed in the Libro d'Oro of Ravello. The Bove coat of arms is prominently displayed in the Duomo of Ravello.

== History ==
Knights (Cavaliere) of the House of Bove traveled north to Germany, where they lead many armed forces with the House of Grisone. Count Carl of Anjou, later titled King Charles I of Naples requested their support against King Conradin of Sicily.

In the 13th century King Charles I of Naples ennobled Sergio Bove of the House of Bove with title and feudal territories in Bitonto. Sergio Bove's title allowed him to administer trade and commerce in his feudal territories.

November 1, 1419 the House of Bove received partial exoneration of taxes from Queen Joan II of Naples, Kingdom of Naples.

Coat of Arms: a golden ox with a golden letter K,
topped with a royal crown, enclosed in a silver patterned border.

== Titles of Nobility ==
- Patriziato di Ravello: Patrician of Ravello
- Nobili di Bitonto: Noble of Bitonto. ***The Bove(s) of Bitonto use the spelling Bovio***
- Nobili di Monopoli: Noble of Monopoli

== House of Bove Palazzo(s) ==
Palazzo Bove in Bitonto, Italy

Palazzo Bove in Tramonti, Italy

== Prominent members of the House of Bove ==
- Giovanni Bove (13th century), Patrician of Ravello, Bishop of Larino (1221)
- Sergio Bove (13th century), Patrician of Ravello; Noble of Bitonto, built Palazzo Bove, and a church in Bitonto
- Giacomo Bove (13th century), Patrician of Ravello, the official Royal Court Appointment in Gaeta, Portulano Master, Proxy of Puglia (1291)
- Girolamo Bove and Ferdinand Bove, they obtained reintegration Seat of Ravello (2-7-1593)
- Antonio Bove (17th century), Patrician of Ravello, Knight of the Order of Malta (1646);
- Luigi Bove (18th century), Patrician of Ravello, Bishop of Melfi and Rapolla, Monaco of Montecassino

== Notable marriages with other families of the Nobility of Italy ==
Giovanna Bove, daughter of Giovanni Battista Bove, Patrician of Ravello, and Imperia Caracciolo] married Giovanni Battista Brancia, Patrician of Sorrento, in Naples April 25, 1605.

Girolamo Bove, Patrician of Ravello, married Cornelia Piscicelli, [daughter of Lucio Piscicelli, Patrician of Naples on June 26, 1611.

Vittoria Bove, [daughter of Andrea Bove, Patrician of Ravello, and Eleonora Bove] married Lelio Brancia II, Patrician of Sorrento, in Sorrento February 3, 1627.

Cornelia Brancia, [daughter of Lelio Brancia II, Patrician of Sorrento, and Vittoria Bove] married Antonio Teodoro, Patrician of Sorrento May 1, 1651.

== Literature ==
- Ravello e il suo patriziato, Antonio Guerritore
- Enciclopedia storico-nobiliare italiana
- Enciclopedia Araldica Italiana
- Memorie storico-diplomatiche dell'antica città e ducato di Amalfi
- Archivio Storico Italiano
- The Stones of Naples: Church Building in Angevin Italy, 1266-1343
- Istoria della città e costiera di Amalfi in due parti divisa
- Giacomo Rogadeo, Ravellese di Bitonto
- Analecta Romana Instituti Danici
- La noblesse dans les territoires angevins à la fin du Moyen Age
- l commercio a Napoli e nell'Italia meridionale nel XV secolo
- Alcuni fatti riguardanti Carlo i. di Angiò, dal 1252 al 1270, tratti dall'archivio angioino di Napoli camillo minieri riccio charles
- Quellen und Forschungen aus italienischen Archiven und Bibliotheken
- Revue historique
- Annuaire de la Société française de numismatique
- Il regno di Carlo I0 d'Angiò dal 2 gennaio 1273 al 31 dicembre 1283
- Itinerari e centri urbani nel Mezzogiorno normanno-svevo
- Mediterraneo, Mezzogiorno, Europa
- Annali delle Due Sicilie
- Illustrazione dei principali monumenti di arte e di storia del versante amalfitano
- Masserie medievali: masserie, massari e carestie da Federico II alla dogana delle pecore
- Studi meridionali
- Feudalesimo e feudatari in sette secoli di storia di un comune pugliese
- Istoria dell'antica repubblica d'Amalfi
- L'olio vergine d'oliva
- Museo di letteratura e filosofia, per cura di S. Gatti
- Materiali per l'archeologia medievale
- Dizionario storico-blasonico delle famiglie nobili e notabili italiane
- Testi e documenti di storia napoletana
- Scritti di paleografia e diplomatica di archivistica e di erudizione
- Amalfi e la sua costiera nel Settecento
- Il libro e la piazza : le storie locali dei Regni di Napoli e di Sicilia in età moderna
- Cultura e società in Puglia in età sveva e angioina
- Archivio storico per le province napoletane
- Carlo d'Anglò nei rapporti politici e commerciali con Venezia e l'oriente
- Regesto delle pergamene del Capitolo metropolitano e della Curia Arcivescovile de Trani
- Amalfi medioevale
- Cenni storici intorno i grandi uffizii del regno di Sicilia durante il regno di Carlo i. d'Angiò
- Annali di storia economica e sociale
- Elenco dei cavalieri del S.M.ordine di S. Giovanni di Gerusalemme ricevuti nella veneranda lingua d'Italia dalla fondazione dell' ordine ai nostri Giorni
- I registri della Cancelleria angioina
- Dissertazioni storiche e critiche sopra la cavalleria antica e moderna, secolare e regolare: con note, e molte figure in rame
- Cenni storici sulle chiese arcivescovili, vescovili, e prelatizie (nullius) del regno delle due Sicilie
- Gli italiani in Polonia dal IX secolo al XVIII
- Forme di potere e struttura sociale in Italia nel Medioevo
