= San Giovanni del Toro =

Church in Ravello, Italy

Coordinates: 40.6514°N 14.6126°E

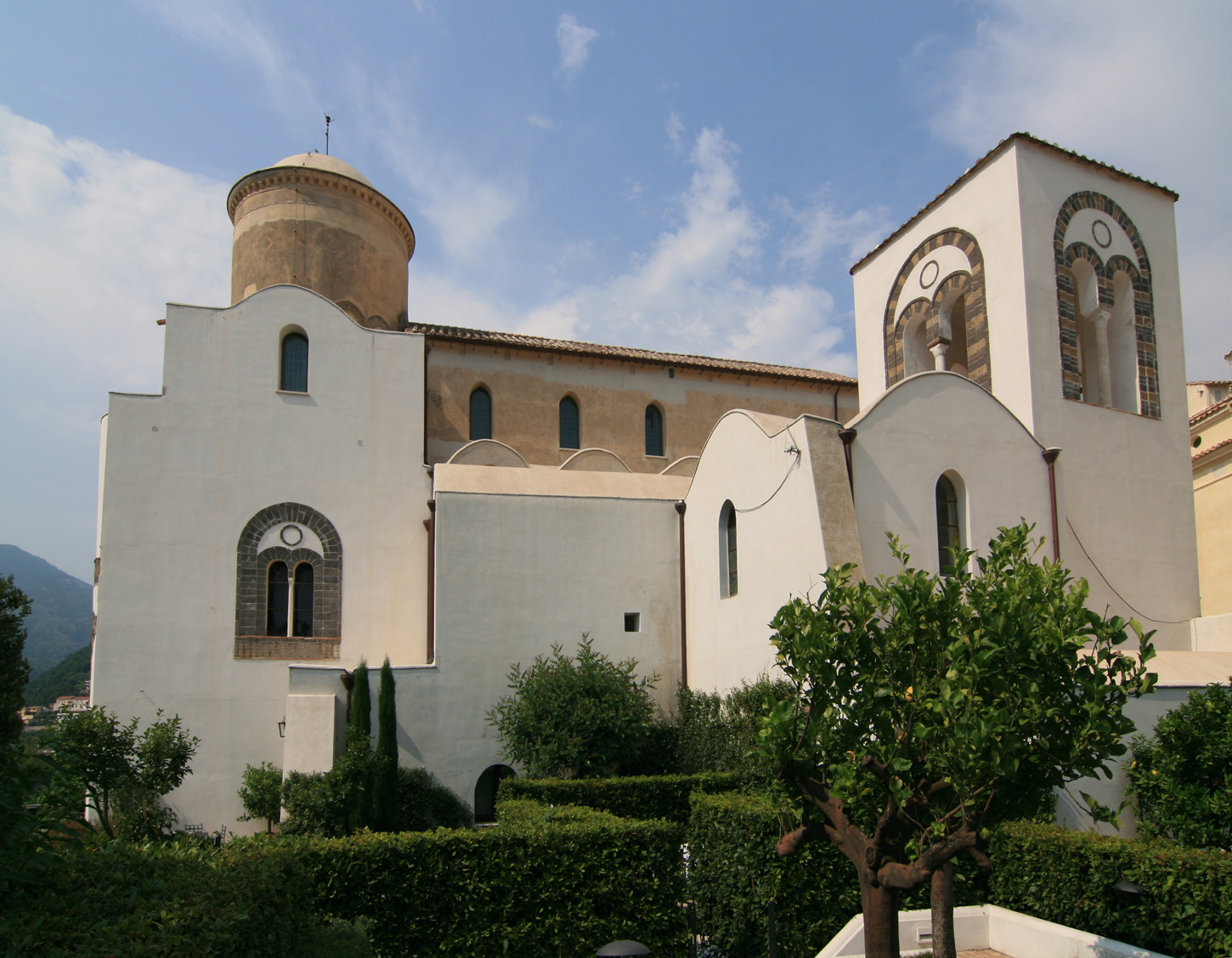
Chiesa di San Giovanni del Toro.

The Chiesa di San Giovanni del Toro (Italian: "Church of St. John of the Bull") is a church in Ravello, southern Italy.

== History ==
Consecrated in the 11th century, the church was restored in 1715 after damage caused by an earthquake, and it was restored again in the 1990s. The church is named for John the Apostle and for "Il Toro", the former name of the old aristocratic quarter in which it was built. It is especially noted for its pulpit, dating from around the 13th century.

Early 20th-century English writers describe the church as in dilapidated condition, stating it would have gone to ruins had it not been for government intervention in the 1880s. According to these authors, who ostensibly derived their knowledge from "an old history," the consecration took place in 1069, and that the church was built by orders of one of the Dukes of Amalfi.

== The pulpit ==
The pulpit is notable for its mosaics, the decorative patterns of which inspired the interlocking patterns used by M.C. Escher, who spent time in Ravello in the 1920s and studied the church and the pulpit; Ravello was one of his favorite places. One mosaic is of Jonah emerging from the whale. An eagle supports the reading desk, and it holds a book opened to the first sentence of the Gospel of John. The "beautiful" pulpit, which dates from the time of Roger I of Sicily, also contains Oriental pottery ("underglaze-painted and lustre-painted stonepaste bowls, probably Syrian") and Arabic script, and the steps up to it contain well-preserved frescoes with scenes from the life of Christ. There is a side chapel with a stucco figure of Saint Catherine and her wheel.

== Sources ==
- Gandolfo, Francesco (1999). "Il Pulpito di San Giovanni del Toro a Ravello". La scultura normanno-sveva in Campania: botteghe e modelli. Laterza. pp. 96ff. ISBN 978-88-420-5923-3.
