= Villa Cimbrone =

Historic villa in Ravello, Italy

Coordinates: 40°38′39.96″N 14°36′39.86″E

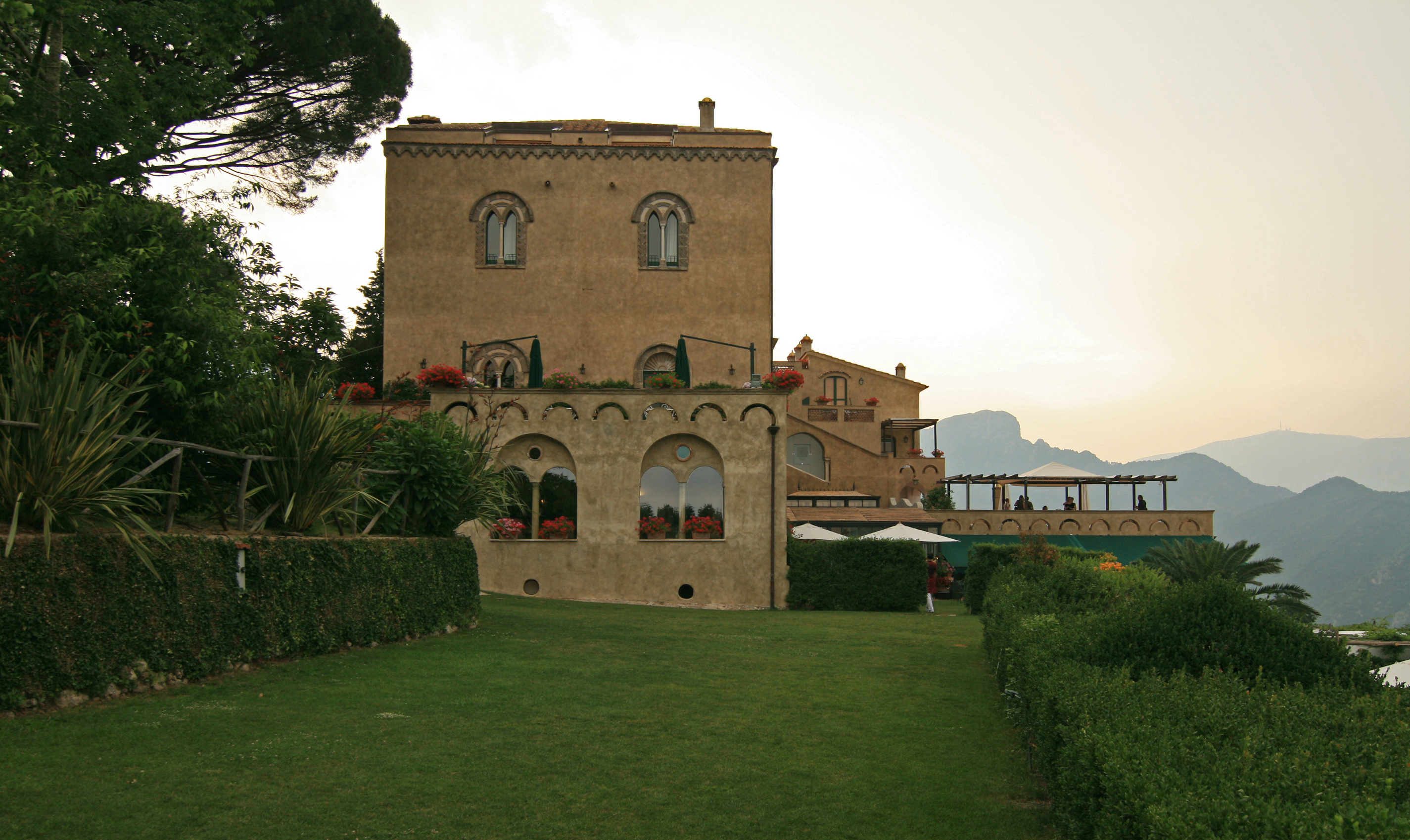
Villa Cimbrone

Villa Cimbrone is a historic villa in Ravello, on the Amalfi Coast of southern Italy. Dating from at least the 11th century, it is famous for its scenic belvedere, the Terrazza dell'Infinito (Terrace of Infinity).

Much altered and extended in the early 20th century by Ernest William Beckett (later Lord Grimthorpe), the villa is today composed of many salvaged architectural elements from other parts of Italy and elsewhere; little of the original structure remains visible.

The gardens were redeveloped by Beckett at the same time. The villa is now a hotel and its gardens are open to the public.

== History ==
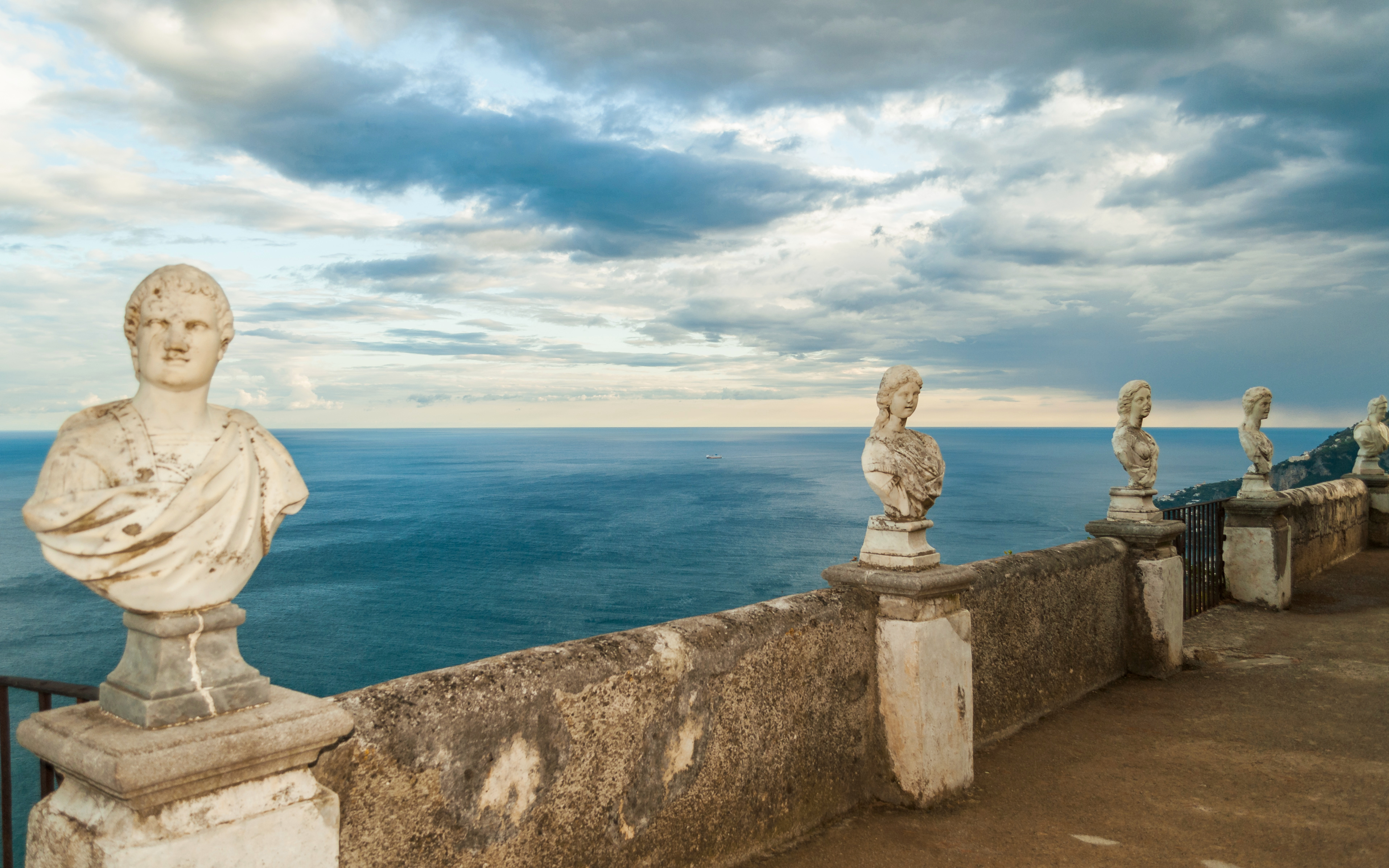
Terrazza dell'lnfinito, Villa Cimbrone's belvedere

Villa Cimbrone stands on a rocky outcrop known as "Cimbronium", and it is from this landscape feature that the villa takes its name. The earliest references to the villa date back to the 11th century, when the villa belonged to the Accongiogioco, a noble family. It later passed to the ownership of a wealthy and influential family, the Fusco, who are also recorded in 1291 as owning the local church of S. Angelo de Cimbrone.

Later, the villa became part of the nearby monastery of Santa Chiara, and during this period of the villa's history the papal arms of Cardinal Della Rovere were placed over the old entrance gate. From the 17th century, the villa's history is vague, but by the latter half of the 19th century it had passed to the Amici family of Atrani. It was visited by the historian Ferdinand Gregorovius, who described it thus in his Siciliana: Wanderings in Naples and Sicily (1861):

Incomparable ... where the most beautiful flowers you can imagine flourished, coming from numerous plants of the South ... redesigned and enriched with countless ... ornamental features, small temples, pavilions, bronze and stone statues.

and referring to the belvedere (known as the Terrazza dell'Infinito):

While contemplating from those Armida's orchards, among the roses and the hydrangeas, that magic sea in which the blue colour of a very limpid sky is reflected, the wish of being able to fly comes out ... Right at the edge of the crag there was a terrace commanding an enchanting view; it was surrounded by horrible marble statues which, however, from afar, had a sort of appeal.

=== Twentieth century alterations ===
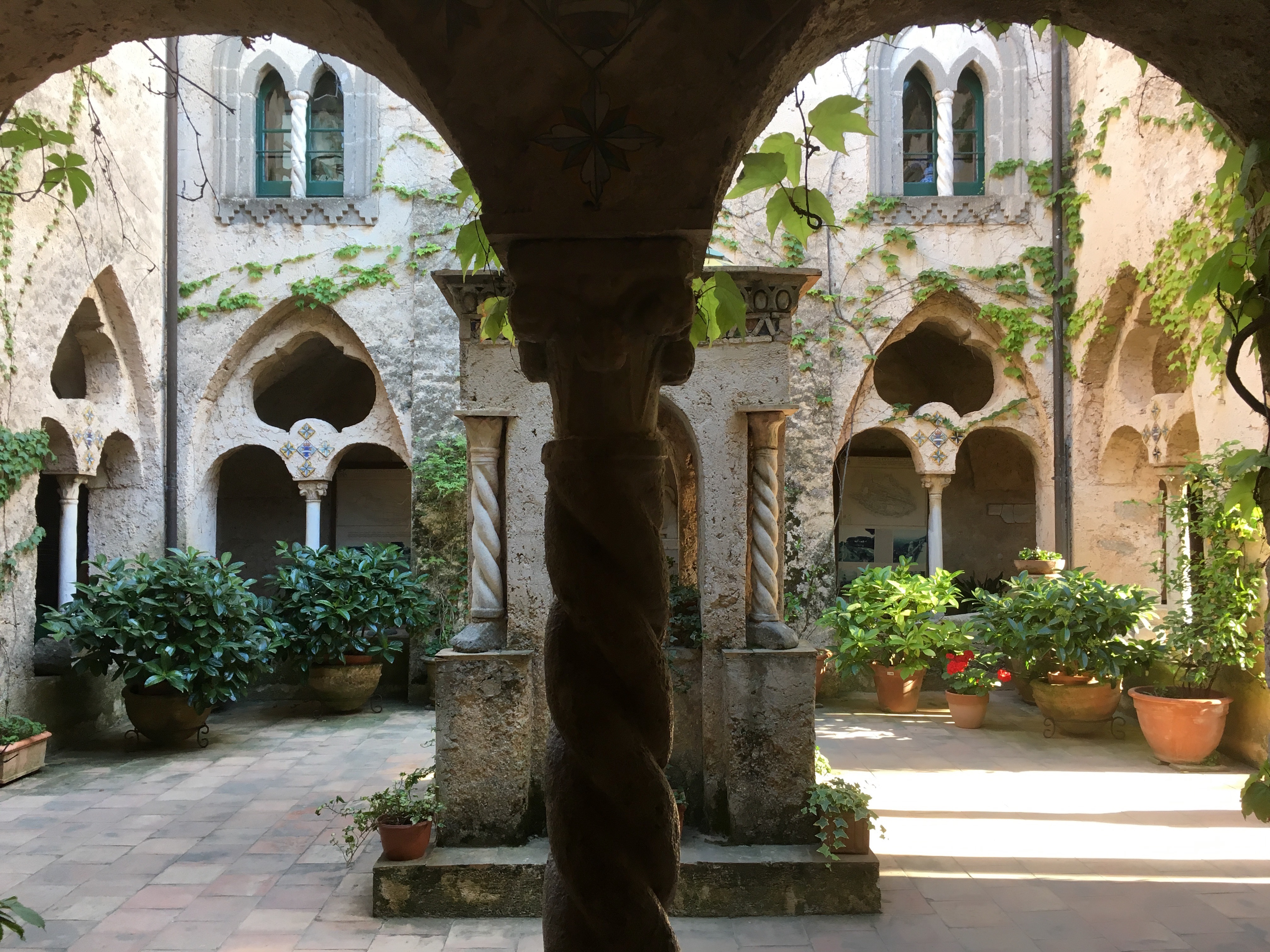
The Cloister

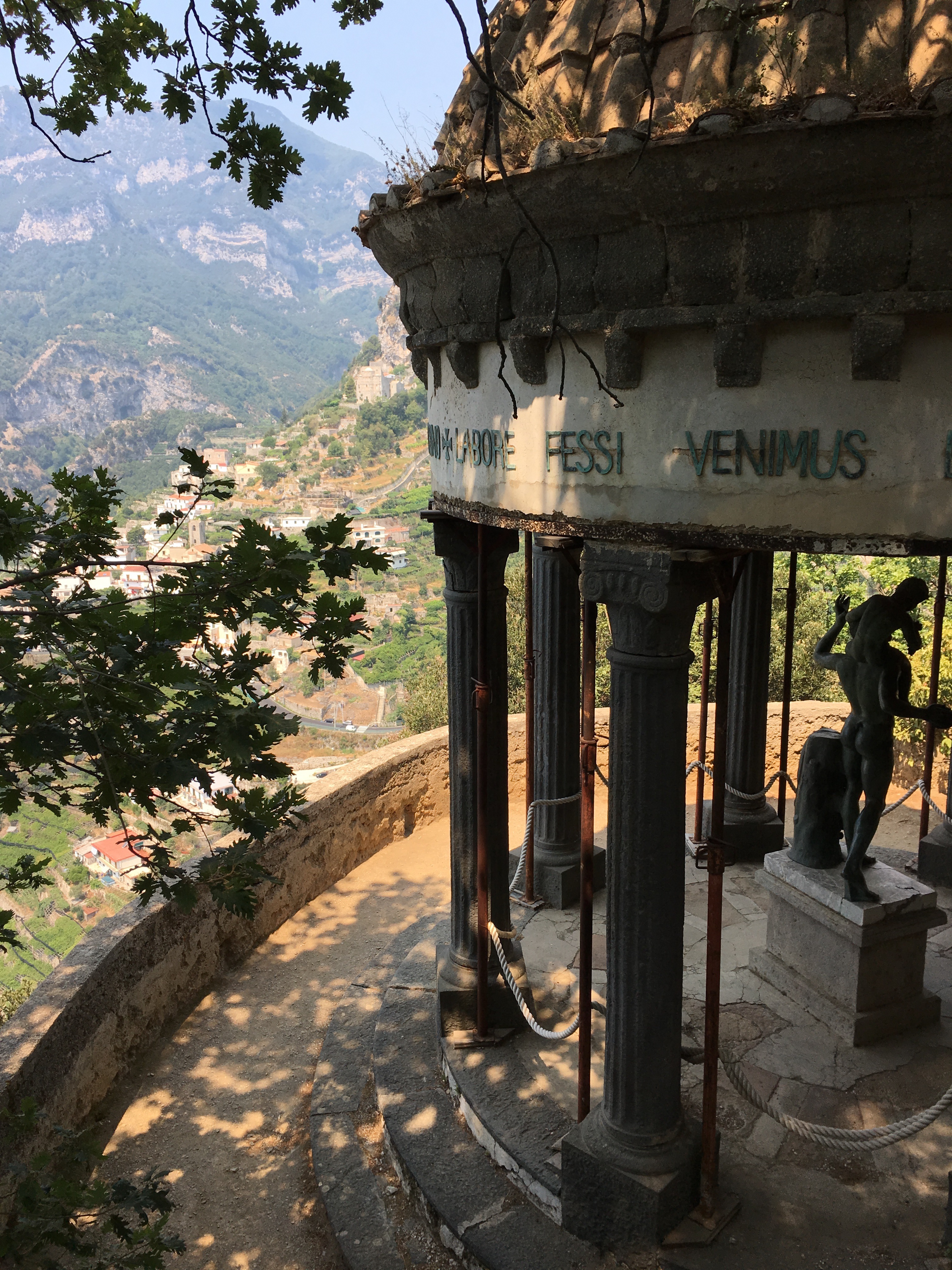
The Temple of Bacchus

Ernest Beckett had visited the villa during his travels in Italy and had fallen in love with it. He bought it from the Amici family in 1904, and enlisted the help of Nicola Mansi, a tailor-barber-builder from Ravello whom he had met in England, to help with the restoration and enlargement of the villa and gardens. He embarked on an ambitious programme of works, including the construction of battlements, terraces and cloister in a mixture of mock-Gothic, Moorish, and Venetian architectural styles. The gardens, strung out along the cliff face, were similarly redeveloped. Beckett was reputed to be the father of Violet Trefusis; the connection with Violet brought Vita Sackville-West and Harold Nicolson as visitors, and Vita is said to have given advice about the garden, though her own gardening ventures at Long Barn still lay some years in the future. Beckett died in London in 1917 and his body was brought to Villa Cimbrone to be buried at the base of the Temple of Bacchus in the gardens; apt lines of Catullus are inscribed on the frieze:

Quid solutis est beatius curis
cum mens onus reponit, ac peregrino
labore fessi venimus larem ad nostrum,
desideratoque adquiescimus lecto?

Oh what is more blest than when the mind,
Cares dispelled, puts down its burden
And we return, tired from our travelling, to our home
To rest on the bed we have longed for?

After Beckett's death, the villa passed to his son. Beckett's daughter Lucy (Lucille Catherine Beckett, 1884–1979) also lived at the villa, where she was a keen gardener and breeder of roses, including the "Rose of Ravello" in the 1930s.

Many famous visitors came to the villa during the Beckett family's ownership. It was a favourite haunt of the Bloomsbury Group, including Virginia Woolf, Leonard Woolf, E. M. Forster, John Maynard Keynes, and Lytton Strachey. Other visitors included D. H. Lawrence, Edward James, Diana Mosley, Henry Moore, T. S. Eliot, Jean Piaget, Winston Churchill and the Duke and Duchess of Kent. The actress Greta Garbo and her then-lover, the conductor Leopold Stokowski, stayed at the villa several times in the late 1930s; a visit of 1938 is memorialized on a plaque.

The villa was featured in the 1953 John Huston film Beat the Devil, in particular an extended scene of Humphrey Bogart and Jennifer Jones romancing on the Terrazza dell'lnfinito.

=== Today ===
The villa was sold in the 1970s to the Vuilleumier family, who used it first as a private family home, and for the past few years as a hotel. In 1976, the American writer Gore Vidal, who lived in La Rondinaia (a nearby house built by Lucy Beckett) from 1972 to 2004, wrote of Villa Cimbrone:

Twenty-five years ago I was asked by an American magazine what was the most beautiful place that I had ever seen in all my travels and I said the view from the belvedere of the Villa Cimbrone on a bright winter's day when the sky and the sea were each so vividly blue that it was not possible to tell one from the other.

The villa was depicted briefly in the 2020 film Tenet directed by Christopher Nolan.

== Gallery ==
The Cloister

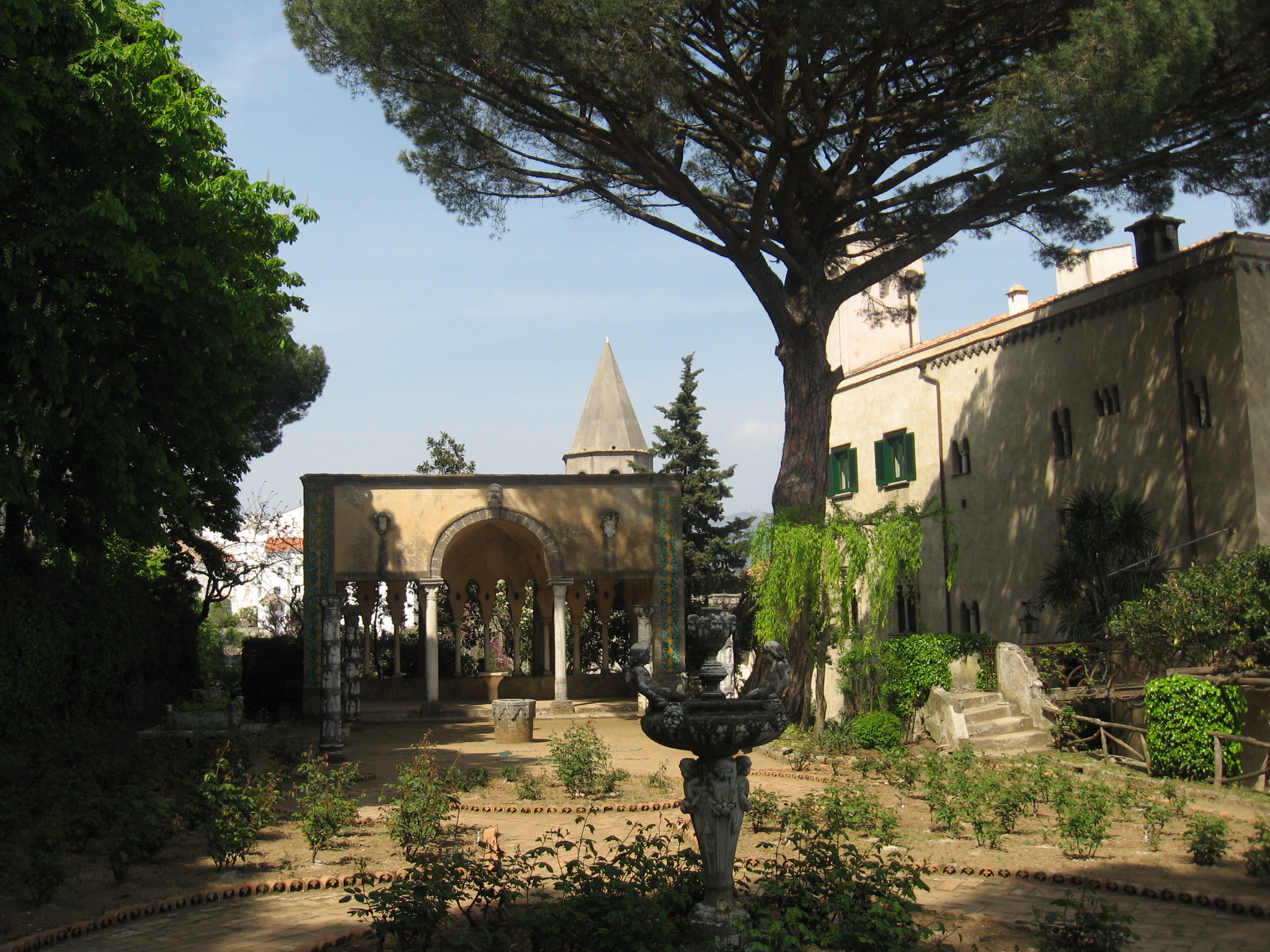
The Tea-Room

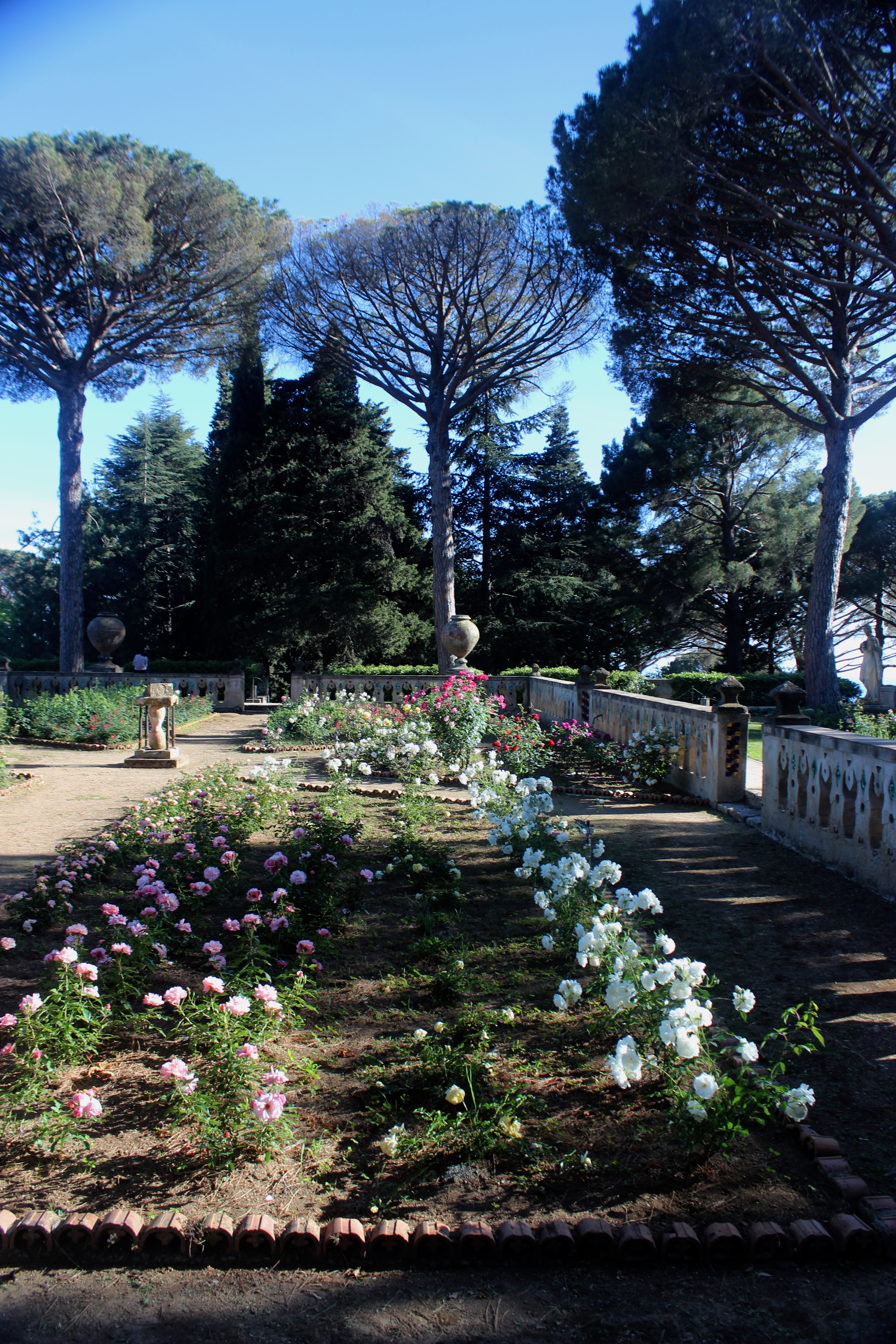
The Rose Terrace

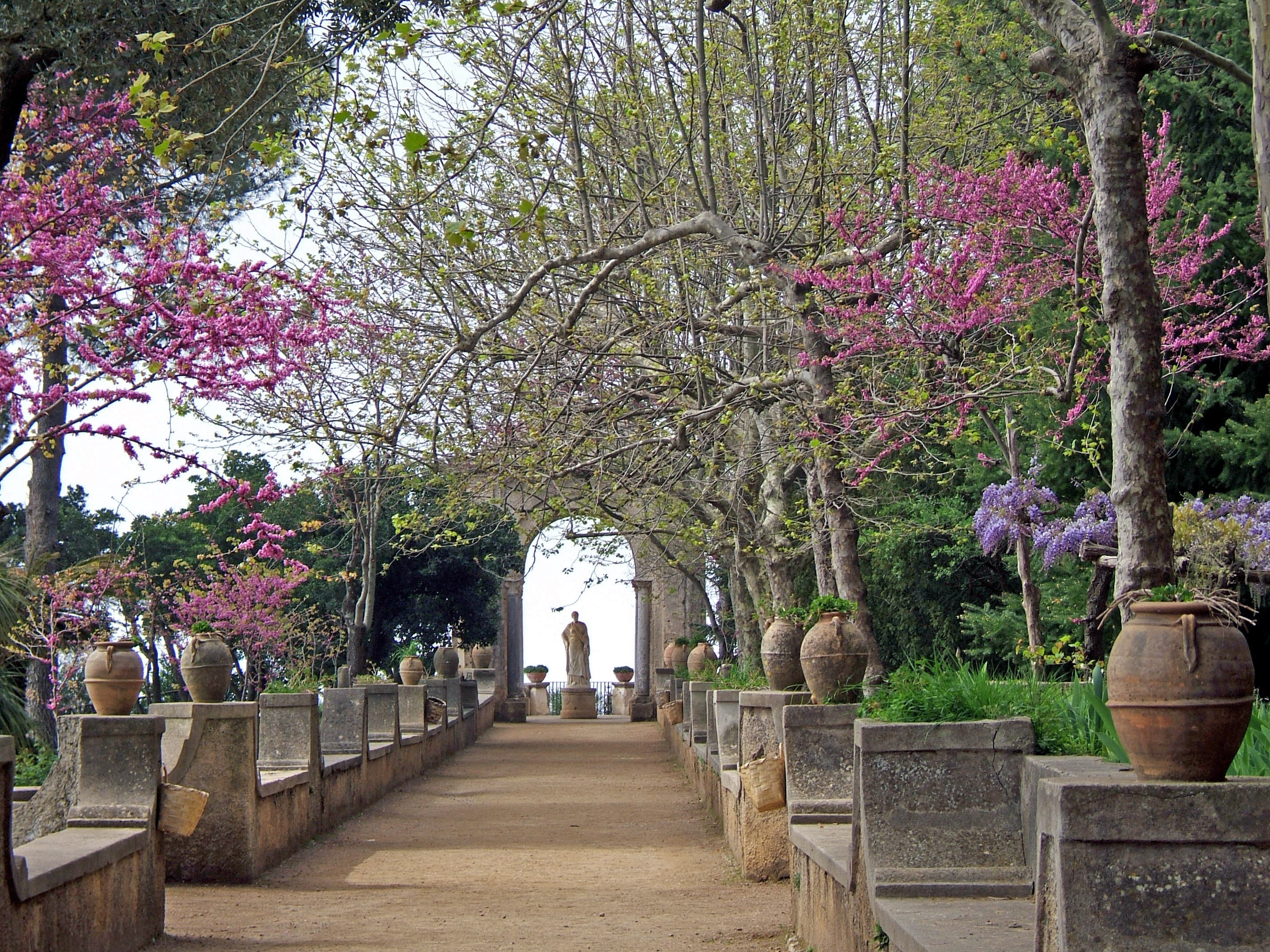
The Gardens

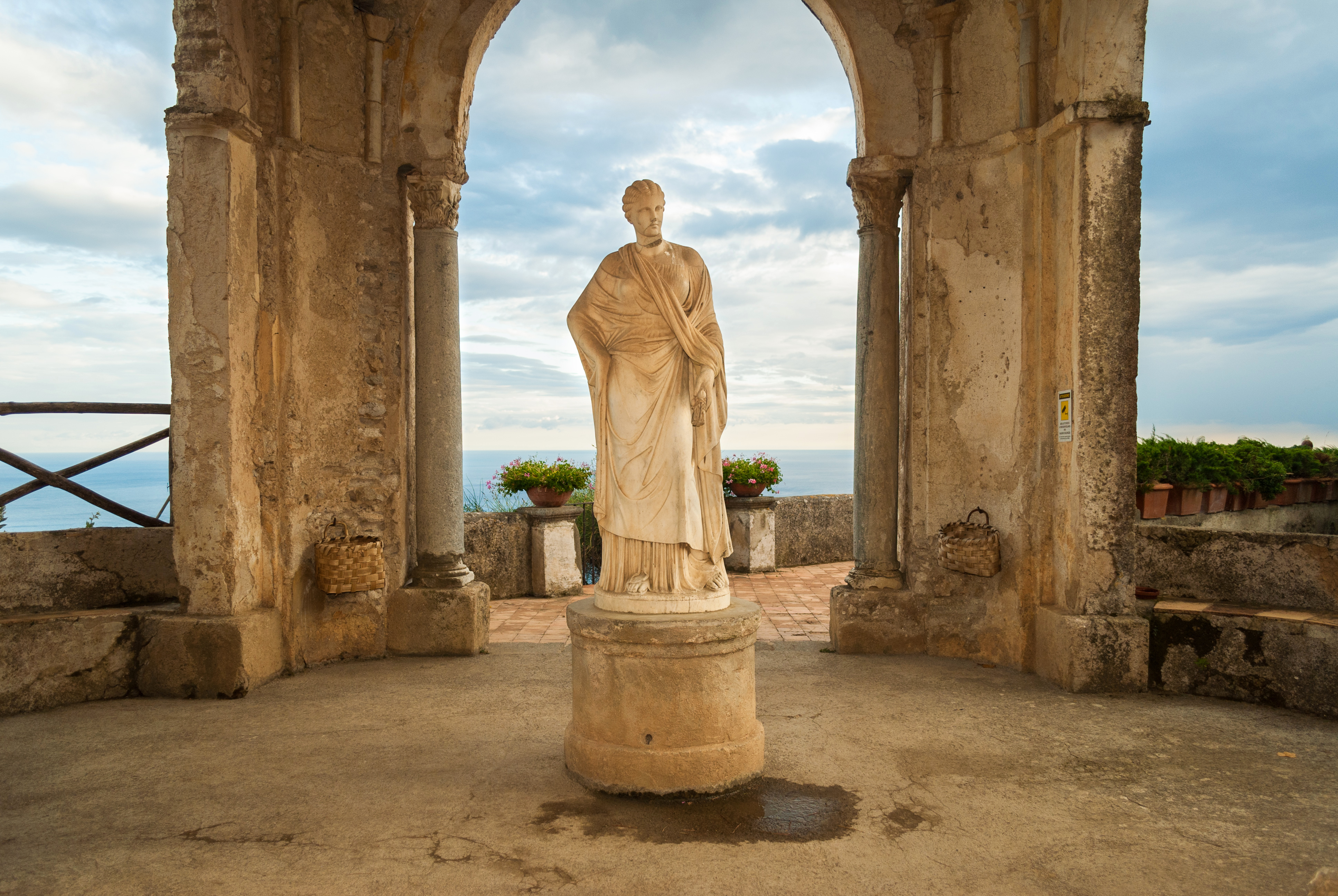
Statue of Ceres

== See also ==
- Gulf of Salerno
- Villa Rufolo
