= Beat Onto Jazz Festival =

Italian jazz festival

Beat Onto Jazz Festival is a jazz festival held annually in Bitonto, Italy since 2001. It is held on the main piazza of the town next to the cathedral. The Alberto Parmegiani Quartet performed in 2016.
