= Bitonto =

Italian town in Apulia

Bitonto Vetònde
- Comune
- Comune di Bitonto
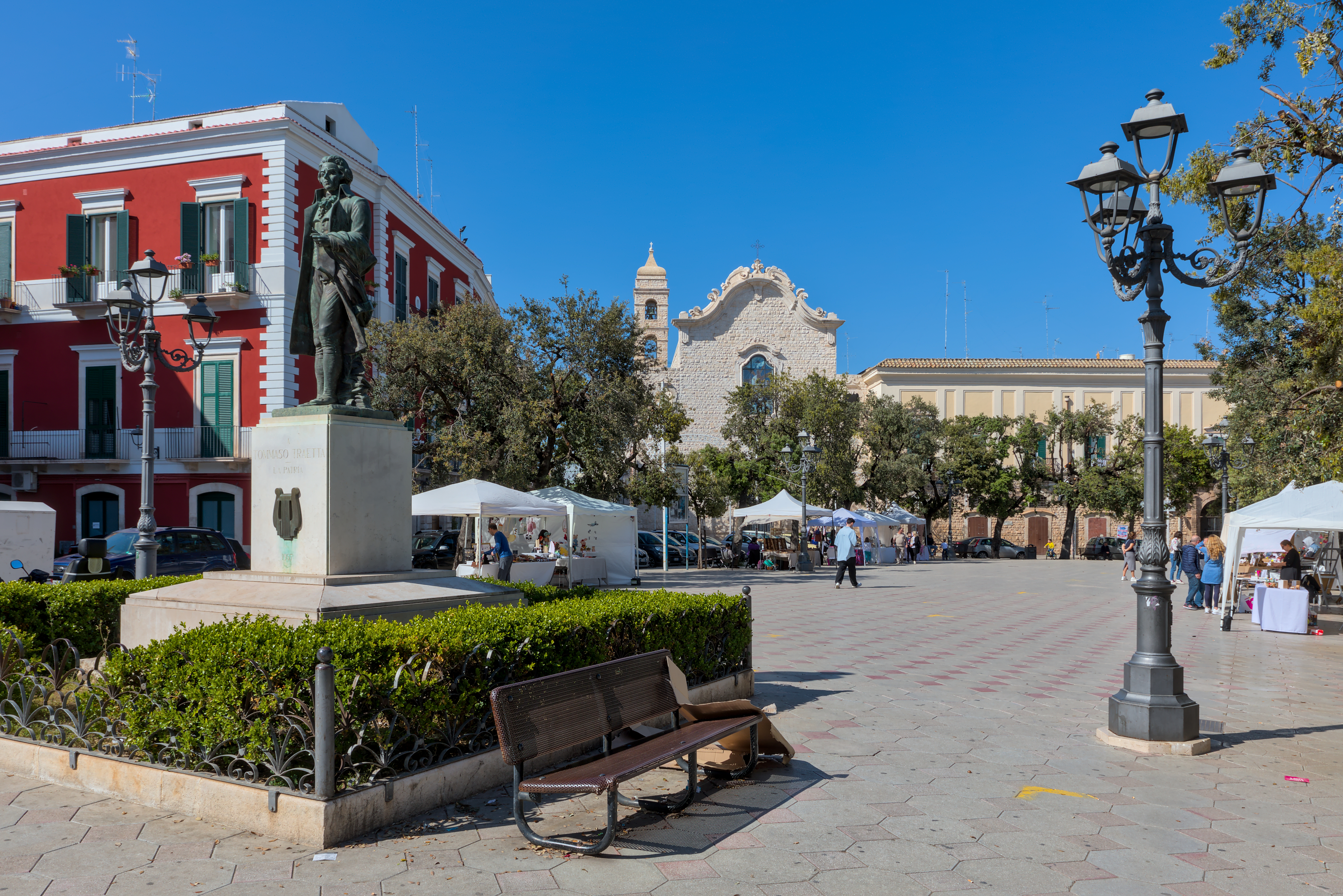
- Piazza Aldo Moro, in the center

- Coat of arms
- Nickname: Città degli Ulivi ("City of Olives")
- Bitonto within the Province of Bari

- Location within Italy Location within Apulia
- Coordinates: 41°07′N 16°41′E
- Country: Italy
- Region: Apulia
- Metropolitan city: Bari (BA)
- Frazioni: Mariotto, Palombaio

Government
  - Mayor: Francesco Paolo Ricci

Area
  - Total: 172.9 km^{2} (66.8 sq mi)
- Elevation: 118 m (387 ft)

Population (30 April 2017)
  - Total: 55,320
  - Density: 320.0/km^{2} (828.7/sq mi)
- Demonym: Bitontini
- Time zone: UTC+1 (CET)
  - Summer (DST): UTC+2 (CEST)
- Postal code: 70032
- Dialing code: 080
- Patron saint: Immaculate Conception
- Saint day: May 26
- Website: Official website

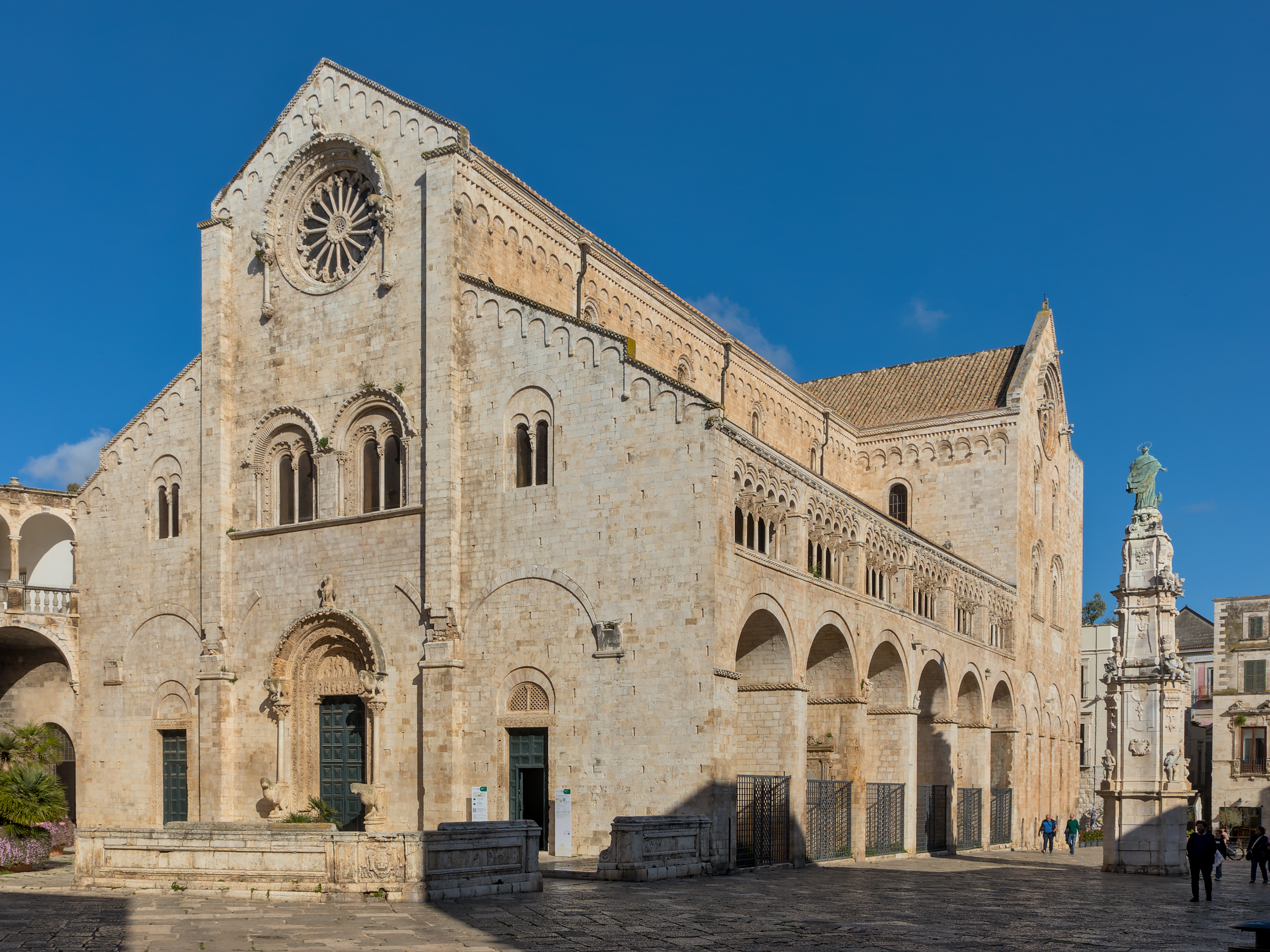
Bitonto Cathedral

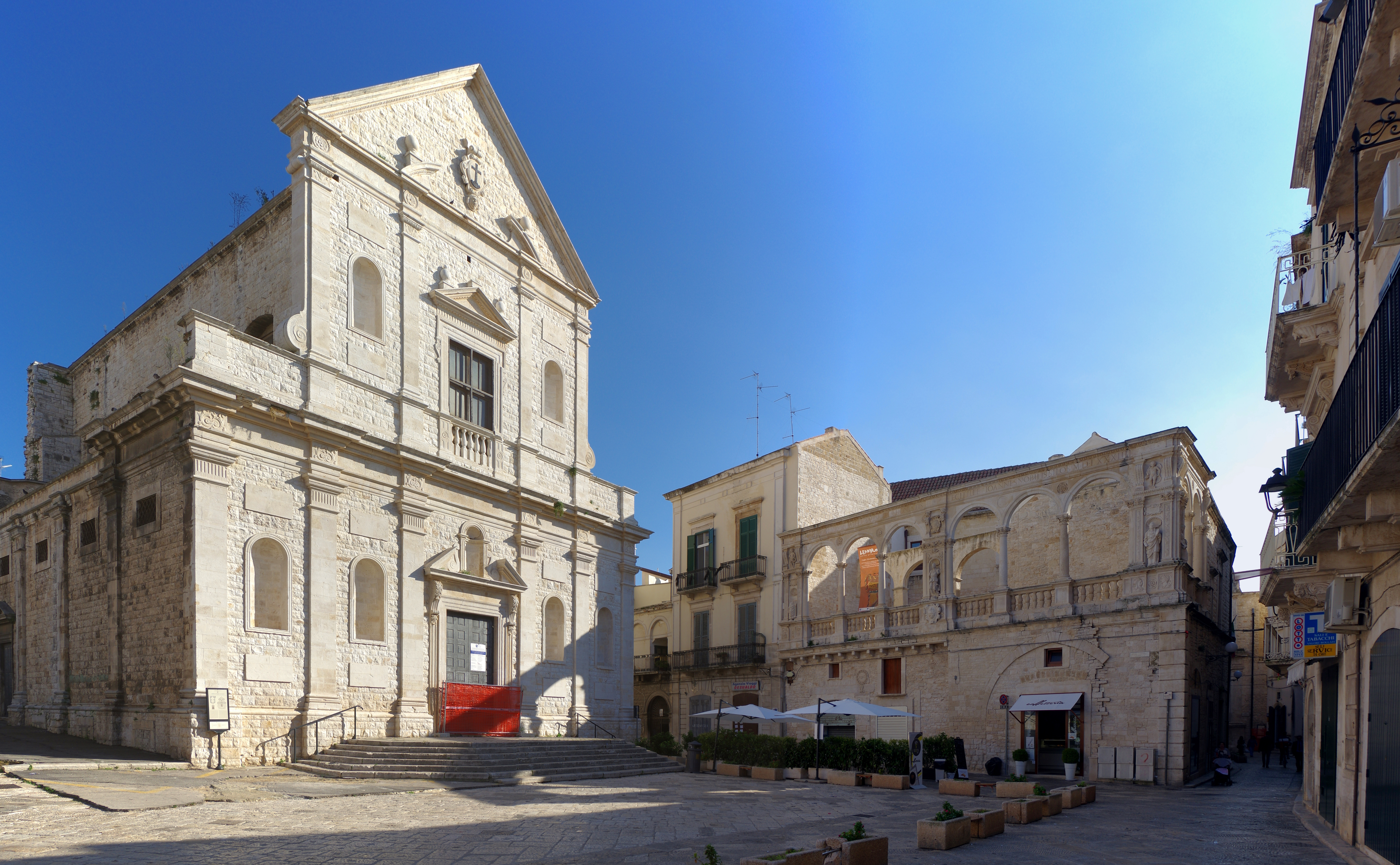
Palaces in Cavour Square

Bitonto (Italian: [biˈtonto]; Bitontino: Vetònde) is a comune in the Metropolitan City of Bari, in the Italian region of Apulia. It lies to the west of Bari. It is nicknamed the "City of Olives", due to the numerous olive groves surrounding the city.

== Geography ==
Bitonto lies approximately 11 km (7 miles) to the west of the city of Bari, near the coast of the Adriatic Sea. The bordering municipalities are Bari, Bitetto, Palo del Colle, Altamura, Toritto, Ruvo di Puglia, Terlizzi, and Giovinazzo. The hamlets (frazioni) are Mariotto and Palombaio.

== History ==
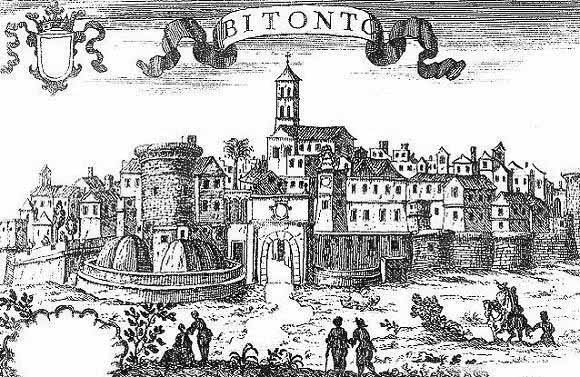
Old engraving of Bitonto

The city was founded by the Peucetii, and its inhabitants referred to by the Greek settlers of the region as Butontinoi, an ethnonym of uncertain derivation. According to one tradition, the city was named after Botone, an Illyrian king. Its first city wall can be dated to the fifth to fourth centuries BC; traces remain in the foundations of the Norman walling.

Similarities of coinage suggest that Bitonto was under the hegemony of Spartan Tarentum, but bearing the numismatic legend BITONTINON. Later, having been a Roman ally in the Samnite Wars, the civitas Butuntinenses became a Roman municipium, preserving its former laws and self-government and venerating its divine protectress, whom the Romans identified by interpretatio romana as Minerva; the site sacred to her is occupied by the Church of San Pietro in Vincoli. As a city of the Late Roman Empire, Bitonto figures in the Liber Colonis of Frontinus, in the Antonine Itinerary and other Imperial itineraries, and the Tabula Peutingeriana, a post where fresh horses were to be had for travellers on the Via Traiana for Brundisium.

The foundations of a Paleochristian basilica came to light in excavations beneath the cathedral's crypt, but no written evidence survives of an established diocese in the Early Middle Ages. Though there is no evidence that a Lombard gastaldo had his seat at Bitonto, Lombard customs and law insinuated themselves deeply in local social fabric.

During the 9th century, Bitonto successfully withstood a Saracen raid, in which the besiegers' leader was killed beneath the city's walls. Bitonto took part in the revolt of Melus of Bari in 1009.

In the Middle Ages Bitonto was a fief of several baronial families, before it passed permanently in the thirteenth century to the Acquaviva, who took their name from their stronghold at Acquaviva delle Fonti: The Acquaviva were later dukes of Atri, and their minor signory of Bitonto was raised to a marquisate in 1464 by the King of Naples, Ferrante di Aragona in favour of Giovanni Antonio Acquaviva; on his premature death it passed to his brother, the successful and cultivated condottiero Andrea Matteo Acquaviva, who exchanged it in 1487 for the marquessate of Ugento, which he subsequently lost. In 1552 the citizens paid for the city's freedom the considerable sum of 66,000 ducats.

In 1734, during the War of Polish Succession, the Spanish army under Charles of Bourbon and the Duke of Montemar defeated the Austrians under Giuseppe Antonio, Prince of Belmonte at the Battle of Bitonto, thus securing possession of the Kingdom of Naples for the Bourbons.

On September 6, 1928 the village of the Holy Spirit, the only access to the coast and the subject of border disputes between the two cities since the thirteenth century, passed to the municipality of Bari. The territory stolen had a surface area of about 16 square kilometers.

== Main sights ==
The city includes a medieval burg and a modern area.

The main landmarks include:

- The Castle and the walls
- The Romanesque Bitonto Cathedral (Cattedrale di S. Valentino), built in the 11th-12th centuries and influenced by the Basilica of San Nicola in Bari. The west façade is divided in three parts and has three portals, the central one sculpted with vegetables motifs and scenes from the Old Testament, four mullioned windows and a rose window flanked by sculptures of animals supported by small columns. The interior has a nave and two aisles: the main artwork is the marble ambo (1229), a masterwork of medieval Apulian sculpture.
- The Basilica of SS Cosma e Damiano
- The church of San Francesco (12th century). It was built in 1283 over a pre-existing Roman fortification, to celebrate the 1222 visit of St. Francis of Assisi. It has kept the original late-Romanesque façade, flanked by a 16th-century bell tower. The portal has figures of bovine animals, probably an allusion to the founder family of the church, Bove. It is surmounted by a triple mullioned window. The interior has some frescoes and 16th-century altars.
- The church of San Gaetano
- The church of San Domenico
- The church of Santa Caterina
- The Sylos-Labini Palace
- The Bove Palace
- The Late Renaissance Palazzo Sylos-Vulpano

== Economy and culture ==
Bitonto is well known for its production of extra virgin olive oil, which is exported to America and elsewhere in Europe. The city also produces wine, beer, cereals, almonds, and textiles.

Recently, Bitonto has also become a popular tourist destination. It has hosted the Beat Onto Jazz Festival since 2001.

== Transportation ==
Bitonto is not directly connected to the Italian national railway system (FS). However, it is serviced by an electric rail line, the Bari–Barletta, operated privately by Ferrotramviaria, and counts two stations: Bitonto and Bitonto Santi Medici. Bitonto is 8 kilometres (5 miles) away from the international Karol Wojtyła Airport of Bari.

Around Bitonto, there is a ring road resembling a near perfect circle, from which only the easternmost portion is missing.

== Sport ==
The local association football club is the U.S. Bitonto, and its home ground is the Città degli Ulivi Stadium.

== People ==
- Caffarelli (Gaetano Majorano), castrato opera singer
- Vitale Giordano, mathematician
- Nicola Bonifacio Logroscino, musician
- Carlo Rosa, painter
- Gennaro Rubino, unsuccessful assassin of King Leopold II of Belgium
- Tommaso Traetta, musician and reformer of the Baroque Opera
- Michele Morrone, (365 days actor)

== International relations ==
Bitonto is twinned with:

- (Bosnia and Herzegovina) Banja Luka, Bosnia-Herzegovina
- Durrës, Albania

== Sources ==
- A Virtual Tour in the city of Bitonto - Official Web site City of Bitonto, Councillorships for Tourism and Culture
- Bitonto.net
