= Villa Rufolo =

Villa in southern Italy

Coordinates: 40.6442°N 14.6108°E

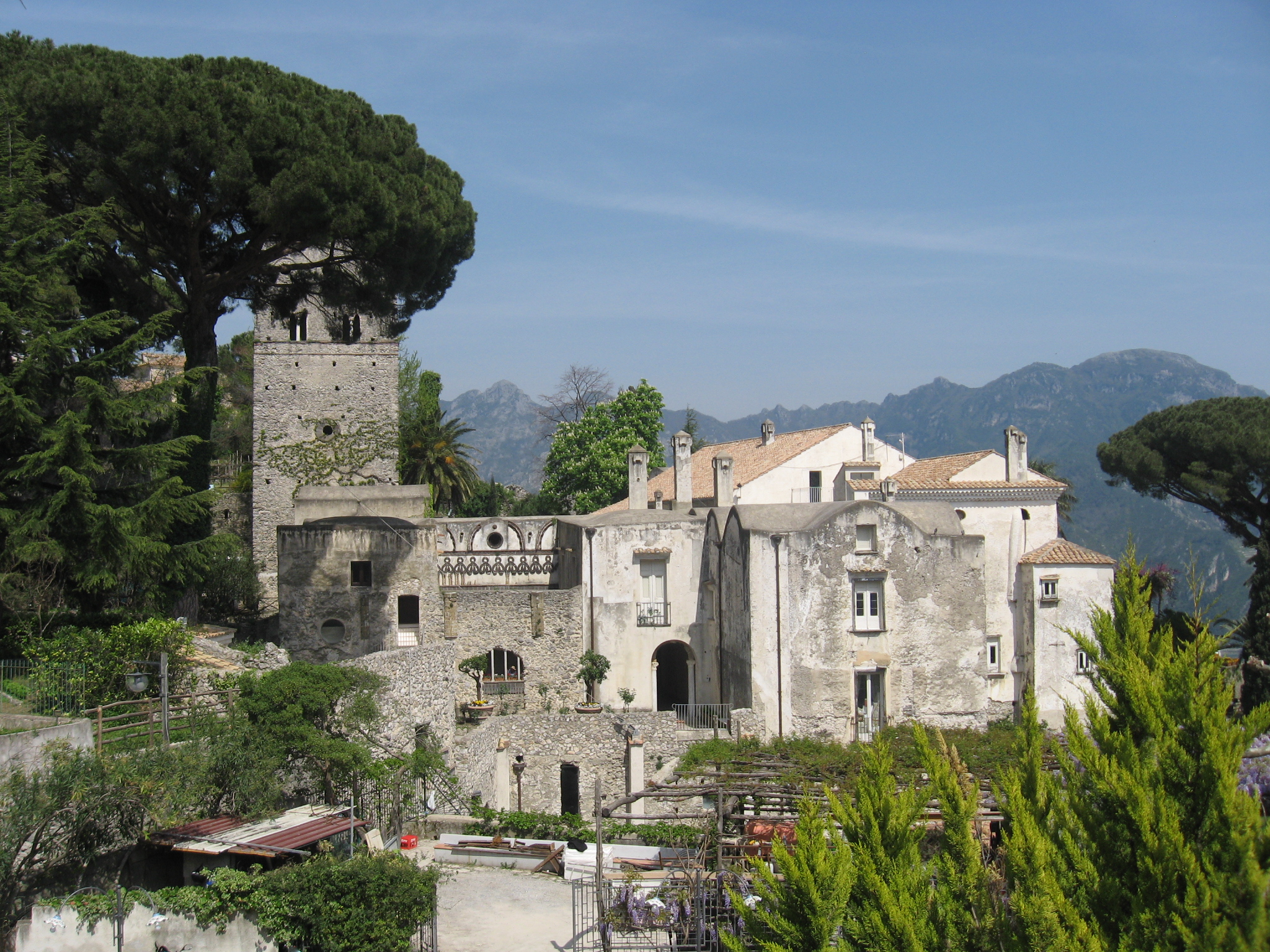
Villa Rufolo

Villa Rufolo is a villa within the historic center of Ravello, a town in the province of Salerno, southern Italy, which overlooks the front of the cathedral square. The initial layout dates from the 13th century, with extensive remodeling in the 19th century.

== History ==
Originally belonging to the powerful and wealthy Rufolo family who excelled in commerce (a Landolfo Rufolo has been immortalized by Boccaccio in the Decameron), it then passed by inheritance to other owners such as the Confalone, Muscettola and d'Afflitto.

Around the middle of the nineteenth century it was sold to the Scotsman Francis Neville Reid who took care of a general restoration, resulting in today's layout.

The villa is entered through an opening in the arched entrance tower, and after a short street a clearing is dominated by the Torre Maggiore: the latter facing the bell tower of the cathedral in Ravello, overlooking the terraces (upper and lower) as well as overlooking the Amalfi Coast and the Gulf of Salerno with flower gardens that are in bloom most of the year.

Of particular interest among the rooms of the villa is a large courtyard elevated like a cloister and some rooms forming a small museum.

The German opera composer Richard Wagner visited the villa in 1880. He was so overcome by the beauty of the location that he imagined the setting as the garden of Klingsor in the second act of Parsifal. In commemoration, every year the lower garden of Villa Rufolo hosts a Wagnerian concert.

== Gallery ==
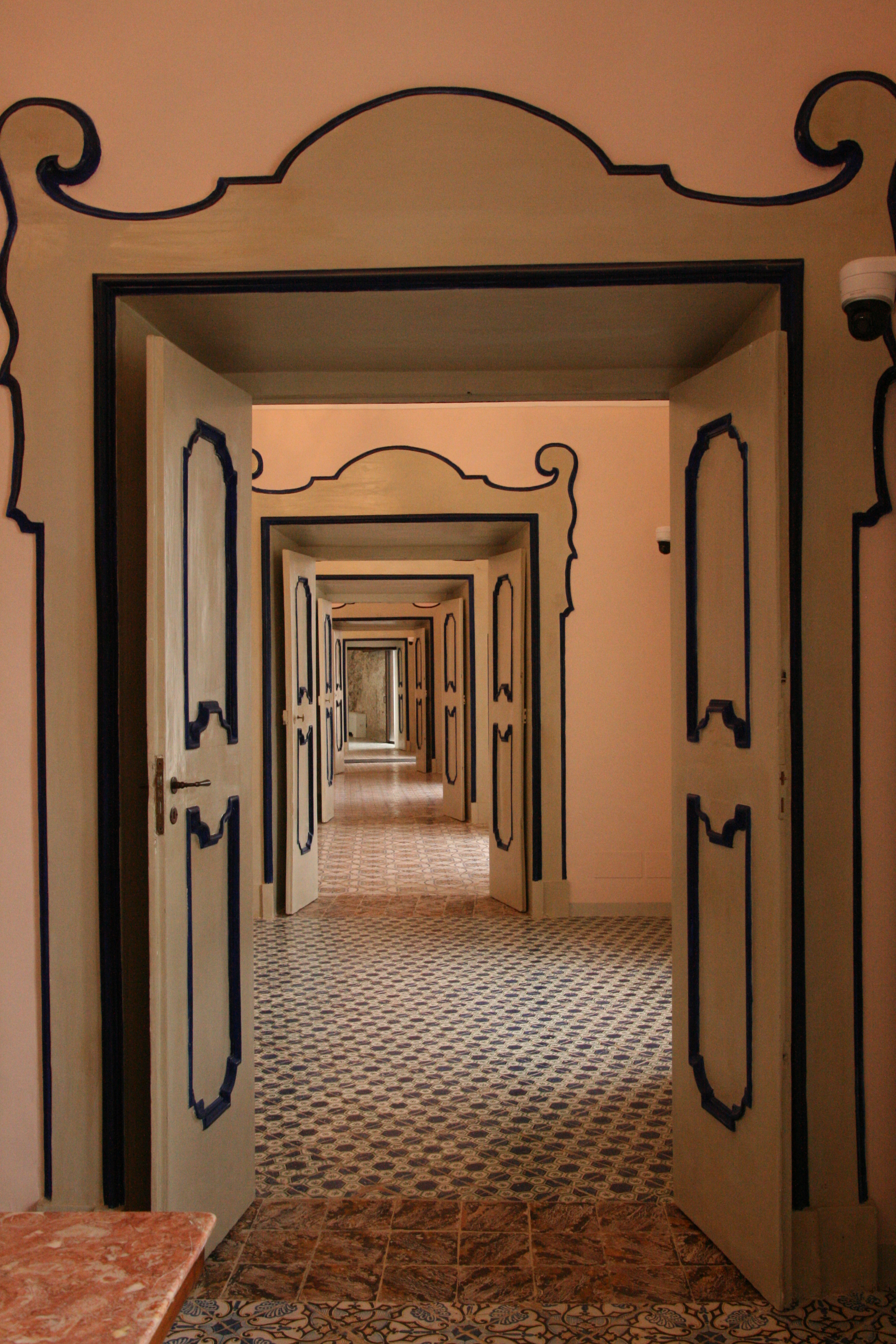
Interior

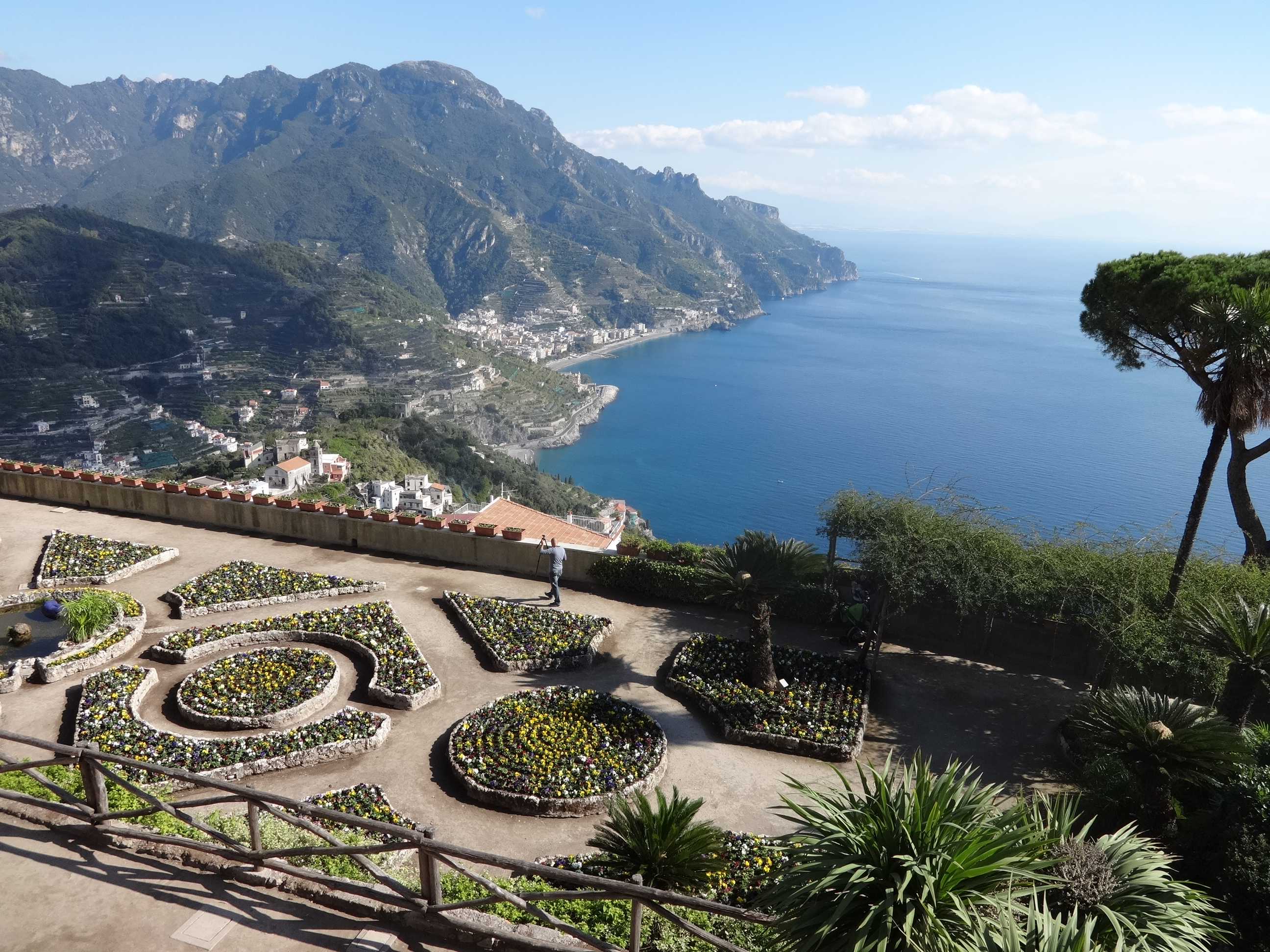
Gardens

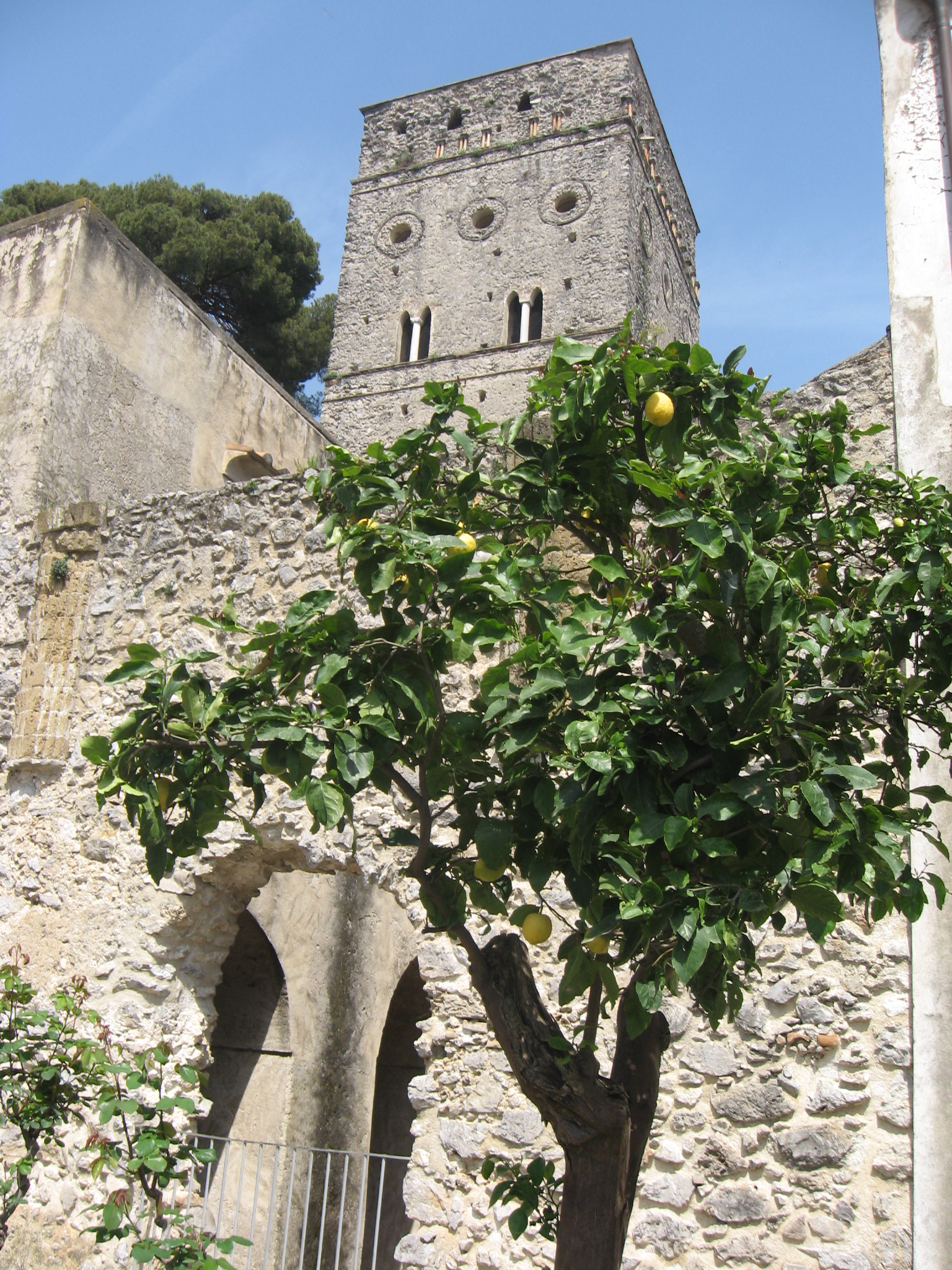
Torre Maggiore

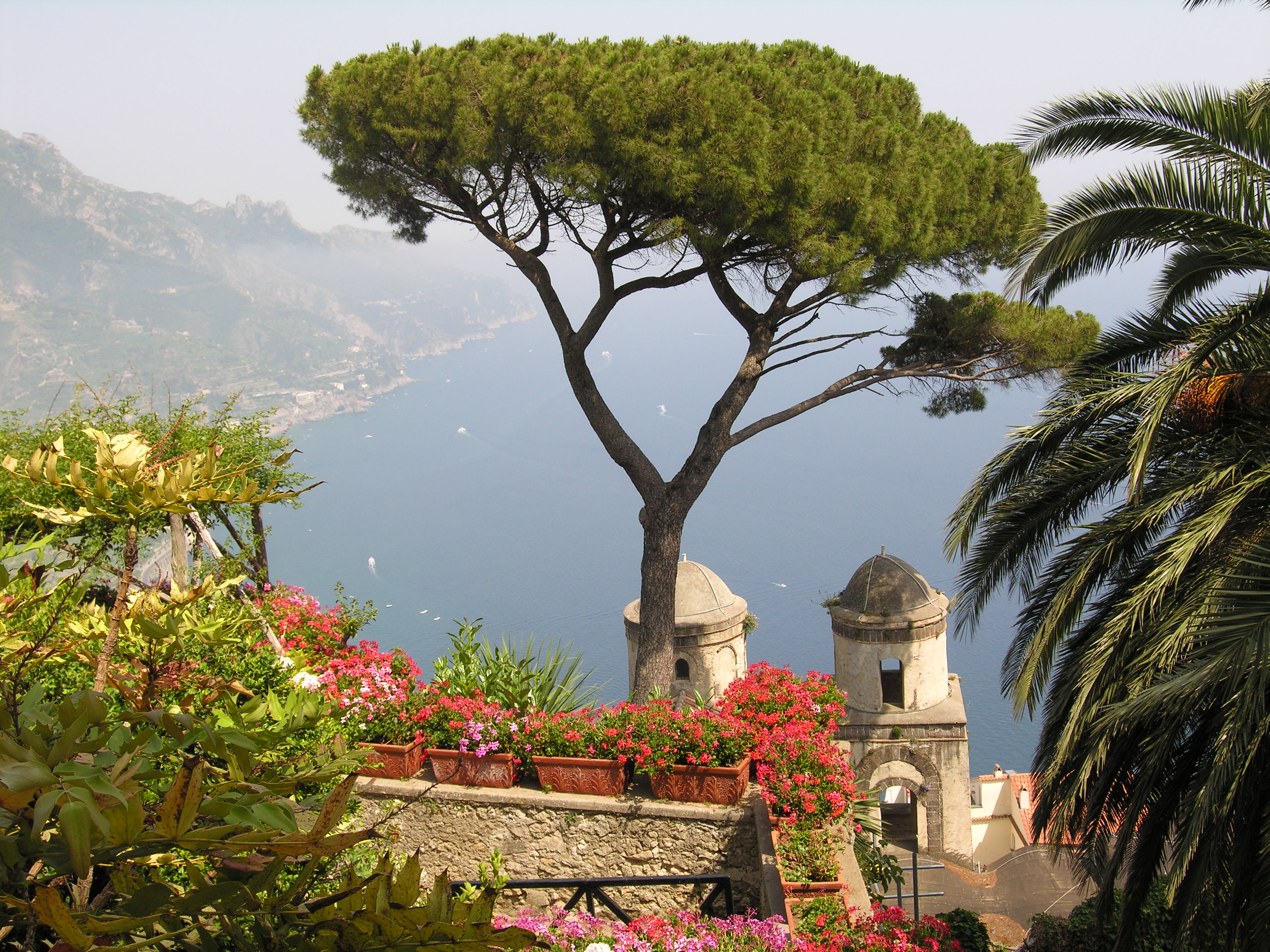
View of the sea

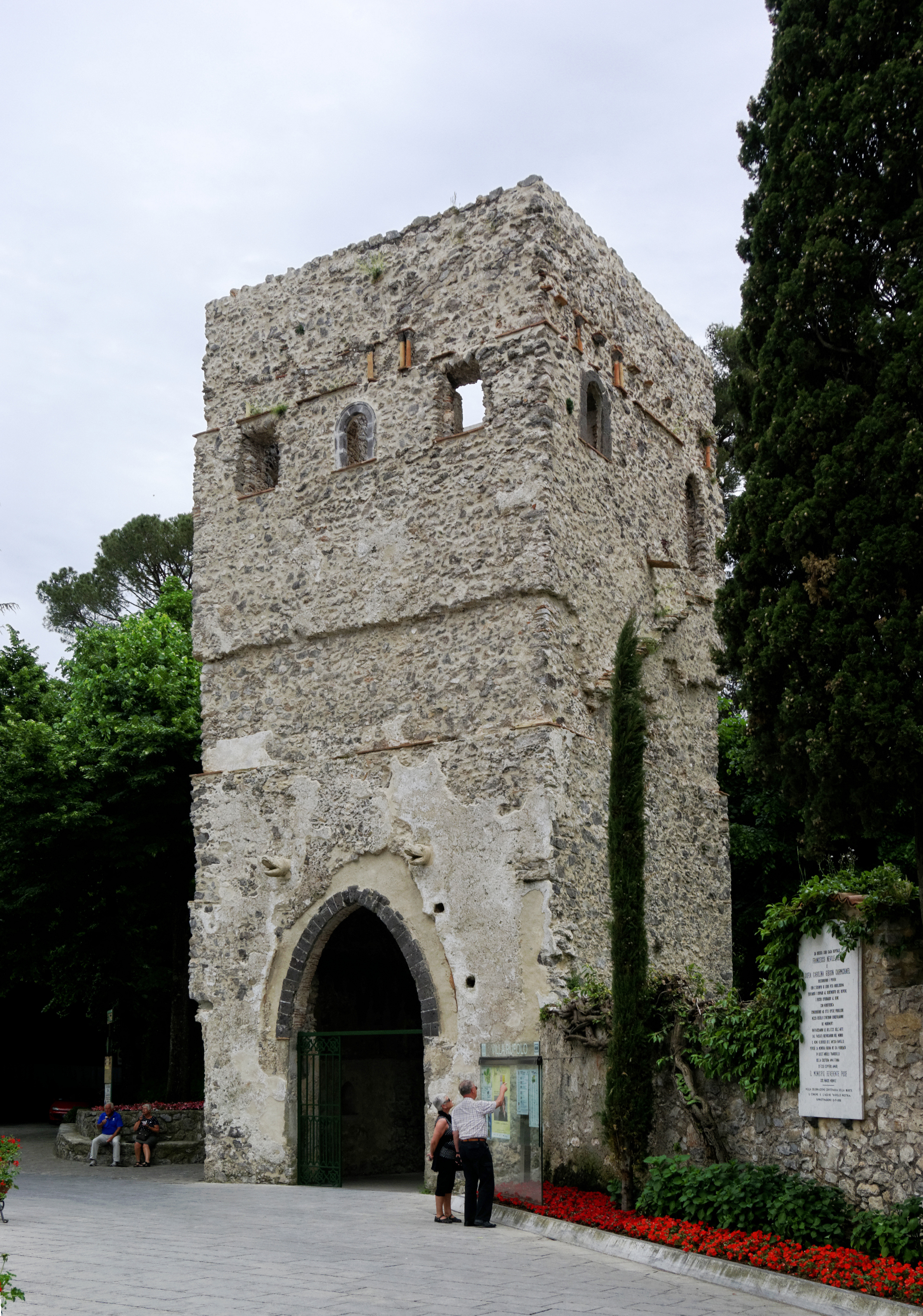
Entrance

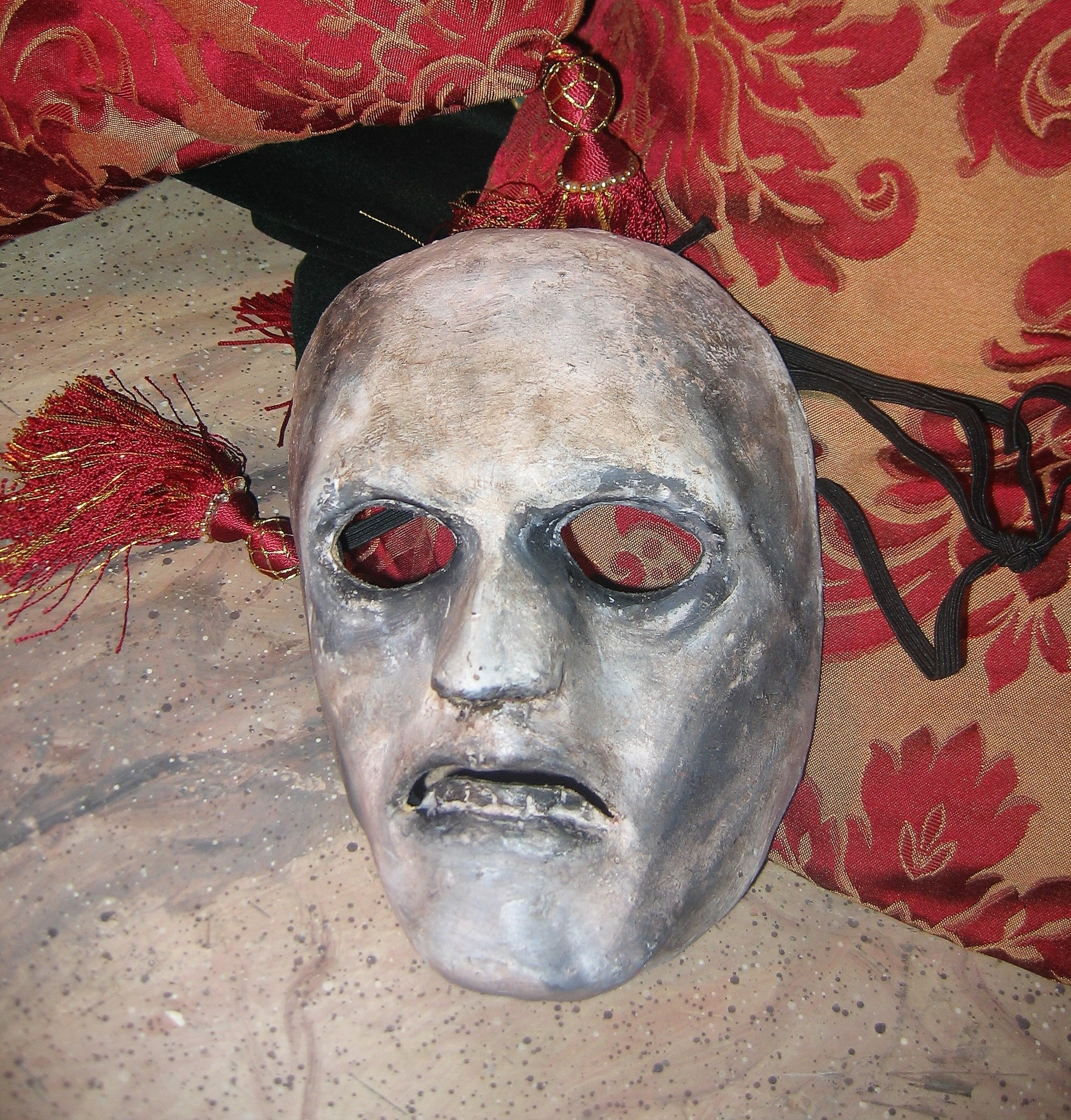
Mask in the small museum

== See also ==
- Amalfi Coast
- Ravello
- Villa Cimbrone
