= La Rondinaia =

Villa on the Amalfi Coast of Italy

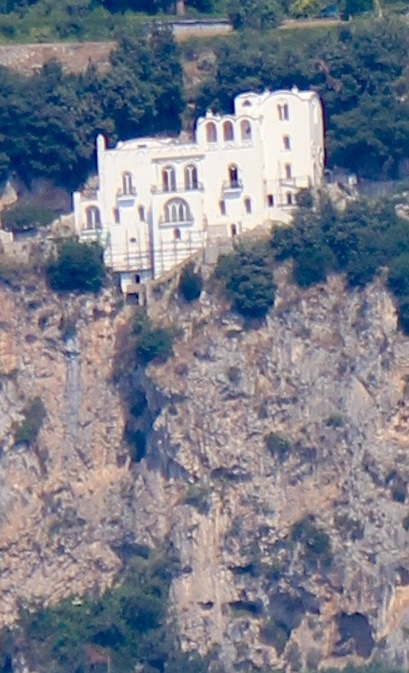
- View of La Rondinaia from the sea
- Interactive map of the La Rondinaia area

General information
- Coordinates: 40°38′34″N 14°36′40″E

La Rondinaia is a villa in Ravello on the Amalfi Coast in southern Italy. The property was owned by American writer Gore Vidal from 1972 to 2006.

== History ==
Initially, the property was part of the Villa Cimbrone, owned by Ernest Beckett, 2nd Baron Grimthorpe. His daughter Lucy had La Rondinaia built around 1930 and began living there. It is built on the edge of a cliff, hence its name "The swallows nest" (rondine means swallow in Italian). It has six floors and is 600 square metres (6,500 sq ft) in size. The surrounding garden is 4 hectares (9.9 acres).

=== Residence of Gore Vidal ===
La Rondinaia was purchased by American writer Gore Vidal in 1972. Vidal's longtime companion Howard Austen found the villa through a classified ad in Rome's Il Messaggero. It had four bedrooms, a sauna, a fitness center, and servant quarters. Vidal added a pool to the property in 1984.

Critic David Cunningham referred to La Rondinaia as "perhaps the last great author's home/artistic salon". Vidal hosted many notable guests, including Paul Newman, Greta Garbo, Princess Margaret, Mick Jagger, Bianca Jagger, Andy Warhol, Jed Johnson, Bruce Springsteen, Tennessee Williams, Italo Calvino, and Hillary Clinton. After Austen died in 2003, and due to his failing health, Vidal posted it for sale around 2004 for around €14,000,000. It was eventually sold to Vincenzo Palumbo, a local hotelier, in 2006.

=== Later history ===
In 2015, Palumbo offered the property for sale at £20,000,000. The villa can now be rented.

== In popular culture ==
The villa was one location for the 2004 movie The Life Aquatic with Steve Zissou.

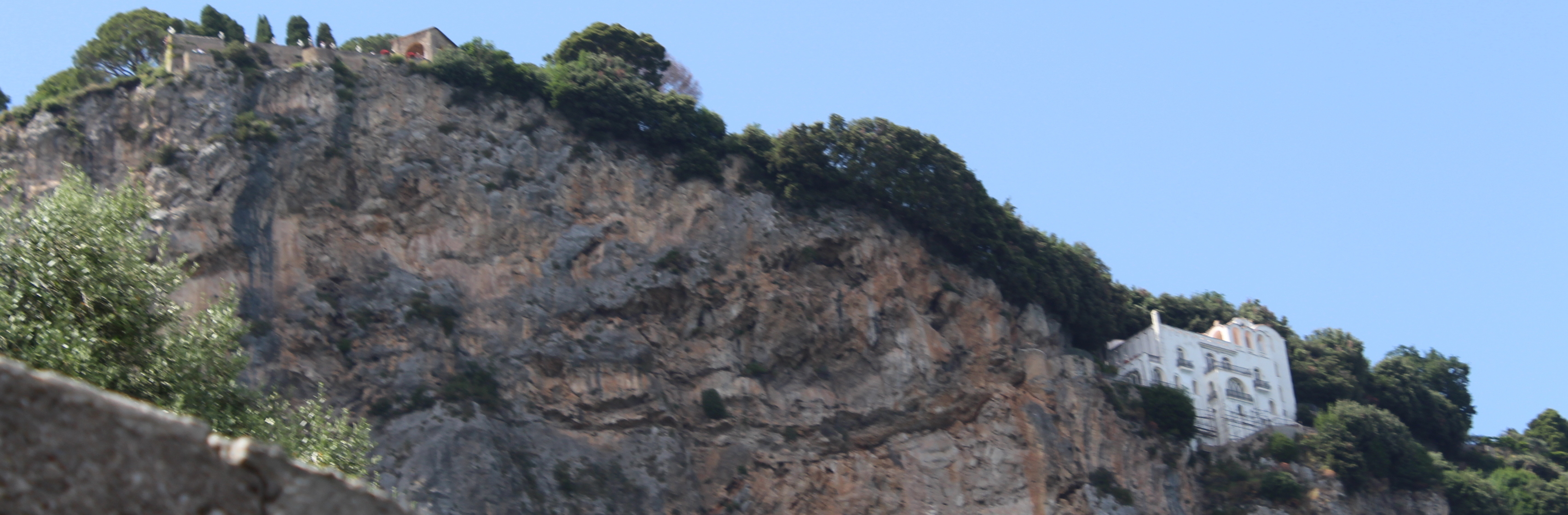
La Rondinaia to the right. At the upper left can be seen the wall and statuary of Terraza Infinito, a panoramic viewpoint, part of the Villa Cimbrone.
