= L.C. Beckett =

English philosopher

Lucille Catherine Beckett (pen name, L.C. Beckett; 1884–1979) was an English philosopher and scientist who explored connections between quantum physics and Eastern mysticism and philosophy, just as Fritjof Capra later would in his best-seller The Tao of Physics (1975). Unbounded Worlds (1959) and Neti Neti (1955) were her best-known works, but she also published Everyman and the Infinite (1922), The World Breath (1935), Movement and Emptiness (1968) and Insight and Solitude (1973).

== Biography ==
From Kirkstall, Beckett was the daughter of Ernest Beckett, 2nd Baron Grimthorpe (1856–1917), "a man of swiftly changing enthusiasms [. . .] a dilettante, philanderer, gambler and opportunist. He changed his career, his interests and his mistresses quite regularly." Her mother was American, Lucy Tracy Lee (1865–1891).

In 1903, she married Count Czernin von und zu Chudenitz (1875–1962), the Austro-Hungarian Minister to Bulgaria. They had four sons. When they divorced in 1914, she retained custody only of the youngest, Manfred (1913–1962).

During the First World War, she worked firstly for the British Ambassador in Rome and then for the American Red Cross.

After divorcing Count Czernin, she lived at the house in Ravello, Italy – Villa Cimbrone – that she inherited from her father. In 1921, Communists in Viterbo fired at her car, mistaking its occupants for fascists. Her fifteen-year-old son Jaromir was killed and son Paul and chauffeur Enrico were badly injured. Despite this, she asked that mercy be shown to the perpetrators.

Beckett mixed with some of the foremost artists and scientists of her time. At the Villa Cimbrone, she was visited by, among others E.M. Forster, D.H. Lawrence and Greta Garbo. An additional attraction at the Villa Cimbrone was the cliffside 6-floor house, La Rondinaia (the swallow's nest), that she built in its grounds in 1930. She was a friend and patron of the artist Ceri Richards, with whom she discussed artistic inspiration. He is known to have presented her with one of four hand illustrated copies of The Collected Poems of Dylan Thomas. She in turn presented one of Richards' paintings to Carl Jung. Of natural scientists she particularly admired Fred Hoyle and Sir Arthur Eddington (to whom she dedicated The World Breath (1935)). Her thoughts developed and were refined in the light of new scientific discoveries. In the fields of psychology and religious studies she frequently references Carl Jung, Krishnamurti and Christmas Humphries – all of whom she knew personally. In 1926 she married Captain Oliver Harry Frost (thereby becoming the Honourable Lucille Frost). They divorced in 1941. At various times, she also lived on Dartmoor and in Chelsea. In 1972 she sold La Rondinaia to Gore Vidal and moved to Lisbon where she died in 1979. Gore Vidal claimed that her spirit permeated La Rondinaia.

== Works ==
=== Everyman and the Infinite, London: L.N Fowler & Co. 1923. ===
"When so many writers of today feed vulture-like on the offal of the soul, it is well to turn to a book like this which through the finite imaginatively evokes the infinite" – Daily Telegraph

=== The World Breath, London: Rider & Co. 1935. ===
"The author explains (and what erudition has gone towards that explanation!) how the universe, mankind, sciences, religions, the atom and nebulae, all operate in waves and respond to the Law of Periodicity" – Manchester Evening News

=== Gremlins (1948, unfinished) ===
In 1948, Beckett was planning to write a book about the psychology of airmen but this project seems not to have been completed. She was particularly interested in their stories about gremlins. These stories abounded in the RAF in the Second World War; her son Manfred had been an RAF fighter pilot and SOE agent (his story is told in Double Mission by Norman Franks).

=== Neti Neti (Not This Not That), Marazion, Cornwall, UK: The Ark Press 1955 ===
This book, in which the author attempts to develop a new conception of religion, is believed to have influenced the composer John Cage. The title, Neti Neti, is a reference to the Upanishads.

=== Unbounded Worlds, Marazion, Cornwall, UK: The Ark Press 1959 ===
In this book, dedicated to her grandson, Nicholas, the topic is infinity and causation.

=== Movement and Emptiness, London: Stuart (Vincent) & J.M. Watkins Ltd. 1968 ===
- "How modern scientific discovery in the field of astro-physics leads back to the one fundamental fact of 'unborn, unoriginated, unformed', which the Buddha recognised" (flyleaf).

=== Insight of Solitude London: Robinson & Watkins Ltd. 1973 ===
- "I am firmly convinced that the Buddha taught what is being rediscovered in our time by the most eminent scientists." (foreword)
