= Ravello =

- Comune
- Comune di Ravello
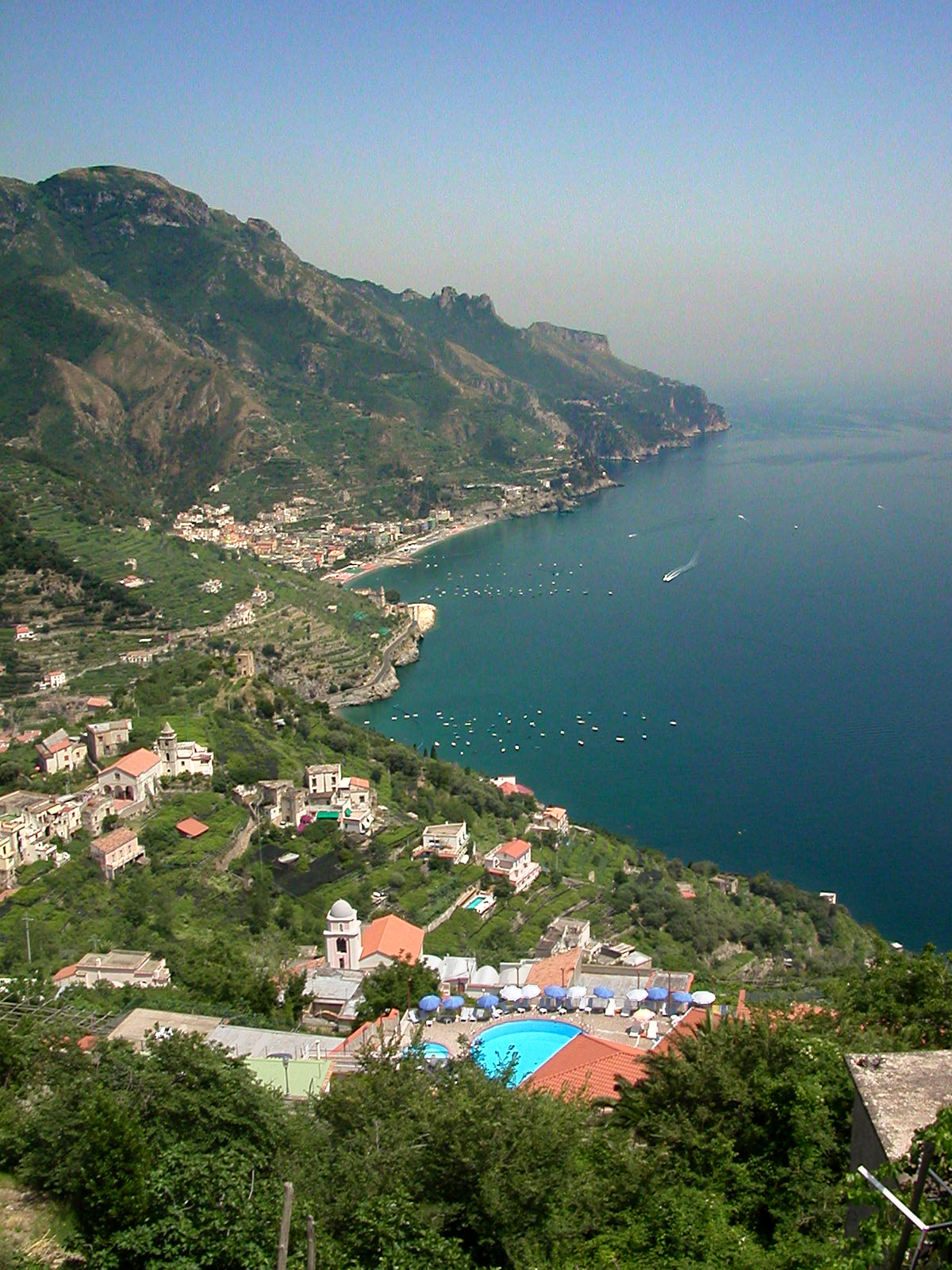
- Amalfi Coast looking south from Ravello

- Coat of arms

- Location within Italy Location within Campania
- Coordinates: 40°39′N 14°37′E
- Country: Italy
- Region: Campania
- Province: Salerno (SA)
- Frazioni: Sambuco, Torello, Castiglione, Marmorata, San Cosma, San Pietro alla Costa, Monte, Casa Bianca

Government
  - Mayor: Paolo Vuilleumier

Area
  - Total: 7.94 km^{2} (3.07 sq mi)
- Elevation: 350 m (1,150 ft)

Population (31 December 2014)
  - Total: 2,500
  - Density: 310/km^{2} (820/sq mi)
- Demonym: Ravellesi
- Time zone: UTC+1 (CET)
  - Summer (DST): UTC+2 (CEST)
- Postal code: 84010
- Dialing code: 089
- Patron saint: St. Pantaleon
- Saint day: July 27
- Website: Official website

UNESCO World Heritage Site
- Part of: Costiera Amalfitana
- Criteria: Cultural: (ii)(iv)
- Reference: 830
- Inscription: 1997 (21st Session)
- Area: 11,206 ha (27,690 acres)
- Buffer zone: 11,857 ha (29,300 acres)

Ravello (Campanian: Raviello, Reviello) is a comune (municipality) situated above the Amalfi Coast (exactly 782 stairs above the town of Atrani), in the province of Salerno, Campania, Italy, with approximately 2,500 inhabitants. Its scenic location makes it a popular tourist destination, and earned it a listing as a UNESCO World Heritage Site in 1997.

== History ==
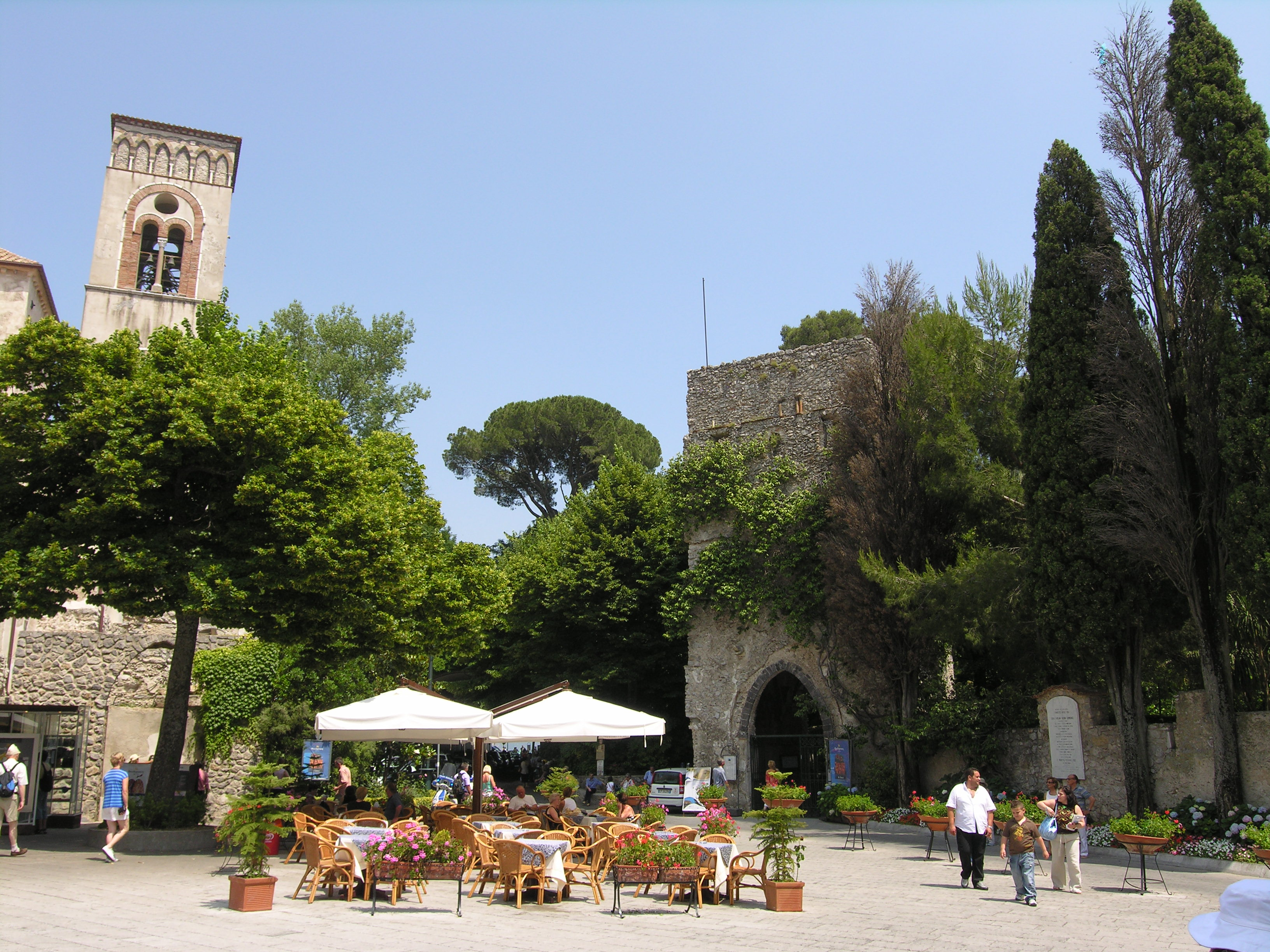
Piazza with Villa Ruffolo's entry tower

Ravello was founded in the 5th century as a shelter place against the barbarian invasions which marked the end of the Western Roman Empire.

In the 9th century Ravello was an important town of the maritime Republic of Amalfi.

It was a producer of wool from its surrounding country that was dyed in the town and an important trading power in the Mediterranean between 839 and around 1200.

In 1086, at the request of the Italo-Norman count Roger Borsa, who wished to create a counterweight to the powerful Duchy of Amalfi, Pope Victor III made Ravello the seat of a diocese immediately subject to the Holy See, with territory split off from that of the archdiocese of Amalfi. Early on, the bishops of Ravello all came from patrician families of the city, showing the church's municipalized character.

In the 12th century, Ravello had some 25,000 inhabitants, and it retains a number of palazzi of the mercantile nobility, the Rufolo, d'Aflitto, Confalone, and Della Marra.

In 1137, after a first failed attack two years before, the Duchy was destroyed by the Republic of Pisa. After this, a demographic and economic decline set in, and much of its population moved to Naples and its surroundings in the Kingdom of Naples.

In 1944 during WW2, the king of Italy lived in Ravello—at the "Palazzo Priscopio"—while waiting to go back to Rome

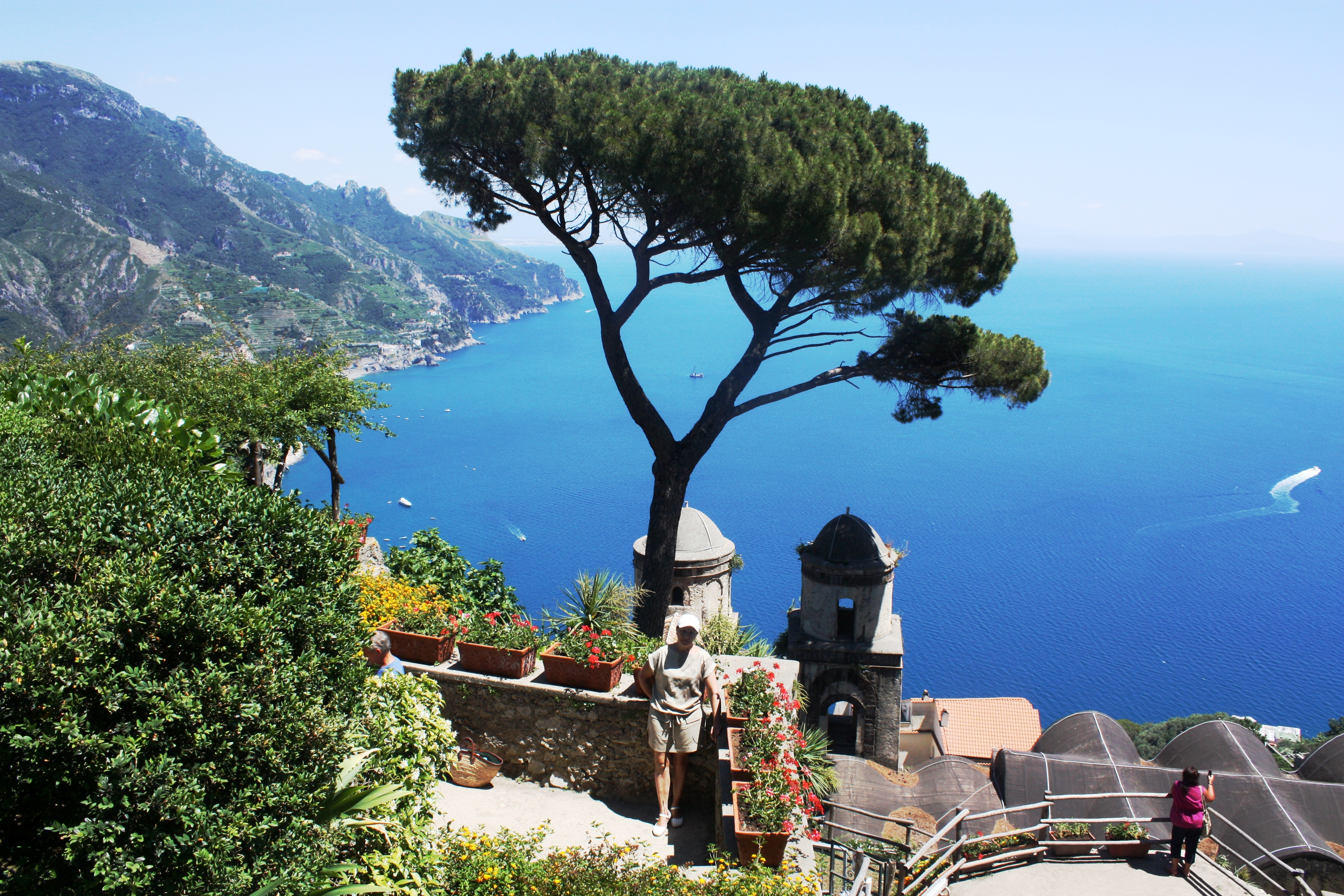
View of Amalfi Coast from Ravello

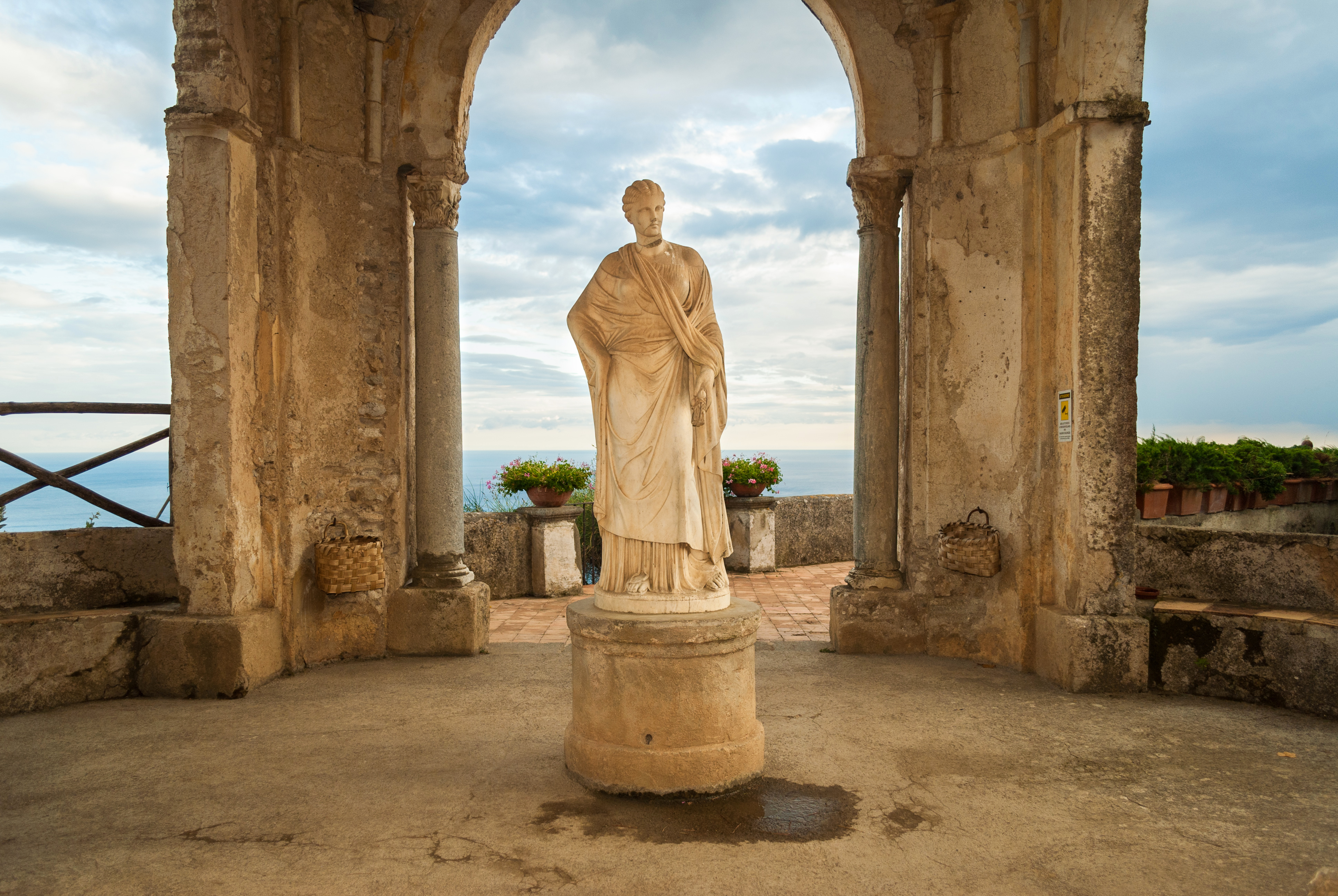
Garden terrace at Villa Cimbrone

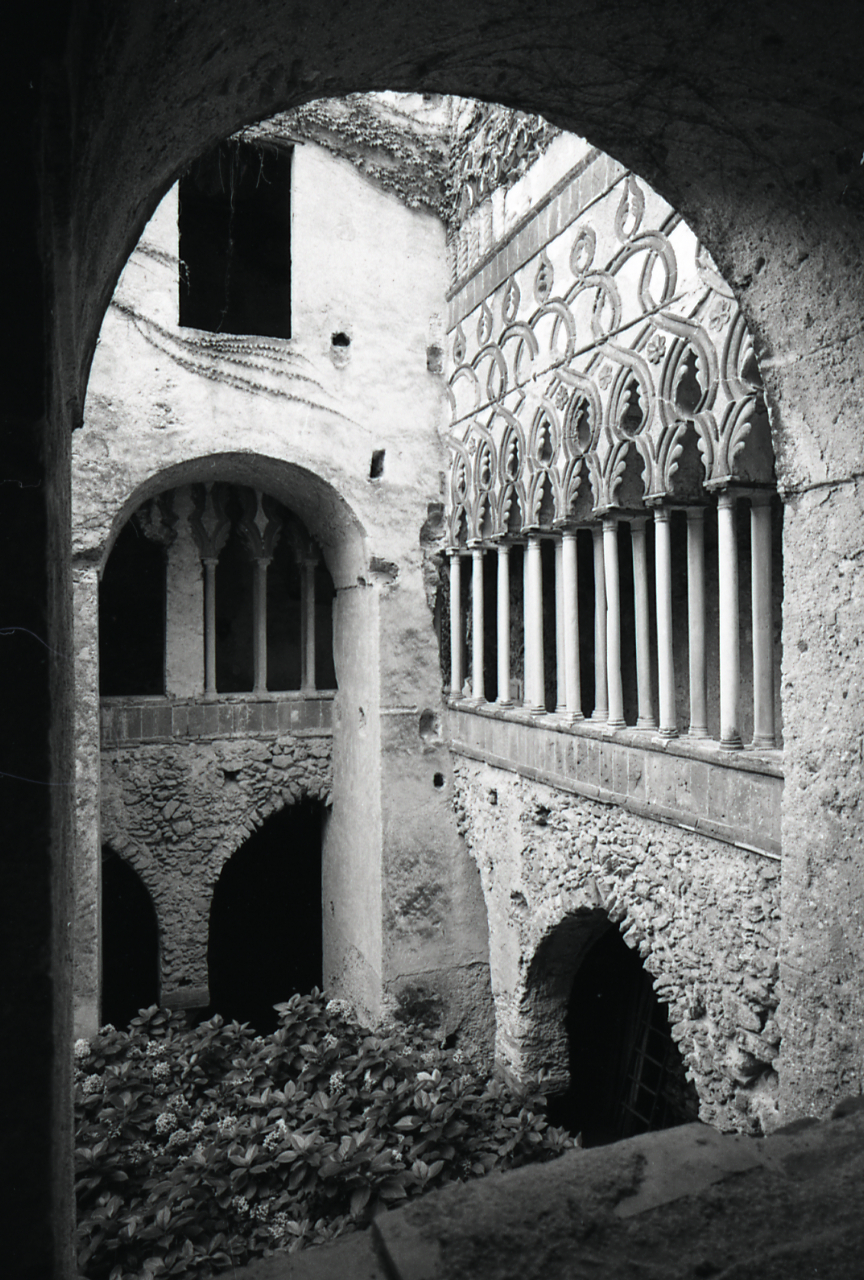
Gothic Cloister at Villa Rufolo

== Main sights ==
- The Duomo di Ravello (Cathedral of Ravello): the central nave contains the "Pulpit of the Gospels", on the right of the central nave, created in 1272 by Nicolò di Bartolomeo from Foggia.
- Villa Rufolo (1270), built by Nicola Rufolo, one of the richest Patricians of Ravello, on a ledge and it has become a famous attraction for thousands of visitors. The villa was mentioned by Giovanni Boccaccio in his Decameron and it is the place where Richard Wagner in 1880 was inspired for the stage design of his opera Parsifal.
- Villa Cimbrone, known for its "Terrace of the Infinite".
- The church of San Giovanni del Toro (named for John the Apostle and for "Il Toro", the former name of the old aristocratic quarter in which it was built) dating to before the year 1000. The church contains the Bove pulpit, dateable to 1200–1230, incorporated as mosaic fragments Raqqa bacini.
- The small church of Santa Maria a Gradillo (11th century). It has a basilica plan, with an apse and two aisles.
- Sanctuary of Sts. Cosmas and Damian (14th century)
- La Rondinaia (The Swallow's Nest), built in the 1930s on a cliff face, the villa was the Italian residence of Gore Vidal until 2004.

== Culture ==
The town has served historically as a destination for artists, musicians, and writers, including Giovanni Boccaccio, Richard Wagner, Edvard Grieg, M. C. Escher, Virginia Woolf, Greta Garbo, Gore Vidal, André Gide, Joan Miró, Truman Capote, Tennessee Williams, Graham Greene, Jacqueline Kennedy, Leonard Bernstein and Sara Teasdale (who mentioned it in her prefatory dedication in Love Songs).

Every year in the summer months, the "Ravello Festival" takes place. It began in 1953 in honour of Richard Wagner.

The 1953 film Beat the Devil, directed by John Huston and starring Humphrey Bogart, Jennifer Jones, and Gina Lollobrigida in her English language debut, was shot in Ravello. An extended scene of Bogart and Jones romancing was filmed on the Terrazza dell'lnfinito at the Villa Cimbrone.

== Transportation ==
Ravello can be reached from the 163 Amalfitana State Road by private car. The town centre is also served by the 511006 bus.

== See also ==
- Amalfi Coast
- Sorrentine Peninsula
- Villa Cimbrone
- Villa Rufolo
