= Bell tower of the Gaeta Cathedral =

Bell tower in Gaeta, Italy

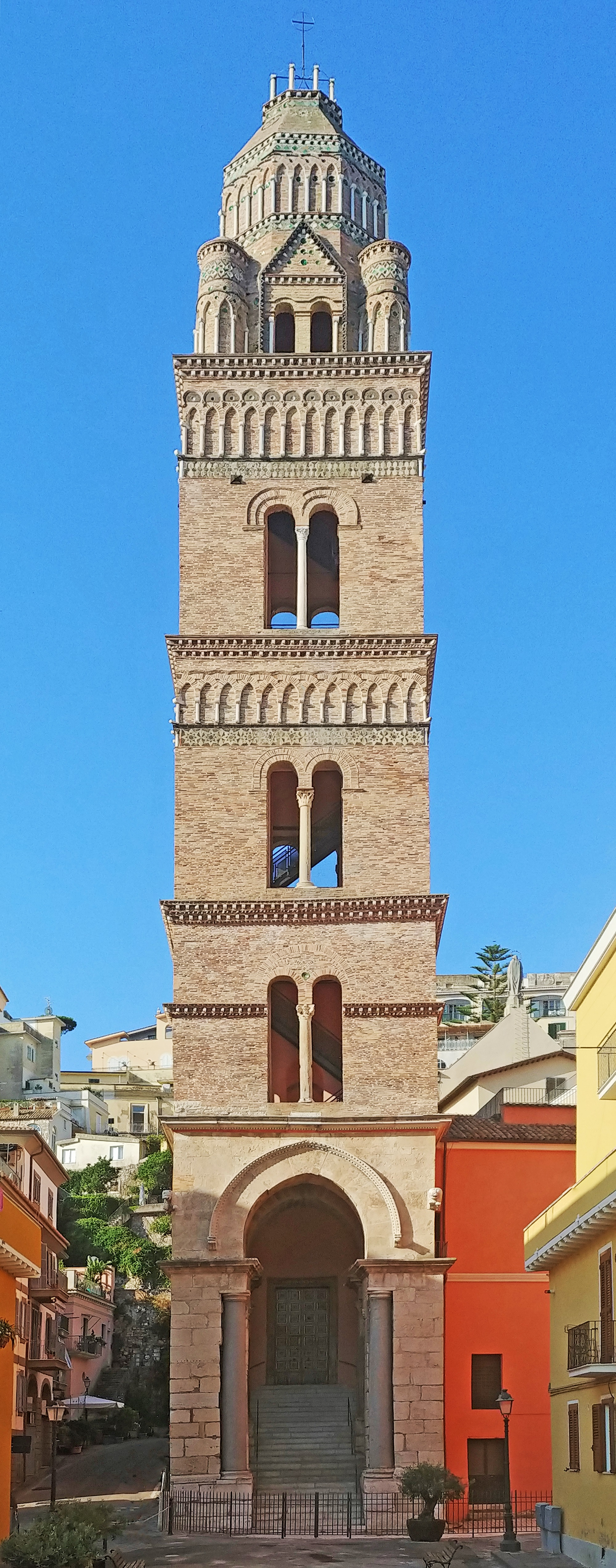
- The northern facade of the bell tower

- Location within Italy

General information
- Architectural style: Romanesque
- Location: Gaeta, Lazio, Italy
- Coordinates: 41°12′32″N 13°35′14″E
- Year built: 1148-1272

Height
- Height: 57 meters

Technical details
- Floor count: 4

Design and construction
- Architect: Nicolangelus Romanus

The bell tower of Gaeta Cathedral is located behind the building, in Pope Gelasius Square, overlooking the Gulf of Gaeta. Built in the Romanesque style with strong Arab-Norman influence, it is 57 meters high, was built beginning in 1148 and was completed in 1279 with the construction of the apex tower.

== History ==
When, between the end of the 8th century and the 9th, the bishopric of Formia was permanently moved to Gaeta, the ancient church of Santa Maria del Parco was elevated to the rank of cathedral and, beginning in 842, housed the relics of the patron St. Erasmus, which until then had been at the Formian cathedral, which was demoted to the rank of a simple church. Beginning with the reign of the hypati John I (867-933) and his son Docibilis II (933-954), the church of Santa Maria del Parco was enlarged, and again after 978, to be finally consecrated on January 22, 1006, by Pope Paschal II. The building had taken on a basilican shape with three naves (of which the left one, the oldest, had an irregular trapezoidal plan) with orientation along the north-south axis (opposite to the present) and the entrance facing the gulf.

In 1148 a piece of land adjacent to the cathedral and facing the ancient forum (today's Piazza Cavallo) was donated by the monk of St. Erasmus in Formia, Pandolfo Palagrosio, to build a bell tower on it, as reported in a document in the Codex diplomaticus cajetanus:

Mense ianuarii 1148, Pandolphus Palagrosius, filius Domini Landulphi Magnifici, dat ecclesiae Cathedrali portionem ante Domum suam sitae, necessarium in opere campanarii et gradi eiusdem.
In January 1148, Pandolfo Palagrosio, son of Lord Landolfo the Magnificent, donated to the Cathedral a piece of land in front of his house, which was necessary for the construction of a bell tower and a staircase.

—Document CCCXL of the Codex diplomaticus cajetanus.

The same year the construction of a large bell tower would begin from the massive basement, for which blocks from the marble facing of the mausoleum of Lucius Sempronius Atratinus were used. The base was conceived hollow on the inside, so that it could form the monumental access to the cathedral behind, a function it fulfilled until the reconstruction following the June 1213 earthquake, as part of which the orientation of the church was reversed.

The architect of the belfry was magister Nicolangelus Romanus, also known as Nicola d'Angelo or more properly as Angelo di Nicola, whose name is recorded in an inscription on the keystone of the ogival arch placed between the two inner bays of the basement. He belonged to a well-known family of Roman marble workers, whose progenitor was Paulus vir Magnus, active in the 13th century in Lazio and also in Rome, where Nicola d'Angelo, with whom Gaeta's Nicolangelus is hypothetically identifiable, collaborated with Pietro Vassalletto in the making of the Easter candle column in the basilica of St. Paul Outside the Walls.

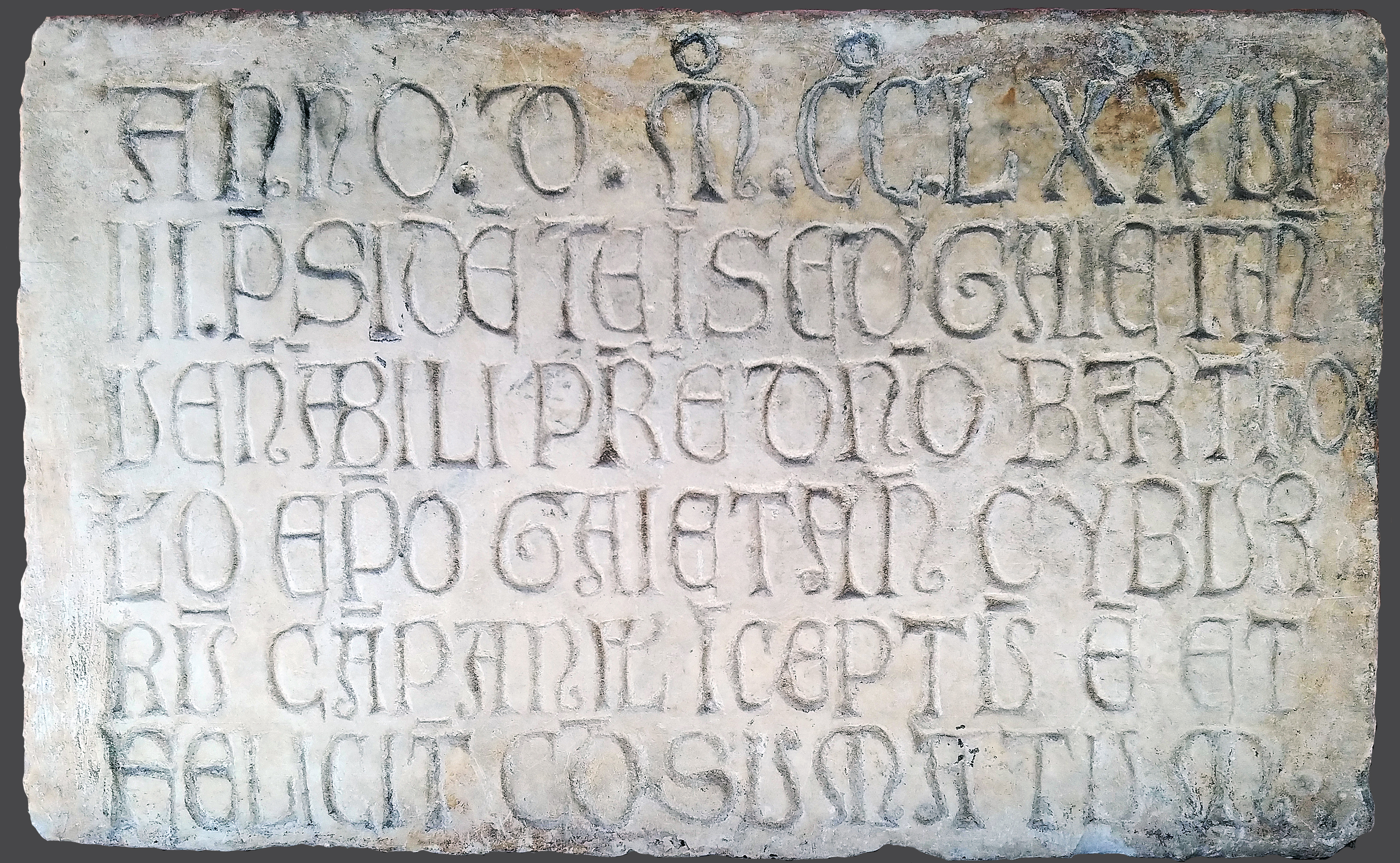
The 1279 plaque commemorating the completion of the bell tower.

The construction of the bell tower continued throughout the second half of the 12th century and was completed in 1174; It was not until 1279, with Bartolomeo Maltacea being bishop of Gaeta, that the apex crowning tower was built and completed within the same year, as recorded in a plaque in Latin currently displayed inside the tower and originally placed at the entrance to the tower:

ANNO•D(omini) M•CCLXXIX

III•P̄(rae)SIDENTE I(n) SED(e) GAIETAN(a)
VEN̄(e)RABILI P(at)R̄E D(omi)NŌ BARTHO
LO EP̄(iscop)O GAIETAN(o) CYBUR
RŪ(m) CĀ(m)PANILI ICEPTŪ(m) Ē(st) ET

FELICIT̄(er) CŌ(n)sumatum.
In the year of our Lord 1279, the venerable father Bartolomeo, Bishop of Gaeta, who was in charge of the Gaeta See, began to build the tiburium of the bell tower and happily completed it.

—1279 inscription.

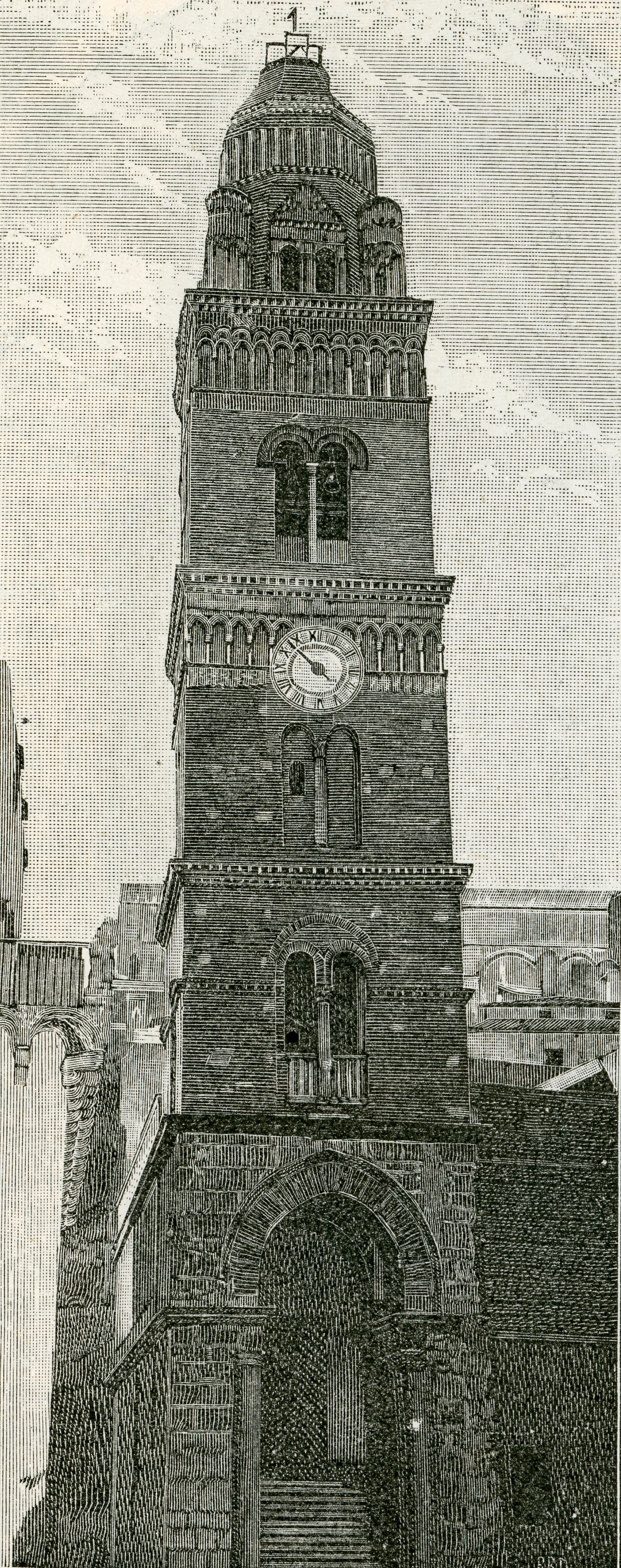
The bell tower in an 1898 engraving, showing the marble face of the northern clock.

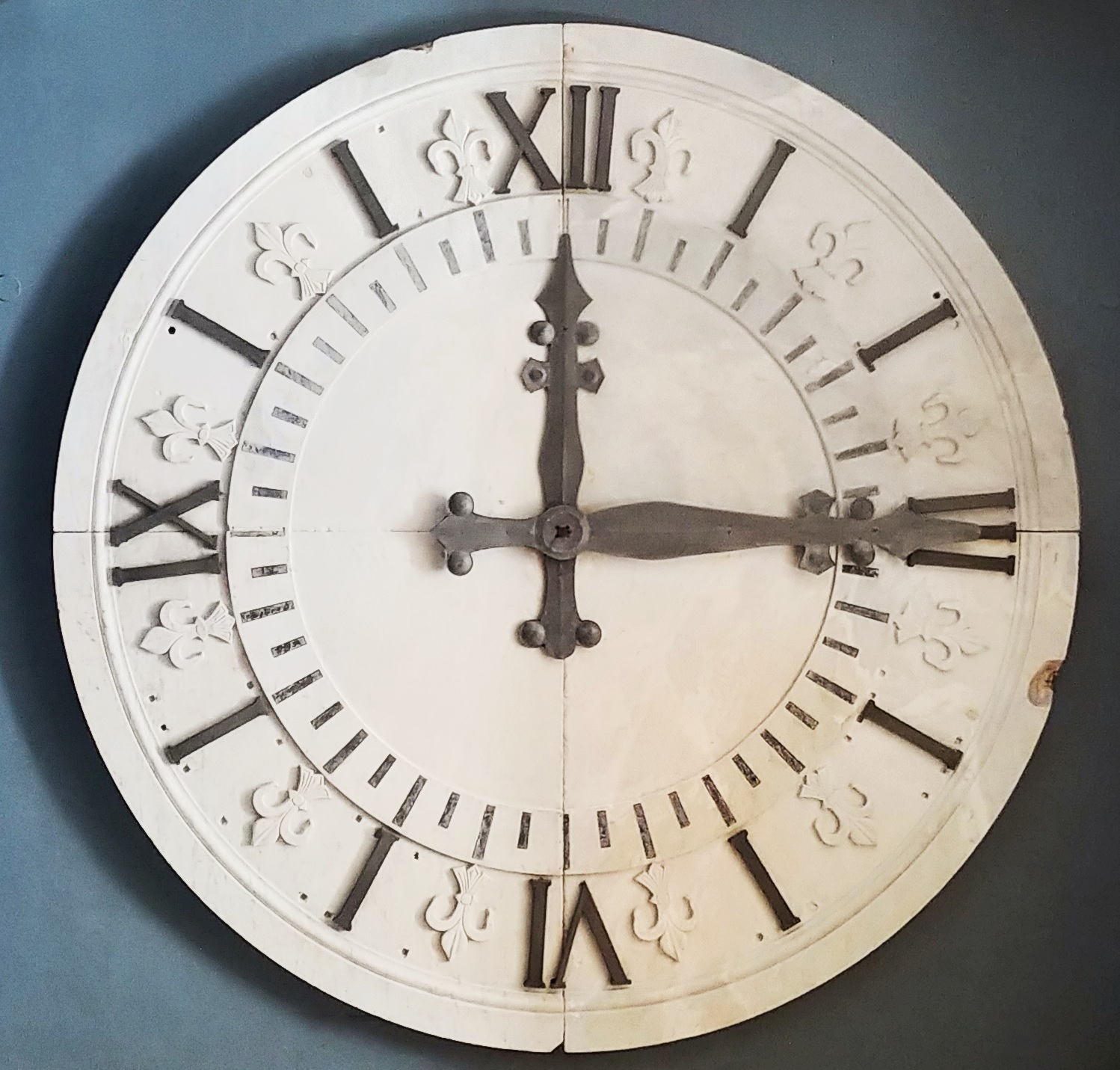
The marble dial of the northern clock by Domenico Antonio Vaccaro (1711), currently in the Diocesan Museum of Religiousness of the Aurunci Mountains Park in Gaeta.

Subsequently, the bell tower did not undergo substantial changes. In the 15th century two Roman sarcophagi and elements of the cathedral's ancient ambon were placed along the side walls of the basement. In 1532-1533 there was already a clock on the eastern facade, in the order immediately below the small tower, probably dating from the beginning of the same century; it was replaced in 1578 by another one by Nicandro Marotta. In 1646 Francesco Marotta made a new clock, with a polychrome tile face designed by Dionisio Lazzari; a second clock was installed by Matteo De Vivo in 1711 on the northern facade, with a marble face by Domenico Antonio Vaccaro. In the 19th century the mechanism of the first one was removed, although its dial remained in place, and later the latter as well.

In the second half of the 20th century the tower underwent major restoration work twice. The first was in the years 1958-1963 under the direction of architect Raffaele Perrotti: in the first phase there were works of static consolidation, with the installation of a widespread chaining system using steel bars and the construction of new internal reinforced concrete floors; the second phase involved the external decorative apparatus, which included the removal of the face of the seventeenth-century clock, and the total reopening of all the mullioned windows, with the liberation of the related columns from support pillars, where present, within which they had been caged. During the restorations in the 1990s, aimed at preserving the original decorative apparatus of the bell tower, the eighteenth-century clock face was also removed (later permanently displayed at the Diocesan and Religious Museum of the Park of the Aurunci Mountains in Gaeta), although the clock with hands and numbers remained initially installed.

In June 2016, the bell tower and the area in front of it were fenced off with a wrought-iron gate. In 2019-2020, a major structural consolidation and restoration work was carried out on the entire tower, also aimed at making it usable and open to visitors, under the direction of Alessandro Catani; during this, among other things, the internal metal stairs connecting the various floors were redone and the surviving elements of the northern clock were removed; the inaugural ceremony was held on August 12, 2020.

== Description ==
=== Location ===
The bell tower is located at the northeastern corner of the Cathedral of Saints Erasmus and Marcianus and Saint Mary of the Assumption in Gaeta, between the apse (and the underlying crypt) and the last chapel on the right, which is twice as deep as the others. The northern (main) façade faces Pope Gelasius Square and faces the sea, while the western façade faces Cavallo Square, the ancient forum.

Leaning against the apse and to the right of the bell tower is a structure in which two biforas and a neo-Romanesque trifora are located, mistakenly identified as the bell tower of the ancient baptistery of San Giovanni in Fonte, actually conceived and originally used as a staircase tower for the 17th-century Baroque choir loft behind, demolished in 1788.

=== The basement ===
The high basement is in the shape of a parallelepiped and is made largely with material from the mausoleum of Lucius Sempronius Atratinus, a Roman consul who committed suicide in 20 B.C., located in a prominent position over the Borgo of Gaeta. It rises 15 meters above the ground and each of its sides measures 9 meters wide.

The walls of the basement were adorned in the 15th century with frescoes, still present in a poor state in the 19th century, visible in the painting Gaeta S. Erasmo by Giacinto Gigante (c. 1848), in which the upper part of the figure of a saint can be seen on the outer pillar to the right of the ogival archway of the northern facade.

==== Epigraphs ====
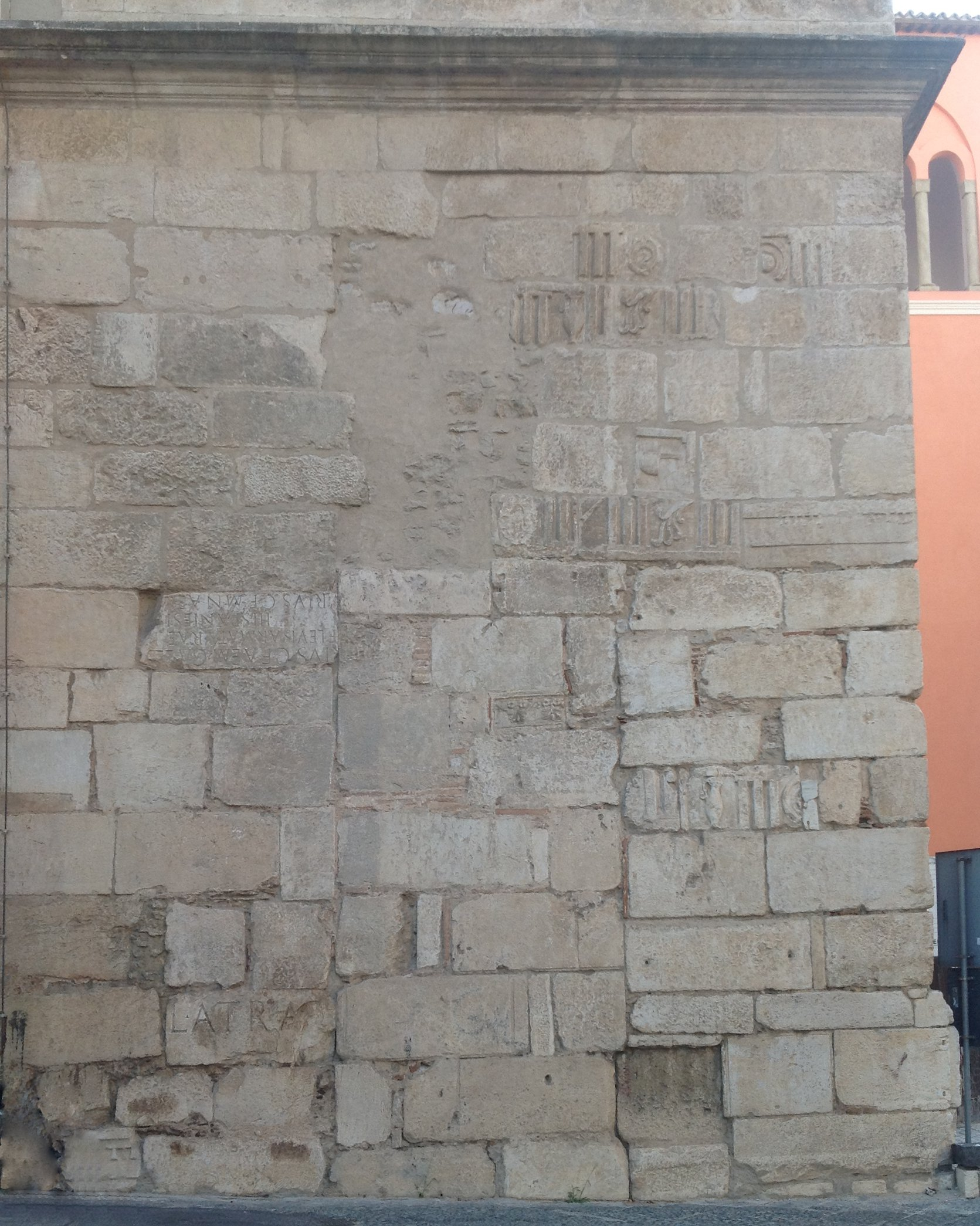
The eastern side of the basement, with metopes and triglyphs and the four Roman inscriptions.

Among the stone blocks there are some decorated in bas-relief with metopes and triglyphs (particularly on the lower left of the northern façade and on the upper right of the eastern façade) and several inscriptions in Latin. Along the left side there are two: the first, on the lower left, reads:

L(ucius)•ATRA[tinus]

This epigraph gave rise to some fanciful suppositions, including that, according to the ninth book of the Metamorphoses of Publius Ovidius Naso, which tells of the god Mercury divining through the barking of Anubis, the basement had originated in pagan times as a temple dedicated to the deity.

Higher up, on an axis with this one, is another inscription, more extensive and placed upside down. The text extends over four lines and is incomplete at both ends; it is of a funerary nature and refers to two soldiers, Gaius Furius Aemilius Gallus, son of Gaius, and Gaius Furius Aemilius, son of Gaius and grandson of Marcus:

[C(aius)•Fu]RIVS•C(ai)•F(ilius)•AEM(ilius)•GALLV[s ----------]
[prae]F(ectus)•LEVIS•ARMATURAE•PR[----------]
HISPANIENSIS
[C(aius)•F]VRIVS•C(ai)•F(ilius)•M(arci)•N(epos)•AEM(ilius)•[----------]

On the same side, in the upper part of the left quadrant, there are two other epigraphs; the one placed lower down, three rows above the previous one, refers to Lucius Munatius Plancus, who had a villa in Gaeta and who, upon his death (1 A.D.), was buried in the mausoleum erected in 22 B.C. on the summit of Mount Orlando:

[L(ucio)•Mun]ATIO•L(ucii)•F(ilio)•[Planco]
[Cretes(ium)•]GORTYNII•[patrono]

Just above it, there is another short inscription that refers to the Gens Ummidia:

[- - -] P(ublius?) Ummidi[us - - -]

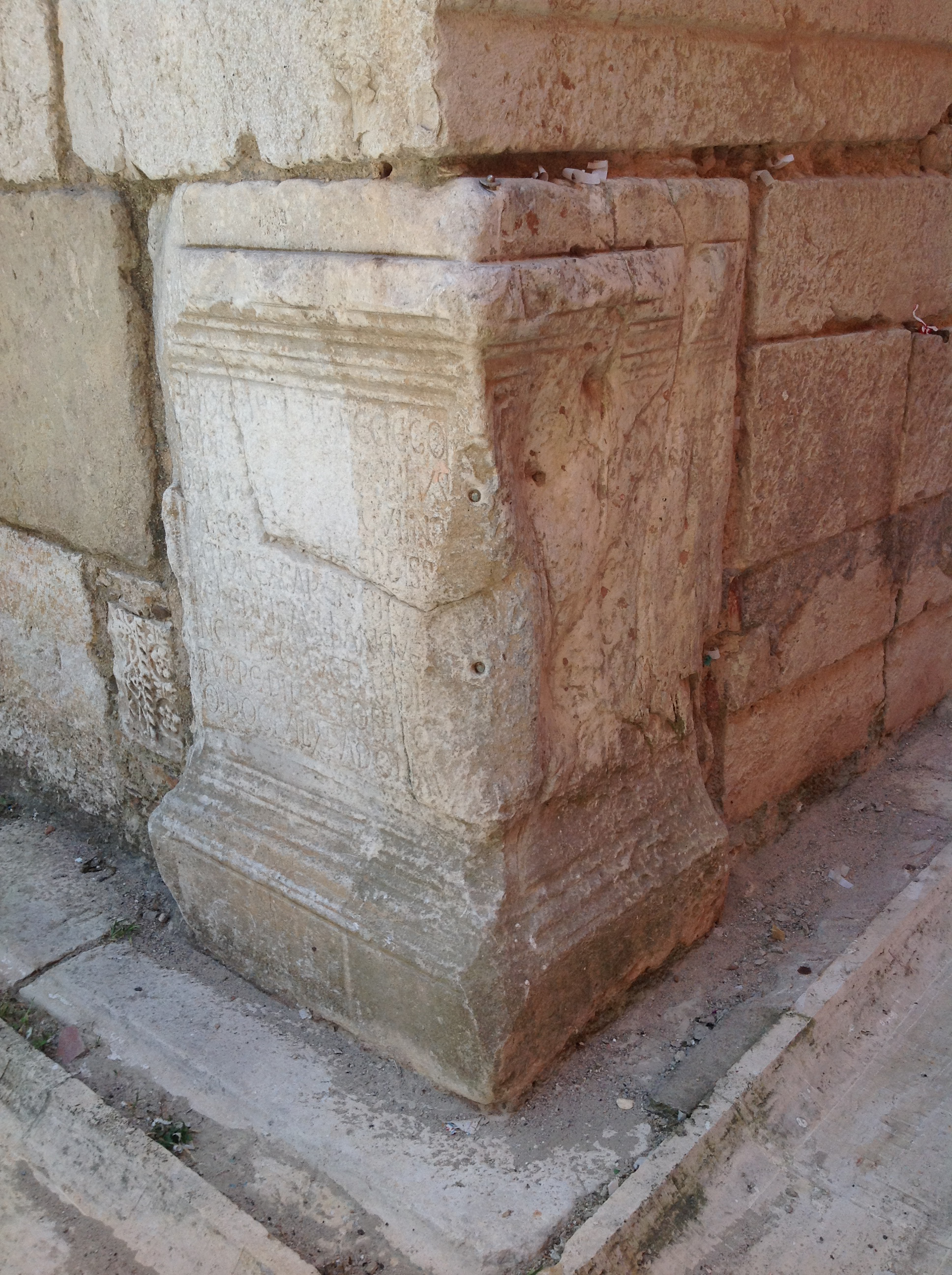
The 10th-century memorial stone, used as a cornerstone.

By contrast, the marble memorial stone located at the corner between the northern and eastern sides of the basement, with the epigraph facing north, is complete. The artifact, in the shape of an altar, comes from the land surrounding the turris Garilliani, built by Gaeta's hypatos John I on the left bank of the Garigliano River immediately after the victorious battle of 915 against the Saracens stationed there, which earned him the title imperialis patricius, found in the inscription. When, in the mid-12th century, various stone materials were collected for the construction of Gaeta's bell tower also in the area of Formia and Minturno, the memorial stone was also transported to Gaeta and used as a cornerstone, although the tower at the Garigliano was still in operation.

The text is as follows:

HOC EDIFICIV̄ FECI EGO

IOH̄ IMPERIALIS PATRICIVS FILIVS
DOM̄ DOCIVILIS YPATA QUI IN T
RAIECTO FLUMINE P DISSI
PATIONE AGARENORUM
REHEDEFICAVI HANC VERO
INCLUTA DOMV̄ ETIAMDIV
TVRRE DILEVTO FILIO ME

O DOCIVILI ȲP̄Ā DONAVI
It was I who built this building, John the Imperial Patrician, son of Lord Docibilis, an hypatos, who rebuilt this building near the river Traetto for the destruction of the Saracens. So I have given the whole of this dwelling and the tower as well to my beloved son, Docibilis, an hypatos.

—Text of the marble memorial stone and its translation.

Another epigraph, of a funerary nature and also referring to the Gens Ummidia, is found on a stone set in the pavement at the foot of the basement steps:

M(arcus)•MARIVS•C(ai)•F(ilius)
PAPVS•VIR

P(ublius)•VMMID[ius]•C(ai)
PATER•BES[iae]

==== Northern elevation ====
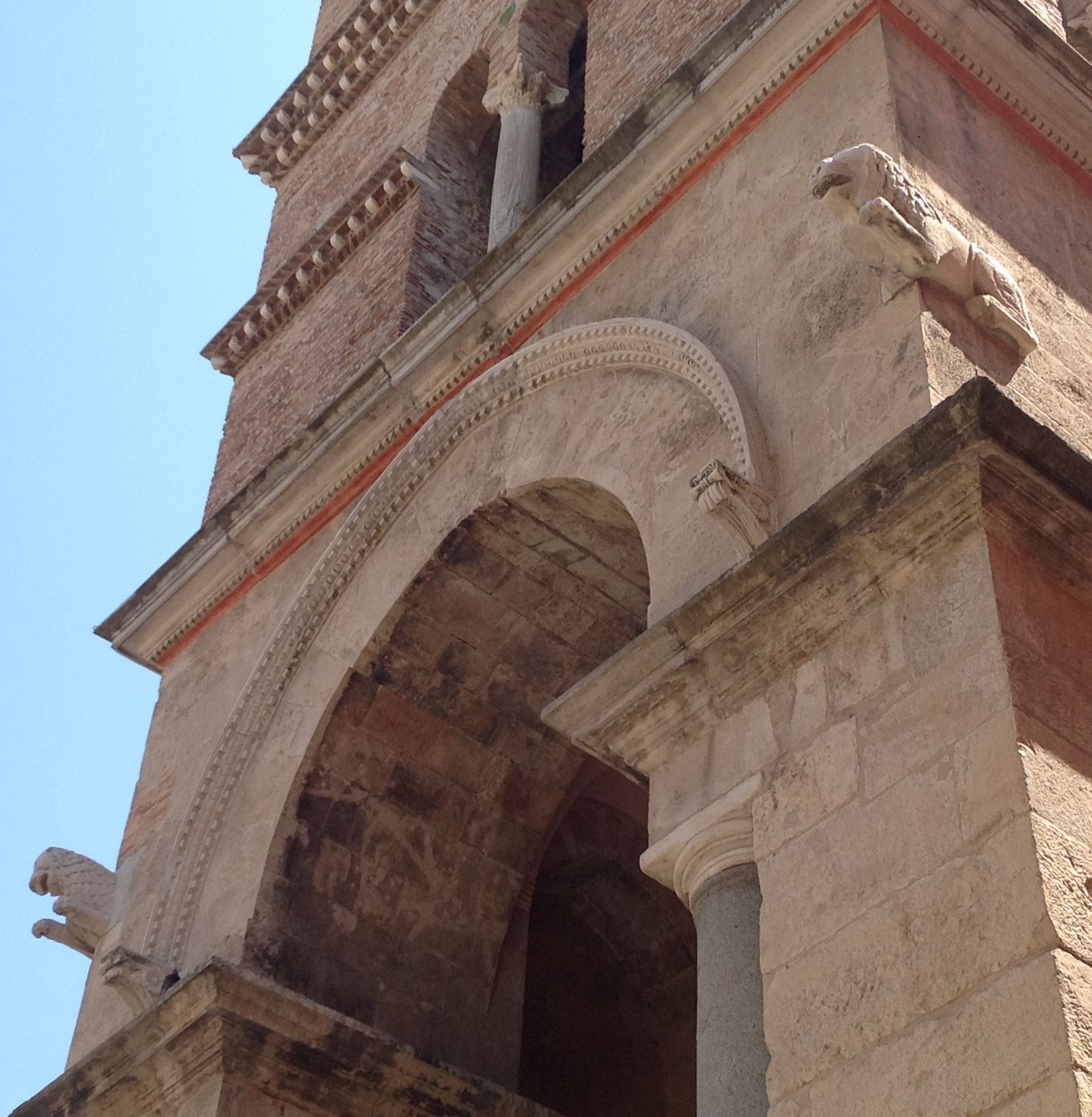
The ogival arch and the two lions.

The northern side of the bell tower's basement is characterized by the presence of a large pointed arch, which gives access to the staircase inside the basement; it rests on two pairs of smooth reclaimed columns made of Egyptian black granite (the outer one with a base reused as a capital and the inner one with a Corinthian marble capital), interspersed with a half-pillar. The shutter is located above the cornice that spans about two-thirds of the height of the base. The archivolt consists of a carved double-notched molding, at the base of which are placed two protruding marble corbels carved in bas-relief with leaves and rosettes. The archway in its form is of Islamic derivation and bears a strong analogy to the main archway of access to the prayer hall of the great mosque of Qayrawan, Tunisia, which is also ogival and supported by two pairs of columns.

In the two corners of the upper part of the basement, parallel to the two side facades and projecting northward, are two marble statues depicting as many reclining lions.

Due to the monumentality of the basement and a widespread misunderstanding of the inscription on the memorial stone of John I, the latter was long considered an independent monument from the cathedral, built at the behest of the hypatos after the victory of 915. Therefore, the structure would have originated as a celebratory monument (specifically a triumphal arch) that only later, in the 13th century, would have been repurposed as a bell tower with the construction of the brick tower above and connected to the church behind.

==== Interior and staircase ====
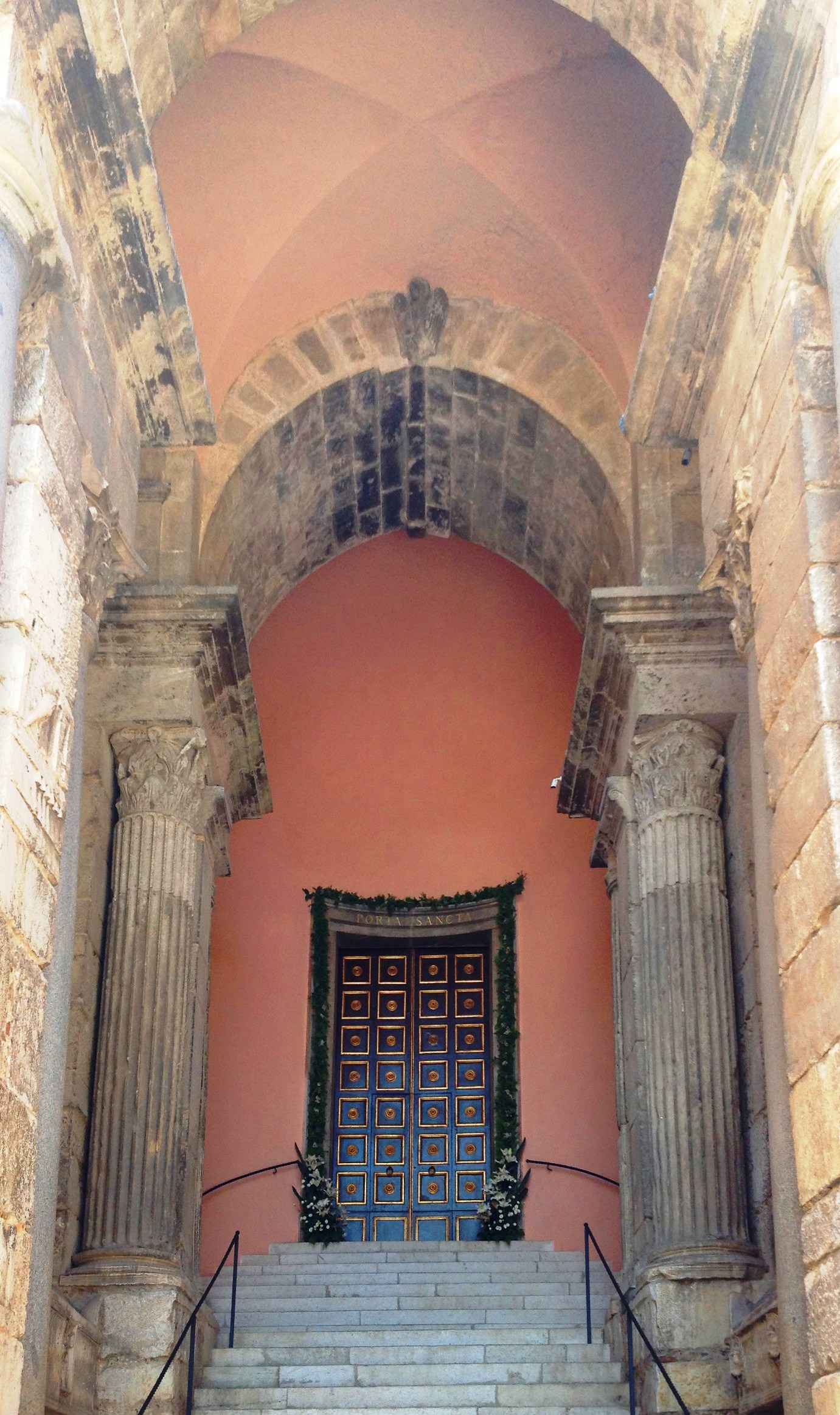
The interior of the basement

Internally, the basement is divided into a single, deep room that consists of two bays and is entirely occupied by the staircase leading to the cathedral. The latter was probably originally less long than the present one, and stood after the seventeenth step from the bottom, where a narrow landing is currently located; only later, with the construction of the large semicircular apse that closes the room constituting its second bay, would it acquire its present extension.

The first bay has a rectangular plan, covered with a cross vault without ribs. In the upper part of the right wall, above the cornice, there is an ogival single lancet window that gives light to the staircase behind for access to the second floor of the bell tower. This one, about 50 centimeters wide, is carved directly inside the stone blocks that make up the base of the bell tower and is interrupted in the middle by a cross-vaulted landing, while that of the ramps is barrel vaulted; the ceiling is decorated with some bas-reliefs, such as a crescent moon and rosettes.

At the top of the staircase, in the curved wall of the apse (whose basin, until the restorations of the third quarter of the 20th century, was decorated with stucco coffers) opens a wide portal, with a simple marble frame. This one, tracing the access of the 10th-11th century cathedral, is placed in axis with the so-called seventh nave, i.e., the easternmost aisle of the 13th-century building (with seven aisles), carved out by repurposing the left side aisle of the church consecrated by Pope Paschal II. The door opens in the terminal part of the left wall of the third right chapel of the cathedral, which lacks an altar, opposite the arched entrance to the seventh nave.

On the occasion of the Extraordinary Jubilee of Mercy, the portal was the holy door from December 13, 2015 to November 13, 2016; on the occasion of its opening, a stamp cancellation was made depicting the door.

The first bay is separated from the second by a deep ogival archway that recalls the one at the entrance to the staircase; it too is set on the cornice that runs both outside and inside the basement seamlessly. The arch is supported by two pairs of columns also interspersed with half-pillars made of stone blocks. Of each pair, the front column is fluted, with a Corinthian capital decorated with acanthus leaves; the rear column, on the other hand, is fluted, with a Doric capital.

===== Keystone of the inner arch =====
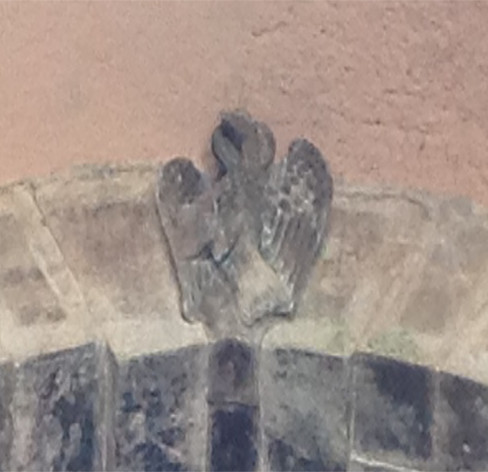
Keystone of the inner archway.

The keystone of the archway features, toward the north, a high-relief sculpture depicting the Eagle, symbol of the evangelist John; it holds open in its claws the book of the Gospel according to John, of which much of the first verse is inscribed in Latin:

IN PRIN

CIPIO E
RAT V
(er)BV(m)
ET
VERBVM

ERAT (apud Deum)
In the beginning was the Word,

and the Word was with God,

and the Word was God.

—John 1:1

On either side of the sculpture, there is an epigraph referring to the bell tower's designer, Nicolangelo Romano:

NICO LA•N
ANGE LU•RO
MANV MAGI
STER•M̄ FECIT

A second eagle is placed on the side of the keystone facing the apse, and is of simpler workmanship, with no inscription.

===== Bas-reliefs with Jonah and the sea serpent and sarcophagi =====
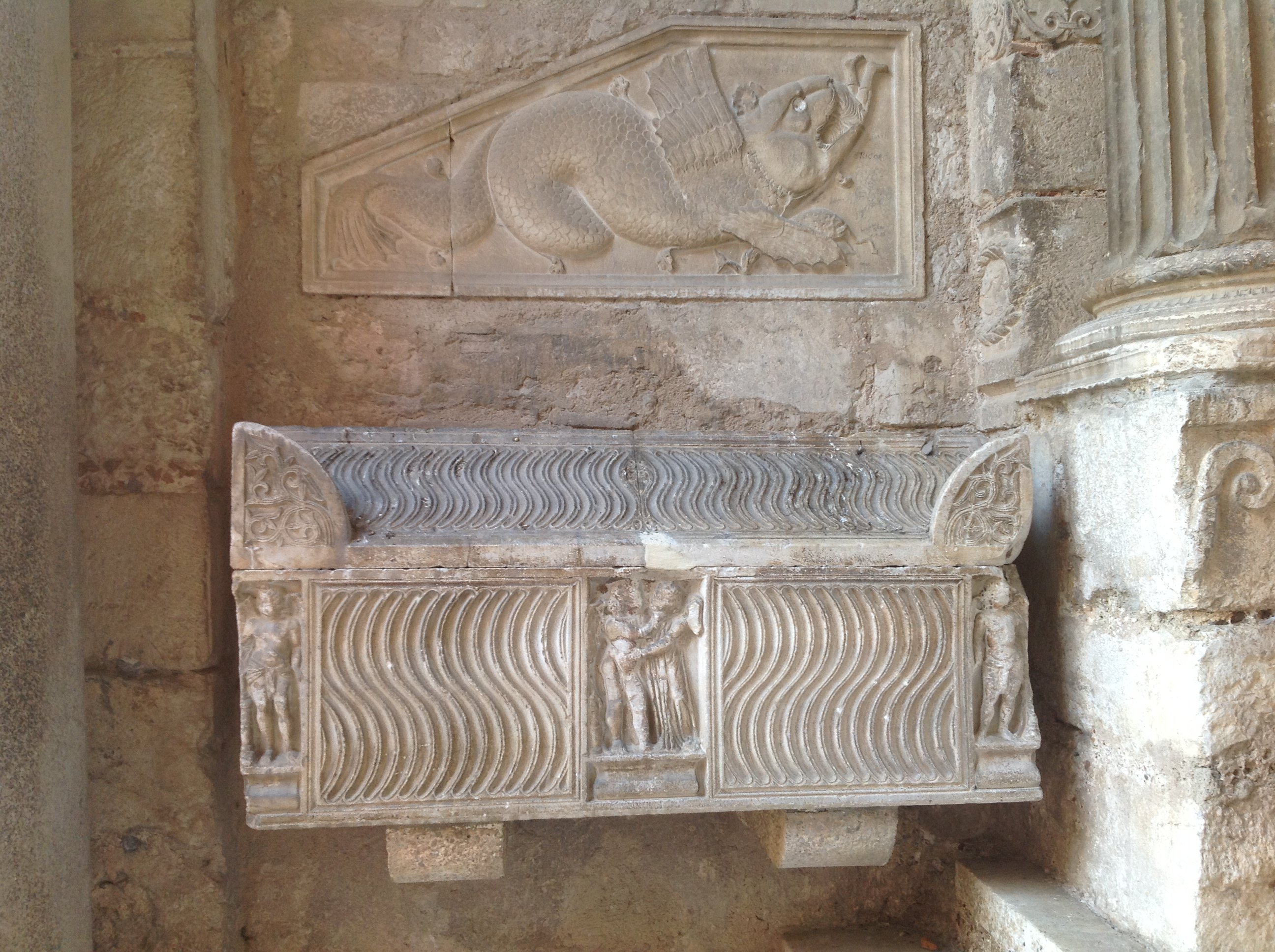
The sarcophagus on the left and the bas-relief Jonah being eaten by the sea serpent.

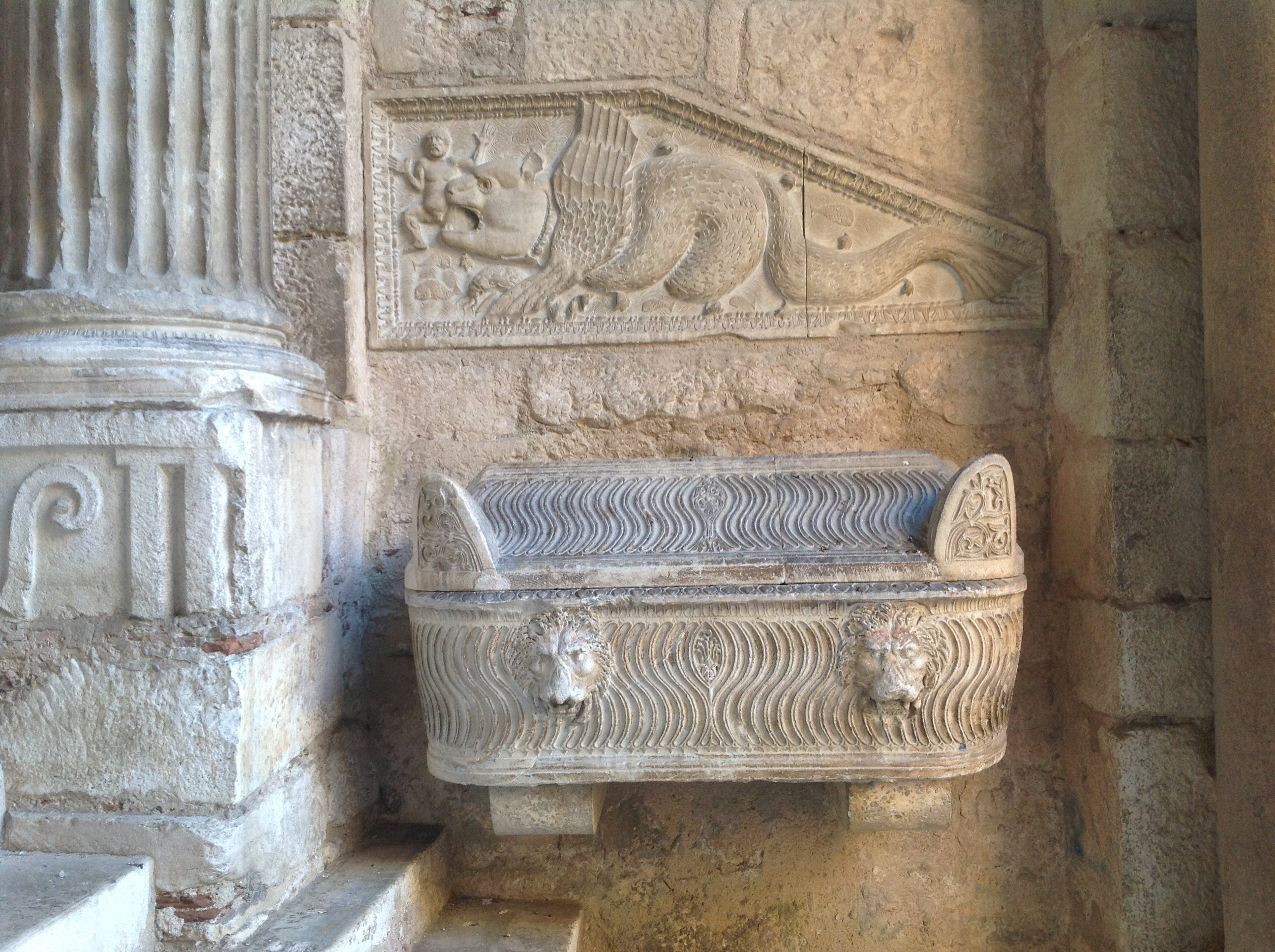
The sarcophagus on the right and the bas-relief Jonah being released by the sea serpent.

Along the side walls of the first bay are two opposing Roman sarcophagi, which were placed in their present location in the 15th century. Above them are walled two bas-reliefs depicting the biblical episode of Jonah and the sea serpent (Jonah 2), a subject typical of Abruzzese, Campanian and Lower Lazio sacred art of the 9th-13th centuries; these originally formed the parapet of the access staircase to the ambon of the cathedral, datable to the first half of the 13th century. A similar arrangement can be seen in the pulpit of the collegiate church of San Pietro in Minturno, built in 1246 having as a model that of Gaeta Cathedral, later dismembered and reassembled in 1618.

Each of the two panels features an irregular pentagon shape similar to a rectangular trapezoid at the base of which a rectangle of equal width has been juxtaposed. The relief sculptural decoration of the slab walled in the left wall presents the first scene of the story, with Jonah being swallowed by the sea serpent (Jonah 2:1); the conclusion is in the slab opposite, in which, after the prophet's stay in the belly of the sea serpent for three days and three nights and the prayer addressed to the Lord (Jonah 2:2–10), Jonah is depicted being released. The figure of the fish, characterized by a strong realism and similar in some respects to a dragon, with wings, and scales and a webbed tail, is similar to that on the ambon of the epistle in the basilica of Santa Maria Assunta in Ravello (in mosaic) and the pulpit in Minturno (in bas-relief); as well as to a bas-relief fragment with Jonah set free of unknown provenance, now in the National Museum of Capodimonte, and to another, lost, probably from the lost ambon of the ancient cathedral of Montecassino. Although the two bas-reliefs in the bell tower have always been considered to be contemporary and part of a single structure (the ancient ambon of the cathedral), they show considerable differences between them, both iconographic and stylistic (such as the frames, the figure of the sea serpent, the background), as well as in size (the left panel is wider than the right one); these differences are probably due either to a different workmanship in the realization of the two sculptures (although they pertain to the same workshop), or to a case-like structure of the ancient ambon (due to which they would not have been evident), or even to the presence of two ambons inside the cathedral.

The two sarcophagi date from the third century. The one on the left has a rectangular-shaped chest, with two strigilated fields interspersed with bas-reliefs depicting winged Genies at the ends, and in the center probably Cupid and Psyche; at the corners of the double-sloping lid, there are akroteria with floral motifs. The one on the right, on the other hand, has the two semicircular side ends; also strigilated, it features two lion heads on the front of the chest, placed on either side of a palm leaf decoration, also repeated on the lid.

=== Tower ===
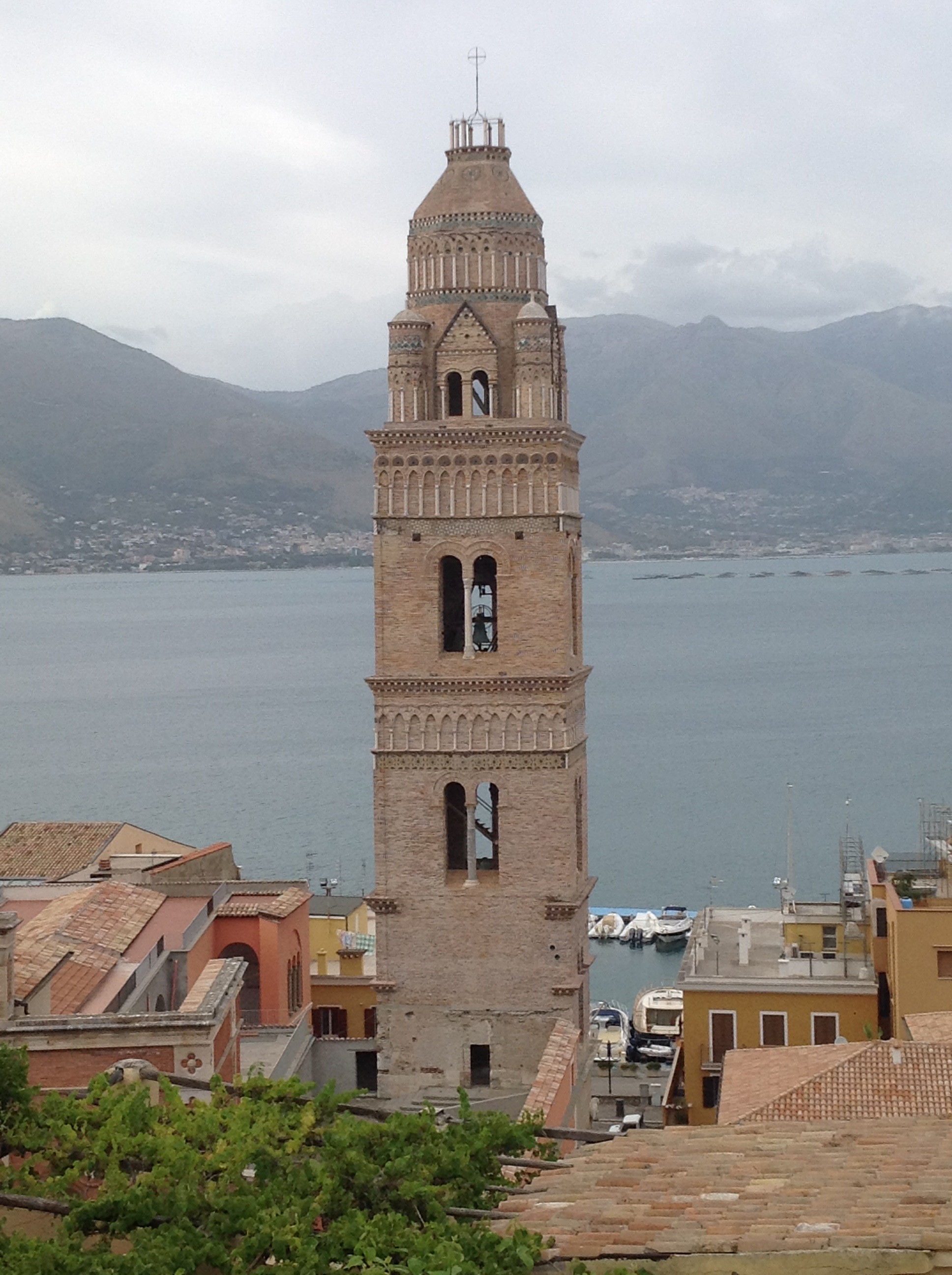
The bell tower as seen from the south.

The tower rises 44 meters above the basement, with an exposed brick wall face internally reinforced with a reinforced concrete structure built between 1958 and 1963.

The belfry is divided into three orders, divided by brick cornices with double rows of marble corbels, a typically cosmatesque element widely used in the bell towers of Rome in the 12th and 13th centuries, such as those of the basilica of Santa Cecilia in Trastevere, the basilica of Santa Maria in Trastevere and the church of San Giorgio in Velabro. Each of the three storeys opens on the outside with a bifora with two round arches supported in the center by a smooth Corinthian column.

The lower order, compared to the other two, has some peculiarities: it is the only one to have only three mullioned windows (it is absent on the south side, facing the cathedral hall) and to have a second cornice (having, however, only one row of marble corbels) placed at the height of the shutter of the window arches.

The second order is decorated, above the mullioned windows, with a two-colored marble band with geometric motifs; on it rests a theory of interlaced pointed arches, a typical element of Arab-Norman architecture, resting on marble columns. Above the northern mullioned window, in the interior façade, the remains of the mechanism of the 18th-century clock, no longer in operation, can be seen; its marble dial was removed during the 1958-1962 restorations and is currently on display at the Diocesan Museum along with the hands and numerals.

Interior of the tower

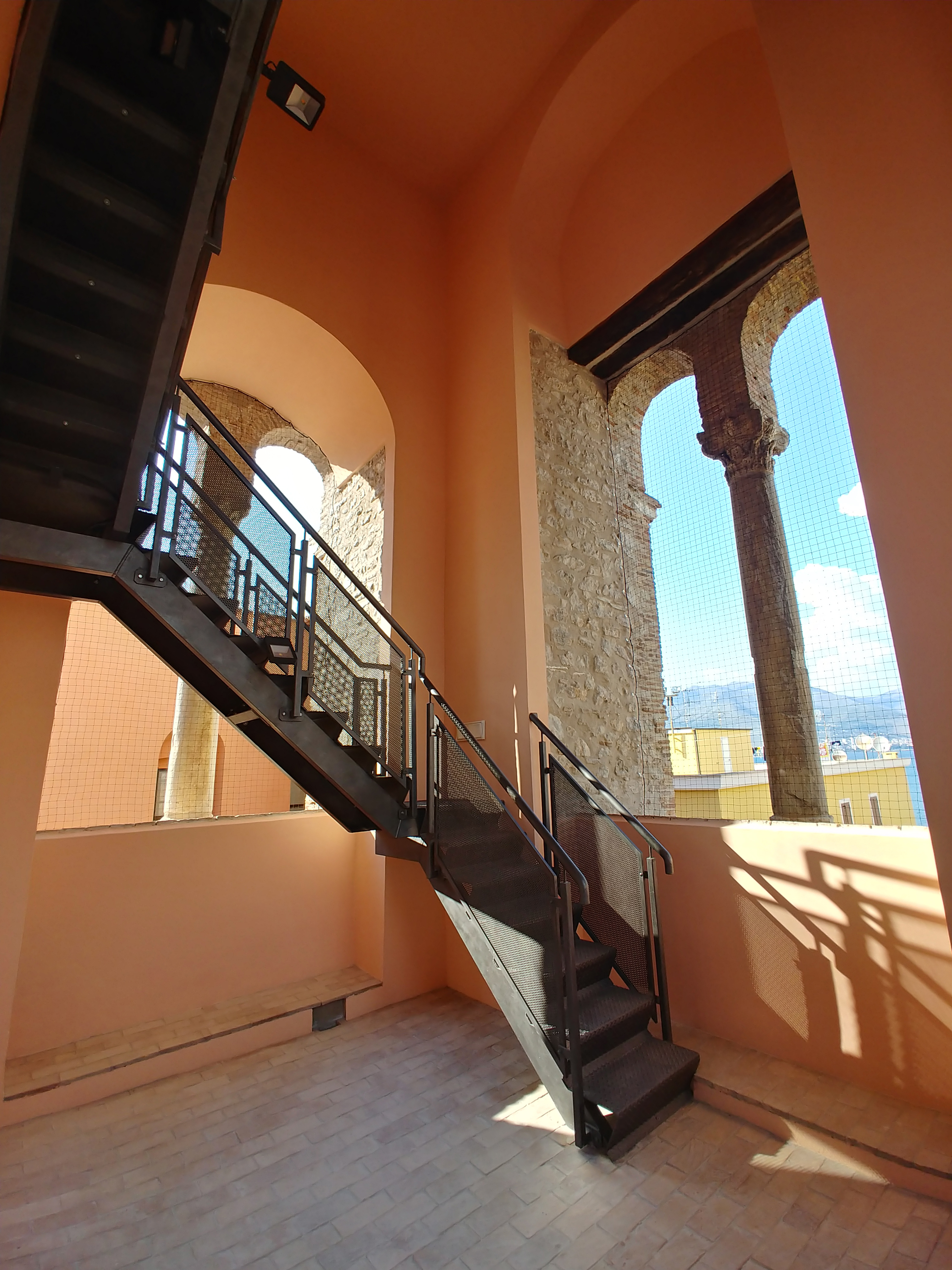
First floor.

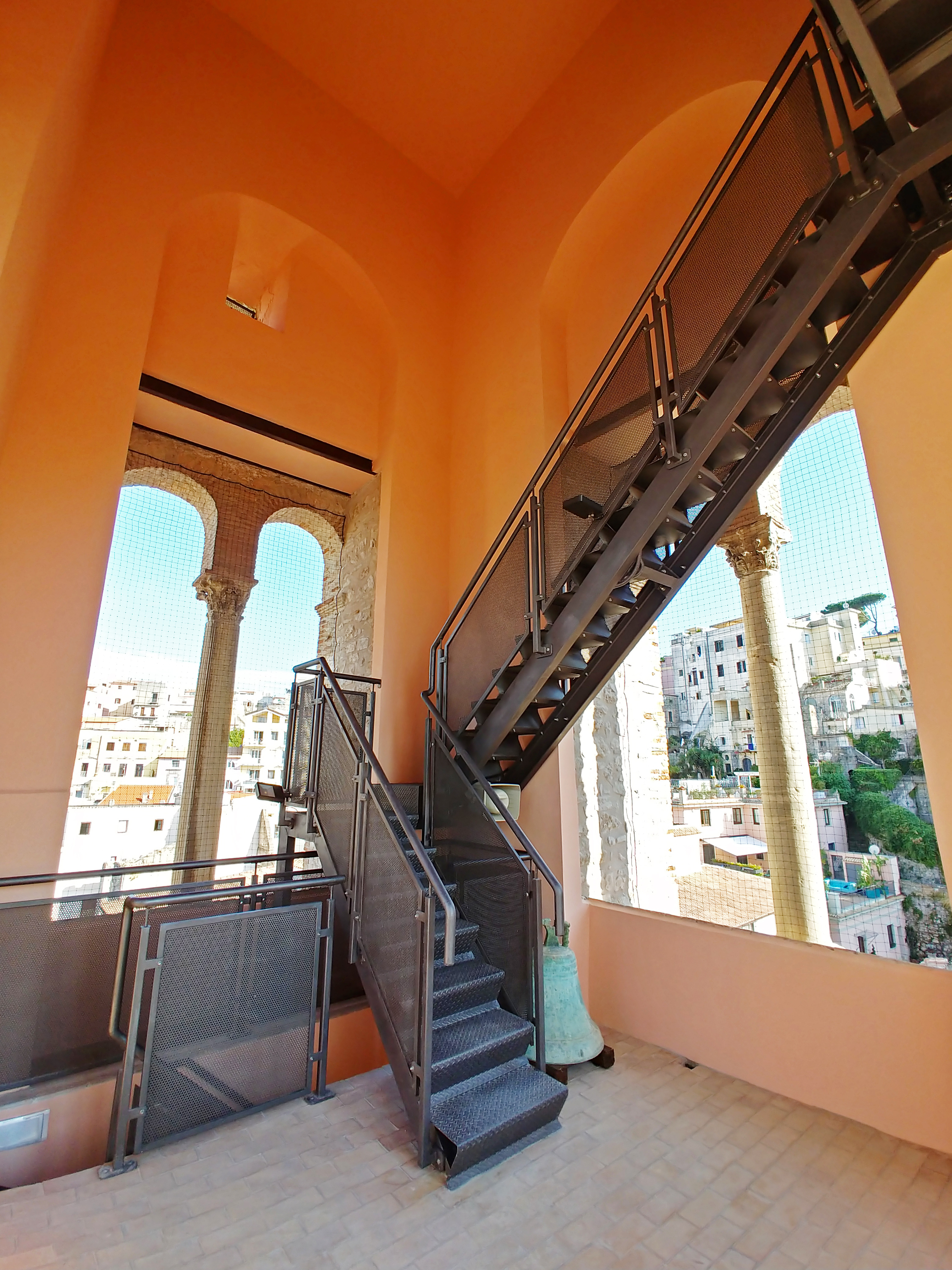
Second floor.

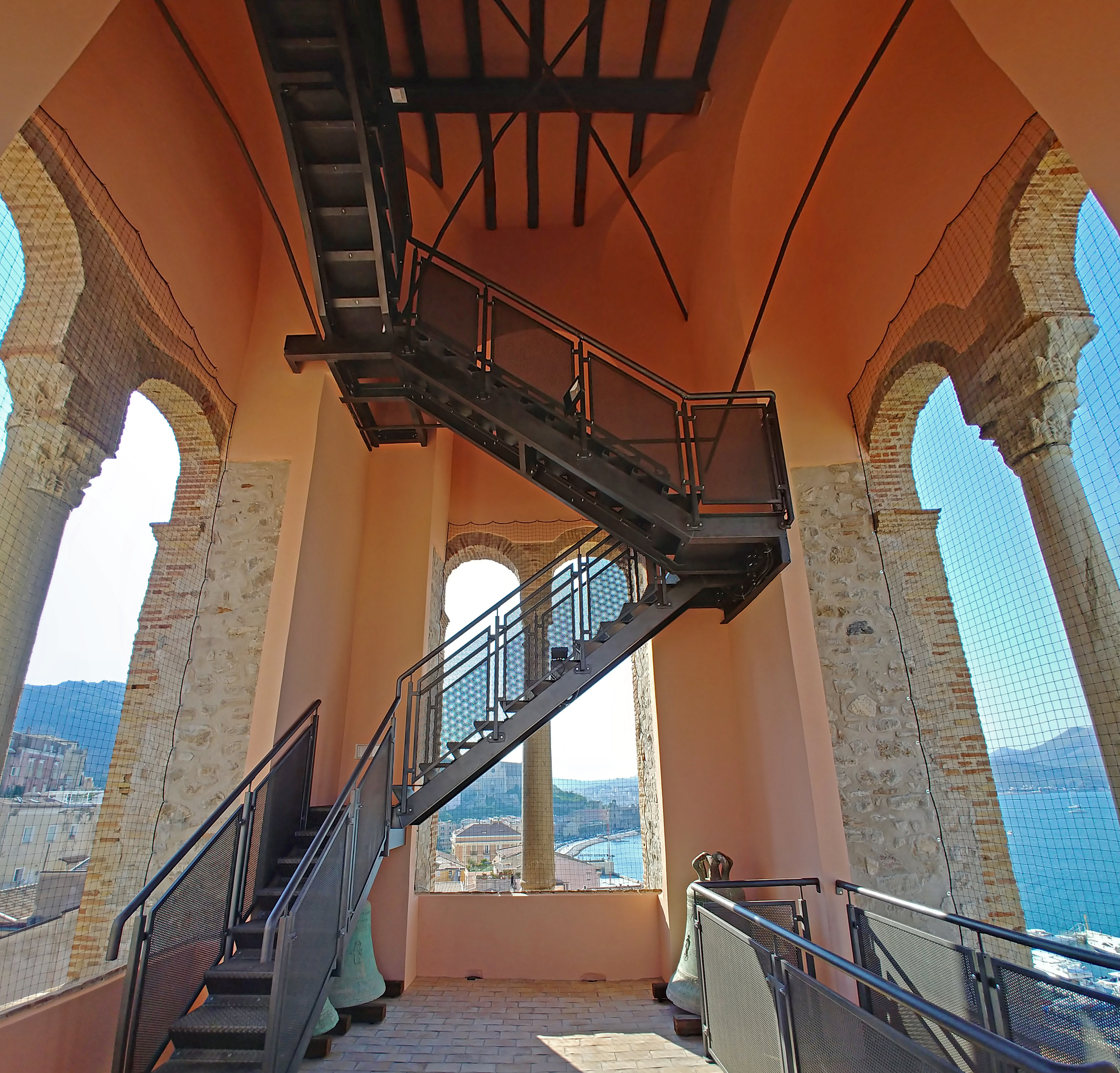
Third floor.

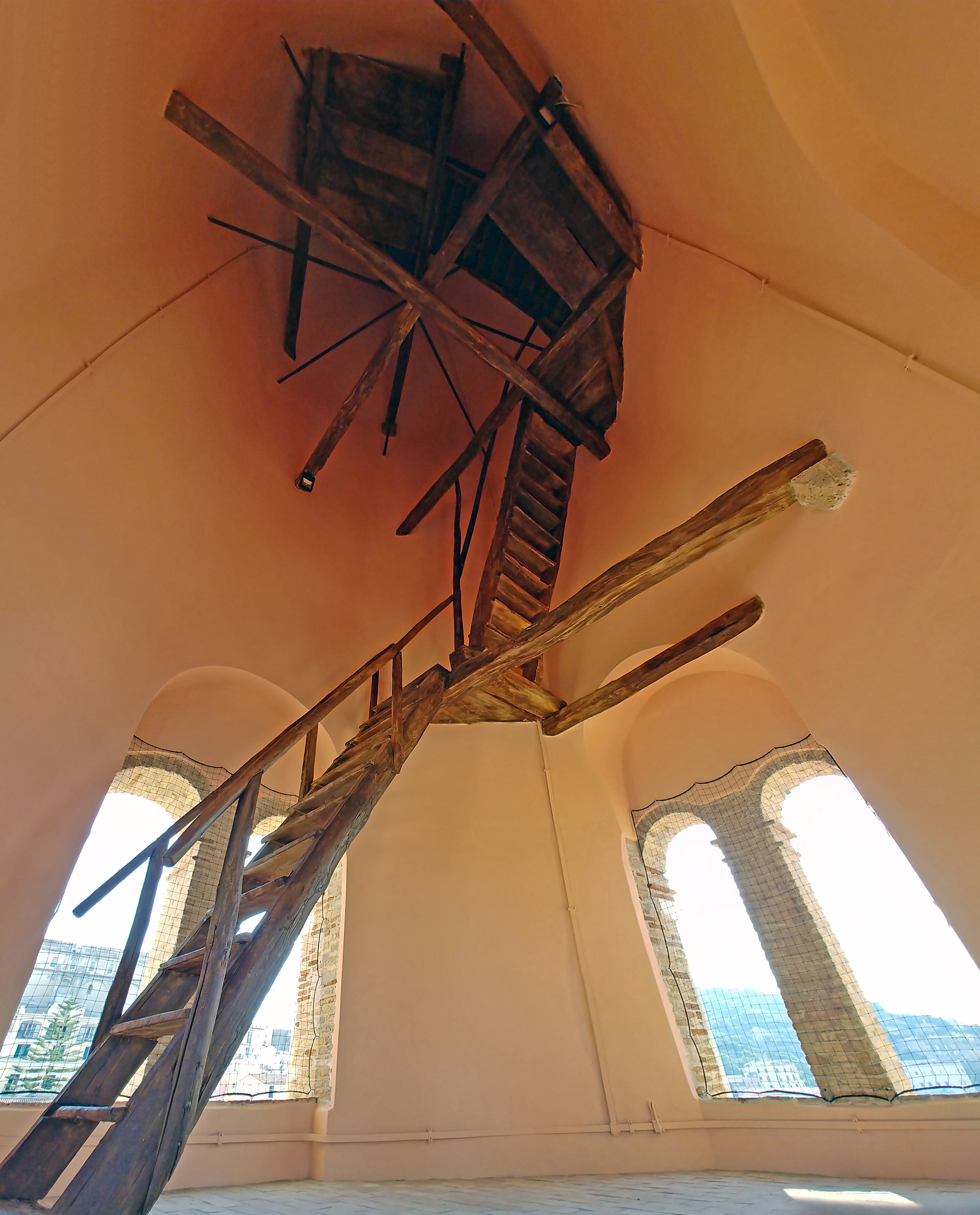
Turret

The third and last order is also decorated, above the windows, by a marble band with two-colored geometric inlays; it is surmounted by a series of small ogival arches resting on small columns, more slender than those on the lower floor, at one of which is embedded in the masonry a glazed ceramic basin painted green, an element also found on the bell tower of the demolished church of Santa Barbara in Gaeta and on the Gothic bell-gable (14th century) of the sanctuary of Santissima Annunziata. The double lintel of the mullioned windows of the second and third orders is an element also found in Gaeta on the bell towers of the church of San Domenico (12th century, the only surviving element of the former church of Santa Maria della Maina) and the former church of Santa Lucia (13th century). Inside the third order is the castle supporting the bells, which is not in use; three new bells were donated to the cathedral in 2011, which are currently placed inside the pronaos of the cathedral façade and are not in use.

At the top of the tower is the turret, completed in 1279 and richly decorated with rows of small arches and enameled elements. The structure has an octagonal plan, with four circular turrets at the corners, which have a theory of interlaced ogival arches resting on marble columns and, between this and the crowning cap, a band with enameled lozenges and triangles framing recessed basins. Alternating with the turrets, four mullioned windows open outward, supported in the center by a masonry pillar and surmounted by a triangular gable. Above them, several decorative bands unfold: from below, there is a row of enameled lozenges, surmounted by a cornice that ideally supports a theory of small pointed arches intertwined with small columns, within each of which a basin is inserted; higher up, there is another row of enameled lozenges and a further double cornice. The roof consists of a truncated brick pyramid. Among the basins embedded in the masonry, some are painted with polychrome figures of animals (fish and birds), of the Gela ware type.

== Similar bell towers ==
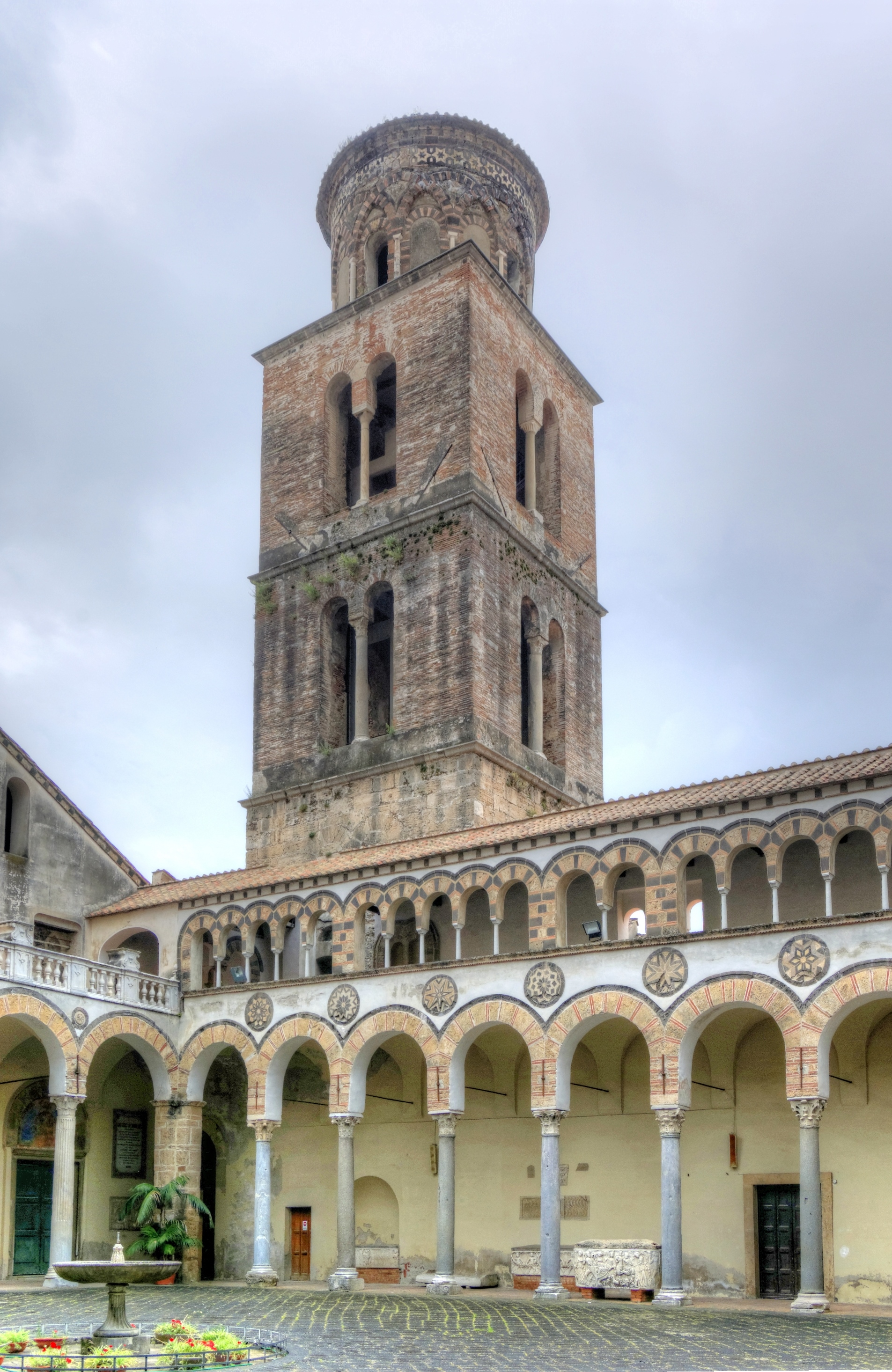
Bell tower of the cathedral of Salerno

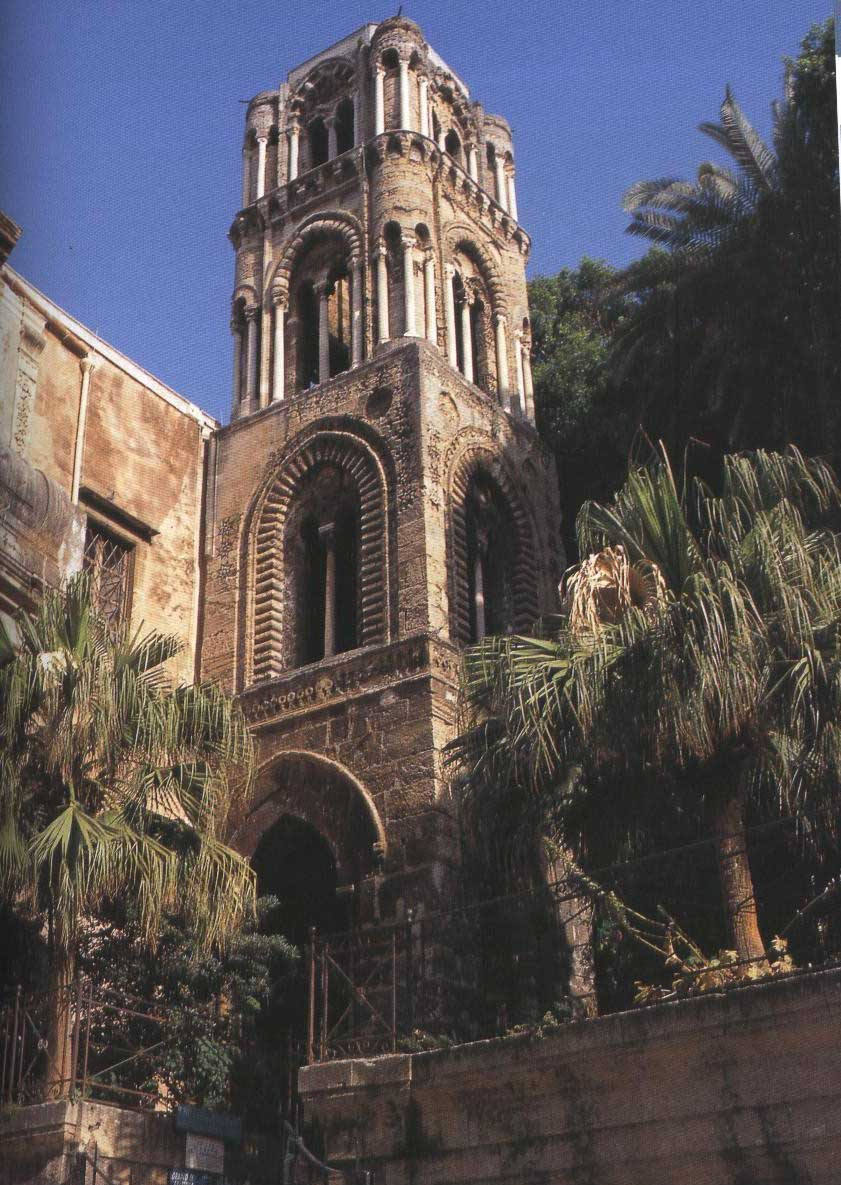
Bell tower of the Martorana church in Palermo

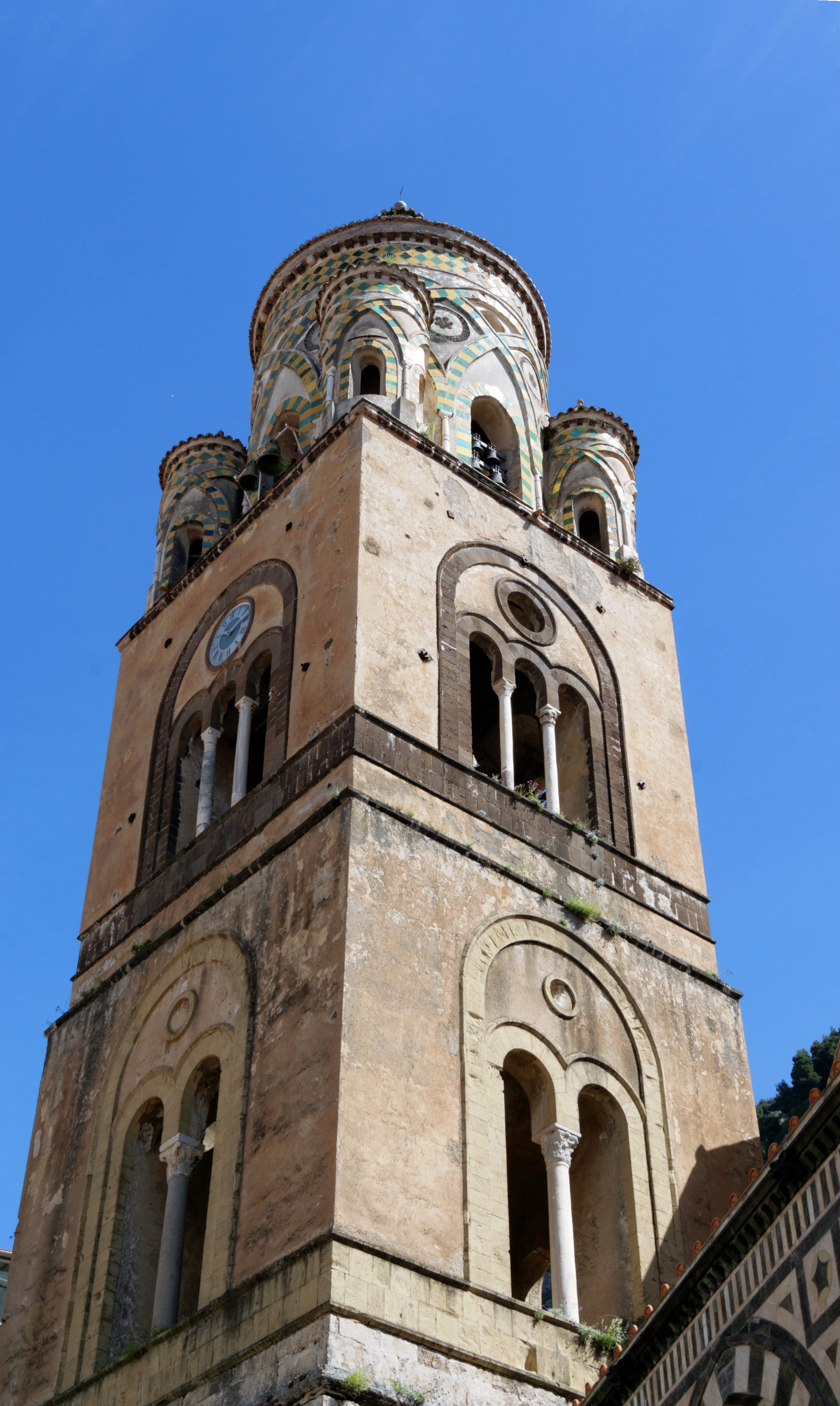
Bell tower of the cathedral of Sant'Andrea in Amalfi

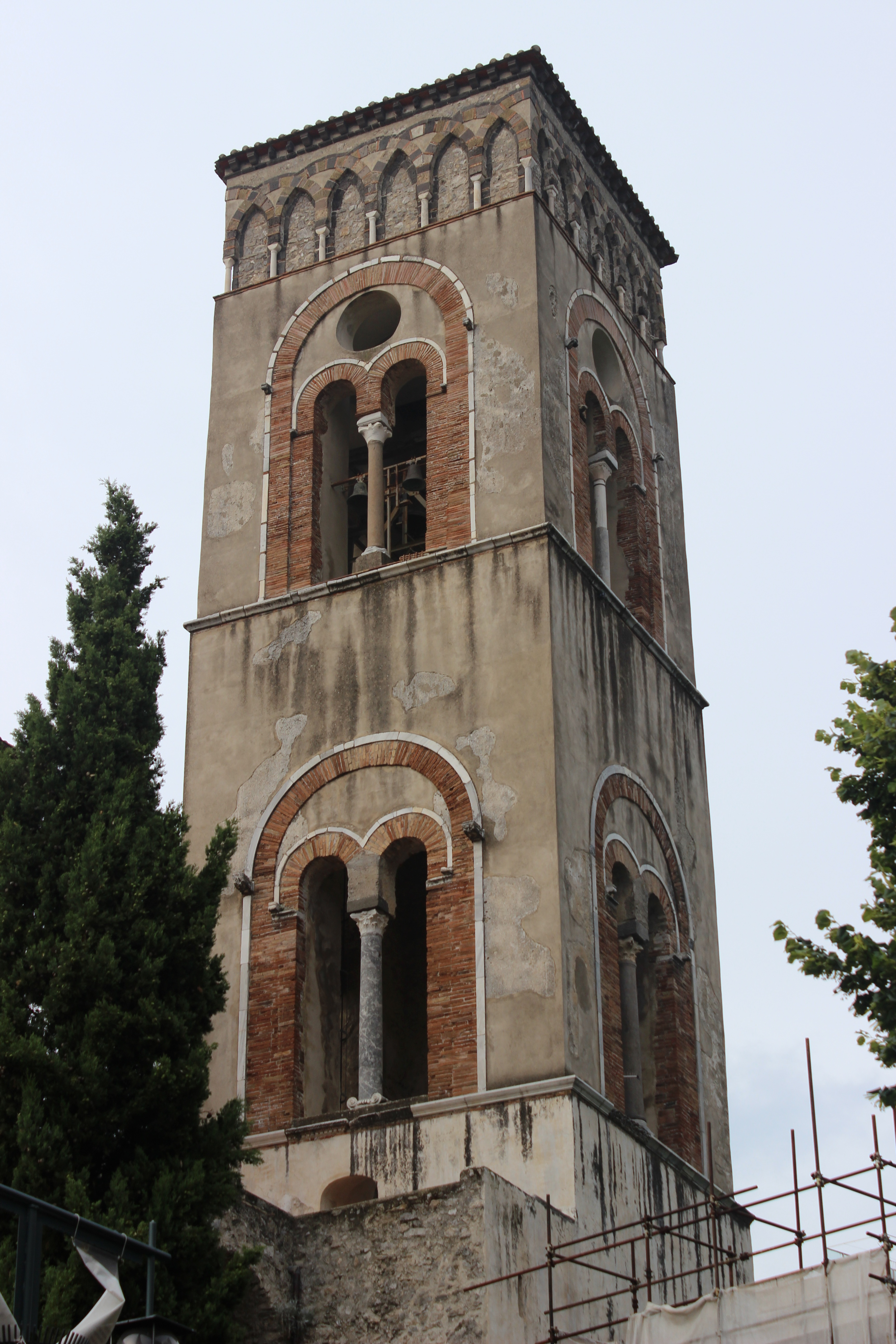
Bell tower of the basilica of Santa Maria Assunta in Ravello

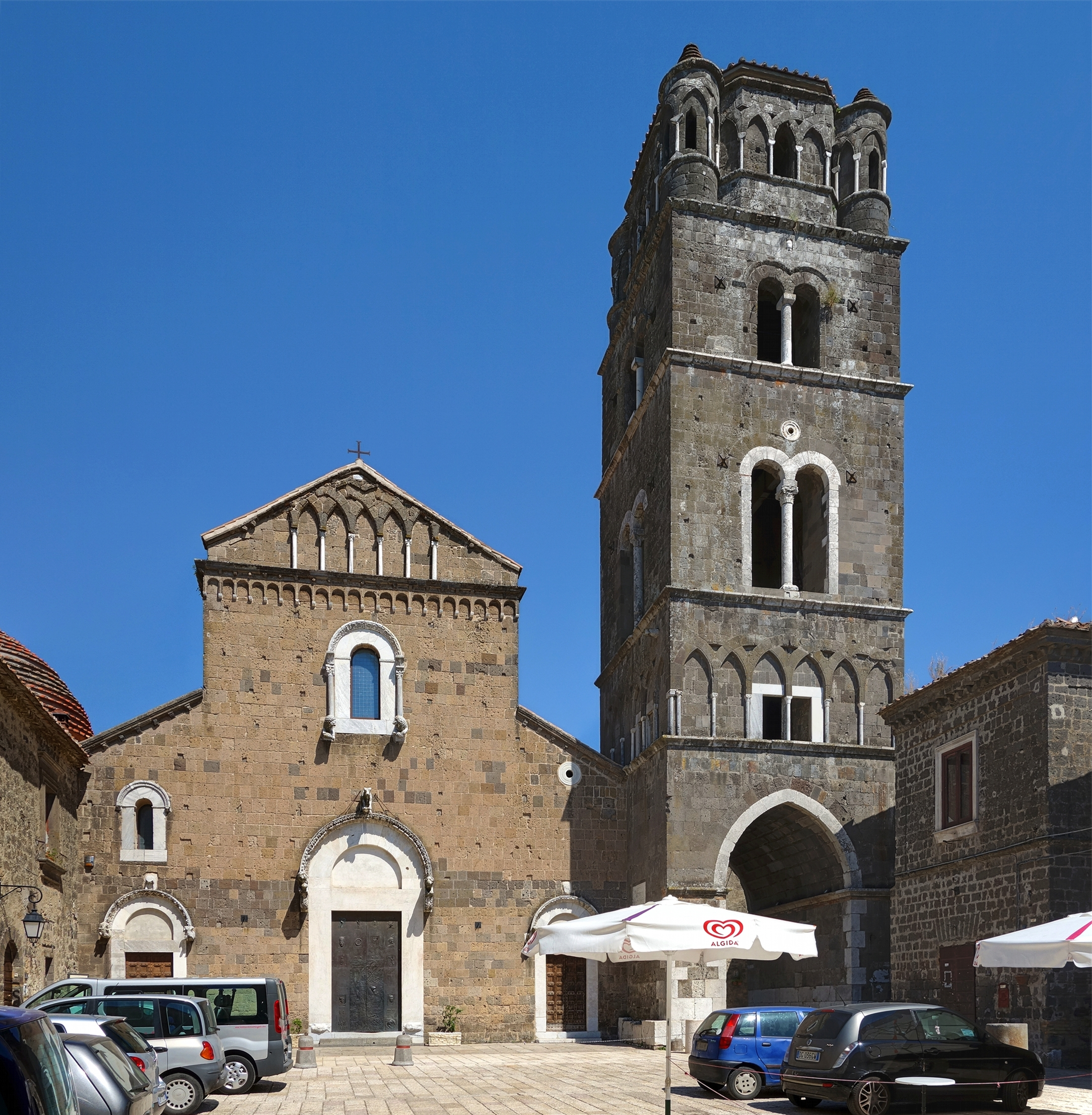
Façade and bell tower of the former cathedral of San Michele in Casertavecchia

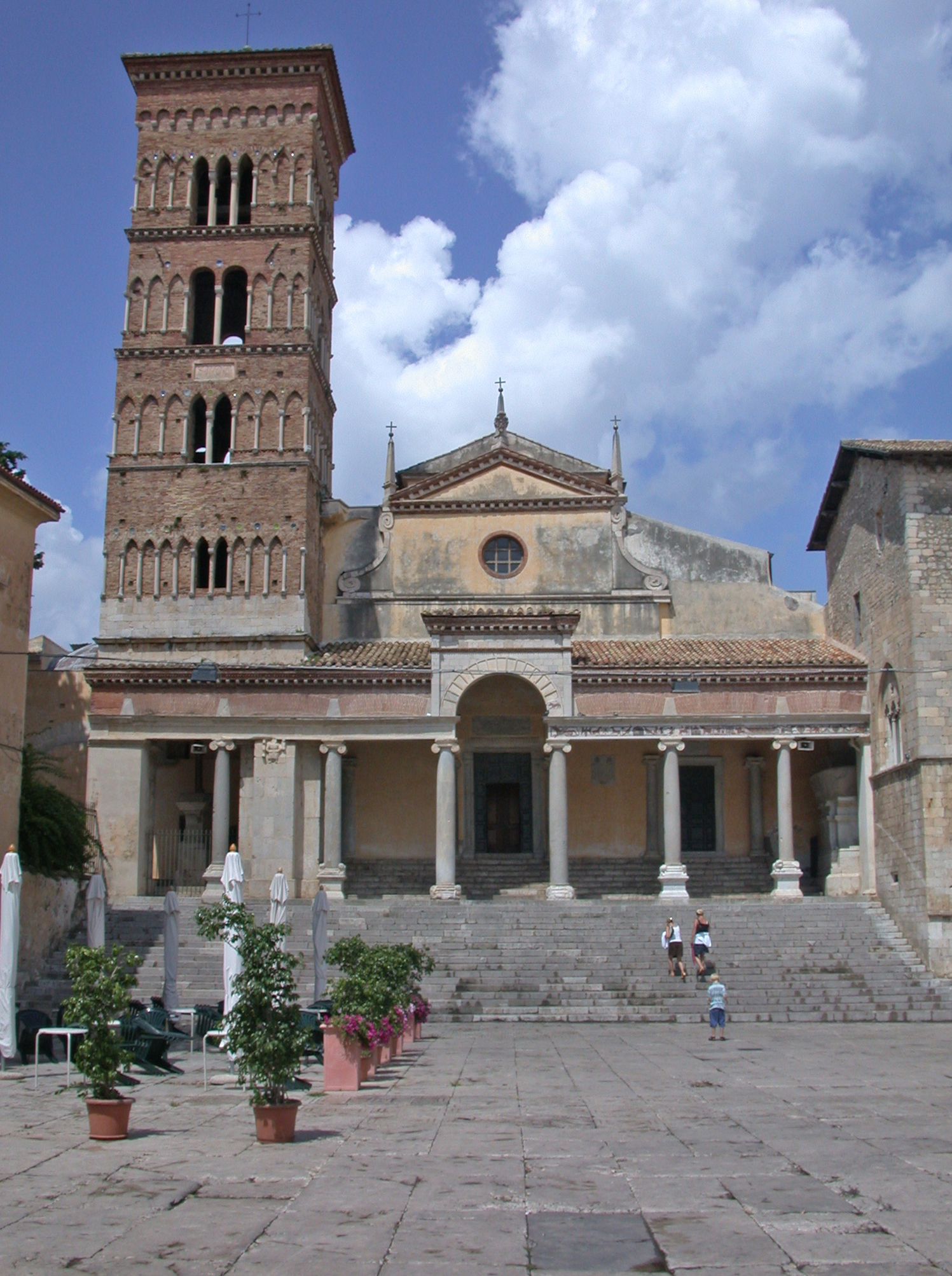
Façade and bell tower of the co-cathedral of San Cesareo in Terracina

In southern Italy and Sicily there are several bell towers from the 12th and 13th centuries that show stylistic-structural similarities with that of Gaeta Cathedral.

Among the oldest is that of Salerno Cathedral, whose construction began in 1145 at the behest of Archbishop Guglielmo of Ravenna and was completed by the end of the 12th century. Fifty-two meters high, it is divided into three orders with a quadrangular plan and tall double lancet windows (those on the lower floor were walled in 1761-1762 to improve the stability of the tower), and an apical belfry with a circular plan, decorated externally by a theory of small ogival arches intertwined with marble columns and ferrules characterized by an alternation of terracotta and stone.

The bell tower of the church of Santa Maria dell'Ammiraglio, known as the Martorana, in Palermo, is the first in Italy to feature four angular turrets with a circular plan on either side of the central body, in this case with a square plan, in the two upper orders. Built between 1146 and 1185, it is set against the axial facade of the church, with the base opening outward with three ogival arches, and lacks the crowning, which was demolished in the late 18th century.

The bell tower of the cathedral of Sant'Andrea in Amalfi would have been built between 1108 and 1276 (in the latter part of the 12th century the tower would have been built, while the crowning tower, used as a belfry, would not have been built until the middle of the following century). There is a reference to that of Gaeta in the use of slender poliforas (biforas in the first order and triforas in the second) and in the elaborate dome, completed in the same years as that of the Latian town and also flanked by four circular turrets; however, the latter's remarkable polychromy, with green and yellow glazes, stands out, which is more pronounced than that of Gaeta.

The bell tower of the basilica of Santa Maria Assunta in Ravello, formerly a cathedral, dates from the 13th century. It has a square plan with two orders of round-arched mullioned windows emphasized by tall brick ferrules; the top features a series of interlaced ogival arches in tuff, supported by light marble columns.

The bell tower of the former cathedral of St. Michael the Archangel in Casertavecchia was built in the first half of the 13th century and completed by 1234. It is flanked by the church, to the right of the facade, and rests on a wide pointed arch that forms a barrel-vaulted passage under which there is a street; the wall face is entirely of tuff blocks, with decorative elements of light marble. The first order, lower than the others, has a theory of interlaced ogival arches framing successive rectangular windows; Romanesque mullioned windows open in the second and third, with the lower ones being more slender. The crowning, similar to that of Gaeta, is octagonal, flanked by four circular turrets, with continuous arch decoration. Originally the crowning was a tall pyramidal spire, similar to that of the church of San Pietro a Majella in Naples and demolished in the last quarter of the 18th century because it was in a poor state of preservation.

The bell tower of the co-cathedral of San Cesareo in Terracina, dating back to the second half of the 12th century and attributable to the same craftsmen working in Gaeta, has strong links with Roman cosmatesque towers, particularly in the alternation between the bricks of the structure and the white marble of the decorative elements; the ornamental function is entrusted to the latter rather than to enameled elements, of Arab-Moorish derivation, used in greater numbers on the bell tower of Gaeta Cathedral. The tower rests on the contemporary portico that precedes the facade, and is supported by a stone base. It is divided into four orders, each of which is characterized by a series of crossed ogival arches resting on marble columns, which constitute the dominant decorative element; the arches are blind at the sides, while at the center they provide light to the interior of the bell tower.

== See also ==
- Norman–Arab–Byzantine culture
- Gaeta Cathedral

== Bibliography ==
- Federici, Giovanni Battista (1791). Degli Antichi duchi e consoli o ipati della città di Gaeta. Napoli: Vincenzo Flauto.
- Pergamo, Carlo (1779). Constitutiones diocesanae synodi. Napoli: Typographia Raymundiana.
- Schulz, Heinrich Wilhelm (1860). Denkmäler der Kunst des Mittelalters in Unteritalien (in German). Vol. II. Dresda: Wilhelm K. H. Schulz. doi:10.11588/DIGLIT.22894.
- Gaetani d'Aragona, Onorato (1885). Memorie storiche della città di Gaeta (2 ed.). Caserta: Stabilimento tipo-litografico della Minerva.
- Ferraro, Salvatore (1903). Memorie religiose e civili della città di Gaeta. Napoli: Tipografia Francesco Giannini & Figli.
- De Angelis, Michele (1926). Fra pulpiti e campanili. Vicende artistiche del cento e del duecento nel mezzogiorno d'Italia. Salerno: Premiato Stabilimento tipografico Spadafora. pp. 179–230.
- Corpus Inscriptionum Latinarum. Vol. X. Berlino: Reimerum. 1933.
- Salemme, Luigi (1939). Il borgo di Gaeta: contributo alla storia locale. Torino: ITER.
- Perrotti, Raffaele (1960). Restauro del campanile della Cattedrale di Gaeta. Gaeta: Tip. B. Fogar.
- Pasquale Corbo, ed. (1962). 10 novembre 1958 - 11 novembre 1962: 4 anni di progresso per Gaeta. Gaeta: Comune di Gaeta.
- Venditti, Arnaldo (1967). Architettura bizantina nell'Italia meridionale: Campania - Calabria - Lucania. Vol. 2. Napoli: Edizioni scientifiche italiane.
- Fiengo, Giuseppe (1969). "Il campanile di Gaeta". Napoli nobilissima: Rivista d'arte e topografia napoletana. 8. Napoli: Berisio: 154–164.
- Allaria, Giuseppe (1970). Le chiese di Gaeta. Latina: Ente Provinciale per il Turismo, Camera di Commercio.
- Giuseppe Fiengo (1971). Gaeta: monumenti e storia urbanistica. Napoli: Edizioni scientifiche italiane.
- Di Marco, Marcello; Colozzo, Franca; Vaudo, Erasmo (1972). Il campanile del duomo di Gaeta. Gaeta: Centro Storico Culturale.
- Giordano, Alberto (1972). La cattedra episcopale di Gaeta. Gaeta: Centro Storico Culturale.
- Migliavacca, Nicola (August 1976). "Il mausoleo di Lucio Atratino". Gazzetta di Gaeta. 3 (8 (38)). Gaeta: La Poligrafica: 11–14.
- Abita, Salvatore; Vaudo, Erasmo; Albano, Ennio; Imondi, Giuliano, eds. (1977). La veduta di Gaeta nell'800 napoletano. Gaeta: La Poligrafica.
- Scalesse, Tommaso (1979). "La chiesa di S. Domenico a Gaeta". Quaderni dell'Istituto di Storia dell'Architettura. 25. Roma: Istituto di Storia dell'Architettura: 79–90.
- D'Onofrio, Mario (1993). La Cattedrale di Caserta Vecchia (2 ed.). Roma: Editalia.
- L'Année épigraphique. Parigi: Presses universitaires de France. 1995. ISSN 0066-2348.
- D'Onofrio, Mario (1996–1997). "La Cattedrale di Gaeta nel medioevo". Rivista dell'Istituto nazionale di archeologia e storia dell'arte. 19–20. Roma: Rivista dell’Istituto nazionale di archeologia e storia dell’arte: 227–249. ISSN 0392-5285.
- Fronzuto, Graziano (2001). Monumenti d'arte sacra a Gaeta: storia ed arte dei maggiori edifici religiosi di Gaeta. Gaeta: Edizioni del Comune di Gaeta.
- Fulchignoni, Guido (2001). Ravello: le cento chiese. Amalfi: Centro di cultura e storia amalfitana.
- Granata, Piergiorgio (2004). Gaeta: viaggio nell'arte: pittura, scultura e arti minori dal medioevo ad oggi. Napoli: Guida. ISBN 978-88-7188-745-6.
- Docci, Marina (2006). San Paolo fuori le mura: dalle origini alla basilica delle origini. Roma: Gangemi.
- Gianandrea, Manuela (2006). La scena del sacro. L'arredo liturgico del basso Lazio tra XI e XIV secolo. Roma: Viella.
- Tallini, Gaetano (2006). Gaeta: una città nella storia. Gaeta: Edizioni del Comune di Gaeta.
- Spinosa, Arianna (2008). "Il restauro del Campanile della Cattedrale di Gaeta (1960)". Restaurare i restauri: Metodi, compatibilità, cantieri. Marghera: Arcadia Ricerche: 401–410.
- Tallini, Gennaro (2013). Vita quotidiana a Gaeta nell'età del viceregno spagnolo. Gaeta: Centro Storico Culturale "Gaeta".
- Sorabella, Lino (2014). Ecclesia Mater. La Cattedrale di Gaeta. Marina di Minturno: Caramanica Editore.
- Pomarici, Francesca (2015). "L'Agnello e il liber creaturarum: il programma iconografico delle lunette". Medioevo in Molise: Il Cantiere della Chiesa di San Giorgio Martire a Petrella Tifernina. Roma: Gangemi: 87–109. ISBN 978-88-492-9460-6.
- Vella, Alessandro (2016). "Formia. S. Erasmo. Ecclesia". Fana, Templa, Delubra. Corpus dei Luoghi di Culto dell'Italia Antica. Institut des civilisations. Parigi: Collège de France: 60–66. doi:10.4000/books.cdf.4255. ISBN 978-2-7226-0443-8.
