= Nicholas Picingli =

Byzantine general

Nicholas Epigingles (Greek: Νικόλαος Ἐπιγίγγλης), better known by his Latinized surname Picingli, was a Byzantine general active in southern Italy and the Balkans. As strategos of the thema of Longobardia, he led the Byzantine contingent of the Christian league in the Battle of Garigliano in 915. He was killed fighting against the Bulgarians, probably in the Battle of Acheloos on 20 August 917.

== Life ==
Nicholas was appointed as strategos of Longobardia sometime after the summer of 911 (his predecessor Ioannikios is last mentioned in May), most likely however after June 913. He is known to have corresponded with Niketas Paphlagon, probably in the 10th century, as well as with the Patriarch of Constantinople Nicholas I Mystikos, particularly during the latter's regency in 913–914. In his letters, Nicholas reports the dismal condition of the fortresses in southern Italy, which he attributes to his predecessor's negligence, while the Patriarch encourages him to persevere and confront the Arabs who were raiding the province from their base at the Garigliano River near Gaeta.

Nicholas consequently participated in a league of the Christian princes of southern Italy, including Pope John X and the Lombard princes Alberic I of Spoleto, Landulf I of Benevento and Capua and Guaimar II of Salerno. The rulers of Gaeta and Naples, hypatus John I and dux Gregory IV respectively, both technically Byzantine vassals, were given the title of patrikios during the negotiations. In August 915 (or 916) the Christian allies moved against the Arab stronghold at Garigliano. With the Byzantine fleet blockading the Arabs from the sea, the Christians besieged the stronghold for three months, until the starving Arabs tried to break through and escape. The battle was a decisive victory for the Christian league that restored a measure of security to southern Italy. After his victory Nicholas received a letter from the Patriarch, where the latter congratulated him and expressed his joy, adding that although he would like to reward him, in his present circumstances he could only pray for him.

From commentaries on a series of manuscripts of the works of Plutarch, it is known that Nicholas died in battle against the Bulgarians; the commentaries compare his death to that of Lucius Aemilius Paullus at the Battle of Cannae. M. Manfredini, the editor of these manuscripts, identified the battle with the disastrous Byzantine defeat at the Battle of Acheloos on 20 August 917.

== Sources ==
- Lilie, Ralph-Johannes; Ludwig, Claudia; Pratsch, Thomas; Zielke, Beate (2013). Prosopographie der mittelbyzantinischen Zeit Online. Berlin-Brandenburgische Akademie der Wissenschaften. Nach Vorarbeiten F. Winkelmanns erstellt (in German). Berlin and Boston: De Gruyter.
- Previté-Orton, C. W. (1922). "Italy in the Tenth Century". The Cambridge Medieval History, Volume III: Germany and the Western Empire. New York: The Macmillan Company. pp. 148–178.
