= Pope John X =

Head of the Catholic Church from 914 to 928

- Bishop of Rome
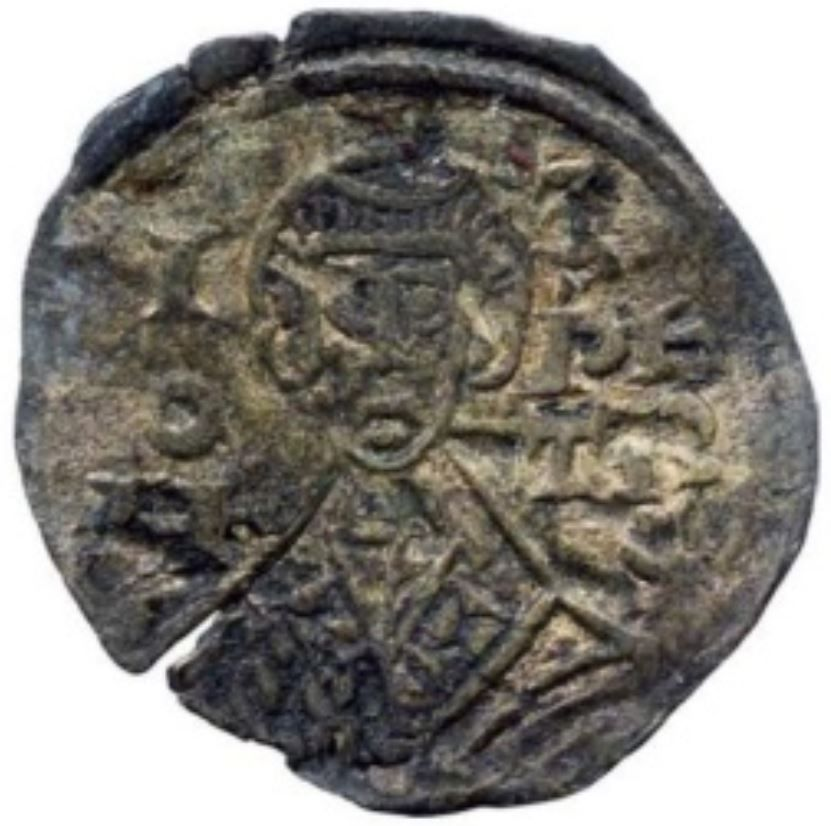
- Denarius of John X
- Church: Catholic Church
- Papacy began: March 914
- Papacy ended: May 928
- Predecessor: Lando
- Successor: Leo VI
- Previous post: Cardinal-Priest (907–914)

Personal details
- Born: Tossignano, Papal States
- Died: 28 May 928 Rome, Papal States

Pope John X (Latin: Ioannes X; died 28 May 928) was the bishop of Rome and nominal ruler of the Papal States from March 914 to his death. A candidate of the counts of Tusculum, he attempted to unify Italy under the leadership of Berengar of Friuli, and was instrumental in the defeat of the Saracens at the Battle of Garigliano. He eventually fell out with Marozia, who had him deposed, imprisoned, and finally murdered. John’s pontificate occurred during the period known as the Saeculum obscurum.

== Early career ==
John X, whose father’s name was also John, was born at Tossignano, along the river Santerno. He was made a deacon by Peter IV, the bishop of Bologna, where he attracted the attention of Theodora, the wife of Theophylact I of Tusculum, the most powerful noble in Rome. John was a relative of Theodora's family. Liutprand of Cremona alleged that John became her lover during a visit to Rome; However, Johann Peter Kirsch says, "This statement is, however, generally and rightly rejected as a calumny. Liutprand wrote his history some fifty years later, and constantly slandered the Romans, whom he hated. At the time of John's election Theodora was advanced in years, and is lauded by other writers (e.g. Vulgarius)."

It was through Theodora’s influence that John was on the verge of succeeding Peter as bishop of Bologna, when the Archbishopric of Ravenna became available. He was consecrated as archbishop in 905 by Pope Sergius III, another clerical candidate of the counts of Tusculum. During his eight years as archbishop, John worked hard with Sergius in an unsuccessful attempt to depose Louis the Blind and have Berengar of Friuli, who claimed the Kingdom of Italy, crowned emperor in his stead. He also had to defend himself from a usurper who tried to take his episcopal see away, as well as confirming his authority over Nonantola Abbey when the abbot attempted to free it from the jurisdiction of the archbishop of Ravenna.

After the death of Pope Lando in 914, a faction of the Roman nobility, headed by Theophylact of Tusculum, summoned John to Rome to assume the vacant papal chair. Although this was again interpreted by Liutprand as Theodora personally intervening to have her lover made pope, it is far more likely that John’s close working relationship with Theophylact, and his opposition to the ordinations of Pope Formosus, were the real reasons for his being transferred from Ravenna to Rome. Since switching sees was considered an infraction of canon law, as well as contravening the decrees of the Lateran Council of 769, which prohibited the installation of a pope without election, John’s appointment was criticised by his contemporaries. Nevertheless, while Theophylact was alive, John adhered to his patron’s cause.

== War with Saracens ==
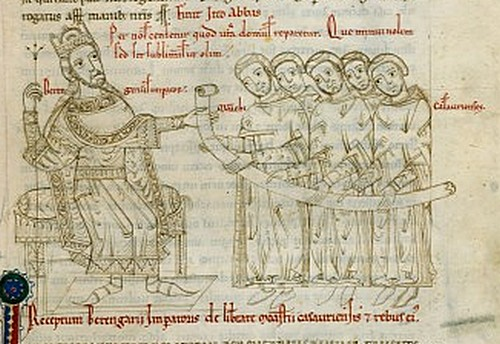
Berengar (seated on the left) whom John X crowned emperor in December 915

The first task that confronted John X was the existence of a Saracen outpost on the Garigliano River, which was used as a base to pillage the Italian countryside. John consulted Landulf I of Benevento, who advised him to seek help from the Byzantine Empire and Alberic I of Spoleto. John took his advice and sent papal legates to Berengar, various Italian princes, as well as to Constantinople, seeking help to throw out the Saracens. The result was a Christian alliance, a precursor to the Crusades of the following century. The forces of the new Byzantine strategos of Bari, Nicholas Picingli, joined those of various other south Italian princes: Landulf I of Benevento, John I and Docibilis II of Gaeta, Gregory IV and John II of Naples, and Guaimar II of Salerno. Meanwhile, Berengar brought with him troops from the northern parts of Italy, and the campaign was coordinated by John X, who took to the field in person, alongside Duke Alberic I of Spoleto.

After some preliminary engagements at Campo Baccano and at Trevi, the Saracens were driven to their stronghold on the Garigliano. There, at the Battle of Garigliano, the allies proceeded to lay siege to them for three months, at the end of which the Saracens burnt their houses and attempted to burst out of the encirclement. With John leading the way, all were eventually caught and killed, achieving a great victory and removing the ongoing Saracen threat on the Italian mainland. John then confirmed the granting of Traetto to the Duke of Gaeta, as a reward for abandoning his Saracen allies.

Berengar had pressed for the imperial crown ever since he had defeated and driven Emperor Louis the Blind out of Italy in 905. John X used this as leverage to push Berengar into supporting and providing troops to the Saracen campaign. Having completed his end of the bargain, Berengar now insisted that John do likewise. So in December 915, Berengar approached Rome, and after being greeted by the family of Theophylact (whose support he secured), he met Pope John at St. Peter’s Basilica. On Sunday 3 December, John crowned Berengar as emperor, while Berengar in turn confirmed previous donations made to the See of Peter by earlier emperors.

== Political realignments ==
Although Berengar had the support of the major Roman nobility and the pope, he had enemies elsewhere. In 923, a combination of the Italian princes brought about the defeat of Berengar, again frustrating the hopes of a united Italy, followed by his assassination in 924. Then in 925 Theophylact of Tusculum and Alberic I of Spoleto also died; this meant that within the course of a year, three of Pope John’s key supporters had died, leaving John dangerously exposed to the ambitions of Theophylact’s daughter, Marozia, who, it was said, resented John’s alleged affair with her mother, Theodora.

To counter the rising threat, John X invited Hugh of Provence to be the next king of Italy, sending his envoy to Pisa to be among the first to greet Hugh as he arrived. Soon after Hugh had been acknowledged as king at Pavia, he met with John at Mantua, and concluded some type of treaty with him, perhaps to defend John’s interests at Rome. King Rudolph II of Burgundy soon laid claim to Italy, and Hugh was not in a position to help John. The next few years were a time of anarchy and confusion in Italy.

Marozia in the meantime had married Margrave Guy of Tuscany. Soon a power struggle began between them and Pope John, with John’s brother, Peter, the first to feel their enmity. John had Peter made duke of Spoleto after Alberic’s death, and his increased power threatened Guy and Marozia. Peter was forced to flee to Lake Orta, where he sought the aid of a rampaging band of Magyars. In 926 he returned to Rome in their company, and with their support he intimidated Guy and Marozia, and Peter was allowed to return to his old role as principal advisor to and supporter of Pope John.

== Eastern affairs ==
Although these troubles were continuing to trouble John in Rome, he was still able to participate and influence broader ecclesiastical and political questions across Europe. In 920, he was asked by the Byzantine Emperors Romanos I and Constantine VII and the Patriarch of Constantinople Nicholas Mystikos to send some legates to Constantinople to confirm the acts of a synod which condemned fourth marriages (a legacy of the conflict which embroiled Constantine’s father Leo VI the Wise) thereby ending a schism between the two churches.

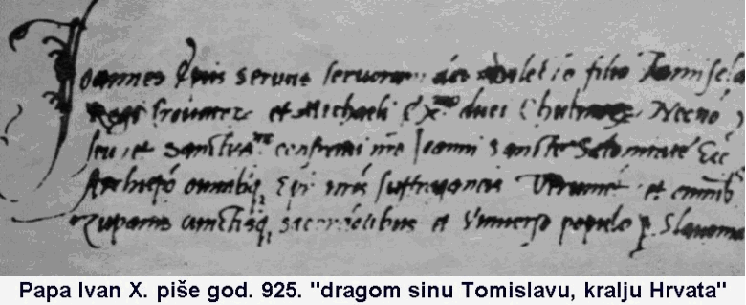
A part of the letter written by John X to the Croatian ruler Tomislav in 925, in which the latter, earlier titled "duke", is now titled "king"

In 925 John attempted to stem the use of the Slav liturgy in Dalmatia, and enforce the local use of Latin in the Mass. He wrote to Tomislav, "king (rex) of the Croats", and to Duke Michael of Zahumlje, asking them to follow the instructions as articulated by John’s legates.

The result was a synod held in Split in 925, which confirmed John’s request; it forbade the ordination of anyone ignorant of Latin, and forbade Mass to be said in the Slav tongue, except when there was a shortage of priests. The decrees of the synod were sent to Rome for John’s confirmation, who confirmed them all except for the ruling which placed the Croatian Bishop of Nona under the jurisdiction of the Archbishop of Spalatro. He summoned the parties to see him at Rome, but they were unable to attend, forcing John to send some papal legates to settle the matter, which were only resolved by Pope Leo VI after John’s deposition and death.

Around the same time, Tsar Simeon I of Bulgaria made overtures to John, offering the renounce his nation’s obedience to the Patriarch of Constantinople, and place his kingdom under the ecclesiastical authority of the popes at Rome. John sent two legates, who only made it as far as Constantinople, but whose letters urging Simeon to come to terms with the Byzantine Empire were delivered to him. However, John did confirm Simeon’s title of Tsar (emperor), and it was John’s representatives who crowned Simeon’s son Peter I of Bulgaria as Tsar in 927. Finally, John sent a legate to act as intermediary to attempt to stop a war between the Bulgarians and Croatians.

== Affairs in western Europe ==
John was just as vigorous in his activities in Western Europe. Early on in his pontificate he gave his support to King Conrad I of Germany in his struggles against the German dukes. He sent a papal legate to a synod of bishops convoked by Conrad at Altheim in 916, with the result that the synod ordered Conrad’s opponents to present themselves before Pope John at Rome if they did not appear before another synod for judgement, under pain of excommunication.

In 920, John was called upon by Charles the Simple to intervene in the succession in the Bishopric of Liège, when Charles’ candidate Hilduin turned against him and joined Duke Gilbert of Lorraine in rebellion. Charles then tried to replace him with another candidate, Richer of Prüm Abbey, but Hilduin captured Richer, and forced Richer to consecrate him as bishop. John X ordered both men to appear before him at Rome, with the result that John confirmed Richer’s appointment and excommunicated Hilduin. When in 923 Charles was later captured by Count Herbert II of Vermandois, John was the only leader who protested over Charles’ capture; he threatened Herbert with excommunication unless he restored Charles to freedom, but Herbert effectively ignored him. Contemptuous of the pope’s authority, in 925 Herbert had his five-year-old son Hugh made archbishop of Reims, an appointment which John was constrained to accept and confirm, as Herbert declared that if his son were not elected, he would carve up the bishopric and distribute the land to various supporters.

John also supported the spiritual side of the Church, such as his advice to Archbishop Herive of Reims in 914, who asked for advice on converting the Normans to Christianity. He wrote:

"Your letter has filled me at once with sorrow and with joy. With sorrow at the sufferings you have to endure not only from the pagans, but also from Christians; with gladness at the conversion of the Northmen, who once revelled in human blood, but who now, by your words, rejoice that they are redeemed by the life-giving blood of Christ. For this we thank God, and implore Him to strengthen them in the faith. As to how far, inasmuch as they are uncultured, and but novices in the faith, they are to be subjected to severe canonical penances for their relapsing, killing of priests, and sacrificing to idols, we leave to your judgment to decide, as no one will know better than you the manners and customs of this people. You will, of course, understand well enough that it will not be advisable to treat them with the severity required by the canons, lest, thinking they will never be able to bear the unaccustomed burdens, they return to their old errors."

In addition, John supported the monastic reform movement at Cluny Abbey. He confirmed the strict rule of Cluny for the monks there. He then wrote to King Rudolph of France, as well as local bishops and counts, with instructions to restore to Cluny the property of which Guido, abbot of Gigny Abbey, had taken without permission, and to put the monastery under their protection. In 926, he increased the land attached to the Subiaco Abbey in exchange for the monks reciting 100 Kyrie eleisons for the salvation of his soul.

In 924 John X sent a papal legate named Zanello to Spain to investigate the Mozarabic rite. Zanello spoke favourably of the rite, and the pope gave a new approval to it, requiring only to change the words of consecration to that of the Roman one. John’s pontificate saw large numbers of pilgrimages from England to Rome, including Archbishop Wulfhelm of Canterbury in 927. Three years before, in 924, King Æthelstan sent one of his nobles, Alfred, to Rome, on charges of plotting to put out the king’s eyes, where he was supposed to swear an oath before Pope John declaring his innocence of the charges, but he died soon afterwards in Rome. In 917 John also gave the archbishop of Bremen jurisdiction over the bishops in Sweden, Denmark, Norway, Iceland and Greenland.

Finally, during his pontificate, John also restored the Lateran Basilica, which had crumbled in 897.

== Deposition and death ==
The power struggle between John X and Guy of Tuscany and Marozia came to a conclusion in 928. Guy had secretly collected a body of troops, and with them made an attack on the Lateran Palace. Peter was caught off guard, having only a few soldiers with him, and was cut to pieces before his brother's eyes. John was thrown into a dungeon, where he remained until he died. There are two variant traditions surrounding his death; the first has it that he was smothered to death by a pillow in the dungeon within a couple of months of his deposition. Another has it he died sometime in 929 without violence, but through a combination of the conditions of his incarceration and depression.

According to John the Deacon of the Lateran, John X was buried in the atrium of the Lateran Basilica, near the main entrance. He was succeeded by Pope Leo VI in 928.

== Reputation and legacy ==
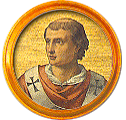
John as portrayed in the Basilica of Saint Paul Outside the Walls in the 19th century

For centuries, John X’s pontificate has been seen as one of the most disgraceful during the Saeculum obscurum. Much of this can be laid at the feet of the Liutprand of Cremona, whose account of the period is both inaccurate and uniformly hostile. His characterisation of John as an unscrupulous cleric who slept his way to the papal chair, becoming the lover of Theodora, and who held the throne of Saint Peter as a puppet of Theophylact I of Tusculum until he was murdered to make way for Marozia’s son John XI, has coloured much of the analysis of his reign, and was used by opponents of the Catholic Church as a propagandist tool.

Thus according to John Foxe, John X was the son of Pope Lando and the lover of the Roman "harlot" Theodora, who had John overthrow his supposed father, and set John up in his place. While according to Louis Marie DeCormenin, John was: "The son of a nun and a priest... more occupied with his lusts and debauchery than with the affairs of Christendom... he was ambitious, avaricious, an apostate, destitute of shame, faith and honour, and sacrificed everything to his passions; he held the Holy See about sixteen years, to the disgrace of humanity."

However, in recent times, his pontificate has been re-evaluated, and he is now seen as a man who attempted to stand against the aristocratic domination of the papacy, who promoted a unified Italy under an imperial ruler, only to be murdered for his efforts.

According to Ferdinand Gregorovius (not known for his sympathies towards the Papacy), John X was the foremost statesman of his age. He wrote:

"John X, however, the man whose sins are known only by report, whose great qualities are conspicuous in history, stands forth amid the darkness of the time as one of the most memorable figures among the Popes. The acts of the history of the Church praise his activity, and his relations with every country of Christendom. And since he confirmed the strict rule of Cluny, they extol him further as one of the reformers of monasticism."

Catholic Church titles
Preceded by Lando	Pope; 914–928	Succeeded by Leo VI
