= Peter (fl. 926) =

Peter was a governor of Rome, Roman consul, and brother of Pope John X. He became consul after the death of Alberic I of Spoleto.

== Sources ==
- George L. Williams. Papal Genealogy: The Families And Descendants Of The Popes
