= John I of Gaeta =

John I (died 933 or 934) was the second hypatos of Gaeta of his dynasty, a son of Dociblis I and Matrona, and perhaps the greatest of medieval Gaetan rulers.

John began his rule as an associate of his father from either 867, right after his father's violent takeover, or 877, when he is first mentioned as co-regent. His father disappears from the annals in 906, but he is only confirmed dead in 914. Nonetheless, the intervening period was John's. He recognised his brother Anatolio as duke of Terracina and sold the castle of Dragoncello to his other brothers.

John began to reverse his father's policy of alliance with the Saracens, and war with Lombard and Greek neighbours. He married his daughters off strategically: Gemma to the Sorrentine prefect Marinus; Maru to the Salernitan nobleman Guaifer; and Matrona to Campolo, son of an important Gaetan family. Probably from the earliest, in 906, but certainly by 914, John associated his own son Docibilis with his rule in a co-regency.

Together, father and son joined the Byzantine strategos Nicholas Picingli's army marching with its Lombard allies (Capua-Benevento and Salerno Principalities) to meet the papal and Spoletan forces. All together, the Christian league attacked the Muslims of the Garigliano and, in the subsequent battle, the Gaetan hypati distinguished themselves in victory. The Gaetan territory was extended to the Garigliano River and John I received the honorific patrikios from Byzantine Emperor Constantine VII.

John continued construction on the palace his father had begun and he associated his grandson, John II, with him in 933. He died within the year and left three other sons (Leo, Constantine, and Peter), but Docibilis, who had taken the ducal title in 930, inherited alone and did not divide the realm. Thus, John was the last ruler of Gaeta who was not a duke.

== Sources ==
- Caravale, Mario (ed). Dizionario Biografico degli Italiani, LV, Ginammi – Giovanni da Crema. Rome, 2000.

| Preceded by Docibilis I | Hypatus of Gaeta; 906 – 933 | Succeeded by Docibilis II |
