= Battle of Garigliano =

915 conflict

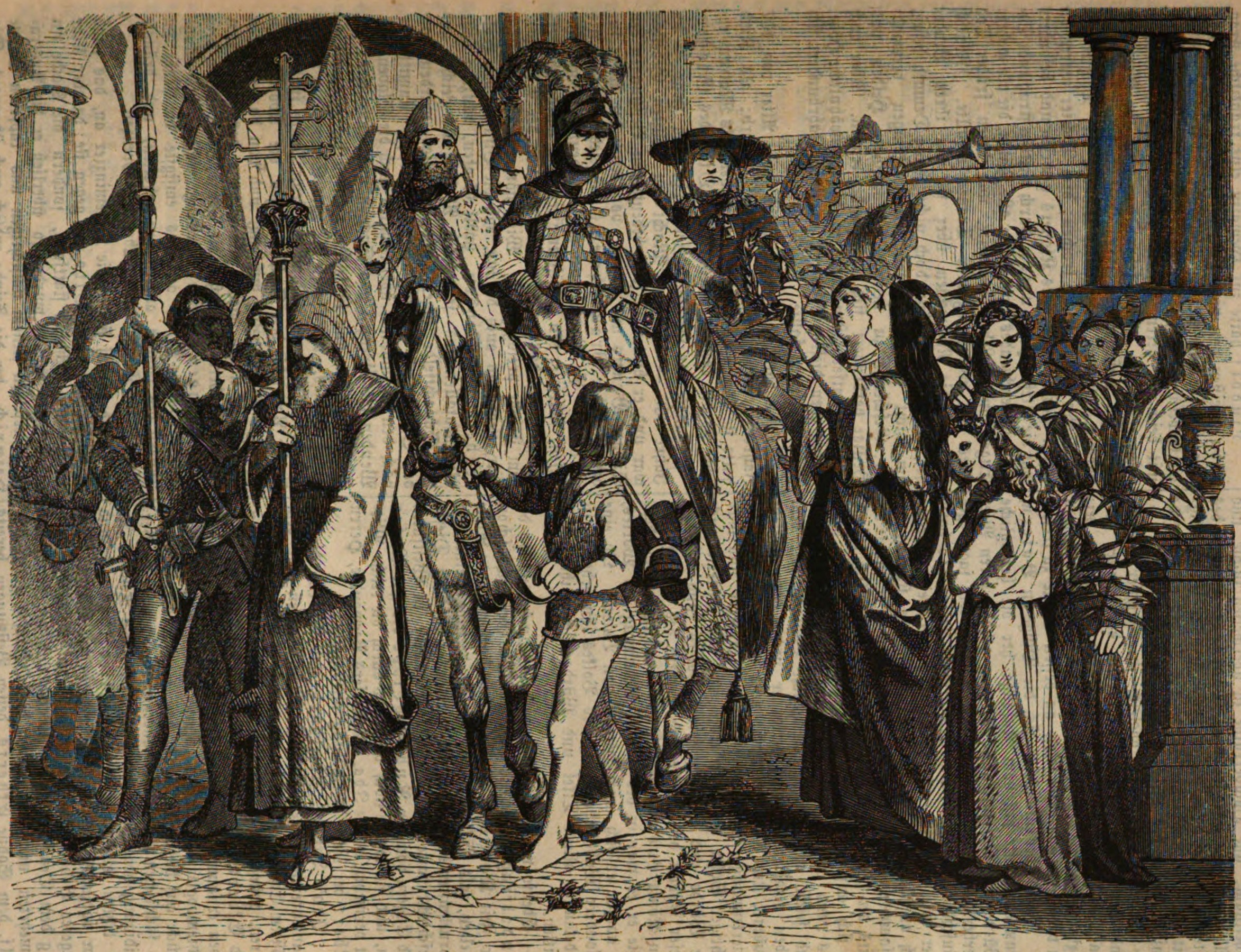
- Triumph of Pope John X in Rome after the battle.
Date	June 915
Location	near the Garigliano River, Italy
Result	Christian victory

Belligerents
Christian League: Papal States; Principality of Benevento; Principality of Capua; Principality of Salerno; (Holy Roman Empire) Kingdom of Italy; (Holy Roman Empire) Duchy of Spoleto; Byzantine Empire; Duchy of Gaeta; Duchy of Amalfi; Duchy of Naples	Saracens (Abbasid caliphate)

Commanders and leaders
Alberic I of Spoleto; Nicholas Picingli; Pope John X Landulf I of Benevento and Capua; Guaimar II of Salerno; John I of Gaeta; Gregory IV of Naples	Alliku

Strength
50,000	40,000

Casualties and losses
Minimal	Heavy

The Battle of Garigliano was fought in 915 between Christian forces and the Saracens. Pope John X personally led the Christian forces into battle. The aim was to destroy the Arab fortress on the Garigliano River, which had threatened central Italy and the outskirts of Rome for nearly 30 years.

== Background ==
After a series of ravaging attacks against the main sites of the Lazio in the second half of the 9th century, the Aghlabids established a colony next to the ancient city of Minturnae, near the Garigliano River. Here they even formed alliances with the nearby Christian princes (notably the hypati of Gaeta), taking advantage of the division between them.

In 909, the Aghlabid Dynasty had been overthrown and replaced by the Fatimids, who assumed control over their territories in North Africa and southern Italy.

Pope John X, however, managed to reunite these princes in an alliance in order to oust the Fatimids from their dangerous strongpoint. The Christian armies united the pope with several south Italian princes of Lombard or Greek extraction, including Guaimar II of Salerno, John I of Gaeta and his son Docibilis, Gregory IV of Naples and his son John, and Landulf I of Benevento and Capua. The King of Italy, Berengar I, sent a support force from Spoleto and the Marche, led by Alberic I, duke of Spoleto and Camerino. The Byzantine Empire participated by sending a strong contingent from Calabria and Apulia under the strategos of Bari, Nicholas Picingli. John X himself led the milites from the Lazio, Tuscany, and Rome.

== Battle ==
The first action took place in northern Lazio, where small bands of ravagers were surprised and destroyed. The Christians scored two more significant victories at Campo Baccano, on the Via Cassia, and in the area of Tivoli and Vicovaro. After these defeats, the Muslims occupying Narni and other strongholds moved back to the main Fatimid stronghold on the Garigliano: this was a fortified settlement (kairuan) whose site, however, has not yet been identified with certainty. The siege lasted for three months, from June to August.

After being pushed out of the fortified camp, the Fatimids retired to the nearby hills. Here they resisted many attacks led by Alberic and Landulf. However, deprived of food and noticing their situation was becoming desperate, in August they attempted a sally to reach the coast and escape to the Emirate of Sicily. According to the chronicles, all were captured and executed.

== Aftermath ==
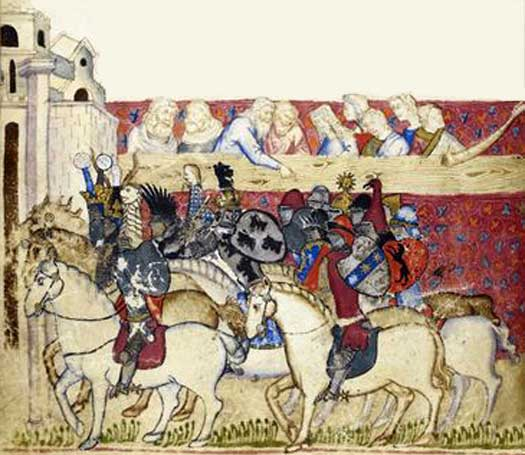
Knights of the Duchy of Naples.

The battle rid central Italy of Arab raiders. Berengar was rewarded with Papal support and eventually the imperial title, while Alberic's prestige after the victorious battle granted him a preeminent role in the future history of Rome. John I of Gaeta was able to expand his duchy to the Garigliano and received the title of patricius from Byzantium, leading his family to proclaim themselves "dukes". In southern Italy, the Byzantines exploited this victory and became the dominant force in the region, forming alliances with most of the south Italian states.
