= Hypatos =

Byzantine title

Hypatos (Greek: ὕπατος; pl.: ὕπατοι, hypatoi) and the variant apo hypatōn (ἀπὸ ὑπάτων; lit. 'from among the consuls') was a Byzantine court dignity, originally the Greek translation of Latin consul (the literal meaning of hypatos is 'the supreme one', which reflects the office, but not the etymology of 'consul'). The dignity arose from the honorary consulships awarded in the late Roman Empire, and survived until the early 12th century. It was often conferred upon the rulers of the south Italian principalities. In Italian documents the term was sometimes Latinised as hypatus or ypatus, and in Italian historiography one finds ipato. The feminine form of the term was hypatissa (ὑπάτισσα).

The creation of ordinary consuls in Late Antiquity was irregular, and after their division in 395, the two halves of the Roman Empire tended to divide the two consulships between them; the office, which had become both purely honorary and quite expensive to hold, sometimes lay vacant for years. The emperors were often ordinary consuls, and after 541, with the exception of the emperor, who assumed the office on his accession, no ordinary consuls were appointed. From that point on, only honorary consulships were granted, and the title declined much in prestige. Throughout the 6th to 9th centuries there is ample sigillographic evidence of functionaries bearing the title, usually attached to mid-level administrative and fiscal posts. In the late 9th-century hierarchy, however, as related by the Kletorologion of Philotheos, it was one of the lower dignities intended for "bearded men" (i.e. non-eunuchs), ranking between the spatharios and the strator. Its badge of office (brabeion), whose award also conferred the dignity, was a diploma. In the Escorial Taktikon, written c. 975, the hypatos appears to be a regular office instead of an honorary dignity, endowed with judicial duties according to Nicolas Oikonomides. In the 11th century, the title rose again in importance, apparently outranking the protospatharios, but disappeared entirely by the mid-12th century.

The title was often conferred to the rulers of south Italian city-states of the Tyrrhenian coast, which recognised Byzantine authority in the 9th through 11th centuries. Eventually, with the waning of Byzantine power in the region, these rulers took on more familiar Latin titles like consul and dux, modern duke. The most famous hypatoi were those of Gaeta. John I of Gaeta won the title patrikios from the Byzantine emperor, as a reward for defeating the Saracens. In Gaeta, the feminine title hypatissa (Italian: ipatessa) was replaced by doukissa (ducissa) during the reign of Docibilis II of Gaeta and his wife Orania, in the first half of the 10th century.

The title was the root of the titles anthypatos (lit. 'vice-consul', the original translation of proconsul) and dishypatos (lit. 'twice consul'), as well as the office of hypatos ton philosophon (ὕπατος τῶν φιλοσόφων, lit. 'chief of the philosophers'), a title given to the head of the imperial university of Constantinople in the 11th-14th centuries.

== Sources ==
- Bury, J. B.; Philotheus (1911). The Imperial Administrative System of the Ninth Century (With a Revised Text of the Kletorologion of Philotheos). London: Oxford University Press.
- Kazhdan, Alexander, ed. (1991). The Oxford Dictionary of Byzantium. Oxford and New York: Oxford University Press. ISBN 0-19-504652-8.
