= Garigliano =

Italian river

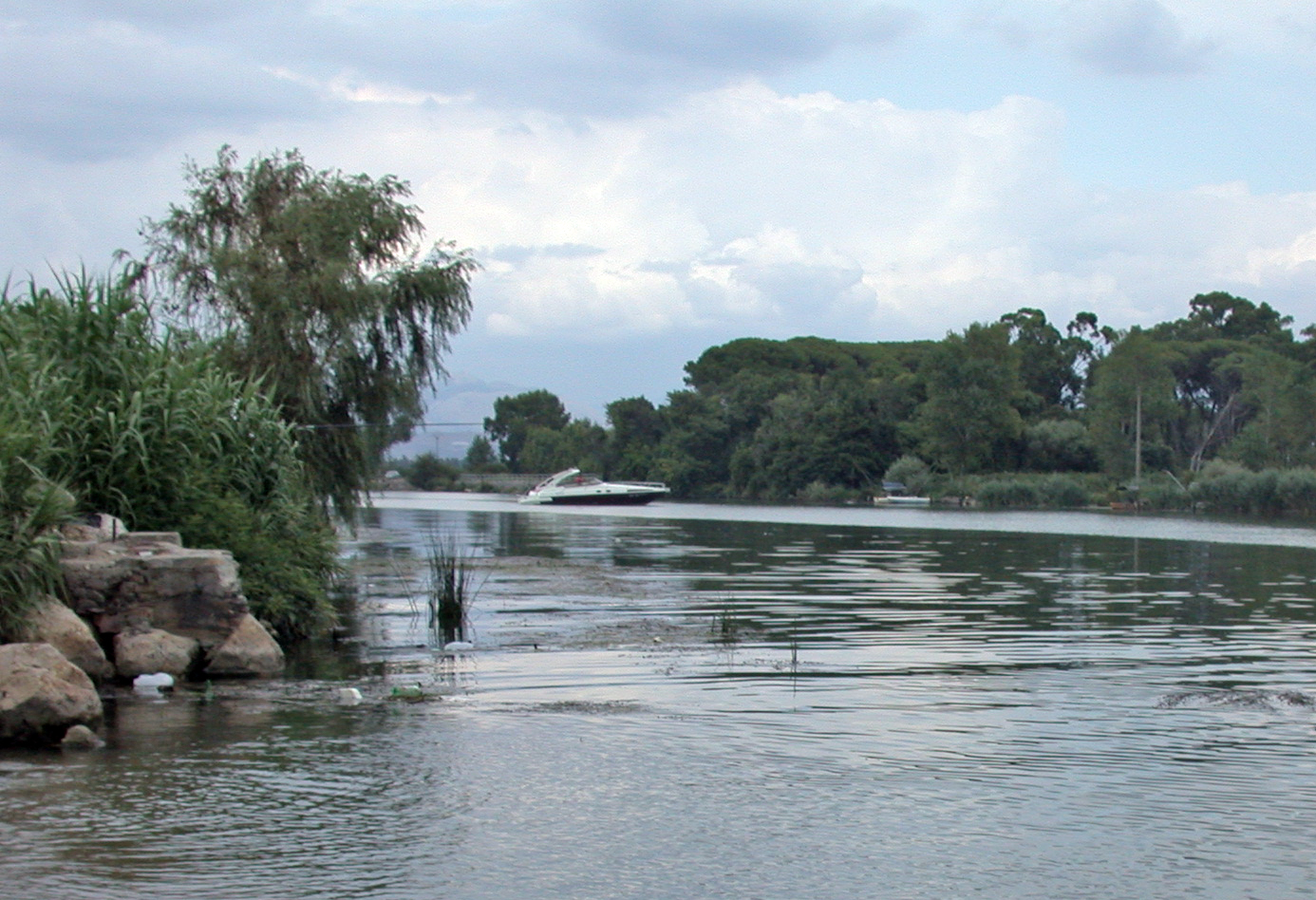
- The Garigliano near its mouth

Location
- Country: Italy

Physical characteristics
- Source
  - location: near Cassino
  - elevation: c. 130 m (430 ft)
- Mouth: Tyrrhenian Sea
  - location: near Minturno
  - coordinates: 41.2229°N 13.7617°E
  - elevation: 0 m (0 ft)
- Length: 38 km (24 mi)(158 km or 98 mi including the Liri)
- Basin size: 5,020 km^{2} (1,940 sq mi)
- Discharge
  - average: 120 m^{3}/s (4,200 cu ft/s)

The Garigliano (Italian pronunciation: [ɡariʎˈʎaːno]) is a river in central Italy.

It forms at the confluence of the rivers Gari (also known as the Rapido) and Liri. Garigliano is actually a deformation of "Gari-Lirano" (which in Italian means something like "Gari from the Liri"). In ancient times the whole course of the Liri and Garigliano was known as the Liris.

For the most part of its 40 km (25 mi) length, the Garigliano River marks the border between the Italian regions of Lazio and Campania. In medieval times, the river (then known as the Verde) marked the southern border of the Papal States.

== Historical significance ==
Western Roman Emperor Majorian engaged a Vandal raiding party in battle at Garigliano in 457.

In the 9th and early 10th centuries, a band of Saracens established themselves on the banks of the river, from where they launched frequent raids on Campania and central Italy. In 915 a coalition of Pope John X, the Byzantines, Franks, Lombards, and Naples defeated the Garigliano Arabs in the Battle of Garigliano.

In 1503, Spanish and French forces fought another battle of Garigliano, in which Piero II de' Medici was drowned, thus control of the Medici family passed to Giovanni de' Medici, later Pope Leo X. The bigger French Army was practically destroyed at little cost to the Spanish, with the remnants later surrendering at Gaeta.

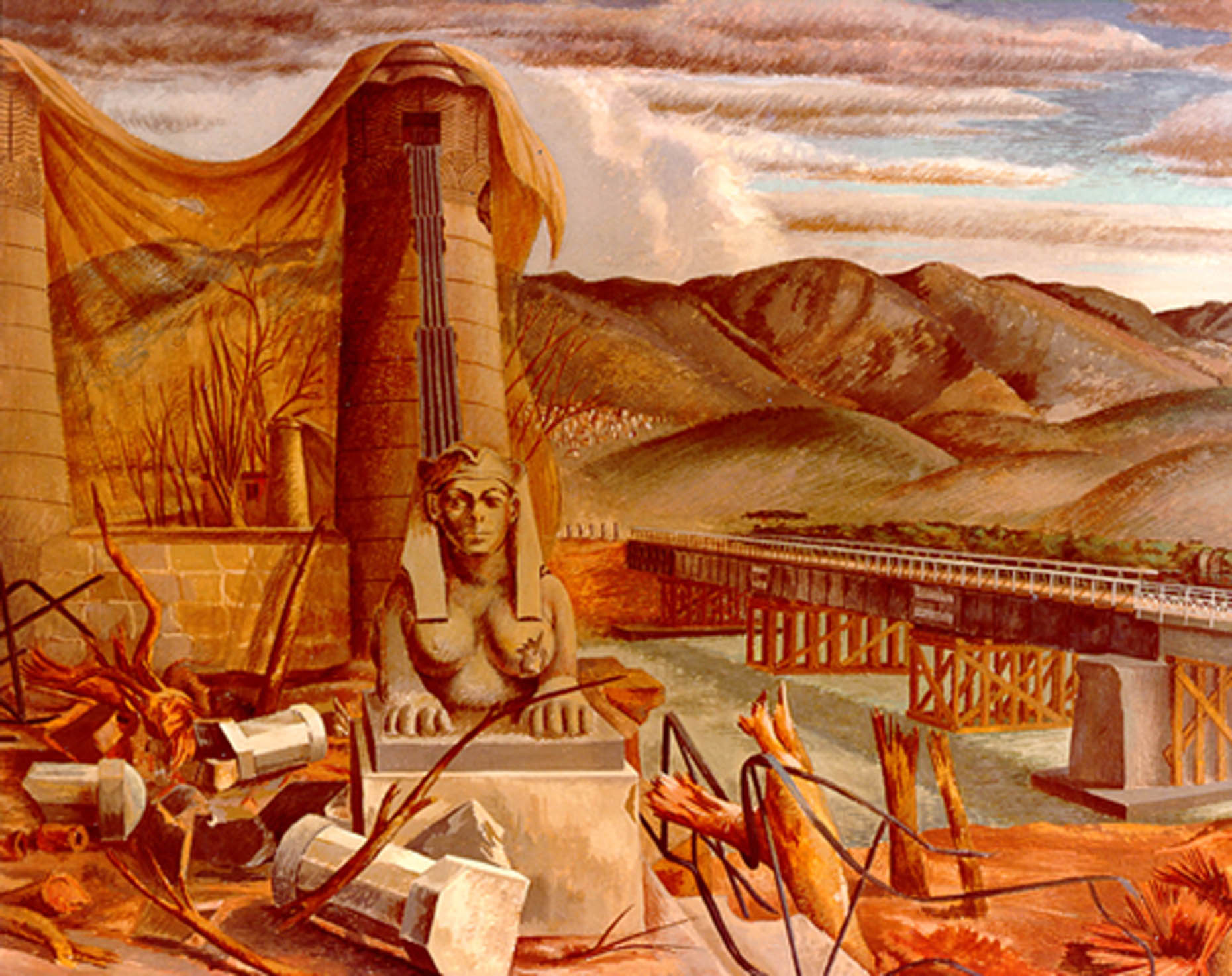
1944, U.S. Army painting.

During the Italian Campaign of World War II, the Liri-Gari-Garigliano rivers stood at the centre of a system of German defensive lines (the most famous of which is the Gustav Line) around which the battle of Monte Cassino took place in 1943–1944. Rumours tell that the waters of the river ran red in the Cassino area during the famous battle, because of the blood of the many corpses of soldiers.

== Nuclear power plant ==
From 1959 until 1982 there was a BWR nuclear power plant named Garigliano near the town Sessa Aurunca.

== See also ==
- Gustav Line
- Pont du Garigliano
- French Expeditionary Corps in Italy
- Battle of Garigliano
