= List of state leaders in the 10th century =

This is a list of state leaders in the 10th century (901–1000) AD, except for the many leaders within the Holy Roman Empire.

== Africa ==
=== Africa: East ===
Ethiopia

- Zagwe dynasty of Ethiopia (complete list) –

- Mara Takla Haymanot, Negus (10th century)
- Tatadim, Negus (10th century)

=== Africa: Northeast ===
Egypt

- Tulunids (complete list) –

- Harun, Amir (896–904)
- Shayban, Amir (904–905)

- Fatimid Caliphate (complete list) –

- Al-Mu'izz li-Din Allah, Caliph (953–975, transfer from Ifriqiya in 973)
- al-Aziz Billah, Caliph (975–996)
- al-Hakim bi-Amr Allah, Caliph (996–1021)

Sudan

- Makuria (complete list) –

- Georgios I, King (late 9th–early 10th century)
- Zakharias IV, King (920–930)
- Kabil, King (c.943)
- Georgios II, King (969–c.1002)
- Raphael, King (1000–c.1006)

=== Africa: Northcentral ===
Ifriqiya

- Rustamid dynasty (complete list) –

- Yusuf Abu Hatim ibn Muhammad Abi l-Yaqzan, Imam (894–895, 899–906)
- Yaqzan ibn Muhammad Abi l-Yaqzan, Imam (906–909)

- Aghlabid dynasty (complete list) –

- Abu Ishaq Ibrahim II ibn Ahmad, Emir (875–902)
- Abu 'l-Abbas Abdallah II ibn Ibrahim, Emir (902–903)
- Abu Mudhar Ziyadat Allah III ibn Abdallah, Emir (903–909)

- Fatimid Caliphate (complete list) –

- Abdullah al-Mahdi Billah, Caliph (909–934)
- Al-Qa'im bi-Amr Allah, Caliph (934–946)
- Al-Mansur bi-Nasr Allah, Caliph (946–953)
- Al-Mu'izz li-Din Allah, Caliph (953–975, transfer to Egypt in 973)

- Zirid dynasty (complete list) –

- Buluggin ibn Ziri, ruler (973–983)
- al-Mansur ibn Buluggin, ruler (983–995)
- Badis ibn Mansur, ruler (995–1016)

=== Africa: Northwest ===
- Barghawata (complete list) –

- Abu Ghafir Muhammad, King (c.888–917)
- Abu al-Ansar Abdullah, King (c.917–961)
- Abu Mansur Isa, King (c.961-?)

- Idrisid dynasty of Morocco (complete list) –

- Yahya ibn al-Qasim, Emir (unknown–905)
- Yahya ibn Idris, Emir (905–922)
- Al-Hasan ibn Muhammad, Emir (928–930)
- Al-Qasim ibn Muhammad, Emir (937–949)
- Abu'l-Aysh ibn al-Qasim Jannun, Emir (949–952)
- Al-Hasan ibn al-Qasim Jannun, Emir (952–974)

- Emirate of Nekor (complete list) –

- Sa'id II ibn Salih, Emir (864–916)
- Salih III ibn Sa'id, Emir (917–927)
- Abd al-Badi' ibn Salih, Emir (927–929)
- Abu Ayyub Isma'il ibn Abd al Malik, Emir (c.930–935)
- Musa ibn Rumi, Emir (c.936–940)
- Abd as-Sami' ibn Jurthum, Emir (940–947)
- Jurthum ibn Ahmad, Emir (947–970)

=== Africa: West ===
Nigeria

- Kingdom of Kano (complete list) –

- Bagauda, King (999–1063)

- Kingdom of Nri (complete list) –

- Eri, King (948–1041)

== Americas ==
=== Americas: Mesoamerica ===
Maya civilization

- Calakmul (complete list) –

- Aj Took', King (c.909)

== Asia ==
=== Asia: Central ===
Afghanistan

- Ghaznavid dynasty (complete list) –

- Sabuktigin, Emir (977–997)
- Ismail, Emir (997–998)
- Mahmud, Emir (998–1002), Sultan (1002–1030)

Uzbekistan

- Samanid Empire (complete list) –

- Isma'il ibn Ahmad, Amir (892–907)
- Ahmad Samani, Amir (907–914)
- Nasr II, Amir (914–943)
- Nuh I, Amir (943–954)
- Ibrahim ibn Ahmad, Amir (947)
- Abd al-Malik I, Amir (954–961)
- Mansur I, Amir (961–976)
- Nuh II, Amir (976–997)
- Abd al-Aziz ibn Nuh, Amir (992)
- Mansur II, Amir (997–999)
- Abd al-Malik II, Amir (999)
- Isma'il Muntasir, Amir (1000–1004)

Tibet

- Guge

- bKra shis mgon, King (fl.947)
- Srong nge Ye shes 'Od, King (?–988 / 959–1036)
- Khor re, King (988–996)
- Lha lde, King (996–1024)

=== Asia: East ===
China: Tang dynasty

- Tang dynasty (complete list) –

- Zhaozong, Emperor (888–904)
- Ai, Emperor (904–907)

Khitan China: Liao dynasty

- Liao dynasty (complete list) –

- Abaoji, Emperor (907–926)
- Taizong, Emperor (926–947)
- Shizong, Emperor (947–951)
- Muzong, Emperor (951–969)
- Jingzong, Emperor (969–982)
- Shengzong, Emperor (982–1031)

Northern China: The Five Dynasties

- Later Liang (complete list) –

- Zhu Wen, Emperor (907–912)
- Zhu Yougui, Emperor (912–913)
- Zhu Youzhen, Emperor (913–923)

- Later Tang (complete list) –

- Li Cunxu, Prince of Jin (908–923), Emperor of Later Tang (923–926)
- Li Siyuan, Emperor (926–933)
- Li Conghou, Emperor (933–934)
- Li Congke, Emperor (934–937)

- Later Jin (complete list) –

- Shi Jingtang, Emperor (936–942)
- Shi Chonggui, Emperor (942–947)

- Later Han (complete list) –

- Liu Zhiyuan, Emperor (947–948)
- Liu Chengyou, Emperor (948–951)

- Later Zhou (complete list) –

- Guo Wei, Emperor (951–954)
- Chai Rong, Emperor (954–959)
- Guo Zongxun, Emperor (959–960)

Southern China: The Ten Kingdoms

- Wu (complete list) –

- Yang Xingmi, Emperor (904–905)
- Yang Wo, Emperor (905–908)
- Yang Longyan, Emperor (908–921)
- Yang Pu, Emperor (921–937)

- Former Shu (complete list) –

- Wang Jian, Emperor (907–918)
- Wang Zongyan, Duke (918–925)

- Chu (complete list) –

- Ma Yin, Prince (907–930)
- Ma Xisheng, Prince (930–932)
- Ma Xifan, Prince (932–947)
- Ma Xiguang, Prince (947–950)
- Ma Xi'e, Prince (950)
- Ma Xichong, Prince (950–951)
- Liu Yan, Prince (951–953)
- Wang Kui, Prince (953–956)
- Zhou Xingfeng, Prince (956–962)
- Zhou Baoquan, Prince (962–963)

- Wuyue (complete list) –

- Qian Liu, King (907–932)
- Qian Yuanguan, King (932–941)
- Qian Hongzuo, King (941–947)
- Qian Hongzong, King (947)
- Qian Chu, King (947–978)

- Min (complete list) –

- Wang Chao, ruler (early 10th century)
- Wang Shenzhi, Emperor (909–925)
- Wang Yanhan, Emperor (925–926)
- Wang Yanjun, Emperor (926–935)
- Wang Jipeng, Emperor (935–939)
- Wang Yanxi, Emperor (939–944)
- Zhu Wenjin, Emperor (944–945)
- Wang Yanzheng, Emperor (943–945)

- Southern Han (complete list) –

- Liu Yan, Emperor (917–941)
- Liu Bin, Emperor (941–943)
- Liu Sheng, Emperor (943–958)
- Liu Chang, Emperor (958–971)

- Jingnan (complete list) –

- Gao Jixing, Prince (909–928)
- Gao Conghui, Prince (928–948)
- Gao Baorong, Prince (948–960)
- Gao Baoxu, Prince (960–962)
- Gao Jichong, Prince (962–963)

- Later Shu (complete list) –

- Meng Zhixiang, Emperor (934)
- Meng Chang, Prince (934–965)

- Southern Tang (complete list) –

- Li Bian, Emperor (937–943)
- Li Jing, Emperor (943–961)
- Li Yu, Emperor (961–975)

- Northern Han (complete list) –

- Liu Chong, Emperor (951–954)
- Liu Jun, Emperor (954–968)
- Liu Ji'en, Emperor (968)
- Liu Jiyuan, Emperor (968–979)

China: Northern Song

- Song dynasty (complete list) –

- Taizu, Emperor (960–976)
- Taizong, Emperor (976–997)
- Zhenzong, Emperor (997–1022)

China: Other states and entities

- Dingnan Jiedushi (complete list) –

- Li Sijian, Jiedushi (c.886–908)
- Li Yichang, Jiedushi (908–909/910)
- Li Renfu, Jiedushi (909/910–933)
- Li Yichao, Jiedushi (933–935)
- Li Yixing, Jiedushi (935–967)
- Li Kerui, Jiedushi (967–978)
- Li Jiyun, Jiedushi (978–980)
- Li Jipeng, Jiedushi (980–982, 988–994)
- Li Jiqian, Jiedushi (998–1004)

- Qi –

- Li Maozhen, Prince (901/907–924)

- Qingyuan Jiedushi (complete list) –

- Liu Congxiao, Jiedushi (949–962)
- Liu Shaozi, Jiedushi (962)
- Zhang Hansi, Jiedushi (962–963)
- Chen Hongjin, Jiedushi (963–978)

- Yan –

- Liu Shouguang, Emperor (911–914)

- Yiwu Circuit –

- Wang Chuzhi, Jiedushi (910–921)

- Zhao (Chengde) –

- Wang Rong, Prince (910–921)

- Dali Kingdom (complete list) –

- Duan Siping, Emperor (937–944)
- Duan Siying, Emperor (944–945)
- Duan Siliang, Emperor (945–951)
- Duan Sicong, Emperor (952–968)
- Duan Sushun, Emperor (968–985)
- Duan Suying, Emperor (985–1009)

Japan

- Heian period Japan (complete list) –

- Daigo, Emperor (897–930)
- Suzaku, Emperor (930–946)
- Murakami, Emperor (946–967)
- Reizei, Emperor (967–969)
- En'yū, Emperor (969–984)
- Kazan, Emperor (984–986)
- Ichijō, Emperor (986–1011)

Korea

- Balhae (complete list) –

- Dae Wihae, King (894–906)
- Dae Inseon, King (906–926)

- Later Baekje –

- Kyŏn Hwŏn, King (892–935)
- Kyŏn Sin-gŏm, King (935–936)

- Unified Silla (complete list) –

- Hyogong, King (897–912)
- Sindeok, King (912–917)
- Gyeongmyeong, King (917–924)
- Gyeongae, King (924–927)
- Gyeongsun, King (927–935)

- Taebong –

- Kung Ye, King (901–918)

- Goryeo (complete list) –

- Taejo, King (918–943)
- Hyejong, King (943–945)
- Jeongjong, King (945–949)
- Gwangjong, King (949–975)
- Gyeongjong, King (975–981)
- Seongjong, King (981–997)
- Mokjong, King (997–1009)

=== Asia: Southeast ===
Cambodia

- Khmer Empire (complete list) –

- Yasovarman I, King (889–910)
- Harshavarman I, King (900–925)
- Ishanavarman II, King (925–928)
- Jayavarman IV, King (928–941)
- Harshavarman II, King (941–944)
- Rajendravarman II, King (944–968)
- Jayavarman V, King (968–1001)

Indonesia

Indonesia: Java

- Sunda Kingdom (complete list) –

- Windusakti Prabu Dewageng, Maharaja (895–913)
- Rakeyan Kemuning Gading Prabu Pucukwesi, Maharaja (913–916)
- Rakeyan Jayagiri Prabu Wanayasa, Maharaja (916–942)
- Prabu Resi Atmayadarma Hariwangsa, Maharaja (942–954)
- Limbur Kancana, Maharaja (954–964)
- Prabu Munding Ganawirya, Maharaja (964–973)
- Prabu Jayagiri Rakeyan Wulung Gadung, Maharaja (973–989)
- Prabu Brajawisesa, Maharaja (989–1012)

- Mataram kingdom (complete list) –

Shailendra dynasty/Sanjaya dynasty
- Balitung, King (899–911)
- Daksa, King (910–919)
- Tulodong, King (919–924)
- Wawa, King (924–929)
Isyana dynasty
- Mpu Sindok, King (c.929–947)
- Isyana Tunggawijaya Queen (947–c.985)
- Makutawangsa Wardhana, King (c.985–991)
- Dharmawangsa, King (991–1016)

Indonesia: Sumatra

- Srivijaya: Shailendra dynasty –

- Śri Udayadityavarman, King (c.960)
- Haji, King (c.980)
- Sri Cudamani Warmadewa, King (c.988)

Indonesia: Lesser Sunda Islands

- Bali Kingdom: Warmadewa dynasty (complete list) –

- Sri Kesari Warmadewa, King (fl.914)
- Ugrasena, King (fl.915–942)
- Tabanendrawarmadewa, King (fl.955–967)
- Indrajayasingha Warmadewa, Co-regent (fl.960)
- Janasadhu Warmadewa, King (fl.975)
- Śri Wijaya Mahadewi, Queen (fl.983)
- Mahendradatta, Queen (before 989–1007)

Malaysia: Peninsular

- Kedah Sultanate (complete list) –

- Darma Raja II, Maharaja (c.880–956)
- Durbar II, Raja (c.956–1136)

Myanmar / Burma

- Early Pagan Kingdom (complete list) –

- Sale Ngahkwe, King (early 10th century)
- Theinhko, King (early 10th century)
- Nyaung-u Sawrahan, King (late 10th century)

Philippines

- Tondo (complete list) –

- Jayadewa, Admiral (c.900)

- Rajahnate of Butuan (complete list) –

- Datu Bantuan, Rajah (?–989)
- Kiling, Rajah (989–1009)

Thailand

- Ngoenyang (complete list) –

- Lao Thoeng, King (early 10th century)
- Lao Tueng, King (mid 10th century)
- Lao Khon, King (late 10th century)

Vietnam

- Champa (complete list) –

- Jaya Sinhavarman I, King (c.898/903)
- Jaya Saktivarman, King (?)
- Bhadravarman II, King (fl. 910)
- Indravarman III, King (c.918–959)
- Jaya Indravarman I, King (959–c.965)
- Paramesvaravarman I, King (c.965–982)
- Indravarman IV, King (982–986)
- Lieou Ki-Tsong, of Annam, King (c.986–989)
- Harivarman II, King (c.989–997)
- Yang Bo Zhan, of Fan, King (?)
- Yang Pu Ku Vijaya, King (c.998–1007)

- Khúc clan (complete list) –

- Khúc Tiên Chủ, Jiedushi (905–907)
- Khúc Trung Chủ, Jiedushi (907–917)
- Khúc Hậu Chủ, Jiedushi (917–930)
- Dương Đình Nghệ, Jiedushi (930–937)
- Kiều Công Tiễn, Jiedushi (937–938)

- Ngô dynasty (complete list) –

- Ngô Quyền, King (938–944)
- Dương Tam Kha, King (944–950)
- Ngô Xương Ngập, Grand Prince (950–954)
- Ngô Xương Văn, King (950–965)

- Đại Việt: Đinh dynasty (complete list) –

- Đinh Bộ Lĩnh, Emperor (968–979)
- Đinh Phế Đế, Emperor (979–980)

- Đại Việt: Early Lê dynasty (complete list) –

- Lê Hoàn, Emperor (980–1005)

=== Asia: South ===
Afghanistan

- Ghaznavids (complete list) –

- Sabuktigin, Emir (977–997)
- Ismail, Emir (997–998)
- Mahmud, Sultan (998–1030)

- Ghurid dynasty (complete list) –

- Amir Suri, Malik (9th–10th century)

Bengal and Northeast India

- Chandra dynasty –

- Chamunda or Bhuyada, King (c.881–908)
- Vairisimha, King (25 years?)
- Ratnaditya, King (15 years?)
- Gaghada, King (c.908–937)

- Kamarupa: Pala dynasty –

- Brahma Pala, King (900–920)
- Ratna Pala, King (920–960)
- Indra Pala, King (960–990)
- Go Pala, King (990–1015)

- Mallabhum (complete list) –

- Yadav Malla, King (906–919)
- Jagat Malla, King (994–1007)

- Pala Empire (complete list) –

- Narayanapala, King (9th–10th century)
- Rajyapala, King (10th century)
- Gopala II, King (10th century)
- Vigrahapala II, King (10th century)
- Mahipala I, King (977–1027)

- Pala dynasty of Kamarupa (complete list) –

- Brahma Pala, King (900–920)
- Ratna Pala, King (920–960)
- Indra Pala, King (960–990)
- Go Pala, King (990–1015)

India

- Amber Kingdom (complete list) –

- Sorha Deva, King (966–1006)

- Chahamanas of Naddula (complete list) –

- Lakshmana, King (c.950–982)
- Shobhita, King (c.982–986)
- Baliraja, King (c.986–990)
- Vigrahapala, King (c.990–994)
- Mahindra, King (c.994–1015)

- Chahamanas of Shakambhari (complete list) –

- Vakpatiraja I, King (c.917–944)
- Simharaja, King (c.944–971)
- Vigraharaja II, King (c.971–998)
- Durlabharaja II, King (c.998–1012)

- Chandelas of Jejakabhukti (complete list) –

- Rahila, King (c.885–905)
- Shri Harsha, King (c.905–925)
- Yasho-Varman, King (c.925–950)
- Dhanga-Deva, King (c.950–999)
- Ganda-Deva, King (c.999–1002)

- Chaulukya dynasty of Gujarat (complete list) –

- Mularaja, King (941–996)
- Chamundaraja, King (996–1008)

- Eastern Chalukyas (complete list) –

- Chalukya Bhima I, King (892–921)
- Vijayaditya IV, King (921)
- Amma I, King (921–927)
- Beta Vijayaditya V, King (927)
- Tala I, King (927)
- Vikramaditya II, King (927–928)
- Bhima II, King (928)
- Yuddhamalla II, King (928–935)
- Chalukya Bhima II, King (935–947)
- Amma II, King (947–970)
- Tala I, King (970)
- Danarnava, King (970–973)
- Jata Choda Bhima, King (973–999)
- Shaktivarman I, King (1000–1011)

- Western Chalukya Empire (complete list) –

- Tailapa II, King (957–997)
- Satyashraya, King (997–1008)

- Chera Perumals of Makotai (complete list) –

- Goda Ravi, King (c.883–913)
- Kotha Kotha Kerala Kesari, King (c.913–c.943)
- Indu Kotha, King (943–962)
- Bhaskara Ravi Manukuladithya, King (962–1021)

- Chola dynasty (complete list) –

- Aditya I, King (870–907)
- Parantaka I, King (907–950)
- Gandaraditya, King (950–957)
- Arinjaya, King (956–957)
- Parantaka Chola II, King (957–970)
- Uttama Chola, King (970–985)
- Rajaraja I, King (c.985–1014)

- Eastern Ganga dynasty (complete list) –

- Gunamaharnava I, King (c.895–939)
- Vajrahasta II (or Anangabhimadeva I), King (c.895–939)
- Gundama, King (939–942)
- Kamarnava I, King (942–977)
- Vinayaditya, King (977–980)
- Vajrahasta Aniyakabhima, King (980–1015)

- Western Ganga dynasty (complete list) –

- Rachamalla II, King (870–907)
- Ereganga Neetimarga II, King (907–921)
- Narasimha, King (921–933)
- Rachamalla III, King (933–938)
- Butuga II, King (938–961)
- Marulaganga Neetimarga, King (961–963)
- Marasimha II Satyavakya, King (963–975)
- Rachamalla IV Satyavakya, King (975–986)
- Rachamalla V, King (986–999)
- Rakkasa Ganga, King (985–1024)

- Garhwal Kingdom (complete list) –

- Bhakti Pal, King (895–919)
- Jayachand Pal, King (920–948)
- Prithvi Pal, King (949–971)
- Medinisen Pal, King (973–995)
- Agasti Pal, King (995–1014)

- Gurjara-Pratihara dynasty (complete list) –

- Mahendrapala I, King (885–910)
- Bhoja II, King (910–913)
- Mahipala I, King (913–944)
- Mahendrapala II, King (944–948)
- Devapala, King (948–954)
- Vinayakapala, King (954–955)
- Mahipala II, King (955–956)
- Vijayapala II, King (956–960)
- Rajapala, King (960–1018)

- Kalachuris of Tripuri (complete list) –

- Shankaragana II, King (890–910)
- Balaharsha, King (910–915)
- Yuvaraja-deva I, King (915–945)
- Lakshmanaraja II, King (945–970)
- Shankaragana III, King (970–980)
- Yuvarajadeva II, King (980–990)
- Kokalla II, King (990–1015)

- Kumaon kingdom: Katyuri (complete list) –

- Nimbarta Dev, King (900–915)
- Istanga, King (915–930)
- Lalitasura Dev, King (930–955)
- Bhu Dev, King (955–970)
- Salonaditya, King (970–985)
- Ichchhata Dev, King (985–1000)
- Deshat Dev, King (1000–1015)

- Pala dynasty of Kamarupa (complete list) –

- Brahma Pala, King (900–920)
- Ratna Pala, King (920–960)
- Indra Pala, King (960–990)
- Go Pala, King (990–1015)

- Pandyan dynasty (complete list) –

- Maravarman Rajasimha II, King (900–920)

- Paramaras of Chandravati (complete list) –

- Utpala-raja, King (c.910–930)
- Arnno-raja, or Aranya-raja, King (c.930–950)
- Krishna-raja, King (c.950–979)
- Dhara-varaha or Dharani-varaha, King (c.970–990)
- Dhurbhata, King (c.990–1000)

- Paramara dynasty of Malwa (complete list) –

- Vakpati I, King (9th–10th century)
- Vairisimha II, King (10th century)
- Siyaka II, King (948–972)
- Vakpati II, King (972–990s)
- Sindhuraja, King (990s–1010)

- Rashtrakuta dynasty -

- Krishna II, King (878–914)
- Indra III, King (914–929)
- Amoghavarsha II, King (929–930)
- Govinda IV, King (930–936)
- Amoghavarsha III, King (936–939)
- Krishna III, King (939–967)
- Khottiga Amoghavarsha, King (967–972)
- Karka II, King (972–973)
- Indra IV, King (973–982)

Pakistan

- Hindu Shahi (complete list) –

- Jayapala, King (964–1001)

Sri Lanka

- Anuradhapura kingdom, Sri Lanka (complete list) –

- Sena II, King (866–901)
- Udaya I, King (901–912)
- Kassapa IV, King (912–929)
- Kassapa V, King (929–939)
- Dappula IV, King (939–940)
- Dappula V, King (940–952)
- Udaya II, King (952–955)
- Sena III, King (955–964)
- Udaya III, King (964–972)
- Sena IV, King (972–975)
- Mahinda IV, King (975–991)
- Sena V, King (991–1001)

=== Asia: West ===
Mesopotamia

- Abbasid Caliphate, Baghdad (complete list) –

- al-Mu'tadid, Caliph (892–902)
- al-Muktafi, Caliph (902–908)
- al-Muqtadir, Caliph (908–929, 929–932)
- al-Qahir, Caliph (929, 932–934)
- al-Radi, Caliph (934–940)
- al-Muttaqi, Caliph (940–944)
- al-Mustakfi, Caliph (944–946)
- al-Muti, Caliph (946–974)
- at-Ta'i, Caliph (974–991)
- al-Qadir, Caliph (991–1031)

- Hamdanid dynasty (complete list) –

Emirate of Mosul
- Nasir al-Dawla, Emir (929–967)
- Abu Taghlib, Emir (967–978)
- Abu Tahir Ibrahim and Abu Abdallah al-Husayn (989–990)
Emirate of Aleppo
- Sayf al-Dawla, Emir (945–967)
- Sa'd al-Dawla, Emir (967–991)
- Sa'id al-Dawla, Emir (991–1002)

Persia

- Buyid Empire (complete list) –

Buyids in Fars
- Imad al-Dawla, Emir (934–949)
- 'Adud al-Dawla, Emir (949–983)
- Sharaf al-Dawla, Emir (983–989)
- Samsam al-Dawla, Emir (989–998)
- Baha' al-Dawla, Emir (998–1012)
- Sultan al-Dawla, Emir (1012–1024)

Buyids in Ray
- Rukn al-Dawla, Emir (935–976)
- Fakhr al-Dawla, Emir (976–980, 984–997)
- Mu'ayyad al-Dawla, Emir (980–983)
- Majd al-Dawla, Emir (997–1029)

Buyids in Iraq
- Mu'izz al-Dawla, Emir (945–967)
- 'Izz al-Dawla, Emir (966–978)
- 'Adud al-Dawla, Emir (978–983)
- Samsam al-Dawla, Emir (983–987)
- Sharaf al-Dawla, Emir (987–989)
- Baha' al-Dawla, Emir (989–1012)

- Saffarid dynasty (complete list) –

- Amr ibn al-Layth, Amir (879–901)
- Tahir ibn Muhammad ibn Amr, Amir (901–908)
- al-Layth ibn 'Ali, Amir (908–910)
- Muhammad ibn Ali ibn al-Layth, Amir (910–911)
- Al-Mu'addal, Amir (911)
- Amr ibn Ya'qub, Amir (912–913)
- Ahmad ibn Muhammad, Amir (922–963)
- Khalaf ibn Ahmad, Amir (963–1002)

- Samanid Empire (complete list) –

- Isma'il ibn Ahmad, Amir (892–907)
- Ahmad Samani, Amir (907–914)
- Nasr II, Amir (914–943)
- Nuh I, Amir (943–954)
- Ibrahim ibn Ahmad, Amir (947)
- Abd al-Malik I, Amir (954–961)
- Mansur I, Amir (961–976)
- Nuh II, Amir (976–997)
- Abd al-Aziz ibn Nuh, Amir (992)
- Mansur II, Amir (997–999)
- Abd al-Malik II, Amir (999)
- Isma'il Muntasir, Amir (1000–1004)

- Ziyarid dynasty (complete list) –

- Mardavij, Emir (930–935)
- Vushmgir, Emir (935–967)
- Bisutun, Emir (967–977)
- Qabus, Emir (977–981)
- Buyid, Emir occupation (977–997)
- Qabus, Emir (997–1012)

Yemen

- Yemeni Zaidi State (complete list) –

- al-Hadi ila'l-Haqq Yahya, Imam (897–911)
- al-Murtada Muhammad, Imam (911–913)
- an-Nasir Ahmad, Imam (913–934 or 937)
- al-Muntakhab al-Hasan, Imam (934–936 or 939)
- al-Mukhtar al-Qasim, Imam (936–956)
- al-Mansur Yahya, Imam (934–976)
- ad-Da'i Yusuf, Imam (977–999)
- al-Mansur al-Qasim al-Iyyani, Imam (999–1002)

== Europe ==
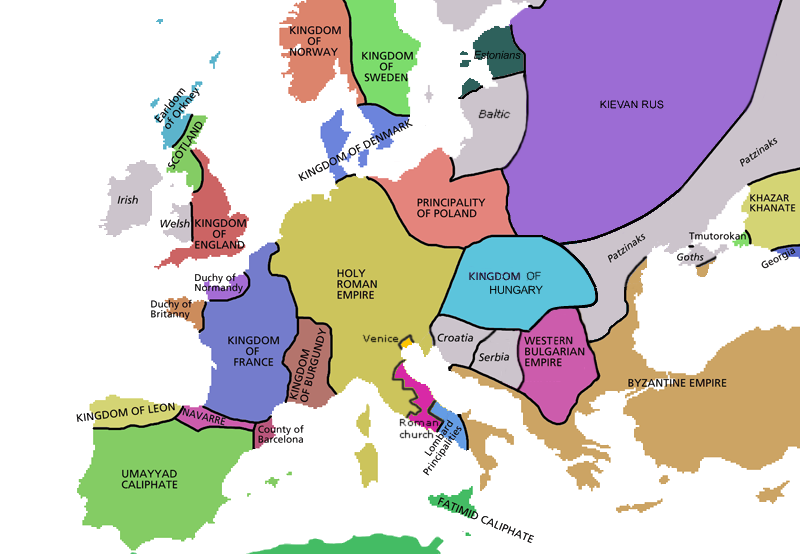
States of Europe in 998 AD.

=== Europe: Balkans ===
- First Bulgarian Empire (complete list) –

- Simeon I, Emperor (893–927)
- Peter I, Emperor (927–969)
- Boris II, Emperor (969–971)
- Roman, Emperor (977–991)
- Samuel, Emperor (997–1014)

- Byzantine Empire (complete list) –

- Leo VI the Wise, Co-Emperor (870–886), Emperor (886–912)
- Alexander, Emperor (912–913)
- Constantine VII Porphyrogennetos, Junior Co-Emperor (908–913, 920–945), Emperor (913–920, 945–959)
- Romanos I Lekapenos, Emperor (920–944)
- Christopher Lekapenos, Junior Co-Emperor (921–931)
- Stephen Lekapenos, Junior Co-Emperor (924–945)
- Constantine Lekapenos, Junior Co-Emperor (924–945)
- Romanos II, Emperor (959–963)
- Nikephoros II Phokas, Emperor (963-969)
- John I Tzimiskes, Emperor (969-976)
- Basil II, Junior Co-Emperor (960–976), Emperor (976–1025)

- Emirate of Crete (complete list) –

- Muhammad ibn Shu'ayb al-Zarkun, Emir (c.895–910)
- Yusuf ibn Umar ibn Shu'ayb, Emir (c.910–915)
- Ali ibn Yusuf ibn Umar, Emir (c.915–925)
- Ahmad ibn Umar, Emir (c.925–940)
- Shu'ayb ibn Ahmad, Emir (940–943)
- Ali ibn Ahmad, Emir (943–949)
- Abd al-Aziz ibn Shu'ayb, Emir (949–961)

- Duchy / Kingdom of Croatia (complete list) –

- Muncimir, Duke (892–910)
- Tomislav, Duke (910–925), King (c.925–928)
- Trpimir II, King (928–935)
- Krešimir I, King (935–945)
- Miroslav, King (945–949)
- Michael Krešimir II, King (949–969)
- Stephen Držislav, King (969–997)
- Svetoslav Suronja, King (997–1000)
- Gojslav, co-King (1000–c.1020)

- Principality of Serbia (complete list) –

- Petar, Prince (892–917)
- Pavle, Prince (917–921)
- Zaharija, Prince (922–924)
- Časlav, Prince (c.927–c.960)

- Duklja (complete list) –

- Petar, Archon (c.1000)
- Jovan Vladimir, Prince (c.1000–1016)

=== Europe: British Isles ===
==== Great Britain: Scotland ====
- Kingdom of Scotland/ Kingdom of Alba (complete list) –

- Constantine II (III), King (900–943)
- Malcolm I, King (943–954)
- Indulf, King (954–962)
- Dub, King (962–967)
- Cuilén, King (967–971)
- Kenneth II, King (971–995)
- Amlaíb, rival King (973–977)
- Constantine III (IV), King (995–997)
- Kenneth III, King (997–1005)

- Kingdom of Strathclyde (complete list) –

- Dyfnwal (died 908×915)
- Owain ap Dyfnwal (fl. 934)
- Dyfnwal ab Owain (died 975)
- Rhydderch ap Dyfnwal (fl. 971), possible King
- Máel Coluim (died 997)
- Owain ap Dyfnwal (died 1015), possible King

- Kingdom of the Isles (complete list) –

- Ragnall ua Ímair, King (c.914–921) to 921?
- Gebeachan, King (?–937)
- Maccus mac Arailt, King (fl.971–974)
- Gofraid mac Arailt, King (?–989)
- Gilli, Chieftain (990–?)

==== Great Britain: Northumbria ====
- Kingdom of Northumbria (complete list) –

- Cnut, King (c.900)
- Æthelwold, King (900–902)
- Airdeconut, King (c.902)
- Eowils, co-King (902–910)
- Halfdan II, co-King (902–910)
- Ingwær, co-King (?–910)
- Ragnall ua Ímair, King (918–921)
- Sitric Cáech, King (921–927)
- Gofraid ua Ímair, King (927)
- Olaf Guthfrithson, King (939–941)
- Sitric II, King (c.942)
- Ragnall Guthfrithson, King (943–944)
- Eric Bloodaxe, King (947–948, 952–954)
- Amlaíb Cuarán, King (949–952)

==== Great Britain: England ====
- The Britons (complete list) –

- Anarawd ap Rhodri, King (878–916)
- Idwal Foel, King (916–942)
- Hywel Dda, King (942–950)
- Dyfnwal ab Owain, King (962–975)
- Maredudd ab Owain, King (986–999)

- Kingdom of East Anglia (complete list) –

- Eohric, King (890–902)
- Æthelwold, Sub-King (902)
- Guthrum II, King (902–918)

- Mercia (complete list) –

- Æthelred II, Lord (c.881–911)
- Æthelflæd, Lady (911–918)
- Ælfwynn, Lady (918)

- Kingdom of Wessex / Kingdom of England (complete list) –

- Edward the Elder, King of Wessex (899–924)
- Ælfweard, King of Wessex (924)
- Æthelstan, King of the Anglo-Saxons (924–927), King of the English (927–939)
- Edmund I, King (939–946)
- Eadred, King (946–955)
- Eadwig, King (955–959)
- Edgar, King (959–975)
- Edward the Martyr, King (975–978)
- Æthelred the Unready, King (978–1013, 1014–1016)

==== Great Britain: Wales ====
- Glywysing and Morgannwg (complete list) –

- Arthfael Hen ap Rhys, King of Glywysing (785–c.825)
- Rhys ap Arthfael, King of Glywysing (c.830–c.840)
- Hywel ap Rhys, King of Glywysing (c.840–886)
- Owain ap Hywel, King of Glywysing (886–c.930)
- Gruffydd ab Owain, King of Glywysing (c.930–934)
- Cadwgan ab Owain, King of Glywysing (c.930–950)
- Morgan Hen ab Owain, the Old, King of Morgannwg (c.942–974)
- Owain ap Morgan, King of Glywysing (974–c.983)
- Rhys ab Owain, King of Glywysing (c.990–c.1000)
- Ithel the Black, King of Glywysing (990)
- Iestyn ab Owain, King of Glywysing (c.990–c.1015)

- Kingdom of Gwynedd (complete list) –

- Anarawd ap Rhodri, King (878–916)
- Idwal Foel, King (916–942)
- Hywel Dda, King (942–950)
- Iago ab Idwal, King (950–979)
- Ieuaf ab Idwal, King (950–969)
- Hywel ab Ieuaf, King (974–985)
- Cadwallon ab Ieuaf, King (985–986)
- Maredudd ab Owain, King (986–999)
- Cynan ap Hywel, King (999–1005)

- Gwent (complete list) –

- Brochfael ap Meurig, King (880–920)
- Arthfael ap Hywel, King (?–916/927)
- Owain ap Hywel, King (920–930)
- Gruffydd ab Owain, King (?–c.935)
- Cadwgan ab Owain, King (?–951)
- Nowy ap Gwriad, King (c.950–c.970)
- Arthfael ap Nowy, King (c.970–983)
- Rhodri ap Elisedd and Gruffydd ap Elisedd, co-Kings (983–c.1015)

- Kingdom of Powys (complete list) –

- Llywelyn ap Merfyn, King (900–942)
- Hywel Dda, King (942–950)
- Owain ap Hywel Dda, King (950–986)
- Maredudd ap Owain, King (986–999)
- Llywelyn ap Seisyll, King (999–1023)

- Kingdom of Dyfed (complete list) –

- Llywarch ap Hyfaidd, King (893–904)
- Rhodri ap Hyfaidd, King (904–905)
- Hywel Dda, King (905–909)

- Seisyllwg (complete list) –

- Cadell ap Rhodri (878–909)

- Deheubarth (complete list) –

- Hywel Dda, King (920–950)
- Owain ap Hywel, King (950–986)

- Rhodri ap Hywel, King (950–953)
- Edwin ap Hywel, King (950–954)

- Maredudd ab Owain, King (986–999)
- Cynan ap Hywel, prince of Gwynedd (999–1005)
- Hywel ab Owain, King (c.990–c.1043)

==== Ireland ====
- Ireland (complete list) –

- Flann Sinna, High King (877–914)
- Niall Glúndub, High King (915–917)
- Donnchad Donn, High King (918–942)
- Congalach Cnogba, High King (943–954)
- Domnall ua Néill, High King (955–978)
- Máel Sechnaill mac Domnaill, High King (979–1002, 1014–1022)

- Kingdom of Ailech (complete list) –

- Domnall mac Áeda, King (887–915)
- Niall Glúndub mac Áeda, King (896–919)
- Flaithbertach mac Domnaill, King (916–919)
- Fergal mac Domnaill, King (919–938)
- Muirchertach mac Néill, King (938–943)
- Domnall mac Muirchertaig ua Néill, King (943–980)
- Flaithbertach mac Muirchertaig meic Néill, King (943–949)
- Flaithbertach mac Conchobair, King (956–962)
- Tadg mac Conchobair, King (956–962)
- Conn mac Conchobair, King (956–962)
- Murchad Glun re Lar mac Flaithbertaigh, King (962–972)
- Fergal mac Domnaill meic Conaing, King (980–989)
- Áed mac Domnaill Ua Néill, King (989–1004)

- Airgíalla (complete list) –

- Maol Craoibh ua Duibh Sionach, King (?–917)
- Fogarthach mac Donnegan, King (?–947)
- Egneach mac Dalach, King (?–961)
- Donnacan mac Maelmuire, King (?–970)
- Mac Eiccnigh mac Dalagh, King (?–998)
- Mac Leiginn mac Cerbaill, King (?–1022)

- Kingdom of Breifne (complete list) –

- Flann mac Tighearnáin, Lord (c.910)
- Cernachan mac Tighearnáin, King (?–931)
- Conghalach mac Cathaláin, Lord (c.935)
- Cléircén son of Tigernán, King (c.937)
- Fergal ua Ruairc, King (?)
- (Sean) Fergal Ó Ruairc, King (c.964–967)
- Niall Ó Ruairc, heir (1000–1001)

- Connachta (complete list) –

- Cathal mac Conchobair, King (900–925)
- Tadg mac Cathail, King (925–956)
- Fergal Ua Ruairc, King (956–967)
- Conchobar mac Tadg, King (967–973)
- Cathal mac Tadg, King (973)
- Cathal mac Conchobar mac Taidg, King (973–1010)

- Kingdom of Dublin (complete list) –

- Ímar ua Ímair, King (?–904)
- Sitric Cáech, King (917–920)
- Gofraid ua Ímair, King (921–934)
- Olaf Guthfrithson, King (934–939)
- Blácaire mac Gofraid, King (939–945, 947–948)
- Amlaíb Cuarán, King (945–947)
- Gofraid mac Sitriuc, King (?–951)
- Glúniairn, King (?–989)
- Ivar of Waterford, possible king (989–993), King (994–995)
- Sigtrygg Silkbeard, King (989/995–1036)

- Leinster (complete list) –

- Cerball mac Muirecáin, King (885–909)
- Augaire mac Aililla, King (909–917)
- Faelan mac Muiredach, King (917–942)
- Lorcán mac Fáelán, King (942–943)
- Bran Fionn mac Máelmórda, King (943–947)
- Túathal mac Úgaire, King (947–958)
- Cellach mac Faelan, King (958–966)
- Murchad mac Bran Fionn, King (966–972)
- Úgaire mac Túathail, King (972–978)
- Domnall Claen, King (978–984)
- Donnchad mac Domnall Claen, King (984–1003)

- Magh Luirg (complete list) –

- Máel Ruanaid Mór mac Tadg, King (fl.956)
- Muirchertach mac Maelruanaidh Mor, King (?)

- Kingdom of Meath (complete list) –

- Flann Sinna mac Maíl Sechnaill, King (877–916)
- Conchobar mac Flainn, King (916–919)
- Donnchad Donn mac Flainn, King (919–944)
- Oengus mac Donnchada, King (944–945/946)
- Donnchad mac Domnaill, King (945/946–950)
- Fergal Got mac Oengussa, King (c.950)
- Aed mac Mael Ruanaid, King (c.950–951)
- Domnall mac Donnchada, King (951–952)
- Carlus mac Cuinn, King (952–960)
- Donnchad Finn mac Aeda, King (960–974)
- Muirchertach mac Mael Sechnaill, King (974–c.976)
- Máel Sechnaill mac Domnaill, King (975/976–1022)

- Kingdom of Munster (complete list) –

- Finguine Cenn nGécan mac Loégairi, King (895–902)
- Cormac mac Cuilennáin, King (902–908)
- Flaithbertach mac Inmainén, King (908–944)
- Lorcán mac Coinlígáin, King (944–?)
- Cellachán Caisil, King (?–954)
- Máel Fathardaig mac Flann, King (954–957)
- Dub-dá-Bairenn mac Domnaill, King (957–959)
- Fer Gráid mac Clérig, King (959–961)
- Donnchad mac Cellacháin, King (959–963)
- Máel Muad mac Brain, King (959–970, 976–978)
- Ivar of Limerick, King (960–977)
- Mathgamain mac Cennétig, King (970–976)
- Brian Boru, King (978–1014)

- Uí Maine (complete list) –

- Mughroin mac Sochlachan, King (?–904)
- Sochlachan mac Diarmata, King (?–909)
- Murchadh mac Sochlachan, King (?–936)
- Murchadh mac Aodha, King (?–960)
- Geibennach mac Aedha, King (?–973)
- Muirgus mac Domnaill, King (?–986)
- Tadhg Mór Ua Cellaigh, King (?–1014)

- Ulaid / Ulster (complete list) –

- Áed mac Eochocáin, King (898–919)
- Dubgall mac Áeda, King (919–925)
- Loingsech mac Cinn Etig, King (925–932)
- Eochaid mac Conaill, King (932–937)
- Matudán mac Áeda, King (937–950)
- Ardgal mac Matudáin, King (950–970)
- Niall mac Áeda, King (970–971)
- Áed mac Loingsig, King (971–972)
- Eochaid mac Ardgail, King (972–1004)

=== Europe: Central ===
Holy Roman Empire in Germany

See also List of state leaders in the 10th-century Holy Roman Empire

- Holy Roman Empire, Kingdom of Germany (complete list, complete list) –

- Louis the Child, King (899–911)
- Conrad I, King (911–918)
- Henry I, King (919–936)
- Otto I, King (936–973), Holy Roman Emperor (962–973)
- Otto II, King (961–983), Holy Roman Emperor (967–983)
- Otto III, King (983–1002), Holy Roman Emperor (996–1002)

Hungary

- Principality of Hungary (complete list) –

- Árpád, Grand Prince (c.895–c.907)
- Zoltán, Grand Prince (c.907–c.948)
- Fajsz, Grand Prince (c. 948)
- Taksony, Grand Prince (c.955–c.973)
- Géza, Grand Prince (c.973–997)
- Stephen I, Grand Prince (997–1000), King (1000–1038)

Moravia

- Great Moravia (complete list) –

- Mojmír II, Duke (894–906)

Poland

- Civitas Schinesghe (complete list) –

- Lestek, Duke (early 10th century)
- Siemomysł, Duke (mid–10th century)
- Mieszko I, Duke (960–992)
- Bolesław I, Duke (992–1025), King (1025)

- Kingdom of Poland (1025–1385) (complete list) –

- Bolesław I the Brave, Duke (992–1025), King (1025)

=== Europe: East ===
- Volga Bulgaria (complete list) –

- Almış, Emir (895–925)
- Mikail bine Cäğfär, ruler (925–943)
- Äxmäd bine Cäğfär, ruler (943–950)
- Abdulla bine Mikail, ruler (950–970)
- Talib bine Äxmäd, ruler (970–976)
- Mö'min bine Äxmäd, ruler (976–980)
- Abd ar-Rahman bine Mö'min, ruler (980–1006)

- Khazar Khaganate (complete list) –

- Aaron I, ruler (c.900)
- Menahem, ruler (early 10th-century)
- Benjamin, ruler (c.920)
- Aaron II, ruler (late 920s–940)
- Joseph, ruler (940–965)
- David of Taman, ruler (c.986–988)
- Georgius Tzul, ruler (?–1016)

- Kievan Rus' (complete list) –

- Oleg of Novgorod, Prince (882–912)
- Igor I, Prince (912–945)
- Olga, Regent, Consort (945–962)
- Sviatoslav I, Prince (962–972)
- Yaropolk I, Prince (972–980)
- Vladimir I the Great, Grand Prince (980–1015)

- Novgorod (complete list) –

- Oleg of Novgorod (879–912)

=== Europe: Nordic ===
Denmark

- Denmark (complete list) –

- Harthacnut I, King (early–10th century)
- Gorm the Old, King (c. 936–c. 958)
- Harald Bluetooth, King (c.958–c.986)
- Sweyn Forkbeard, King (986–1014)

Norway

- Kingdom of Norway (872–1397) (complete list) –

- Harald Fairhair, King (c.872–930)
- Eric Bloodaxe, King (c.929–934)
- Haakon I the Good, King (c.934–960)
- Harald II Greycloak, King (c.961–970)
- Harald Bluetooth, King (c.970–985/986)
- Haakon Sigurdsson, de facto ruler (c.975–995)
- Olaf Tryggvason, King (995–1000)
- Sweyn Forkbeard, King (c.985–995, 1000–1014)

Sweden

- Sweden: Proto-historic (complete list) –

- Ring of Sweden, King (c.910–940)
- Erik Ringsson, King (c.940–950)
- Emund Eriksson, King (mid–10th century)
- Björn Eriksson, King (late 10th century)
- Olof Björnsson, King (late 10th century)

- Sweden (800–1521) (complete list) –

- Eric the Victorious, King (c.970–c.995)
- Olof Skötkonung, King (c.995–1022)

=== Europe: Southcentral ===
States of Italy in 1000 AD.

Holy Roman Empire in Italy

See also List of state leaders in the 10th-century Holy Roman Empire#Italy

- Kingdom of Italy (complete list) –

Integrum: Simultaneous claimants
- Berengar I, King (887–924)
- Louis III the Blind, King (900–905)
- Rudolph II of Burgundy, King (922–926)
- Hugh of Arles, King (924–947)
- Lothair II, King (948–950)
- Berengar II of Ivrea, co-King (950–961)
- Adalbert of Ivrea, co-King (950–963)
Ottonian dynasty
- Otto I, King (961–973)
- Otto II, King (980–983)
- Otto III, King (996–1002)

- March of Montferrat (complete list) –

- William I, Marquis (?–pre-934)
- Aleramo, Marquis (933–991)
- William II, co-Marquis (?–pre-967)
- Otto I, ruler (c.991)
- William III, ruler (991–pre-1042)

- Papal States (complete list) –

- Benedict IV, Pope (900–903)
- Leo V, Pope (903)
- Sergius III, Pope (904–911)
- Anastasius III, Pope (911–913)
- Lando, Pope (913–914)
- John X, Pope (914–928)
- Leo VI, Pope (928)
- Stephen VII, Pope (929–931)
- John XI, Pope (931–935)
- Leo VII, Pope (936–939)
- Stephen VIII, Pope (939–942)
- Marinus II, Pope (942–946)
- Agapetus II, Pope (946–955)
- John XII, Pope (955–963, 964)
- Benedict V, Pope (964)
- Leo VIII, Pope (964–965)
- John XIII, Pope (965–972)
- Benedict VI, Pope (973–974)
- Benedict VII, Pope (974–983)
- John XIV, Pope (983–984)
- John XV, Pope (985–996)
- Gregory V, Pope (996–999)
- Sylvester II, Pope (999–1003)

- Duchy of Spoleto (complete list) –

- Alberic I, Duke (898–922)
- Boniface I, Duke (923–928)
- Peter, Duke (924–928)
- Theobald I, Duke (928–936)
- Anscar, Duke (936–940)
- Sarlione, Duke (940–943)
- Hubert, Duke (943–946)
- Boniface II, Duke (946–953)
- Theobald II, Duke (953–959)
- Transamund III, Duke (c.959–c.967)
- Pandulf I, Duke (967–981)
- Landulf, Duke (981–982)
- Transamund III, Duke (982–989)
- Hugh I the Great, Duke (989–996)
- Conrad, Duke (996–998)
- Adhemar, Duke (998–999)

- March of Tuscany (complete list) –

- Adalbert II the Rich, Margrave (886–915)
- Guy, Margrave (915–929)
- Lambert, Margrave (929–931)
- Boso, Margrave (931–936)
- Humbert, Margrave (936–961)
- Hugh the Great, Margrave (961–1001)

- Republic of Venice (complete list) –

- Pietro Tribuno, Doge (888–912)
- Orso II Participazio, Doge (912–932)
- Pietro II Candiano, Doge (932–939)
- Pietro Participazio, Doge (939–942)
- Pietro III Candiano, Doge (942–959)
- Pietro IV Candiano, Doge (959–976)
- Pietro I Orseolo, Doge (976–978)
- Vitale Candiano, Doge (978–979)
- Tribuno Memmo, Doge (979–991)
- Pietro II Orseolo, Doge (991–1009)

==== Southern Italy ====
- Principality of Benevento (complete list) –

- Atenulf I, Prince (900–910)
- Landulf I, co-ruler (901–910), Prince (910–943)
- Atenulf II, co-ruler (911–940)
- Landulf of Conza, co-ruler (940)
- Atenulf III Carinola, co-ruler (933–943)
- Landulf II, co-ruler (940–943), Prince (943–961)
- Landulf III, co-ruler (959–961), Prince (961–968)
- Pandulf I, co-ruler (943–961), Prince (961–981)
- Landulf IV, co-ruler (968–981)
- Pandulf II, Prince (981–1014)

- Principality of Capua (complete list) –

- Atenulf I, Gastald (887–910)
- Landulf III, Gastald (901–910), Prince (910–943)
- Atenulf II, co-Prince (911–940)
- Landulf of Conza, co-Prince (940)
- Atenulf III Carinola, co-Prince (933–943)
- Landulf IV, Prince (940–961)
- Landulf III, Prince (959–968)
- Pandulf I Ironhead, Prince (961–981)
- Landulf VI, Prince (981–982)
- Landenulf II, Prince (982–993)
- Laidulf, Prince (993–999)
- Adhemar, Prince (999)
- Landulf VII, Prince (999–1007)

- Duchy of Gaeta (complete list) –

- Docibilis I, Hypatus (866–906)
- John I, Hypatus (867–933)
- Docibilis II, co-Hypatus (906–933), Duke (933–954)
- John II, co-Duke (933–954), Duke (954–963)
- Gregory, Duke (963–978)
- Marinus II, Duke (978–984)
- John III, co-Duke (979–984), Duke (984–1008)
- John IV, co-Duke (991–1008), Duke (1008–1012)

- March of Ivrea (complete list) –

- Anscar I of Ivrea, Margrave (888–902)
- Adalbert I, Margrave (902–929)
- Anscar II, Margrave (929–936)
- Berengar I, Margrave (936–957)
- Guy, Margrave (957–965)
- Adalbert II, Margrave (965–970)
- Conrad, Margrave (970–c.990)
- Arduin, Margrave (c.990–1015)

- Duchy of Naples (complete list) –

- Gregory IV, Duke (898–915)
- John II, Duke (915–919)
- Marinus I, Duke (919–928)
- John III, Duke (928–968/969)
- Marinus II, Duke (968/969–992/997)
- Sergius III, Duke (992–997/999)
- John IV, Duke (997/999–1005)

- Principality of Salerno (complete list) –

- Guaimar I, Prince (880–901)
- Guaimar II, Prince (901–946)
- Gisulf I, Prince (946–978)
- Landulf of Conza, Prince in opposition (973)
- Pandulf I Ironhead, Prince (978–981)
- Pandulf II, Prince (981)
- Manso, Prince (981–983)
- John I, Prince (981–983)
- John II, Prince (983–994)
- Guaimar III, Prince (994–1027)

- Emirate of Sicily (complete list) –

- al-Hasan al-Kalbi, Emir (948–953)
- Ahmad ibn al-Hasan al-Kalbi, Emir (954–969)
- Ya'ish, Emir (969-970)
- Abu'l-Qasim Ali ibn al-Hasan al-Kalbi, Emir (970–982)
- Jabir al-Kalbi, Emir (982–983)
- Ja'far al-Kalbi, Emir (983–985)
- Abdallah al-Kalbi, Emir (985–990)
- Yusuf al-Kalbi, Emir (990–998)
- Ja'far al-Kalbi, Emir (998–1019)

=== Europe: Southwest ===
==== Iberian Peninsula: Christian ====
Iberian Peninsula: Christian

- County of Aragon (complete list) –

- Galindo Aznárez II, Count (893–922)

- Kingdom of Asturias (complete list) –

- Alfonso III, King (866–910)
- Fruela II, King (910–925)

- County of Barcelona (complete list) –

- Wilfred II Borrel, Count (897–911)
- Sunyer, Count (911–947)
- Borrell II, Count (947–992)
- Miro, Count (947–966)
- Ramon Borrell, Count (988–1018)

- County of Pallars (complete list) –

- Raymond I, Count (872–920)
- Lope I, Count (920–947)
- Isarn, Count (920–948)
- Raymond II, Count (948–992)
- Borrell I, Count (948–995)
- Ermengol I, Count (992–1010)
- Suñer I, Count (995–1011)

- Kingdom of Pamplona (complete list) –

- Fortún Garcés, King (882–905)
- Sancho I, King (905–925)
- Jimeno Garcés, King (925–931)
- García Sánchez I, King (931–970)
- Sancho II, King (970–994)
- García Sánchez II, King (994–1000/1004)

- County of Ribagorza (complete list) –

- Raymond I, Count (872–920)
- Bernard I, Count (920–950/955)
- Miro, Count (920–?)
- Raymond II, Count (950/955–970)
- Humfred (II), Count (970–979)
- Arnold, Count (979–990)
- Isarn, Count (990–1003)

==== Iberian Peninsula: Muslim ====
Iberian Peninsula: Muslim

- Emirate of Córdoba (complete list) –

- Abdallah ibn Muhammad, Emir (888–912)
- Abd ar-Rahman III, Emir (912–929), Caliph (929–961)
- Al-Hakam II, Caliph (961–976)
- Hisham II, Caliph (976–1008, 1010–1012)

==== Marca Hispanica ====
Marca Hispanica

- County of Osona (complete list) –

- Ermengol, Count (939–943)

- County of Cerdanya (complete list) –

- Miró II, Count (897–927)
- Sunifred II, Count (927–968)
- Miró III, Count (968–984)
- Oliba Cabreta, Count (968–988)
- Wilfred II, Count (988–1035)

- County of Urgell (complete list) –

- Sunifred II, Count (898–948)
- Miró de Barcelona, Count (948–966)
- Borrell II, Count (966–992)
- Ermengol I of Córdoba, Count (992–1010)

=== Europe: West ===
- West Frankish Kingdom, later France (complete list) –

- Charles the Simple, King (898–922)
- Robert I, King (922–923)
- Rudolph, King (923–936)
- Louis IV, King (936–954)
- Lothair, King (954–986)
- Louis V, King (986–987)
- Hugh Capet, King (987–996)
- Robert II, King (987–1031)

- County of Angoulême (complete list) –

- Alduin I, Count (886–916)
- Aymer of Poitiers, Count (916–926)
- William II ("Taillefer" I), Count (926–c.945)
- Aymer II, Count (after 945–before 952)
- Bernard, Count (after 945–before 952)
- Arnald I "Voratio", Count (after 950–before 952)
- William III "Talleyrand", Count (952/964–before 973/975)
- Rannulf "Bompar", Count (973/975–975)
- Richard the Simple, Count (975?)
- Arnald II "Manzer", Count (975–988)
- William IV (Taillefer II), Count (988–1028)

- Anjou (complete list) –

- Fulk I, Count (898–942)
- Fulk II, Count (942–958)
- Geoffrey I, Count (960–987)
- Fulk III, Count (987–1040)

- Duchy of Aquitaine (complete list) –

- William I, Duke (893–918)
- William II, Duke (918–926)
- Acfred, Duke (926–927)
- Ebalus, Duke (890–893, 927–932)
- Raymond I, Duke (932–936)
- Raymond II, Duke (936–955)
- Hugh the Great, Duke (955–962)
- William III, Duke (962–963)
- William IV, Duke (963–995)
- William V, Duke (995–1030)

- County of Artois (complete list) –

- Adelelm, Count (?–932)

- Auvergne (complete list) –

- William I, Duke of Aquitaine, Count (886–918)
- William II, Duke of Aquitaine, Count (858–862, 918–926)
- Acfred, Duke of Aquitaine, Count (926–927)
- Ebalus Manzer, Count (927–934)
- Raymond Pons, Count of Toulouse, Count (940–941)
- William III, Duke of Aquitaine, Count (950–963)
- Armand of Clermont, Count (late 10th century)
- Robert I of Clermont, Count (late 10th century)
- Robert II of Clermont, Count (late 10th century)
- Robert III of Clermont, Count (late 10th century)
- Guy I of Auvergne, Count (979–989)
- William IV of Auvergne, Count (989–1016)

- County of Boulogne (complete list) –

- Baldwin I, Count (896–918)
- Adelolf, Count (918–933)
- Arnulf I, Count (933–964)
- Arnulf II, Count (964–971)
- Arnulf III, Count (971–990)
- Baldwin II, Count (990–1025)

- Bourbonnais (complete list) –

- Aymar de Bourbon, Lord (915–953)
- Aymon Ier de Bourbon, Lord (953–959)
- Archambaud Ier de Bourbon, Lord (959–990)
- Archambaud II de Bourbon, Lord (990–1031/34)

- Duchy of Brittany (complete list) –

- Alan I, King (876–907)
- Gourmaëlon, ruler (907–c.914)
- Hroflr, Viking ruler (early 10th century)
- Rognvaldr, Viking ruler (early 10th century)
- Incon, Viking ruler (early 10th century)
- Alan II, Duke (938–952)
- Drogo, Duke (952–958)
- Hoël I, Duke (960–981)
- Guerech, Duke (981–988)
- Conan I, Duke (990–992))
- Geoffrey I, Duke (992–1008)

- Duchy of Burgundy (complete list) –

- Richard the Justiciar, Duke (880–921)
- Rudolph, Duke (921–923)
- Hugh the Black, Duke (923–952)
- Gilbert, Duke (952–956)
- Otto, Duke (956–965)
- Eudes Henry, Duke (965–1002)

- County of Flanders (complete list) –

- Baldwin II, Count (879–918)
- Arnulf I the Great, Count (918–964)
- Baldwin III, Count (958–962)
- Arnulf II, Count (964–988)
- Baldwin IV the Bearded, Count (988–1037)

- Duchy of Gascony (complete list) –

- García II, Duke (893–c.930)
- Sans IV, Duke (930–c.950)
- Sans V, Duke (c.950–c.961)
- Guilhem II, Duke (c.961–996)
- Bernat I, Duke (996–1009)

- County of Maine (complete list) –

- Hugh I, Count (900–950)
- Hugh II, Count (950–992)
- Hugh III, Count (992–1015)

- County of Nevers (complete list) –

- Otto-Henry, Count (?–987)
- Otto-William, Count (987–992)
- Landri, Count (992–1028)

- Duchy of Normandy (complete list) –

- Rollo, Count (911–927)
- William Longsword, Count (927–942)
- Richard I the Fearless, Count (942–996)
- Richard II the Good, Duke (996–1027)

- County of Poitou (complete list) –

- Robert I, Count (866–923)
- Aymar, Count (892–902)
- Ebalus, Count (890–893, 902–935)
- William I, Count (935–963)
- William II, Count (963–995)
- William III, Count (969–1030)

- Provence / Lower Burgundy (complete list) –

- Louis the Blind, King(887–928)
- Hugh, King(911–933)
- Rotbold I, Count (961–1008)

- County of Toulouse (complete list) –

- Odo, Count (886–918)
- Raymond II, Count (918–924)
- Raymond III Pons, Count (924–c.950)
- Raymond (IV), Count (c.950–c.961)
- Hugh, Count (c.961–c.972)
- Raymond (V), Count (c.972–c.978)
- William III Taillefer, Count (978–1037)

- County of Vermandois (complete list) –

- Herbert I, Count (896–907)
- Herbert II, Count (907–943)
- Albert I the Pious, Count (943–988)
- Herbert III, Count (987–997)
- Albert II, Count (997–1035)

=== Eurasia: Caucasus ===
- Kingdom of Abkhazia (complete list) –

- Constantine III, King (c.898–916)
- George II, King (c.916–960)
- Leon III, King (c.960–969)
- Demetrius III, King (c.969–976)
- Theodosius III, King (c.976–978)
- Bagrat III, King (978–1014)

- Bagratid Armenia (complete list) –

- Smbat I, King (890–912)
- Ashot II, King (914–928)
- Abas I, King (928–952)
- Ashot III, King (952–977)
- Smbat II, King (977–989)
- Gagik I, King (989–1020)

- Principality of Iberia (complete list) –

- Adarnase IV, King (888–923)
- David II, King (923–937)
- Sumbat I, King (937–958)
- Bagrat II, King (958–994)
- Gurgen of Georgia, King (994–1008)

- First Kingdom of Kakheti (complete list) –

- Kvirike I, Prince (893–918)
- Padla II, Prince (918–929)
- Kvirike II, Prince (929–976)
- David, Prince (976–1010)

- Kingdom of Hereti (complete list) –

- Adarnase II, King (897–943)
- Ishchanik, King (943–951)
- Iany I, King (951–959)

- Kingdom of the Iberians (complete list) –

- Adarnase IV, King (888–923)
- David II, King (923–937)
- Sumbat I, King (937–958)
- Bagrat I, King (958–994)
- Gurgen, King (994–1008)

- Klarjeti (complete list) –

- David I, King (900–943)
- Sumbat II, King (943–988)
- David II, King (988–992/993)
- Sumbat III, King (992/993–1011)

== Oceania ==
Easter Island

- Easter Island (complete list) –

- Uremata, King (?)
- Te Riri Tuu Kura, King (?)
- Korua Rongo, King (?)
- Tiki Te Hatu, King (?)
- Tiki Tena, King (?)
- Uru Kenu, King (c.1000)

Tonga

- Tuʻi Tonga Empire (complete list) –

- 'Aho'eitu, King (c. 950)
- Lolofakangalo, King (?)
- Fangaʻoneʻone, King (?)

== See also ==
- List of political entities in the 10th century
- List of state leaders in the 10th-century Holy Roman Empire
