= Peter I (bishop of Benevento) =

Peter I (Latin: Petrus) was the bishop of Benevento from 887 or 894 until at least 902. His pontificate was marked by rapid political shifts, with Benevento successively under Byzantine (891–895), Spoletan (895–897) and Lombard rule. Peter was imprisoned and exiled a first time in 895. He served as the regent and de facto ruler of the Principality of Benevento between 897 and 900. In 902, he was proclaimed prince by the people but refused the office and went into exile a second time. He died in 914, possibly still in exile. He was buried in Benevento

== Election and Byzantine rule ==
Different dates are given for the start of his pontificate. According to the Annales Beneventani, Peter was elected bishop in 887. Peter received a letter from Pope Formosus dated 30 January 893. Without raising the diocese of Benevento to metropolitan rank, the pope confirmed the diocese of Siponto as subordinate to it. This letter, seen by Ferdinando Ughelli, is now lost. According to some historians, however, a certain Conservatus was elected bishop in 886 and ruled until his death in 894, with Peter being elected in that year or in 895.

Peter's pontificate was marked by tumult in the Principality of Benevento. In 891, following a three-month siege of Benevento, it was annexed by the Byzantine emperor Leo VI. The privileges of the church were confirmed by an imperial diploma. The Byzantine strategos George led the Beneventans in an attack on Salerno in 894, expecting some Salernitan exiles to open the gates for them. Peter, who had accompanied him not knowing the plan, advised him that if his men entered Salerno they would all die, and the spooked Byzantines duly retreated. It is in narrating this episode that the Chronicon Salernitanum calls Peter a "most wise prelate" (sagacissimus ... praesul).

== Spoletan rule and first exile ==
Peter, in the narrative of the Catalogus regum Langobardorum et ducum Beneventanorum, stood against the oppressiveness of Byzantine rule after George. In August 895, he urged the people to open the gates to Duke Guy IV of Spoleto, whose mother, the Empress Ageltrude, was a Beneventan. According to the short Continuatio codicis Vaticani, covering the years 890–897, when the Byzantines abandoned the city as the Spoletans approached, they refrained from harming it because it was under the care of Bishop Peter. It was because of Peter's popularity that Guy soon came to distrust him. According to the Catalogus, at the instigation of "jealous men" (invidis viris) Guy had him imprisoned for four months before exiling him to Salerno, where he was placed in the charge of Prince Guaimar I. This proved deeply unpopular, and Guy soon had to bring back the bishop, to much commotion and rejoicing, in the words of the Catalogus.

Guy ruled Benevento for about two years. In 896 or 897, he was recalled north by his mother and brother, the Emperor Lambert. He entrusted Benevento to Guaimar I of Salerno, but Adelfer, the gastald of Avellino, attempted to assassinate the prince while he was on his way to the city. Guaimar was wounded in the attack and Guy returned to escort him back to safety in Salerno. The Continuatio codicis Vaticani records with suspicion the rumour that Peter was behind the attempt on Guaimar's life. As a result of Guaimar's injury, Guy entrusted the regency of Benevento to Peter. The Byzantines at this time had adopted an offensive posture, and the rivers Sabato and Calore had flooded.

== Regency, second exile and death ==
In early 897, Ageltrude intervened to have her younger brother, Radelchis II, placed on the Beneventan throne. He was not popular in Benevento, but Peter worked for his acceptance. He was crowned prince on 1 April 897 in his sister's presence. From 897 to 900, Peter served as regent for Radelchis. Radelchis was regarded as a fool by the people and, taking advantage of the situation, Count Atenulf of Capua deposed, imprisoned and finally exiled him in November or December 899. He left Peter in charge of Benevento and returned to Capua. The Beneventans, who the rule of Capua, proclaimed Peter their prince in 902. It does not seem that Peter was the instigator of this rebellion. A similar popular revolt had put Bishop Athanasius II of Naples on the ducal throne of his city in 878. Atenulf returned to Benevento immediately on word of the revolt, and Peter fled "with shame" (cum rubore), in the words of the Chronicon Salernitanum, to his nephews and cousins in Salerno. He was received with honour by Prince Guaimar II and lived in Salerno "for some time" (aliquandiu), according to the Chronicon.

Ughelli believed that Peter died in exile. The Annales Beneventani record his death in 914. Some historians have him succeeded in 908 by a certain Waldefrid, but the dates of his pontificate are in fact unknown. There is a document placing John V on the episcopal throne in 911, but this might be re-dated to 915 to account for Peter's death. On the other hand, Peter may have been replaced by another bishop before his death. His marble sarcophagus was discovered beneath the cathedral of Benevento in October 1950. His body had disintegrated, but a gold pectoral cross bearing the name Petrus was recovered. The cross, which has settings for gems but not gems, appears to have been a votive cross repurposed by the bishop.

== Bibliography ==
- Berto, Luigi Andrea (2014). "The Image of the Byzantines in Early Medieval South Italy: The Viewpoint of the Chroniclers of the Lombards (9th–10th centuries) and Normans (11th century)" (PDF). Mediterranean Studies. 22 (1): 1–37. doi:10.5325/mediterraneanstu.22.1.0001.
- Bertolini, Ottorino (1923). "Annales Beneventani Monasterii Sanctae Sophiae". Bollettino dell'Istituto Storico Italiano e Archivio Muratoriano. 42: 1–163.
- Cappelletti, Giuseppe (1845). Le Chiese d'Italia dalla loro origine sino ai nostri giorni. Vol. 3. Antonelli.
- Gams, Pius Bonifacius (1873). Series episcoporum Ecclesiae catholicae: quotquot innotuerunt a beato Petro apostolo. Georg Joseph Manz.
- Gay, Jules (1904). L'Italie méridionale et l'empire byzantin depuis l'avènement de Basile I^{er} jusqu'à la prise de Bari par les Normands (867–1071). Albert Fontemoing.
- Grierson, Philip; Blackburn, Mark (2007). Medieval European Coinage. Vol. 1: The Early Middle Ages (5th–10th Centuries). Cambridge University Press.
- Kehr, Paul Fridolin (1962). Regesta pontificum Romanorum. Italia pontificia. Vol. 9. Weidemann.
- Kreutz, Barbara (1991). Before the Normans: Southern Italy in the Ninth and Tenth Centuries. University of Pennsylvania Press.
- Matarazzo, Raffaele, ed. (2002). Anonimo Salernitano – Chronicon. Arte Tipografica.
- Rotili, Marcello (2007). "Forme della cristianizzazione a Benevento e nella Longobardia minore". In Emma Vitale (ed.). La cristianizzazione in Italia tra tardoantico ed alto medioevo. Atti del IX Congresso nazionale di archeologia cristiana, Agrigento, 20–25 novembre 2004. Vol. 1. Carlo Saladino Editore. pp. 991–1016.
- Spinelli, Giovanni (1996). "Il papato e la riorganizzazione ecclesiastica della Longobardia meridionale". In Giancarlo Andenna; Giorgio Picasso (eds.). Longobardia e longobardi nell'Italia meridionale: le istituzioni ecclesiastiche. Pubblicazioni dell'Università Cattolica del Sacro Cuore. pp. 19–42.
- Ughelli, Ferdinando; Coleti, Nicola (1721). Italia sacra, sive de episcopis Italiae, et insularum adjacentium. Vol. 8. Sebastiano Coleti.
- Zazo, Alfredo (1950). "Un vescovo beneventano del IX secolo: "Petrus Sagacissimus"". Samnium. 23: 179–186.
