= Patrician (post-Roman Europe) =

Post-Roman European social class

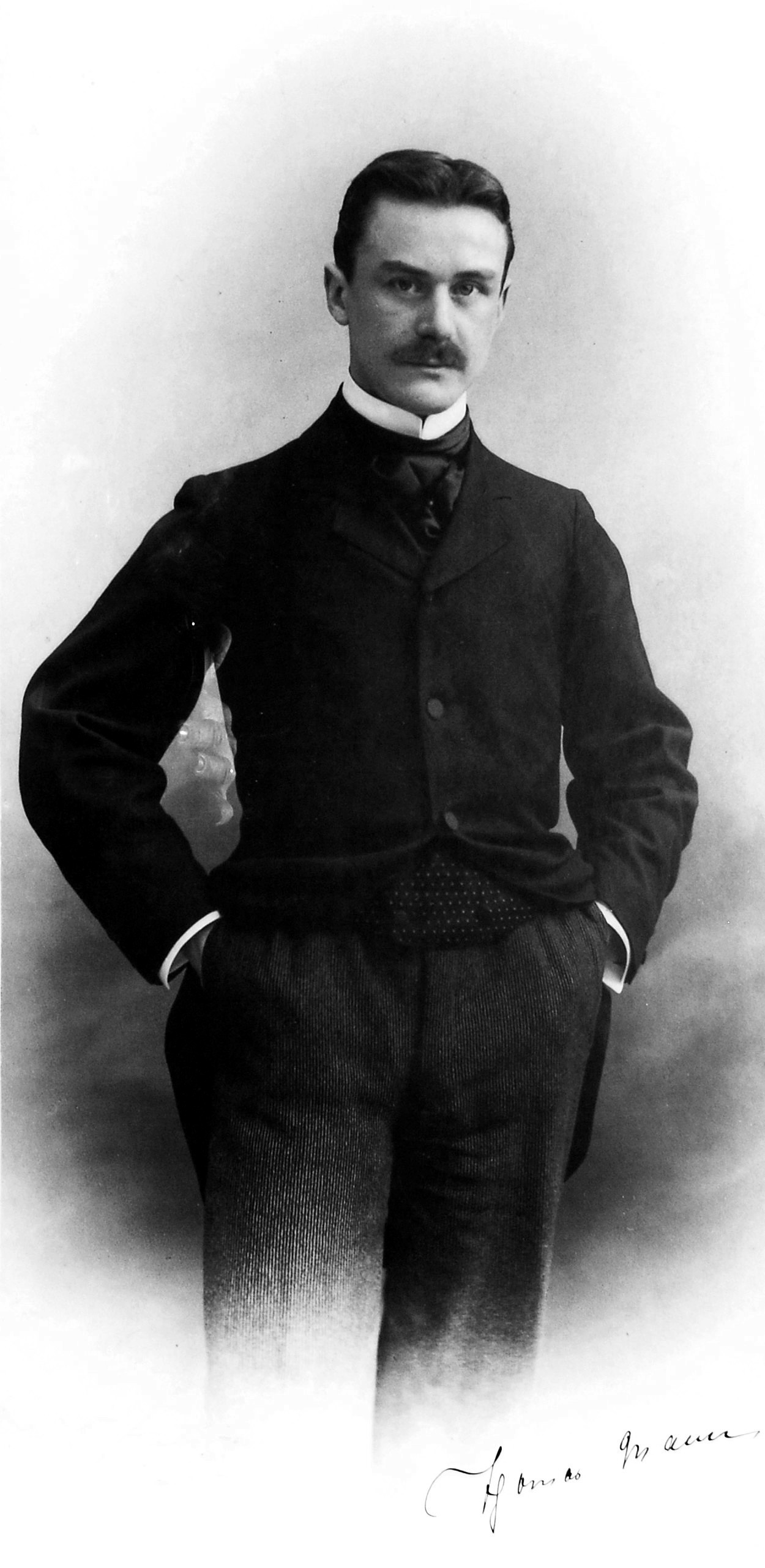
The Nobel Prize-winning author Thomas Mann belonged to a Hanseatic patrician family (the Mann family) and portrayed the patriciate in his 1901 novel Buddenbrooks.

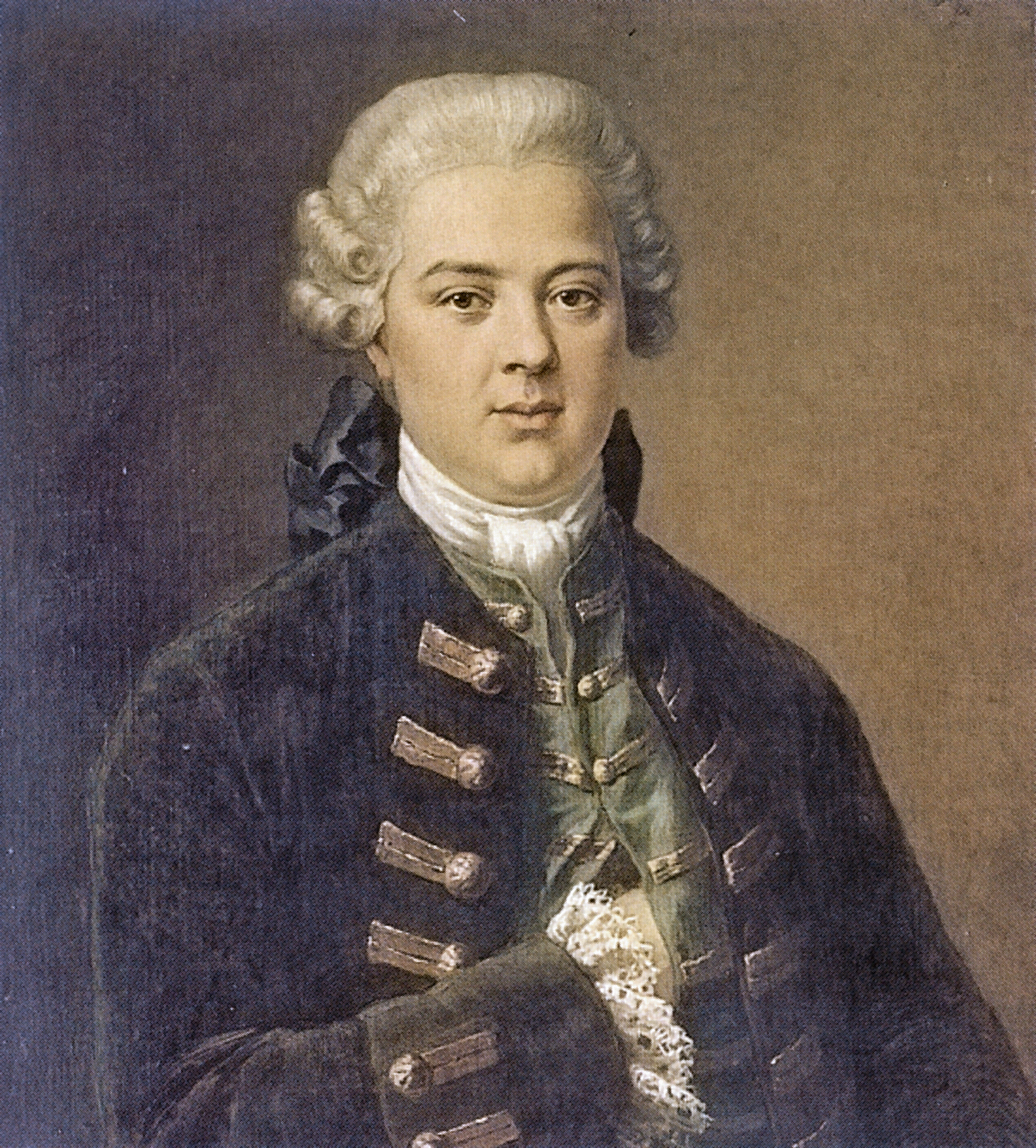
The German banker Johann Hinrich Gossler married Hamburg patrician heiress Elisabeth Berenberg, and became owner of Berenberg Bank. His descendants reached the highest positions in the "aristocratic republic", including as senators and head of state.

In post-Roman Europe, patricians constituted a hereditary class of elite families who monopolized political authority and economic dominance in autonomous urban centers, particularly in the Italian city-states and free imperial cities of the Holy Roman Empire, emerging as a distinct social order from the 11th century amid the decline of feudal structures and rise of commerce. Patricianship began in the ancient world, where cities such as Ancient Rome had a social class of patrician families, whose members were initially the only people allowed to exercise many political functions. In the rise of European towns in the 12th and 13th centuries, the patriciate, a limited group of families with a special constitutional position, in Henri Pirenne's view, was the motive force. In 19th century Central Europe, the term had become synonymous with the upper Bourgeoisie and cannot be interchanged with the medieval patriciate in Central Europe. In the maritime republics of the Italian Peninsula as well as in German-speaking parts of Europe, the patricians were as a matter of fact the ruling body of the medieval town. Particularly in Italy, they became part of the nobility and it became a noble title.

As in Ancient Rome, patrician status could generally only be inherited. However, membership in the patriciate could be passed on through the female line. For example, if the union was approved by her parents, the husband of a patrician daughter was granted membership in the patrician society Zum Sünfzen of the Imperial Free City of Lindau as a matter of right, on the same terms as the younger son of a patrician male (i.e., upon payment of a nominal fee), even if the husband was otherwise deemed socially ineligible. Accession to a patriciate through this mechanism was referred to as "erweibern."

In any case, only male patricians could hold, or participate in elections for, most political offices. Often, as in Venice, non-patricians had almost no political rights. Lists were maintained of who had the status, of which the most famous is the Libro d'Oro (Golden Book) of the Venetian Republic.

From the fall of the Hohenstaufen (1268), city-republics increasingly became principalities, like the Duchy of Milan and the Lordship of Verona. The smaller ones were swallowed up by monarchical states or sometimes other republics, like Pisa and Siena by Florence. Following these developments, any special role for the local patricians was restricted to municipal affairs.

The few remaining patrician constitutions, notably those of Venice and Genoa, were swept away by the conquering French armies of the period after the French Revolution, although many patrician families remained socially and politically important, as some do to this day.

In the modern era the term "patrician" is also used broadly for the higher bourgeoisie (not to be equated with aristocracy) in many countries; in some countries it vaguely refers to the non-noble upper class, especially before the 20th century.

== The patricius in Late Antiquity and the Early Middle Ages ==
There was an intermediate period under the Late Roman Empire and Byzantine Empire when the title was given to governors in the Western parts of the Empire, such as Sicily— Stilicho, Aetius and other 5th-century magistri militari usefully exemplify the role and scope of the patricius at this point. Later the role, like that of the Giudicati of Sardinia, acquired a judicial overtone, and was used by rulers who were often de facto independent of Imperial control, like Alberic II of Spoleto, "Patrician of Rome" from 932 to 954.

In the 9th and 10th centuries, the Byzantine emperors strategically used the title of patrikios to gain the support of the native princes of southern Italy in the contest with the Carolingian Empire for control of the region. The allegiance of the Principality of Salerno was bought in 887 by investing Prince Guaimar I, and again in 955 from Gisulf I. In 909 the Prince of Benevento, Landulf I, personally sought and received the title in Constantinople for both himself and his brother, Atenulf II. In forging the alliance that won the Battle of the Garigliano in 915, the Byzantine strategos Nicholas Picingli granted the title to John I and Docibilis II of Gaeta and Gregory IV and John II of Naples.

At this time there was usually only one "Patrician" for a particular city or territory at a time; in several cities in Sicily, like Catania and Messina, a one-man office of patrician was part of municipal government for much longer. Amalfi was ruled by a series of Patricians, the last of whom was elected Duke.

== Formation of the European patriciates ==
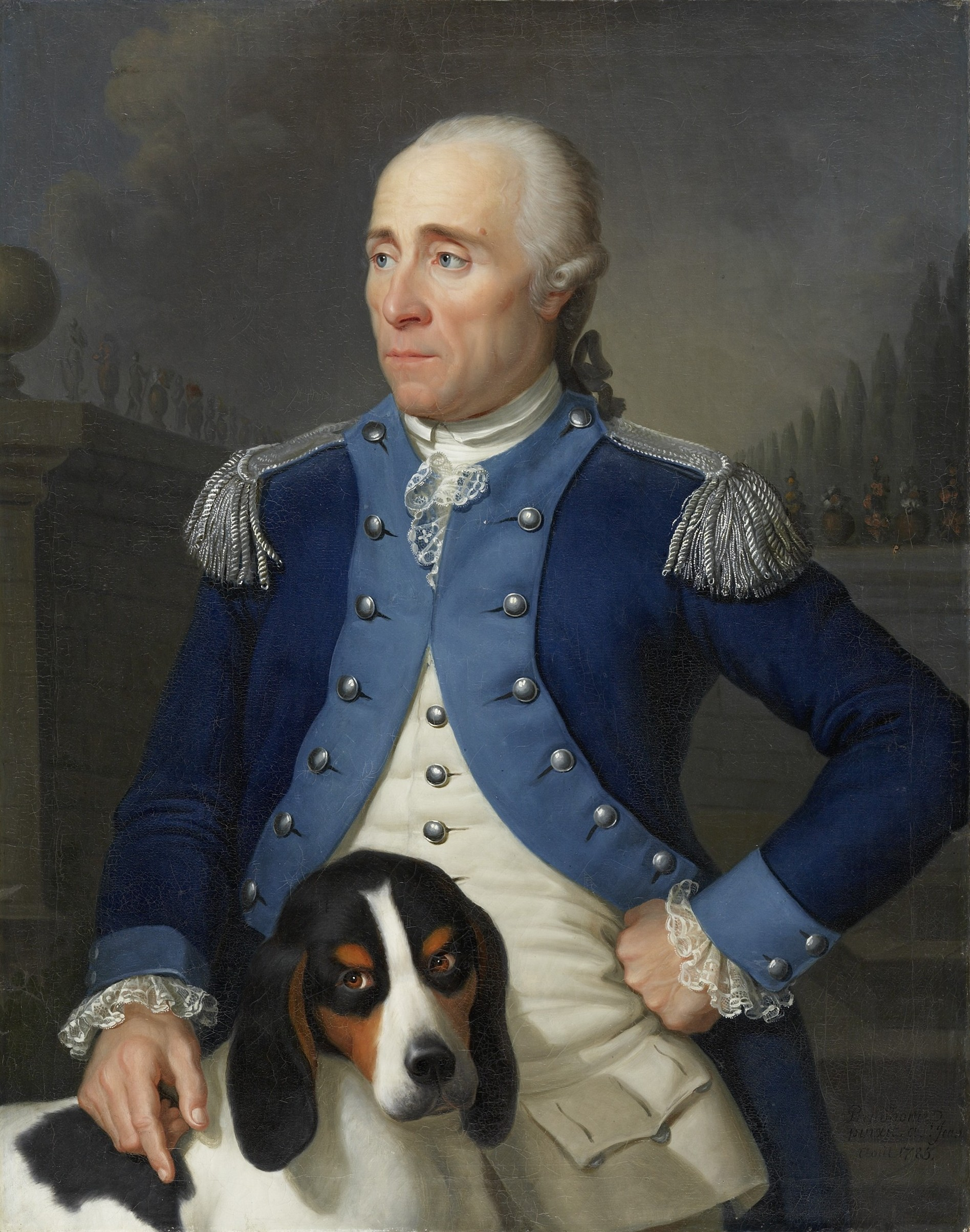
The Swiss patrician Franz Rudolf Frisching in the uniform of an officer of the Bernese Huntsmen Corps with his Berner Laufhund, painted by Jean Preudhomme in 1785

Though often mistakenly so described, patrician families of Italian cities were not in their origins members of the territorial nobility, but members of the minor landowners, the bailiffs and stewards of the lords and bishops, against whose residual powers they led the struggles in establishing the urban communes. At Genoa the earliest records of trading partnerships are in documents of the early 11th century; there the typical sleeping partner is a member of the local petty nobility with some capital to invest, and in the expansion of trade leading roles were taken by men who already held profitable positions in the feudal order, who received revenues from rents or customs tolls or market dues. Then in the 12th and 13th centuries, to this first patrician class were added the families who had risen through trade, the Doria, Cigala and Lercari. In Milan, the earliest consuls were chosen from among the valvasores, capitanei and cives. H. Sapori found the first patriaciates of Italian towns to usurp the public and financial functions of the overlord to have been drawn from such petty vassals, holders of heritable tenancies and rentiers who farmed out the agricultural labours of their holdings.

At a certain point it was necessary to obtain recognition of the independence of the city, and often its constitution, from either the Pope or the Holy Roman Emperor - "free" cities in the Empire continued to owe allegiance to the Emperor, but without any intermediate rulers.

In the late Middle Ages and early modern period patricians also acquired noble titles, sometimes simply by acquiring domains in the surrounding contado that carried a heritable fief. However, in practice the status and wealth of the patrician families of the great republics was higher than that of most nobles, as money economy spread and the profitability and prerogatives of land-holding eroded, and they were accepted as of similar status. The Republic of Genoa had a separate class, much smaller, of nobility, originating with rural magnates who joined their interests with the fledgling city-state. Some cities, such as Naples and Rome, which had never been republics in post-Classical times, also had patrician classes, though most holders also had noble titles. The Republic of Ragusa was ruled by a strict patriciate that was formally established in 1332, which was subsequently modified only once, following the 1667 Dubrovnik earthquake.

Subsequently, "patrician" became a vaguer term used for aristocrats and elite bourgeoisie in many countries.

== Transformations within patriciates ==
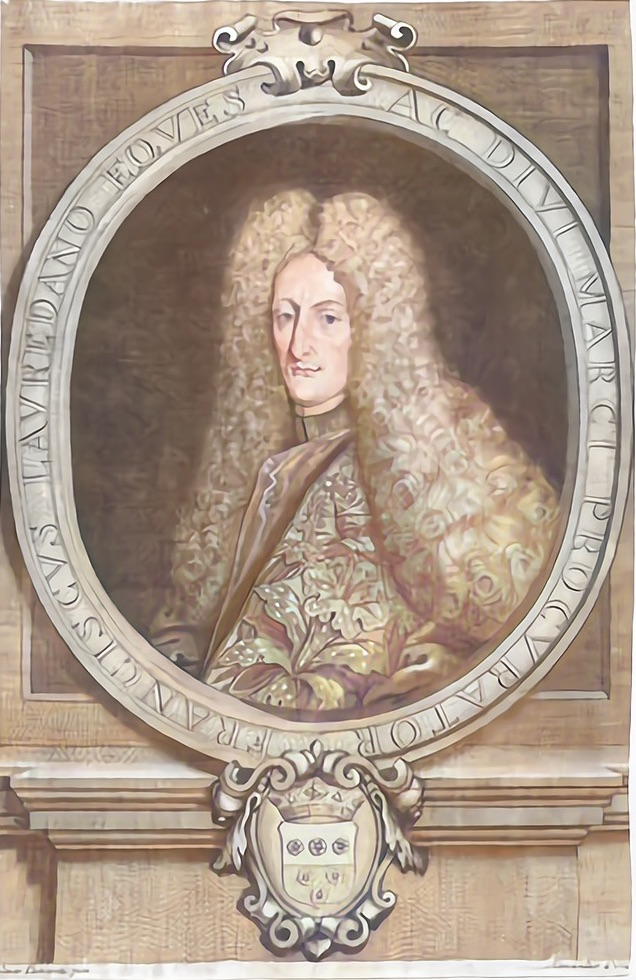
Francesco Loredan (1665–1715), Venetian nobleman and magnate, head of the Santo Stefano branch of the House of Loredan

In some Italian cities an early patriciate drawn from the minor nobles and feudal officials took a direct interest in trade, notably the textile trade and the long-distance trade in spices and luxuries as it expanded, and were transformed in the process. In others, the inflexibility of the patriciate would build up powerful forces excluded from its ranks, and in an urban coup the great mercantile interests would overthrow the grandi, without overthrowing the urban order, but simply filling its formal bodies with members drawn from the new ranks, or rewriting the constitution to allow more power to the "populo". Florence, in 1244, came rather late in the peak period of these transformations, which was between 1197, when Lucca followed this route, and 1257, when Genoa adopted similar changes. However Florence was to have other upheavals, reducing the power of the patrician class, in the movement leading to the Ordinances of Justice in 1293, and the Revolt of the Ciompi in 1378.

Of the major republics, only Venice managed to retain an exclusively patrician government, which survived until Napoleon. In Venice, where the exclusive patriciate reserved to itself all power of directing the Serenissima Repubblica and erected legal barriers to protect the state increased its scrutiny over the composition of its patriciate in the generation after the Battle of Chioggia. Venetians with a disputed claim to the patriciate were required to present to the avogadori di comun established to adjudicate such claims a genealogy called a prova di nobiltà, a "test of nobility". This was particularly required of Venetian colonial elite in outlying regions of the Venetian thalassocracy, as in Crete, a key Venetian colony 1211–1669, and a frontier between Venetian and Byzantine, then Ottoman, zones of power. For Venetians in Venice, the prova di nobiltà was simply a pro forma rite of passage to adulthood, attested by family and neighbours; for the colonial Venetian elite in Crete the political and economic privileges weighed with the social ones, and for the Republic, a local patriciate in Crete with loyalty ties to Venice expressed through connective lineages was of paramount importance.

== Recruitment to patriciates ==
Active recruitment of rich new blood was also a character of some more flexible patriciates, which drew in members of the mercantile elite, through ad hoc partnerships in ventures, which became more permanently cemented by marriage alliances. "In such cases an upper group, part feudal-aristocratic, part mercantile would arise, a group of mixed nature like the 'magnates' of Bologna, formed of nobles made bourgeois by business, and bourgeois ennobled by city decree, both fused together in law." Others, like Venice, tightly restricted membership, which was closed in 1297, though some families, the "case nuove" or "new houses" were allowed to join in the 14th century, after which membership was frozen.

== German cities of the Holy Roman Empire ==
Beginning in the 11th century, a privileged class which much later came to be called Patrizier formed in the German-speaking free imperial cities. Besides wealthy merchant Grand Burghers (German: Großbürger), they were recruited from the ranks of imperial knights, administrators and ministeriales; the latter two groups were accepted even when they were not freemen.

Members of a patrician society entered into oaths of loyalty to one another and directly with respect to the Holy Roman Emperor.

German medieval patricians, Patrician (post-Roman Europe) did not refer to themselves as such. Instead, they organized themselves into closed societies (i.e., Gesellschaften) and would point to their belonging to certain families or "houses" (i.e., Geschlechter), as documented for Imperial Free Cities of Cologne, Frankfurt am Main, Nuremberg. The Dance Statute of 1521 is an example of such closed identification. The use of the word Patrizier to refer to the most privileged segment of urban society dates back not to the Middle Ages but to the Renaissance. In 1516 the Nuremberg councillor and jurist Christoph Scheuerl (1481–1542) was commissioned by Johann Staupitz, the vicar general of the order of St. Augustine, to draft a précis of the Nuremberg constitution, presented on 15 December 1516 in the form of a letter. Because the letter was composed in Latin, Scheuerl referred to the Nuremberg "houses" as "patricii", making ready use of the obvious analogy to the constitution of ancient Rome. His contemporaries soon turned this into the loan words Patriziat and Patrizier for patricianship and patricians. However, this usage did not become common until the 17th and 18th centuries.

The Patrizier filled the seats of town councils and appropriated other important civic offices to themselves. For this purpose they assembled in patrician societies and asserted a hereditary claim to the coveted offices. In Frankfurt the Patrizier societies began to bar admittance of new families in the second half of the 16th century. The industrious Calvinist refugees from the southern Netherlands made substantial contributions to the city's commerce. But their advancement was largely limited to the material sphere. At the time this was summed up as

The Roman Catholics have the churches, the Lutherans have the power, and the Calvinists have the money.

Jews were in any case never even considered for membership in patricians' societies. Unlike non-Lutheran Christians and until their partial emancipation brought on by Napoleonic occupation, however, other avenues to advancement in society were also closed to them.

As in the Italian republics, this was opposed by the craftsmen who were organized in guilds of their own (Zünfte). In the 13th century they began to challenge the prerogatives of the patricians and their guilds. Most of the time the guilds succeeded in achieving representation on a town's council. However, these gains were reversed in most Imperial Free Cities through the reforms in 1551–1553 by Emperor Charles V (of the Holy Roman Empire, 1519–1556) and patricians consolidated their exclusive right to city counsel seats and associated offices, making the patriciate the only families eligible for election to the city council.

During the formative years of a patrician junker, it was common to pursue international apprenticeships and academic qualification. During their careers patricians often achieved high military and civil service positions in the service of their cities and the emperor. It was also common for patricians to gain wealth as shareholders of corporations which traded commodities across Europe.

In the territories of the former Holy Roman Empire, patricians were considered the equal of the feudal nobility (the "landed gentry"). Indeed, many patrician societies such as the Suenfzen of Lindau, referred to their members as "noble" and themselves as a "noble" or even "high noble" societies. Some patrician societies such as that of Bern, officially granted their members the right to use noble predicates whereas other patricians chose to use the noble predicate "von" in connection with their original name or a country estate, see e.g., the Lindau patrician families Heider von Gitzenweiler (also von Heider), Funk von Senftenau, Seutter von Loetzen (also von Seutter), Halder von Moellenberg (also von Halder), Curtabatt (also von Curtabat or de Curtabat). In 1696 and 1697 Emperor Leopold affirmed the noble quality (i.e., ebenburtigkeit") of Nuremberg Patrizier and their right to elevate new families to their society.

Notwithstanding that membership in a patrician society (or eligibility there for, i.e., "Ratsfähigkeit") was per se evidence of belonging to the highest of social classes of the Holy Roman Empire, patricians always had the option to have their noble status confirmed by a patent of nobility from the Holy Roman Emperor which was granted as a matter course upon the payment of fee. In any case, when travelling to other parts of Europe for example to the court of Louis XIV, members of the patrician societies of imperial free cities were recognized as noble courtiers as documented in the autobiography of Lindau Suenfzenjunker Rudolf Curtabatt.

The Holy Roman Empire ceased to exist in 1806. Although not the arbiter of who belongs to the historical German patriciate, the modern Genealogisches Handbuch des Adels (= Genealogical Handbook of Nobility) following appropriate review by the fourth chamber of the German Adelsrechtsausschuß or Noble Law Committee, will include families even without a title of nobility affirmed by the Emperor, when there is proof that their progenitors belonged to hereditary "council houses" in German imperial cities. To the extent patricians and their descendants chose to avail themselves of a noble predicate after 1806 and, therefore, without imperial affirmation, such titles and predicates would also be accepted by the German Adelsrechtsausschuß if acquired through a legal mechanism akin to adverse possession, i.e., Ersitzung.

In any case, in the Netherlands (see below) and many Hanseatic cities such as Hamburg, patricians scoffed at the notion of ennoblement. Indeed, Johann Christian Senckenberg, the famous naturalist, commented, "An honest man is worth more than all the nobility and all the Barons. If anyone were to make me a Baron, I would call him a [female canine organ] or equally well a Baron. This is how much I care for any title."

In 1816, Frankfurt's new constitution abolished the privilege of heritable office for the patricians. In Nuremberg, successive reforms first curtailed the patricians privileges (1794) and then effectively abolished them (1808), although they retained some vestiges of power until 1848.

== Patricianship in the Netherlands ==
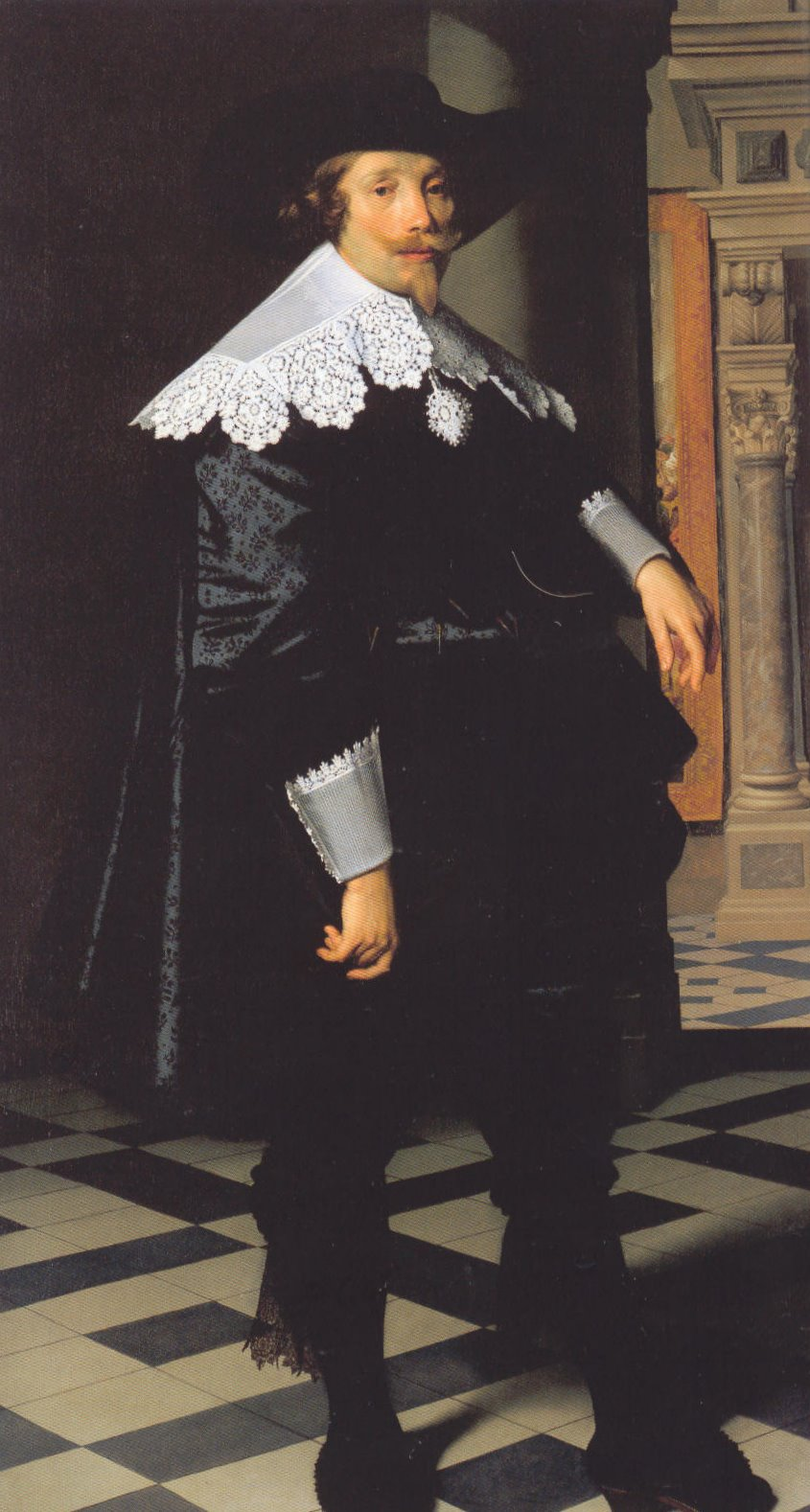
Cornelis de Graeff (1599–1664), regent and burgomaster of Amsterdam, painted by Pickenoy (1636)

The Netherlands also has a patriciate. These are registered in Nederland's Patriciaat, colloquially called The Blue Book (see List of Dutch patrician families). To be eligible for entry, families must have played an active and important role in Dutch society, fulfilling high positions in the government, in prestigious commissions and in other prominent public posts for over six generations or 150 years.

The longer a family has been listed in the Blue Book, the higher its esteem. The earliest entries are often families seen as co-equal to the lower nobility (Jonkheers, knights and barons), because they are the younger branches of the same family or have continuously married members of the Dutch nobility over a long period of time.

There are "regentenfamilies", whose forefathers were active in the administration of town councils, counties or the country itself during the Dutch Republic. Some of these families declined ennoblement because they did not keep a title in such high regard. At the end of the 19th century, they still proudly called themselves "patriciërs". Other families belong to the patriciate because they are held in the same regard and respect as the nobility but for certain reasons never were ennobled. Even within the same important families there can be branches with and without noble titles.

== Scandinavia ==
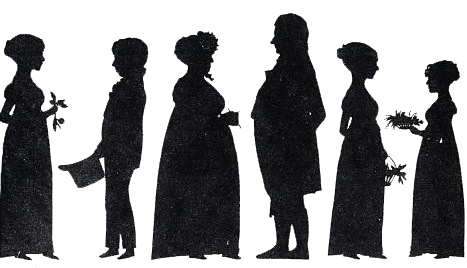
Members of the patriciate of Skien; the Altenburg/Paus families (late 1810s). To the right: Henrik Ibsen's mother Marichen Altenburg.

In Denmark and Norway, the term "patriciate" came to denote, mainly from the 19th century, the non-noble upper class, including the bourgeoisie, the clergy, the civil servants and generally members of elite professions such as lawyers. The Danish series Danske Patriciske Slægter (later Patriciske Slægter and Danske patricierslægter) was published in six volumes between 1891 and 1979 and extensively described Danish patrician families. The term was used similarly in Norway from the 19th century, based on the Danish model; notably Henrik Ibsen described his own family background as patrician. Jørgen Haave defines the patriciate in the Norwegian context as a broad collective term for the civil servants (embetsmenn) and the burghers in the cities who were often merchants or ship's captains, i.e. the non-noble upper class. The bourgeoisie frequently intermarried with the families of higher civil servants and the nobility; the boundaries between the groups were not sharp.

== Switzerland ==
While Switzerland was part of the Holy Roman Empire patricianship developed as per the other free imperial cities of the Holy Roman Empire, creating an aristocratic-like closed ruling class. It was composed by both noble and upper bourgeoisie families. After Switzerland officially seceded from the Holy Roman Empire in 1648, the wealthy urban cantons were politically dominant, and were in turn governed by the patricians of the Old Swiss Confederacy until the "Gracious Lords" were overthrown by the Helvetic Republic and finally by the liberal revolutions of the 1830s and 1840s. However, they were still able to maintain political and economic influence, especially in the cities. As in the German imperial cities, the patricians of these republics often became aristocrats at an early stage; thus, one speaks of "urban aristocracies" at the apex of the so-called "aristocratic republics."

== See also ==
- Aristocracy (class)
- Bourgeois of Brussels
- Bourgeois
- Daig (Switzerland)
- Gentry
- Grand Burgher (German Großbürger)
- Hanseaten (class)
- La Distinction
- Nobile
- Principalía
- Seven Noble Houses of Brussels
- Social environment
- Upper class

== General references ==
- Hans Körner: Frankfurter Patrizier. Historisch-Genealogisches Handbuch der Adeligen Ganerbschaft des Hauses Alten-Limpurg zu Frankfurt am Main. Ernst Vögel (publishers), Munich, 1971. [ISBN unspecified] (in German)
- J. Dronkers and H. Schijf (2004): "Huwelijken tussen adel en patriciaat: een middeel om hun eliteposities in een moderne samenleving in stand te houden?" (in Dutch)
- CBG. "Het Nederlands Patriciaat" (in Dutch)
- Alfred Otto Stolze: Der Sünfzen zu Lindau. Das Patriziat einer schwäbischen Reichsstadt. Bernhard Zeller, Lindau/Konstanz 1956.
- Christoph Heiermann: Die Spitze der Sozialstruktur: Organisation städtischer Eliten im Bodenseeraum. In Matthias Meinhardt und Andreas Ranft (Hrsg.): Die Sozialstruktur und Sozialtopographie vorindustrieller Städte. Akademie Verlag, Berlin 2005.
- Wolfgang Reinhard: Oligarchische Verflechtung und Konfession in oberdeutschen Städten. In Antoni Mączak (Hrsg.): Klientelsysteme im Europa der Frühen Neuzeit. Oldenbourg, München 1988
- Das Leben des Lindauer Bürgermeisters Rudolf Curtabatt. Hrsg. von Franz Joetze, Sch.V.G.B. 35 S. 355 FF.
- Ewige Quelle : Das Lebensbuch d. Anna Stolze von Pfister. 1–3. Tsd., Speer-Stolze, Clara, Heilbronn, Salzer, 1937.

Attribution

- The section German cities of the Holy Roman Empire above is based in part on Patrizier on the German Wikipedia
