= Alberic I of Spoleto =

Duke of Spoleto

Alberic I (died c. 925) was the Lombard Duke of Spoleto from between 896 and 900 until 920, 922, or thereabouts. He was also Margrave of Camerino, and the son-in-law of Theophylact I, Count of Tusculum, the most powerful man in Rome.

== Life ==
=== Early career ===
He first appears as a page to Guy III of Spoleto at the Battle on the Trebbia in 889. He may have later been the count of Fermo, but whatever the case, he succeeded to Spoleto after murdering Duke Guy IV.

He was recognised soon by King Berengar I, with whom he fought the Magyars in 899 or 900.

=== Roman alliances ===
Theophylact, Count of Tusculum, in the Alban Hills southeast of Rome served as palatine iudex (or leader of the militia) for Emperor Louis III. He remained in Rome, commanding a group of soldiers after the emperor's return to Provence in 902, and was prominent in the overthrow of Antipope Christopher in January 904. Together with Alberic, they secured the succession of Pope Sergius III. Under Sergius, Theophylact became both sacri palatii vestararius and magister militum. As the first oversaw appointments, and the second supervised the soldiers, Theophylact had effective control of the city. Theophylact was married to Theodora. They had two daughters: Marozia and Theodora. In 909, Marozia married Alberic. This alliance with the Tusculani was very advantageous, and he received the title of "patrician of the Romans," patricius Romanorum.

Although Alberic was a supporter of Pope Sergius, around 906, when the Pope agreed to crown Berengar Holy Roman Emperor, Alberic allied with his neighbour, Adalbert II, margrave of Tuscany. Together their combined forces blocked the road, preventing Berengar from reaching Rome.

=== Military career ===
Alberic was margrave of Camerino, and Duke of Spoleto. He was one of the leaders of the Christian League which defeated the Saracens at the Battle of the Garigliano in June 915. He led his troops from Spoleto and Camerino with those of Theophylact of Tusculum to join with Pope John X—and his contingent from Latium and Adalbert of Tuscany—and Nicholas Picingli, the strategos of Bari, leading the Byzantine forces and Lombard and Greek princes of the South: Guaimar II of Salerno, Landulf I of Benevento, Atenulf II of Capua, John I and the later Docibilis II of Gaeta, and Gregory IV and the later John II of Naples. Even Berengar sent a contingent from the March of Friuli. The battle went famously and many a petty prince received titles of great honour. Alberic was appointed the "consul of the Romans" in 917.

=== Downfall ===
He became, however, a tyrant in the Eternal City and people and pope expelled him. He was subsequently murdered in Orte between 924 or 926, probably because of his reliance on marauding Hungarians who supported his power. The dates of his downfall and death are as uncertain as those of his rise. He last appears in a datable document of 917, the Liber largitorius of Farfa Abbey.

== Family ==
He had four or five sons by Marozia:

- Pope John XI (b.910)
- Alberic II, who was later prince of Rome
- Constantino (d. after January 14, 945)
- Sergio, bishop of Nepi (d. before 963)
- David or Deodatus, who was the father of Pope Benedict VII

In addition, they had at least one daughter who was used to attempt a marriage alliance with the Byzantine emperor Romanos I Lekapenos by marrying her to one of his sons, either Stephen Lekapenos or Constantine Lekapenos.

Liutprand of Cremona says that Marozia's first son, who later became Pope John XI, was illegitimate, and the result of an affair with Pope Sergius. Subsequent commentators have repeated this report. Edward Gibbon says that the birth of John in 910, after her marriage to Alberic, would seem to indicate that Sergius was not the father. Horace Mann says that the report "...must be regarded as highly doubtful," and are assertions only made by bitter or ill-informed adversaries, and inconsistent with what is said by reliable contemporaries.

== Sources ==
- Partner, Peter (1972). The Lands of St Peter: The Papal State in the Middle Ages and the Early Renaissance. University of California Press.

Italian nobility
Preceded by Guy IV	Duke of Spoleto; 898–922; Note: dates are disputed	Succeeded by Boniface I
Unknown	Patricius Romanorum; 909–922	Succeeded by Alberic II
