= John III of Naples =

Italian duke (928–c.968)

John III (died late 968/early 969) was the longest-reigning Duke of Naples (928–968). He was the son and successor of Marinus I.

At the beginning of his reign, he warred against the Saracens and then made a treaty with them after they appeared beneath his walls in 929. He then allied with Lombards Atenulf III of Benevento, with whom he signed a pact, and Landulf I, joint-prince of Benevento, against the Byzantines. A Greek force was sent to Apulia and the rebellious vassals were constrained to recognise the authority of the emperor in Constantinople. John then confirmed a treaty with the princes salve fidelitate sanctorum imperatorum.

In 946, he allied with Landulf II of Benevento in an invasion of Salerno with the intent of deposing Prince Gisulf I. They were defeated by an army of Mastalus I of Amalfi and John retired to Naples. Landulf turned around and joined with Gisulf in attacking the Neapolitan duchy. They took Nola.

In 949, John made a donation to the church of Saints Severinus and Sossus, which had possibly been founded by one of his predecessors. In 950, he himself founded the church of Saint Michael Porta Nova in Naples. In 955, he attempted again to throw off the imperial yoke and again an army was sent to Italy under the strategos of Calabria and Langobardia, Marianos Argyros. Refused entry into Naples, it landed in the harbour and pillaged the city, forcing John to submit. In 962, however, John switched his allegiance to the new emperor in the West, Otto I. In 958, Naples was subject to another Muslim siege.

John's wife was the Roman senatrix Theodora III, granddaughter of the famous Theodora I and Theophylact I, Count of Tusculum. John was thus related by marriage to the famed Marozia. He sent his son Landulf to be raised in Rome by Marozia. His sister Orania married Docibilis II of Gaeta, cementing alliance between Gaeta and Naples. His elder son, Marinus, would succeed him in Naples. In 944, Marinus was appointed co-duke, and, in that same year, Odo of Cluny visited and influenced John to affirm the possessions of the monasteries in his domains.

John was a man of letters and an amateur philosopher. He and Theodora commissioned the archpriest Leo to go to Constantinople as ambassador and bring back as many Greek manuscripts as possible. Leo returned with the Chronographia of Theophanes, the Antiquities of the Jews by Flavius Josephus, De Prodigiis by Livy, the writings of Pseudo-Dionysius the Areopagite, and the Historia Alexandri Magni. After Theodora's death, John took to reading and theorising, contemplation and translation into Latin, according to Leo.

An interesting anecdote is told of this duke by Peter Damian. The legend probably dates from 981 and may have basis in historical fact. In a vision, John saw a group of devils leading a line of horses drawing carts full of hay for the purpose of burning Pandulf Ironhead, the deceased prince of Capua, and himself, still very alive. John decided then and there to abdicate, but only with the permission of the Emperor Otto II first. This he died before receiving.

== Sources ==
- Caravale, Mario (ed). Dizionario Biografico degli Italiani LV Ginammi – Giovanni da Crema. Rome: 2000.
- Chalandon, Ferdinand. Histoire de la domination normande en Italie et en Sicilie. Paris: 1907.
- Arnaldi, Girolamo (1960). "Dizionario Biografico degli Italiani - Volume 1 - ALBERICO di Roma". Treccani.

Preceded by Marinus I	Duke of Naples; 928–968	Succeeded by Marinus II
