= Guy IV =

Guy IV may refer to:

- Guy IV of Spoleto (d. 897)
- Guy IV, Count of Saint-Pol (1254–1317)
