= Mastalus I of Amalfi =

Mastalus I (Italian: Mastalo) (died 953) was the ruler (Archon, Iudex gloriosissimus, Patricius and Dominus, de facto Princeps terrae) of Amalfi from 900 to his death. He was the son of Manso I, who held the title of Prefect. In 900, he was elevated to co-rulership with his father. In 914, he became sole ruler, taking the imperial title Patricius. During his lengthy rule, he co-ruled at times with his two sons, Leo and John, and his grandson, Mastalus. Upon his death, he was succeeded by his grandson, Mastalus II, who was raised to the status of dux (duke).

According to the Chronicon Salernitanum, in 946, Mastalus came to the rescue of Gisulf I of Salerno, who was assaulted by an alliance of Landulf II of Benevento and John III of Naples. Mastalus ambushed Landulf's forces in the pass at La Cava.

Descendants

From this dynasty, only a single documented comital lineage probably descend, from Leo, bearing the surname Caccabellus (from the latin/Greek caccabus/kakkabos, meaning cauldron or tripod, which Amalfitani magnates, perpetuating an ancient tradition, considered a sacred symbol of wealth and power (see the Perris codex), similarly to the Grandees of Spain, previously called ricohombres or, namely, seniores de caldera y pendon, who for this reason included cauldron and kettles in their coats of arms, including canting ones). Its historical branch, from the late middle ages to the present day, is the noble Caccavale family of Nola, from 2026 updated Caccavale Lupo, for the Lupo-Lupis south Italy branch of the Marquis Lupi of Soragna family, trough the female line. This lineage begin with his grandson Sergio, as recorded in the parchments of the Codex diplomaticus cavensis: “ Mastalo filius quondam Sergio Atrianensis qui dicitur est Caccabellus…filius quondam Johannes de Leo comes” CDC n.248-966, n. 562-1004 Alim.

Preceded by Manso I	Patrician of Amalfi; 914–953	Succeeded by Mastalus II
