= Landulf of Conza =

Landulf of Conza (died after 979), a Lombard nobleman, was briefly Prince of Benevento in 940 and then briefly Prince of Salerno in 973. The son of Atenulf II of Benevento, Landulf ruled on his father's death (940) as co-prince with his uncle, Landulf I, who soon sent him into exile. He initially took refuge at the court of Marinus II of Naples, from where he sought shelter in Salerno through his sister, Gaitelgrima, the second wife of Prince Guaimar II of Salerno. This he received and he was soon appointed gastald of Conza, while his sons—Landenulf, Landulf, Indulf, and Guaimar—were invested with land in Salerno. The Chronicon Salernitanum, which is the most important source for Landulf's life, names the counties of Marsi, Sarno, and Lauro as those of Guaimar, Indulf, and Landenulf, respectively, but does not name a county for Landulf.

With the help of his allies, Marinus of Naples and Manso I of Amalfi, Landulf and his surviving sons (Landenulf died in 971), seized power in Salerno after expelling the reigning prince, Guaimar II's son by his first wife, Gisulf I, who fled to the court of Pandulf Ironhead, son of Landulf I and ruler of Benevento. With Pandulf's aid Gisulf was re-installed as prince later that year, with Pandulf's son Pandulf co-ruling with him. Despite the brevity of his reign, Landulf appears to have succeeded in minting coins in Salerno. One denarius weighing .66g survives bearing the legend +LAN / SALRN (in two lines, with LR ligatured). The other side bears an image of a saint and indiscernible Greek letters. If the attribution of the denarius to Landulf is correct, he would be the first Salernitan ruler to mint them since Guaimar I before 900. Unfortunately, the authenticity of the coins is also in doubt.
