= Landulf IV =

Landulf IV may refer to:

- Landulf IV of Capua (died 961)
- Landulf IV of Benevento (died 982)
