= Marinus I of Naples =

Marinus I (died 928) was the Duke of Naples from 919 to his death. He was the second son of Gregory IV and successor of his brother John II. The Chronicon ducum et principum Beneventi, Salerni, et Capuae et ducum Neapolis calls him Marianus. According to that document, he reigned eight years, nine months, and fifteen days.

Marinus was succeeded by his son John III. He left a daughter Orania who married Docibilis II of Gaeta and brought him Cimiterio and Liburia as a dowry.

== Sources ==
- Gay, Jules. L'Italie méridionale et l'empire Byzantin: Livre II. Burt Franklin: New York, 1904.

Preceded by John II	Duke of Naples; 919–928	Succeeded by John III
