= Landulf II of Benevento =

Landulf II (died 961), called the Red, was the Lombard prince of Benevento and prince of Capua (as Landulf IV) from 939 or 940, when his father, Landulf I, first associated him with the government. His mother was Gemma, daughter of Athanasius of Naples. He may have been associated as early as 933, when his elder brother, Atenulf III, was made co-regent. His uncle Atenulf II died in 940 and it is likely that Landulf served as a replacement. Landulf married Yvantia on an unknown date.

Whatever the case, when the elder Landulf died on 10 April 943, Landulf removed his elder brother Atenulf to Benevento and his uncle Atenulf's son Landulf to Capua. Fearing for their lives, the two fled to Guaimar II of Salerno and Landulf the Red became sole prince. His first act was to continue the family policy of associating younger sons as co-princes in the government. He made his eldest son Pandulf co-prince. Other than that, Landulf made few attempts to continue the family policy of alliance with his fellow Lombards and détente with the Byzantines. He distanced himself from Constantinople, while trying not to enter into open warfare, and made several tries at reuniting the Lombard principality of Salerno with the united Capua-Benevento. He abandoned imperial dating and dated from his own reign.

In 946, he allied with John III of Naples to oust Gisulf I of Salerno, son of Guaimar. He was ambushed in a pass at La Cava by Mastalo I of Amalfi and the ousting failed. He soon broke his alliance with Naples and allied with Gisulf to besiege Neapolitan Nola. In 950, he was called to the aid of Aligerno, abbot of Monte Cassino. His descendants would prove to be some of the worst persecutors of the monastery. He followed up his Salernitan and Neapolitan failures with successful campaigns against the gastald of Aquino, Atenulf Megalu, whom he exiled to the court of Docibilis II of Gaeta.

In 955, Landulf made his biggest failure in supporting an Apulian revolt against Greek authority, and subsequently was forced to recognize Byzantine supremacy. The rest of his reign was less eventful, as he failed in his two great ambitions: conquering Salerno and opposing the Byzantines. He associated his second son, Landulf, with him in 959 and died in 961.

== Sources ==
- Caravale, Mario (ed). Dizionario Biografico degli Italiani: LXIII Labroca – Laterza. Rome, 2004.

Preceded by Landulf I and Atenulf I	Prince of Benevento and Capua; 940–961; Co-ruler with Landulf I and Atenulf III in 940–943	Succeeded by Pandulf I and Landulf III
