= Aiulf II of Benevento =

Aiulf II (also Aio, Ajo, or Aione) reigned as Prince of Benevento (884 – 891) during a particularly stormy period for the independent principality.

He deposed his elder brother, Radelchis II, in 884 or 885 at a time when the Byzantines, under Nicephorus Phocas the Elder, had been reconquering Calabria since 883. Nicephorus concentrated his attacks on territory around Benevento and Aiulf responded by capturing Bari. Bari was recaptured within the year.

Aiulf also had to deal with an invasion by the Duchy of Naples.

Regnal titles
Preceded by Guaifer of Benevento	Prince of Benevento; 884 – 891	Succeeded by Ursus
