= Ursus of Benevento =

Prince of Benevento

Ursus
- Prince of Benevento
- Reign: 890/891 – 892
- Predecessor: Aiulf II
- Successor: Byzantine occupation
- Died: 892
- Father: Aiulf II

Ursus or Orso (died 892) succeeded his father, Aiulf II, as Prince of Benevento in 890 or 891. Ursus did not long hold this post. He was deposed after the capture of Benevento by the Byzantine strategos of Calabria, Sybbaticius. Benevento became, albeit briefly, the capital of the thema of Langobardia. His epitaphium says:

Ursus . . . splendida progenies . . . hunc genuit princeps Bardorum stemmate clarus Radelchis.

Regnal titles
Preceded by Aiulf II	Prince of Benevento; 891 – 892	Vacant Title next held by Guy
