= Sergius III of Naples =

Duke of Naples

Sergius III was a duke of Naples. He was preceded by his father, Marinus II and succeeded by his son, John IV.

Preceded by Marinus II	Duke of Naples; 992 – after 997	Succeeded by John IV
