= Radelchis II of Benevento =

Radelchis II (died 907) was the prince of Benevento from 881 to 900 with a long interruption during which the Byzantines and Spoletans vied for the principality. In 884 (or 885), he was deposed and exiled by his brother Aiulf. In 897 (or 898), he was restored only to be conquered by his cousin Atenulf I of Capua in January 900. He never ruled again.

His father was Adelchis of Benevento.

| Preceded by Guaifer | Prince of Benevento; 881–884 | Succeeded by Aiulf II |
| Preceded by Guy | Prince of Benevento; 897–900 | Succeeded by Atenulf I |
