= Gregory IV of Naples =

Gregory IV (died 915) was the firstborn son of Duke Sergius II of Naples and successor of his paternal uncle, Bishop Athanasius, in 898, when he was elected dux, or magister militum, unanimously by the aristocracy. His other paternal uncle, Stephen, succeeded Athanasius as bishop. According to the Chronicon ducum et principum Beneventi, Salerni, et Capuae et ducum Neapolis, he reigned for sixteen years and eight months.

The Mezzogiorno in his time was under constant Saracen assaults. Around 900, Gregory destroyed the castrum Lucullanum, a Neapolitan fortress just outside the city, to prevent the Muslims from taking it as a base. Otherwise, he reinforced the city walls and stored supplies to ensure survival in the event of a long siege. According to the much later chronicler Leo of Ostia, he signed a pact with the prince of Benevento and Capua, Atenulf, and the Amalfitans and attacked and defeated the Saracens. On 2 July 911, he signed another pactum with Atenulf's sons, the coprinces Atenulf II and Landulf I, whereby they shared the disputed territory of Liburia.

In that same year, he participated in allied attacks on the Saracen fortress on the Garigliano. In 915, he joined the massive army of south Italian princes and the Byzantine strategos Nicholas Picingli and received the imperial title of patricius. The army met with the forces of the central peninsula under Alberic I of Spoleto and Pope John X. Together they led another assault on the encampment of the Garigliano. In the ensuing battle, it was on the misplaced (or mendacious) advice of Gregory that they charged the Saracen line. Nevertheless, it was a success and the enemy fled into the forest to be hunted down and slaughtered. Gregory did not long live to enjoy the fruits of victory, he died within months, late in the year 915, and was succeeded by his firstborn son, John II, who had been present at the battle.

In 907 Gregory made a donation to the urban church of Saints Severinus and Sossus in Naples, which his forefathers had possibly founded.

== Sources ==
- Caravale, Mario (ed). Dizionario Biografico degli Italiani: LIX Graziando – Grossi Gondi. Rome, 2002.

Preceded by Athanasius	Duke of Naples; 898–915	Succeeded by John II
