= Athanasius of Naples =

Bishop and Duke of Naples

Athanasius (died 898) was the Bishop (as Athanasius II) and Duke of Naples from 878 to his death. He was the son of Gregory III and brother of Sergius II, whom he blinded and deposed in order to seize the throne while he was already bishop.

In this usurpation, Athanasius was originally supported (financially) by Pope John VIII, who desired to break the Neapolitan friendship with the Saracens.

In 879, John excommunicated Athanasius, for the latter had not yet broken with the Moslems. He was instead involving himself in the wars over the throne of Capua. He assisted Atenulf against his brothers and cousins. With Byzantine troops, he besieged Capua itself. From about 881, he himself ruled Capua, technically a vassal of Prince Guaimar I of Salerno. He and Guaimar fought an indecisive war while the latter was preoccupied with the Saracen menace Athanasius was ignoring. In 886, Athanasius, since released from excommunication, was allied with the Saracens again and received a threat from Pope Stephen V of a blockade of Naples.

By 887, Atenulf was installed in Capua as count. In 888, Athanasius and Atenulf disputed the region of "Liburnia" and went to war. They fought an indecisive battle at S. Carzio on the Clanio.

In 895, Athanasius fomented a revolt of the Neapolitan populace in the city of Salerno. However, Guaimar's young son, Guaimar II, put it down.

Domestically, Athanasius increased the power and prestige of Naples. He was a hellenophile who worked to preserve many Greek manuscripts and maintain good relations with Byzantium. He had a daughter, Gemma, who married Landulf I of Benevento, son of his former ally Atenulf. He was succeeded as duke by his nephew Gregory IV and as bishop by his brother Stephen.

== Sources ==
- Engreen, Fred E. "Pope John the Eighth and the Arabs." Speculum, Vol. 20, No. 3. (Jul., 1945), pp. 318–330.
- Erchempert. Historia Langabardorvm Beneventarnorvm. at The Latin Library.
- Caravale, Mario (ed). Dizionario Biografico degli Italiani: IV Arconati – Bacaredda. Rome, 1962.

Preceded by Sergius II	Duke of Naples; 878–898	Succeeded by Gregory IV
