= Marinus II of Naples =

Marinus II (died 992) was the Duke of Naples from 968 to his death. He was the son and successor of John III and brought Naples back into the Byzantine fold, receiving the title eminentissimus consul et dux, atque imperialis anthipatus patricius. In 970, Marinus did homage for his duchy to the Byzantine patrician Eugene after the imprisonment of Pandulf Ironhead. He then participated in the siege of Capua. He devastated the surrounding countryside and took an enormous booty before an army of Otto I, Holy Roman Emperor forced the Greeks to retreat. In 974, Marinus allied with Manso I of Amalfi and Landulf of Conza to depose Gisulf I of Salerno. They were defeated, however, by the intervention of Pandulf Ironhead. On 4 November 981, the Emperor Otto II was in Naples, probably with the permission of Marinus, who was moving away from his pro-Byzantine policy. He was succeeded by his son Sergius III.

In 975, Marinus made a donation to the urban church of Saints Severinus and Sossus in Naples.

== Sources ==
- Gay, Jules. L'Italie méridionale et l'empire Byzantin: Livre II. New York: Burt Franklin, 1904.

Preceded by John III	Duke of Naples; 968–992	Succeeded by Sergius III
