= Atenulf III of Benevento =

Atenulf III, called Atenulf of Carinola, was the co-prince of Capua and Benevento from 933, when his father, Landulf I, and uncle, Atenulf II, made him so. His younger brother Landulf the Red succeeded co-prince Atenulf in 939 or 940. When the elder Landulf died on 10 April 943, the younger Landulf removed his elder brother Atenulf to Benevento and his uncle Atenulf's son Landulf to Capua. Fearing for their lives, the two fled to Guaimar II of Salerno and Landulf the Red became sole prince.

Atenulf III married Rotilda, daughter of Guaimar II as his first wife. It was a diplomatic marriage.

== Sources ==
- Caravale, Mario (ed). Dizionario Biografico degli Italiani: IV Arconati – Bacaredda. Rome, 1962.
- Thierry Stasser, “Où sont les femmes? Prosopographie des femmes des familles princières et ducales in Italy meridionale…” in Prosopon: The Journal of Prosopography (2006).
