= Gisulf I of Salerno =

Gisulf I (also Gisulph, Gisolf, Gisulfo, Gisolfo, Gisulphus, or Gisulfus) (May 930 – November or December 977) was the eldest son of Guaimar II, Lombard Prince of Salerno, and his second wife Gaitelgrima. He was associated with his father as ruler in 943 and succeeded him on his death in 952. He took to using the title Langobardorum gentis princeps, "prince of the people of the Lombards". He was originally under the regency of his mother and Prisco (Priscus), treasurer (comes tesaurarium) and count of the palace (magister palatii).

In 946, he was attacked by Landulf II of Benevento in alliance with John III of Naples, but his own ally, Mastalo I of Amalfi, came to his rescue and ambushed Landulf's forces at La Cava. In the next year, he allied with Landulf and besieged Neapolitan Nola. In October 953, he issued a diploma favouring the bishop of Naples, but the unscrupulous diplomacy of his neighbours never seemed to favour him. Sometime after 955, however, he was made a patrician by Marianus Argyrus, the Byzantine strategos of Bari. In Autumn 966, Pope John XIII led a Roman-Tuscan-Spoletan army against Landulf III of Benevento and his brother Pandulf Ironhead, but Gisulf came to his rescue and no battle was given. The pope and Gisulf made a treaty at Terracina. It was this act which bought him later assistance from the powerful Ironhead.

In 973, Gisulf was deposed and removed from office by Landulf of Conza and his sons in alliance with Marinus II of Naples and Manso of Amalfi. His neighbour, the prince of Benevento and Capua, Pandulf Ironhead, restored Gisulf as his vassal. Though Gisulf was married to Gemma, he died heirless in late 977 (or perhaps 978) and Pandulf succeeded in Salerno.

Regnal titles
Preceded by Guaimar II	Prince of Salerno; 952–977	Succeeded by Pandulf I
