= Guaimar II of Salerno =

Guaimar II (also Waimar, Gaimar, or Guaimario, sometimes called Gybbosus, meaning "Hunchback") (died 4 June 946) was the Lombard prince of Salerno from 901, when his father Guaimar I retired (or was retired) to a monastery where he resided until his death. His mother was Itta. He was associated with his father in the principality from 893. He restored the princely palace, financed the building of a campanile for the palace church of San Pietro, and restored gold coinage.

His father was captured in 895 and he ruled the principality in his stead. When Duke Athanasius of Naples incited a revolt against Guaimar I, it was only through his assistance that the revolt was put down. After his despotic and unpopular father retired, or was forced to retire, to the monastery of San Massimo, he took over the reins of government completely.

At first, he continued the Byzantine alliance of his father and received the titles of patricius and protospatharius. He also allied himself to Capua, then united to the Principality of Benevento, by marrying Atenulf I's daughter Gaitelgrima in his second marriage. The daughter of his first marriage, Rotilda, married Atenulf III, the nephew of Atenulf II and son of Landulf I. He may have had a son named Guaimar from his first marriage.

Guaimar II was present at the Battle of the Garigliano in 915, where the forces of Gaeta, Naples, Capua, Benevento, Salerno, Lazio, Spoleto, Rome, and even Byzantine Italy led by Pope John X destroyed the Fatimid fortress on the Garigliano. The Chronicum Salernitanum attributes many other victories over the Saracens to him.

After the Garigliano, Guaimar joined Landulf I of Capua against Byzantium, renouncing his allegiance in 923 or 926. By agreement with Landulf, they jointly attacked Apulia and the Campania. Apulian conquests were to be Landulf's, while Campanian ones Guaimar's. Landulf was largely unsuccessful, but Guaimar was very much so. Landulf called in the assistance of Theobald of Spoleto, but the unscrupulousness of the latter broke down the alliance and, in the early 930s, Guaimar returned to the Byzantine fold, with much persuasion from the protospatharius Epiphanius. In 940, at the urging of his wife, he accepted the exiled Landulf of Benevento and his sons, bestowing on them territories in Salerno.

Guaimar was religious and endowed San Massimio, which was founded by his grandfather, Guaifer. He also supported the Cluniac reformers in his final years. He associated his son by his second wife, Gisulf, with him in 943 and Gisulf succeeded when Guaimar died on 4 June 946.

Regnal titles
Preceded by Guaimar I	Prince of Salerno; 901–946	Succeeded by Gisulf I
