= Landulf I of Benevento =

Landulf I (died 10 April 943), sometimes called Antipater, was a Lombard nobleman and the Prince of Benevento and of Capua (as Landulf III) from 12 January 901, when his father, Atenulf I, prince of Capua and conqueror of Benevento, associated his with him in power.

In 909, he went to Constantinople to receive the titles of anthypatos and patrikios. His brother Atenulf II stayed behind in Italy and received like investiture. In June 910, his father died and he became sole prince. Immediately, he invested his brother as co-prince.

On 2 July 911, Landulf signed a treaty with Duke Gregory IV of Naples, part of a policy of alliance and friendship with his fellow Christian rulers of the Mezzogiorno. He also continued a policy of alliance with Byzantium, but never servility. He never pledged to be a vassal of the emperor in Constantinople. In 914, he succeeded in having the great abbey of Monte Cassino transferred from Teano to Capua and he and Atenulf appointed one John abbot. The next year (915), they sent John as ambassador to Constantinople to renew the bonds of allegiance.

The summer of 915, the forces of the new Byzantine strategos of Bari, Nicholas Picingli, joined those of various other south Italian princes: John I and Docibilis II of Gaeta, Gregory IV and John II of Naples, and Guaimar II of Salerno. Through diplomatic marriages, Landulf had succeeded in allying these rulers to himself: he had married Gemma, daughter of Athanasius of Naples, and Atenulf's daughter Gaitelgrima married Guaimar II. His own son, Atenulf III, married Rotilda, Guaimar's daughter. Together the Greco-Lombard army joined the northern forces of Pope John X and Alberic I of Spoleto and vanquished the Saracens at the Battle of Garigliano. According to Liudprand of Cremona, Landulf, a "potent prince", in answering a request for advice from the pope, initiated the alliance that brought an end to the Saracens on the Garigliano. He downplays the coordinating role of John X in favour of that of Landulf, who is portrayed as militarily savvy.

In 921, he supported an anti-Greek Apulian rebellion, ravaging as far as Ascoli. He was forced, however, to send his second son, Landulf II, to Constantinople as a hostage. In 923 or 926, by agreement with Guaimar, they would jointly attack Byzantine possessions, Landulf taking Apulia and Guaimar, Campania. Landulf was largely unsuccessful, though Guaimar was much so. In 929, with Atenulf II, Guaimar II, and Theobald of Spoleto, he invaded Apulia and Calabria again. This time, all were unsuccessful and Theobald hurt the old alliance.

In 933, Landulf associated his son Atenulf with himself and his brother in the government. In 934, Guaimar was persuaded to quit the alliance by the Byzantine agent Cosmas of Thessalonica. In 935, King Hugh of Italy gave his support to the Greeks. Within a few years, Landulf's successful anti-Byzantine policy had been reversed and he was forced to make peace, but clashes continued: at Siponto in 936 and at Matera in 940. In 937, a band of Hungarians marched from Burgundy to Italy via the Rhone valley in the service of King Hugh, who sent them against Monte Cassino, Naples and Capua, plundering and destroying all before them. In 939, Landulf's brother Atenulf died and Atenulf's eldest son, Landulf, succeeded him, but was soon exiled to Naples by his uncle. He died four years later on April 10, 943.

== Sources ==
- Caravale, Mario (ed). Dizionario Biografico degli Italiani, LXIII: Labroca – Laterza. Rome, 2004.
- Liudprand of Cremona. The Complete Works of Liudprand of Cremona, Paolo Squatriti, ed. and trans. Washington, D.C.: Catholic University of America Press, 2007.

== Notes ==
Preceded by Atenulf I	Prince of Capua; 910–943	Succeeded by Landulf II
Preceded by Atenulf I	Prince of Benevento; 910–943	Succeeded by Landulf II
