= Guy IV of Spoleto =

9th Century Italian nobleman

Guy IV (Guido or Wido; assassinated 897) was the Duke of Spoleto and Camerino from 889 and Prince of Benevento from 895. He was the son of Guy II of Spoleto.

In either 888, when his father was crowned King of France, or 889, when his father was crowned King of Italy, Guy was granted the Duchies of Spoleto and Camerino. Though his father never secured the French kingdom, he did maintain his Italian crown and thus happily divested himself of his responsibilities in Spoleto itself, the hereditary possession of his family. Guy was a capable warrior and leader. He conquered Benevento from the eastern Romans and made himself prince there (895). He offered the regency of his conquered principality to Guaimar I of Salerno, the husband of his sister Itta, but Guaimar was captured en route to Benevento by Adelfer, the gastald of Avellino. Guy had to go down and besiege Avellino to get his release.

After reigning in Benevento for a year and eight months, Guy travelled to Rome to meet the Emperor Lambert. He was murdered on the Tiber by agents of Alberic, who seized Spoleto and set himself up as duke.

== Sources ==
- Partner, Peter (1972). The Lands of St Peter: The Papal State in the Middle Ages and the Early Renaissance. University of California Press.
- Caravale, Mario (ed). Dizionario Biografico degli Italiani: LX Grosso – Guglielmo da Forlì. Rome, 2003.
- Caravale, Mario (ed). Dizionario Biografico degli Italiani: LXI Guglielmo Gonzaga – Javobini. Rome, 2003.
- Lexikon des Mittelalters: Wido IV. Herzog von Spoleto (882/83-897).

Italian nobility
| Preceded by Lambert II | Duke of Spoleto; 889–897 | Succeeded by Alberic I |
| Preceded by Lambert II | Margrave of Camerino; 889–897 | Succeeded by Alberic I |
| Vacant Byzantine rule Title last held by Ursus | Prince of Benevento; 895–897 | Succeeded by Radelchis II |
