= Atenulf I of Capua =

Atenulf I (died 910), called the Great (Latin magnus), was the prince of Capua from 7 January 887 and of Benevento from 899, when he conquered that principality. He also used the title princeps gentis Langobardorum: "prince of the Lombard people," an echo of the title used by the earliest prince of Benevento following the collapse of Lombard cohesion in 774.

The son of Landenulf, gastald of Teano, Atenulf, through his influence and conquests, succeeded in vindicating his Lombard family's pretensions to princely status, à la those of Benevento and Salerno. From 879, Capua had been contested between several candidates, but, by 887, Atenulf had removed his brothers and cousins from contention and become sole prince with the assistance of the hypatus Athanasius of Naples. In the next year (888), he was at war with Athanasius over "Liburnia." They fought an indecisive battle at S. Carzio on the Clanio.

Atenulf then turned his attention to Benevento, which had recently been under Byzantine and then Spoletan control. He conquered it from the once-deposed Prince Radelchis II in 899 and was acclaimed prince in Santa Sofia in Benevento in January 900. He was opposed by the one-time regent of Benevento, the Bishop Peter, whom he exiled to Salerno. Having united most of the Lombard Mezzogiorno, he directed his aggression towards the Saracens of the Garigliano.

Atenulf allied with Amalfi and Gregory IV of Naples and attacked and defeated the Saracens in 903. He made himself a vassal of the Byzantines in order to receive military assistance, but got none. He spent the rest of his life preparing for a major second expedition. He died before its fruition, though it resulted in the famous and successful Battle of Garigliano in 915. For his successes against the Muslims, he was the dedicatee of a poem of Eugenio Vulgario. Atenulf was succeeded by his son Landulf I, whom he had associated in the princeship in 901. Atenulf declared the two principalities of Capua and Benevento inseparable and instituted the principle of co-rule between sons and brothers which was to guide the principality until its division in 981.

== Sources ==
- Caravale, Mario (ed). Dizionario Biografico degli Italiani: IV Arconati – Bacaredda. Rome, 1962.

Preceded by Landenulf I	Prince of Capua; 887–910	Succeeded by Landulf I
Preceded by Radelchis II	Prince of Benevento; 900–910	Succeeded by Landulf I
