= Clanio =

Location
- Country: Italy

Physical characteristics
- Mouth: Tyrrhenian Sea
  - coordinates: 40.9830°N 13.9689°E

The Clanio (also: Lagno; Ancient Greek: Γλάνις; Latin: Clanius) is a river on the Campanian plain, southern Italy, noted in antiquity. It rises in the Apennines near Avella, flows past Acerra and discharges into the Tyrrhenian Sea about 4 miles (6 km) south of the Volturno. The Greek origins of its name are linked to the abundance of violets on its banks, as cited in Giulianus Maius's treatise De priscorum proprietate verborum V. Clanius: Clanius fluvius Campaniae prope Acerras a χλανις idest viola, qua ejus ripae abundant.

The town of Acerrae frequently suffered severely from the ravages of its waters during floods. At other times their stagnation rendered the country unhealthy; hence in the seventeenth century the stream was diverted into a canal or artificial course, called il regio Lagno. This is divided into two streams near its mouth, the one of which flows direct into the sea, and is known as Foce dei Lagni, the other takes a more southerly direction, and joins, or rather forms, a marshy lake called the Lago di Patria (the ancient Literna Palus), the outlet of which into the sea, about 7 miles (11 km) miles south of the former branch, called the Foce di Patria. This is evidently the same which was known in ancient times as the river Liternus ternus, and appears to have been then the principal, if not the only outlet of the Clanius, as Strabo, who describes the coast of Campania minutely, does not notice the latter river.
