= List of dukes and princes of Benevento =

This is a list of dukes and princes of Benevento during the Duchy of Benevento between 577–774, the Principality of Benevento between 774–1081, and the Napoleonic creation Principality of Benevento (Napoleonic) between 1806-1815.

== Dukes of Benevento ==
- 571–591 Zotto
- 591–641 Arechis I
- 641–642 Aiulf I
- 642–647 Radoald
- 647–662 Grimoald I (then King of the Lombards, 662–671)
- 662–687 Romoald I
- 687–689 Grimoald II
- 689–706 Gisulf I
- 706–730 Romoald II
- 730–732 Audelais
- 733–739 Gregory
- 739–742 Godescalc
- 742–751 Gisulf II
- 751–758 Liutprand
- 758–774 Arechis II (tried to become king in 774)

== Princes of Benevento ==
Also princes of Capua from 900 to 981.

- 774–787 Arechis II (independent of any royal authority)
- 787–806 Grimoald III
- 806–817 Grimoald IV
- 817–832 Sico I
- 832–839 Sicard
- 839–851 Radelchis I
- 851–854 Radelgar
- 854–878 Adelchis
- 878–881 Waifer
- 881–884 Radelchis II (deposed)
- 884–890 Aiulf II
- 890–891 Orso
- 891–895 To the Byzantines.
- 895–897 Guy (also Duke of Spoleto d.898)
  - 897 Peter, Bishop of Benevento, as regent
- 897–900 Radelchis II (restored)

=== House of Capua ===
- 900–910 Atenulf I the Great
  - 901–910 Landulf I Antipater, co-ruler
- 910–943 Landulf I Antipater, co-ruled from 901 (see directly above)
  - 911–940 Atenulf II, co-ruler
    - 940 Landulf, co-ruler
  - 933–943 Atenulf III Carinola, co-ruler
  - 940–943 Landulf II the Red, co-ruler (perhaps from 939)
- 943–961 Landulf II the Red, co-ruled from 940 (see above)
  - 943–961 Pandulf I Ironhead, co-ruler
  - 959–961 Landulf III, co-ruler
- 961–968 Landulf III, co-ruling with his brother (perhaps to 969, see directly below), also co-ruled from 959 (see directly above)
- 961–981 Pandulf I Ironhead, co-ruling with his brother (see directly above), also co-ruled from 943 (see above), also duke of Spoleto (from 967), Salerno (from 978), and Capua (from 961)
  - 968–981 Landulf IV, co-ruler, briefly sole duke in 981, then duke of Capua (d.993)
- 981–1014 Pandulf II
  - 987–1014 Landulf V, co-ruler
- 1014–1033 Landulf V, co-ruled from 987 (see directly above, d.1053)
  - 1012–1033 Pandulf III, co-ruler (d.1059)
- 1033–1050 Pandulf III, co-ruled from 1012 (see directly above, d.1060)
  - 1038–1050 Landulf VI, co-ruler (d.1077)

In 1050, the Lombard co-princes were expelled from the city by the discontented citizenry. In 1051, the city was given to the pope. In 1053, the Normans who had occupied the duchy itself since 1047 (when the Emperor Henry III gave permission to Humphrey of Hauteville) ceded it to the Pope with whom they had recently made a truce.

== Princes of Benevento under Papal Suzerainty ==
The pope appointed his own rector, but the citizens invited the old princes back and, by 1055, they were ruling again; as vassals of the pope, however.

- 1053–1054 Rudolf, rector
- 1054–1059 Pandulf III (again)
- 1054–1077 Landulf VI, co-ruled from 1038
- 1056–1074 Pandulf IV

== Norman Prince of Benevento ==
- 1078–1081 Robert Guiscard

Guiscard returned it to the Pope, but no new Beneventan prince or dukes were named until the 19th century.

== Prince of Benevento under Napoleon ==
- 1806–1815 Charles Maurice de Talleyrand-Périgord

== Sources ==
- Grierson, Philip and Mark Blackburn, edd. Medieval European Coinage, 1: The Early Middle Ages (5th–10th Centuries). Cambridge: Cambridge University Press, 1986.
- Hallenbeck, Jan T. "Pavia and Rome: The Lombard Monarchy and the Papacy in the Eighth Century". Transactions of the American Philosophical Society, New Series, 72, 4 (1982): 1–186.
- Wickham, Chris. Early Medieval Italy: Central Power and Local Society, 400–1000. London: Macmillan, 1981.
