= John II of Naples =

John II (died 919) was the duke of Naples from 915 to his death. He succeeded his father Gregory IV on the latter's death late in 915.

During his reign, he joined a Christian alliance under Pope John X.

He had accompanied his father to the Battle of the Garigliano under Nicholas Picingli, where the Christian coalition defeated the Moslems of the fortress on the Garigliano.

Preceded by Gregory IV	Duke of Naples; 915–919	Succeeded by Marinus I
