= Atenulf II of Benevento =

Atenulf II (also Atenolf, Atenolfo, Atinolfo, Adenolfo, Atenulfo, or Adenulfo) (died 940) was the younger brother of Prince Landulf I of Benevento, who associated him with the government in June 910 or 911 (as their own father, Atenulf I, had associated Landulf a decade earlier).

In 909, Landulf went to Constantinople to receive the titles of anthypatos and patrikios and Atenulf stayed behind but received like investiture. Atenulf took part in the Battle of Garigliano in 915 and the campaign against the Byzantines in 921 in Apulia, going as far as Ascoli. He continued the war with Byzantium, even calling in Magyar mercenaries under a chieftain named Szovard (Italianised as Salardo). In 929, with Landulf, Guaimar II of Salerno, and Theobald of Spoleto, he invaded Apulia and Calabria again. This time, all were unsuccessful and the old alliance broke up.

He died in 940. He was married, although his wife's name is not known, and they had two sons: Landulf, who seized Salerno in 973, and Atenulf, gastald of Aquino.

== Sources ==
- Caravale, Mario (ed). Dizionario Biografico degli Italiani: IV Arconati – Bacaredda. Rome, 1962.

Preceded by Landulf I	Prince of Benevento and Capua; 911–940; Co-ruler with Landulf I	Succeeded by Landulf I and Landulf II
