= Guaimar I of Salerno =

Guaimar I (also Waimar, Gaimar, or Guaimario) (c. 855 – 901) was the prince of Salerno from 880, when his father entered the monastery of Monte Cassino in August. His parents were Prince Guaifer and Landelaica, daughter of Lando I of Capua. From 877, he was associated with his father on the throne, a practice which had begun with the previous dynasty and continued until the end of Salernitan independence in 1078.

He came to the assistance of the Emperor Charles the Bald against the Saracens in 877, but Charles did not do any fighting before leaving Italy. The Saracens settled in Agropoli in 881 and threatened Salerno itself. Besides Saracens, Guaimar also had to fight the duke-bishop Athanasius of Naples, who was ruling over Capua, technically a Salernitan vassal. In 886, he travelled with Lando II of Capua to Constantinople and did homage, returning in 887 with the title of patrician from the emperor. He received a contingent of mercenaries and returned to ward off the Saracen menace.

Benevento had fallen under Byzantine control by that time and Guaimar married Itta, daughter of Guy II of Spoleto, and sister of Guy IV of Spoleto. Guy, with the prince's aid, reconquered Benevento in 895, increasing the prestige of Guaimar, whom he offered to make regent of Benevento. It is not certain whether Guaimar accepted, but he tried to assassinate the gastald of Avellino, Adelferio, and was taken prisoner with his wife whatever the case. Guy had to come down and besiege the town to rescue him. He returned to Salerno disgraced.

In 893, Guaimar had made his son, also Guaimar, co-prince, and it was he who ruled Salerno in the elder Guaimar's absence. Upon the elder prince's return, a Neapolitan faction in the city, supported by Athanasius, revolted, but the two Guaimars put it down and the elder, like his father before him, retired (or was forced by his son) to a monastery, San Massimo, Guaifer's foundation, in 900 or 901, dying soon after. The chronicles of his reign describe him in despotic terms and he does not seem to have been popular, despite the later popularity of his name within the dynasty his father founded.

Regnal titles
Preceded by Guaifer	Prince of Salerno; 880–901	Succeeded by Guaimar II
