= Chronicon Salernitanum =

The Chronicon Salernitanum, or "Salerno Chronicle", is an anonymous 10th century chronicle of the history of the Principality of Salerno. It was probably written around 990 (or 974) and has been attributed to Radoald of Salerno, Abbot of San Benedetto, by Huguette Taviani-Carozzi. It "has some claims to literary merit" and the "matter is good despite the lack of critical ability which disfigures the work," according to the Catholic Encyclopedia.
