= History of Benevento =

History of the municipality of Benevento, Italy

The history of Benevento encompasses a series of events that have shaped the city of Benevento from antiquity to the present day.

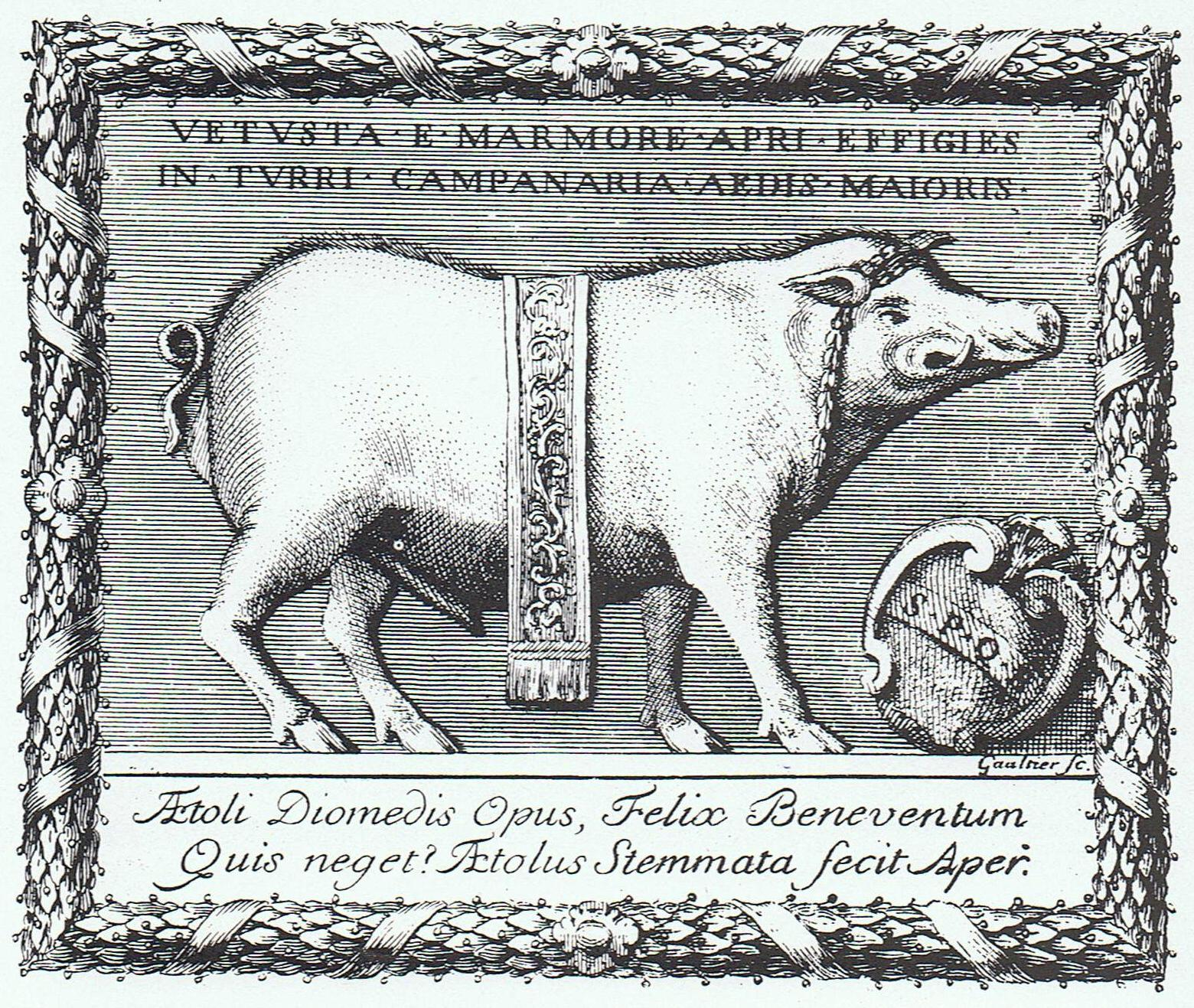
Engraving by P.J. Gaultier, based on a drawing by G.B. Natali, depicting the Calydonian boar, a symbol of the city of Benevento. According to legend, the Achaean hero Diomedes founded Benevento and, as a token of recognition, left the city the tusks of the Calydonian Boar that his uncle Meleager had slain in the forests of Aetolia.

== Origin of the name ==
According to the theory proposed by Raffaele Garrucci, the original name of the city was, in the Oscan language, Malies or Malocis, later changed to Maloenton (or possibly Maloenta or Malowent). This hypothesis is based on the discovery of a bronze coin from the 4th century BC, bearing the inscription Malies in the exergue, along with a depiction of a woman's head with her hair bound in a sakkos. The reverse features a bull with a human face and, above it, a bearded head. Another contemporary coin displays a bull on the reverse with a helmet featuring cheek guards above it, and on the obverse, a youthful head, possibly representing Apollo.

According to another historian, Gianni Vergineo, the original name of the city, Maloenton, has Greek origins. Malòeis, derived from Malon, a Doric variant of the Attic Mèlon (this Doric aspect connects to the mythical founder of Benevento, Diomedes), meaning a flock of sheep or goats, is an adjectival form indicating an area abundant with herds of sheep and goats, clearly referencing the widespread forestry and pastoral activities practiced by the Samnites. Vergineo also does not rule out the derivation of Maloenton from mallos (fleece of a sheep).

The genitive of Malòeis is entos, thus Malòentos. Due to the similarity of the morpheme entos with iontos (genitive of the present participle of iènai = to come), the Romans interpreted the original name of Benevento as implying a "bad event" (malum eventum). Only after the victory over Pyrrhus in 272 BC was the name transformed into Beneventum, signifying a good omen.

Another hypothesis links the origin of the name to another animal symbol of Benevento, the bull, a symbol of the Samnites. The Greek poet Theocritus refers to the bull as Malon.

== Mythical foundation ==
The legendary foundation of Benevento is tied to the mythological figure of Diomedes, an Achaean celebrated in Homer's Odyssey for his valor and credited by various historians with founding numerous cities in Daunia.

According to the myth, Diomedes, a victim of marital infidelity, was forced to leave his Greek homeland and come to Italy, where he founded Arpi and assisted King Daunus in a war against the Messapians. The king denied him the promised reward (a portion of the kingdom), but Diomedes persisted, claiming his right. A natural brother of Diomedes, acting as a judge, ruled against him because he was enamored with Daunus's daughter, Evippe. The Achaean hero then seized a portion of the kingdom, marking its boundaries with stones. Daunus had the stones removed, but they miraculously returned to their place.

The Beneventan version of the myth is provided by Procopius (6th century), who states that "the city was founded by Diomedes, son of Tydeus, expelled from Argos after the fall of Troy. As a token of recognition, he left the city the tusks of the Calydonian Boar, which his uncle Meleager had killed as a hunting trophy: they are still there and are a spectacle to behold, with their crescent shape and a length of no less than three spans."

The Calydonian Boar mentioned in the legend became, during the Middle Ages, the symbol of Benevento, to the extent that it is still depicted in the city's coat of arms. In this regard, a 19th-century Beneventan historian notes that the noble origin of Benevento "is fully testified by the Greek marble coat of arms embedded in the bell tower of the archbishopric, depicting the Calydonian Boar killed by Meleager, Diomedes' uncle, in the forests of Aetolia; and the same hunt is observed in a bas-relief existing in the archiepiscopal palace."

The hero Diomedes is also linked to the foundation of Argyrippa (the city of the horse). Two ancient Beneventan coins from the Roman period depict the figure of a horse with the inscription Malies on the older one (4th century BC) and Beneventod on the more recent one.

== Pre-Roman era ==
The strategic position and environmental conditions of the area have long attracted populations from various eras. Over the years, occasional excavations have uncovered several traces of settlements dating back to the Neolithic period. In the second half of the 20th century, an archaeological exploration in the garden of the former La Salle college in Piazzetta Vari revealed a necropolis from the Orientalizing period (late 8th century BC to early 7th century BC). Other ceramic and bronze artifacts (8th–7th centuries BC), unearthed in various excavation campaigns, are preserved in the Museum of Samnium.

A subsequent phase of Benevento's history is linked to the events of the Samnites. It is likely that the Beneventan territory served as a meeting point for various Samnite tribes, including the Hirpini (who, settled also on the surrounding highlands, likely controlled the area directly), the Pentri, and the Caudini. Initially, human presence was predominantly rural, with a few scattered villages based on an agro-pastoral economy. However, starting in the 4th century BC (during the Samnite Wars), a more organized proto-urban settlement developed in a more defensible position. From this period, two Samnite necropolises have been discovered close to each other, one near the former La Salle college and the other at the Rocca dei Rettori, characterized by earthen tumuli of varying shapes covering one or more burials. Notable among these is a tomb constructed with squared yellow and gray tuff blocks, forming a sealed chamber with a chest-like cover; inside, a staircase was found, created by compacting stone flakes into steps. The skeleton was accompanied by modest but valuable grave goods, including a bronze patera containing an iron knife, two iron fibulae, and a bronze buckle. A contemporary necropolis was also found on the city outskirts in the Olivola district, where warrior tombs with belts and weapons were uncovered.

== Roman period ==
=== Republican era ===
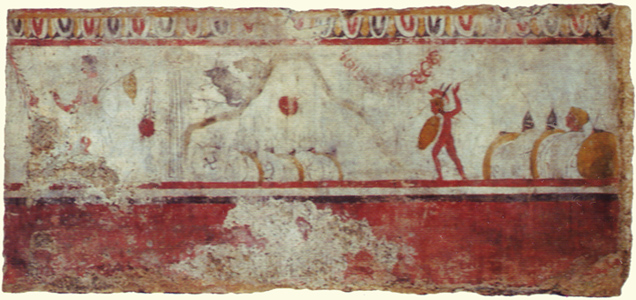
Scene depicting the Samnite victory over the Romans at the Battle of the Caudine Forks.

The Samnium region was the theater of three wars against the Romans. In the Third Samnite War (298 BC–290 BC), the Romans defeated the Samnites' allies one by one, ultimately forcing them into a peace treaty. It seems that Maleventum was conquered by Rome, though the precise occasion is unknown. It was certainly in Roman hands by 275 BC, when they definitively subdued their enemies following the victory over Pyrrhus, King of Epirus, there. In 268 BC, it became a Roman colony with the rights of Latin cities and was renamed Beneventum.

During the Second Punic War, it was repeatedly used by Roman generals as an important outpost due to its proximity to Campania and its strength as a fortress. In its immediate vicinity, two of the war's most decisive actions took place: in 214 BC, the Carthaginian general Hanno was defeated by the Proconsul Tiberius Sempronius Gracchus, and in 212 BC, Hanno's camp, where he had amassed a large quantity of grain and other supplies, was stormed and captured by the Consul Quintus Fulvius Flaccus. Despite its territory being repeatedly ravaged by the Carthaginians, Beneventum was still one of the 18 Latin colonies that, in 209 BC, could and willingly provided the requested quota of men and money to continue the war.

There is no mention of Benevento during the Social War (91 BC–88 BC): it seems to have escaped the calamities that afflicted many Samnite cities at that time, and by the end of the Roman Republic, it was described as a rather prosperous city, located at the intersection of the Via Appia and the Via Minucia (later the Via Appia Traiana).

=== Imperial era ===
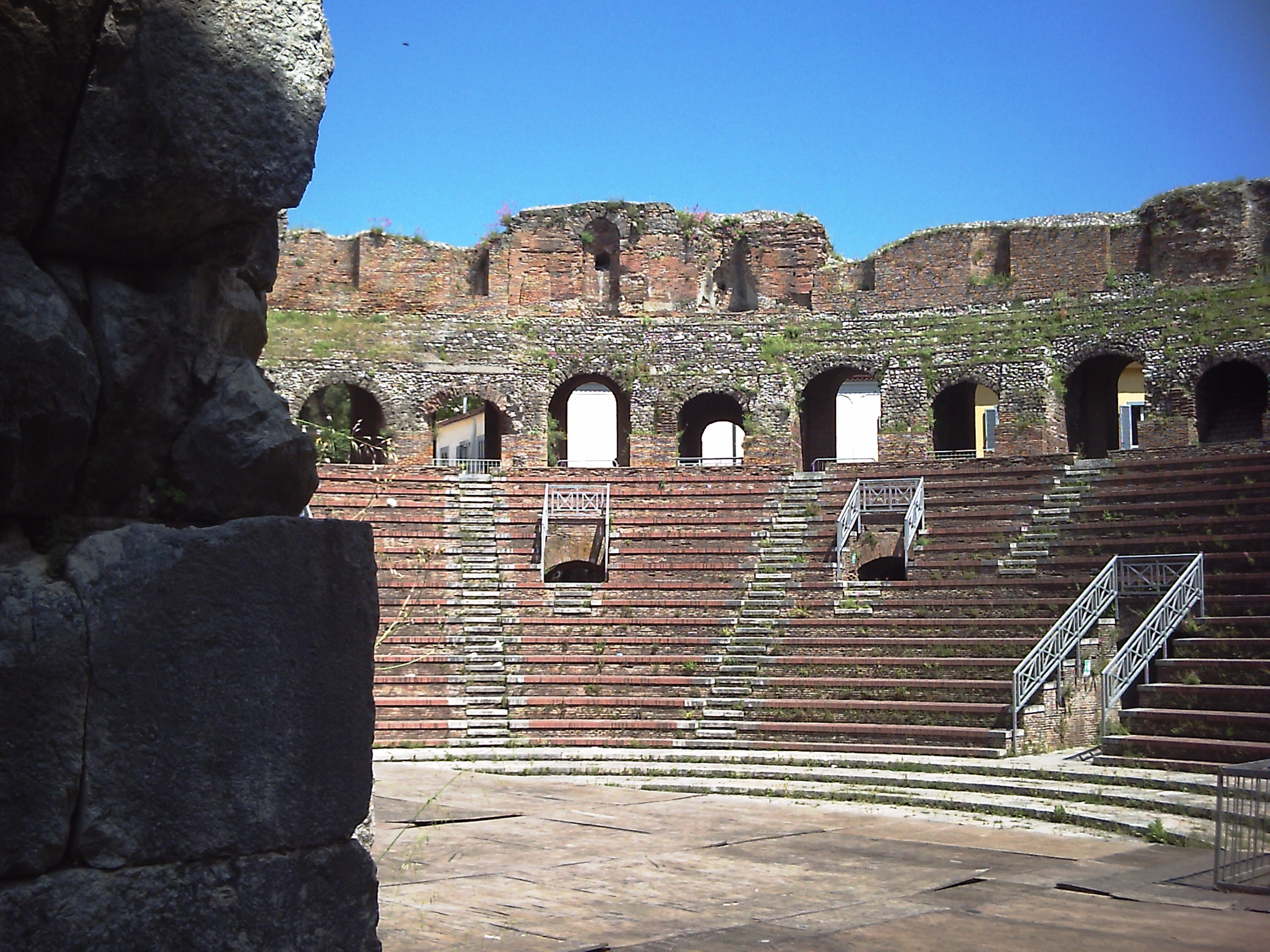
The Roman Theatre of Benevento was inaugurated in 126 under Hadrian. With a capacity of fifteen thousand people, it attests to the city's importance during the imperial era.

In 42 BC, under the Second Triumvirate, Lucius Munatius Plancus established a colony for veterans in Benevento (Iulia Concordia Felix Beneventum). The city's territory was significantly expanded, incorporating that of Caudium; a third colony was established by Nero. In inscriptions from the reign of Septimius Severus, the city bore the title Colonia Julia Augusta Concordia Felix Beneventum.

Administratively, during the imperial era, the city (along with nearby Irpinia) was definitively detached from Samnium and initially incorporated into the Regio II Apulia et Calabria (i.e., Apulia) by Emperor Augustus, before being reassigned to Campania following the administrative reform by Hadrian

The historian Mario Rotili describes Roman Benevento at its peak as follows: "At its height, the city extended from the Ponte Leproso and the Pons Maior (Fratto Bridge) in the west to the area surrounding the Arch of Trajan in the east, with the Calore River marking the northern boundary and the Sabato River the southern one. In the far eastern part stood the Temple of Isis, built under Domitian in 88 AD, the Temple of Minerva Berecynthia, and the grand Arch of Trajan, erected between 114 and 117 AD at the start of the new road that shortened the route of the Appia and was named after the wise emperor. In the central part of the city were the Temple of Jupiter and a complex of sumptuous buildings, including the arch now called the Sacramento Arch; in the western part were the forum with the underlying cryptoporticus of the Santi Quaranta, the Basilica, the Sagittari porticoes, the so-called Commodian baths, the headquarters of various colleges, the Diana portico, the Longinus basilica, and the monumental theater, largely preserved."

The importance and prosperous condition of Beneventum under the Roman Empire are sufficiently attested by the numerous ruins and inscriptions. Its wealth is also confirmed by the large number of coins it minted. Its prosperity was undoubtedly due to its favorable position along the Via Appia, at the junction of its two main branches (one of which later became the Via Traiana). The famous stop at Beneventum is recounted in Horace's narrative of his journey from Rome to Brundisium. Its advantageous location also earned it the honor of repeated visits from emperors, notably those of Nero, Trajan, and Septimius Severus. Subsequent emperors granted the city additional territories and erected, or at least lent their names to, various public buildings.

It appears that Roman Benevento was also a hub of significant literary activity, starting with the grammarian Orbilius Pupillus, who taught for a long time in his native city before moving to Rome and was honored with a statue by his fellow citizens. Inscriptions also record similar honors for another grammarian, Rutilius Aelianus, and various orators and poets of local renown.

=== Origins of Christianity ===
According to an undocumented legend, the first bishop of Benevento was Saint Photinus, consecrated by Saint Peter in 40 AD.

The first bishop with documented evidence is Saint Januarius, born around 272 in Benevento and martyred in 305 during the Diocletianic persecution of Christians.

In 313 AD, the Edict of Milan granted freedom of worship. Two centuries later, in 526, the cardinal priest Saint Felix of Samnium, the first Beneventan to succeed the Apostle Peter, was elected pope.

== From the fall of the Roman Empire to the arrival of the Lombards ==
After the fall of the Roman Empire (476 AD), so-called barbarian populations invaded Italy, devastating the lands and occupying major cities, which fell to the force of their arms. Benevento was no exception.

The Goths, led by Theodoric, violently entered the city in 490, but were later expelled by Belisarius, a general of the Eastern Emperor Justinian, between 536 and 537. Totila, king of the Goths, taking advantage of internal discord fomented by himself between supporters of the Goths and those of the Eastern Emperor, recaptured the city in 545, destroyed its finest buildings, and razed its walls.

Narses, another general of the Eastern Emperor, after defeating the Goths at the foot of Mount Vesuvius and driving the Franks out of Italy (for which he was appointed Exarch), forcibly annexed the city to Byzantine rule.

Subsequently, the city fell into the hands of the Lombards, who, in 571, established the Duchy of Benevento.

Upon the arrival of the Lombards, led by Zotto (570), the city was in a dire state. The population, consisting of native Samnites, Romans from various colonial deductions, recently integrated Goths, and Byzantines of diverse origins, lived in extreme hardship, plagued by famines and pestilences, within an urban fabric torn apart by decades of warfare.

== Lombard period ==
The Duchy of Benevento in the 8th century

=== The duchy ===
==== Zotto and Arechis I ====
Historians typically divide the period of Lombard domination into three distinct phases. The first, called the ascendant phase (570–774), is characterized by conflicts with the Byzantines and the victorious conquest of new territories. The second, known as the culminating phase (774–849), begins with the fall of the Lombard kingdom of Pavia to the Franks. This event did not negatively affect Benevento; rather, it allowed the local Lombards to act freely, without superior influences, and to transform the duchy into a principality. The third, descending phase (849–1077), reflects the slow decline of the principality, constantly threatened by Muslim invaders.

The Lombards made Benevento the capital of a powerful Lombard Duchy which, though essentially independent, operated within the sphere of influence of the Lombard kingdom in northern Italy. The first duke was Zotto, who governed the fief from 570 until his death in 590. During his twenty-year rule, Zotto, though "Arian or pagan," managed to establish relations with the local population and possibly reorganize the urban center, laying the initial administrative foundations.

Zotto's successor was Arechis I, appointed by King Agilulf. The second duke of Benevento ruled for many years, expanded the duchy's borders, and consolidated its internal power, making it an autonomous dominion. Among other conquests, he captured Capua and Salerno. A letter sent to him by Pope Gregory I, in which the pontiff honors his glory as a warrior, calling him gloriose fili, suggests that Arechis had already converted to Catholicism.

On his deathbed, Arechis I recommended his trusted allies Radoald and Grimoald as successors, excluding his son Aiulf, whom he deemed unfit to lead the duchy. However, upon his death, Aiulf succeeded him and received the loyalty of the Lombard nobles, including Radoald and Grimoald. After a year and five months, an army of Slavs threatened the duchy's borders, and Aiulf, in the absence of his loyal troops, marched against them but fell from his horse into a ditch. Aiulf was then attacked and brutally killed, but his death was avenged by Radoald, who assumed leadership of the duchy in 642. In 647, Grimoald succeeded him, ruling the duchy for twenty-five years.

==== Grimoald, Romuald I, and the Siege of Benevento in 663 ====
In 662, Grimoald intervened in the succession struggle for the Lombard kingdom between Godepert and Perctarit, the two sons of Aripert I, whose will had divided the kingdom between them. Grimoald, aiming to seize the throne for himself, took advantage of Godepert's request for aid, offering him his sister in marriage. Legitimized by this union, Grimoald entrusted the duchy to his son Romuald and marched north with troops from his duchy, as well as those of Spoleto and Tuscia. Arriving in Pavia, Godepert's chosen capital, he killed the legitimate king; in Milan, Perctarit, aware of his inferiority, abandoned the kingdom and fled to the Avars. Grimoald thus became king of the Lombards. Grimoald was succeeded in the duchy by Romuald I, who faced the advance of the Byzantine army led by Emperor Constans II. After landing at Taranto, Constans moved victoriously toward Benevento, intending to free Italy from the Lombards. Upon reaching the city, he surrounded and besieged it with his entire army. Romuald had no choice but to request aid from his father, which arrived despite numerous desertions. Meanwhile, Sesuald (or Gesuald), Romuald's tutor, was captured by the enemy. When questioned about his origins, Sesuald frightened Constans by claiming that a large army led by Grimoald was approaching. Constans employed a ruse: while negotiating with Romuald to reach Naples, he brought Sesuald to Benevento's walls under threat of death, ordering him to tell the besieged not to hope for Grimoald's aid, as he was detained far away. Sesuald, standing before the walls, spoke the truth, and this act of patriotism cost him his life: beheaded, his head was catapulted into the city, where Romuald kissed it in tears. Constans was forced to lift the siege to head to Naples, but at Capua, he was stopped and heavily defeated by local Lombards. To honor Sesuald's heroic deeds, Romuald granted his descendants a fief along the southern borders of the duchy.

==== Saint Barbatus, the conversion of the Lombards, and the legend of the witches ====
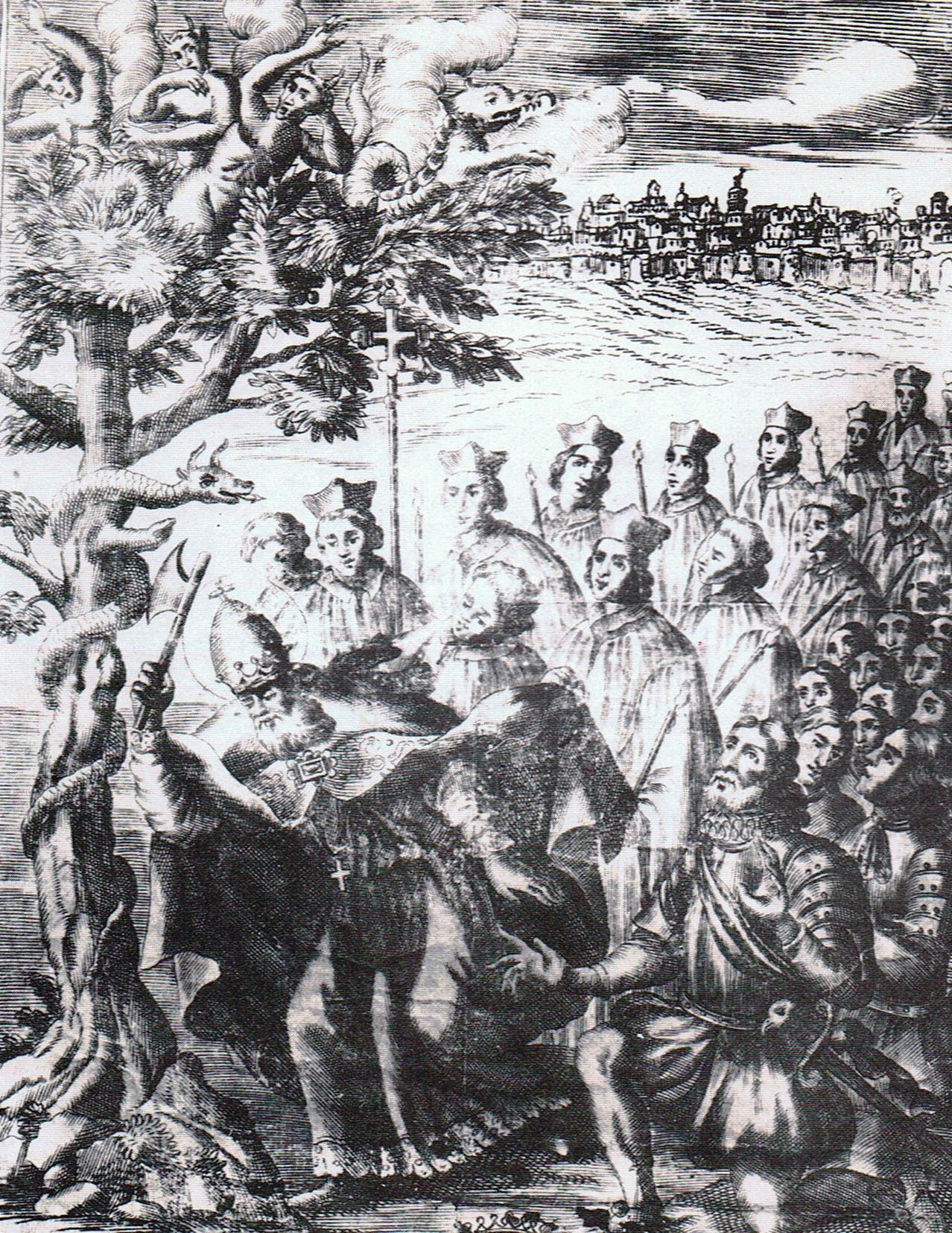
18th-century Beneventan engraving depicting the felling of the witches' walnut tree by Bishop Barbatus.

The figure of Saint Barbatus, bishop of Benevento, is shrouded in legend. A 17th-century historian recounts that Barbatus converted the Lombards, including their duke, to Christian worship, as they were still tied to idolatry through the cult of the viper and "other indignities." As bishop for nineteen years, he governed the diocese with great sanctity, urging the Lombards to abandon superstitions and fully embrace the true faith. The siege by Constans II and the hardships of war compelled the Lombards to abandon idolatrous cults and fell the demonic walnut tree around which strange rituals took place.

According to legend, as the tree was uprooted, "from its disturbed roots emerged a scaly serpent, the devil."

Recurring gatherings took place around the tree, during which participants would shoot arrows at a goatskin hung from a branch and then chew parts of it to acquire the strength it contained. This omophagic ritual was a totemic banquet in which the raw flesh of the sacrificed animal was consumed.

From this primitive practice, used by the early Lombards, arose the legend of the witches, which originated in the 12th and 13th centuries. According to the legend, witches would gather around the walnut tree to perform strange dances and magical rituals. The physician Pietro Piperno meticulously describes one such gathering in his book: "A certain Lamberto Alotario [...] on the eve of Corpus Christi, late at night, under the light of the humid moon, left our city. Barely two miles away, he saw in the plain near the Sabato River, in the fertile land of the illustrious Beneventan patrician Francesco Ianuario, a man adorned with every virtue, a large crowd of men and women dancing and singing: 'Welcome Thursday and Friday.' Believing they were reapers and gleaners, he approached them and, with a rhythmic and melodious voice, added in reply: 'And Saturday and Sunday.' This jest, though he was hunchbacked and a foreigner, pleased everyone, and he joined in the dance. But after the dancing, exhausted, under a tall, spacious, and large walnut tree, they approached a place not far from the river, where many tables laden with succulent foods were ready. Perhaps out of hunger or an ambitious desire for play, trusting his hosts, he was the first to sit at the table. Suddenly, a demon, from behind, with ineffable force and skill, and with intense but temporary pain and remarkable speed, adjusted his dislocated vertebrae, moving the hunchback's protuberance from his back to his chest. As he exclaimed, 'O Jesus! O Virgin Mary!', everyone vanished instantly along with the food and lights. Then, touching his back with his hand, he found the hump gone. The hunch that his eyes could not see before, they now saw in front as a terrible and lamentable impediment. Lamberto, gathering courage, realized that those women were witches."

==== Successors of Romuald I ====
The successors of Romuald after his death (687) continued the work of governing and improving the duchy. In particular, fully converted to Christianity, they sponsored the construction of churches and sanctuaries, such as the monastery of San Pietro, dedicated to virgins consecrated to God, and the monasteries of Santa Maria in Locosano and Santa Maria in Castagneto.

After the brief reign of Grimoald II, the crown passed to his brother Gisulf I, who, taking advantage of the conflict between the papacy and the Eastern Emperor, annexed Sora, Arpino, Arce, and Aquino. His successor, Romuald II, received gifts and concessions from Pope Sisinnius and seized Cumae from the Duke of Naples.

In 732, after the death of Romuald II (married to a niece of King Liutprand, from whom he had a minor son, Gisulf), an autonomist faction led by the gastald Audelais opposed the succession. King Liutprand intervened, deposed the usurper, and installed another nephew, Gregory, previously duke of Chiusi, as duke until Gisulf came of age, bringing the duchy under his full control.

Gisulf II was succeeded by his son Liutprand of Benevento, who supported the anti-papal policy of the new Lombard king Aistulf, even participating in the siege of Rome in 756. With Aistulf's death and the rise of Desiderius to the throne, Liutprand distanced himself from the royal Lombard court, forging ties with the Franks. As a result, King Desiderius marched on Benevento and replaced Liutprand, who fled to Otranto, with Arechis II, who had married the king's daughter, Adelperga.

=== The principality ===
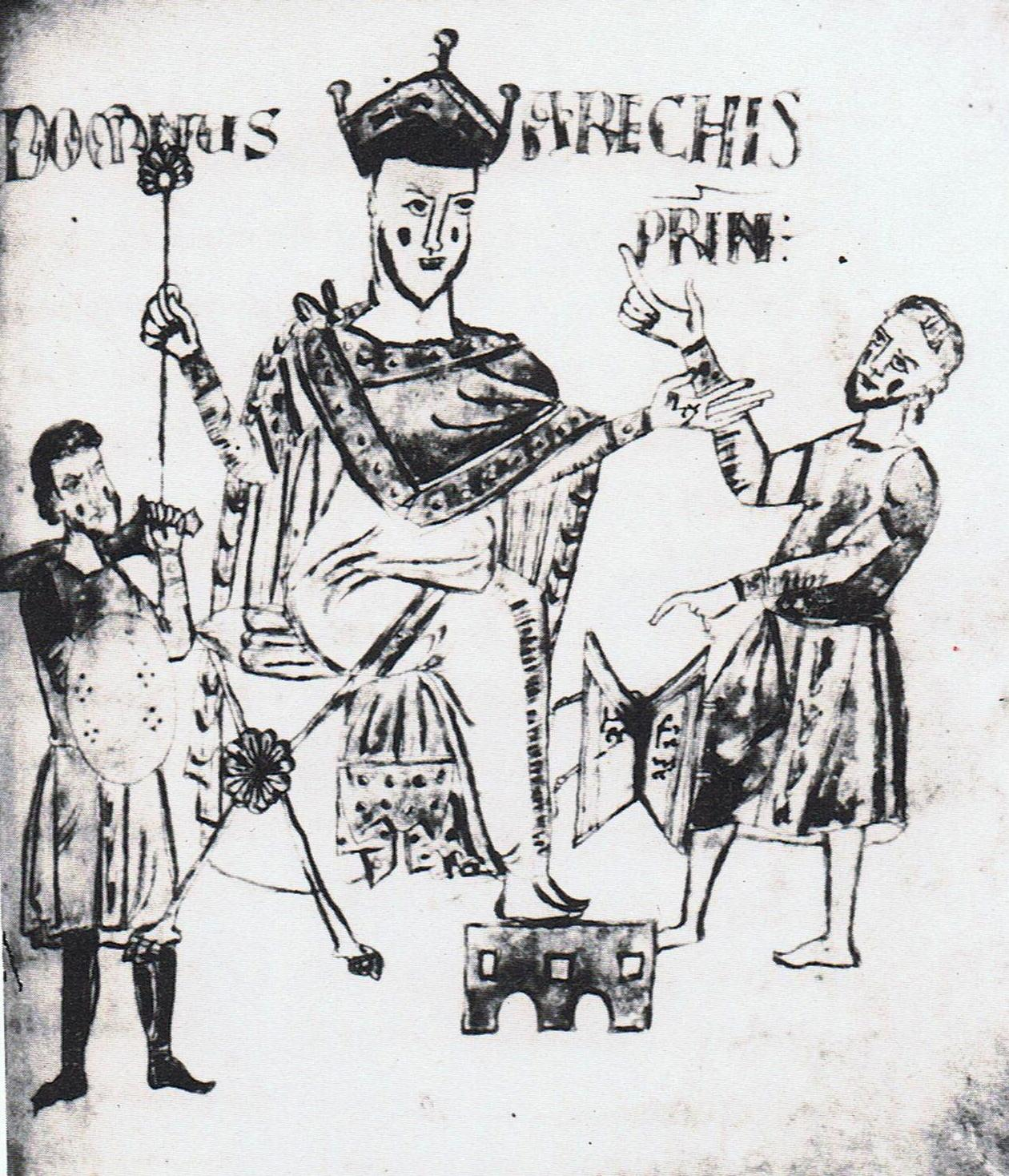
Arechis, Prince of Benevento, with a dignitary and a man-at-arms.

==== Arechis II and his successors ====
After the fall of Langobardia Maior to the Franks (774), Duke Arechis II became a vassal of Charlemagne. The recognition of Frankish sovereignty, imposed by circumstances, lost all value once the Frankish threat receded. Indeed, a few years later, Arechis proclaimed himself dux et princeps samnitium, adding the title of prince, meaning an independent sovereign, to that of duke, a lord dependent on the king of Italy, Pepin. In this regard, the Cassino chronicler attests that "Arechis, for the first time, ordered that he be called prince. To give effect to this self-proclamation, he had himself consecrated by the bishops, adorned himself with a crown, and in his public acts ordered the addition of the formula: written from our most sacred palace."

Arechis made Benevento a second Pavia. He welcomed refugees from the dissolved Lombard kingdom and ensured the dignified preservation of his people's relics (reliquiae Langobardorum gentis). He built the Church of Santa Sofia, with a star-shaped plan, and sponsored other civil and religious construction projects.

In November 774, shortly after being solemnly crowned prince, Arechis II sent members of the Cortisani and Baccari families from Benevento to occupy the middle area of the Biferno River.

Upon Arechis's death (787), his son Grimoald III became prince and immediately set to work reducing Byzantine influence in southern Italy. In a fierce battle, Grimoald defeated the Byzantines, earning the admiration of Charlemagne. Under his rule, the power of the aristocracy strengthened, which proved decisive in electing his successor, Grimoald IV. The latter, part of his predecessor's guard, ruled the principality briefly due to a palace conspiracy orchestrated by Sico, gastald of Acerenza, which led to his demise.

Sico I attacked the coastal duchies (Naples, Amalfi, Sorrento, etc.) and dominated Naples, imposing heavy tributes and ransoming the city after taking the body of Saint Januarius hostage. His son Sicard I continued his father's expansionist policy but was forced by the Neapolitans to make peace on 4 July 836. At Lipari, he seized the precious relics of Saint Bartholomew from the Saracens and brought them to Benevento, where they are still preserved. He died in 839 due to a conspiracy.

==== The civil war between Benevento and Salerno ====
When Sicard's treasurer, Radelchis, secured the succession, the nobles of Salerno, along with the gastalds of Conza, Acerenza, and Capua, rebelled and elected Siconulf as an anti-prince. The two factions descended into war, not hesitating to hire Saracen mercenaries, Libyans, and Eastern refugees to prevail over one another. After ten years of war, in 849, Emperor Louis II, concerned about the use of Muslim mercenaries, intervened in Italy and arbitrated the local disputes. He divided the principality into two parts, assigning them to the respective contenders in exchange for their joint commitment to fight the infidels and their oaths of loyalty.

This marked the beginning of the principality's decline. The division was formally an act of donation from Radelchis to Siconulf. Benevento ceded to Salerno the gastaldates of Taranto, Cassano, Cosenza, Laino, Latiniano, Montella, Furculae, and half of Acerenza, along with the city of Salerno. Benevento retained the districts of Brindisi, Bari, Canosa, Lucera, Siponto, Ascoli, Bovino, Sant'Agata, Telese, Alife, Isernia, Bojano, Larino, Biferno, and Campobasso. A few years later, in 860, the secession of the Capua gastaldate stripped further territories from Benevento.

Relations between Emperor Louis II and the princes of Benevento grew strained. The new prince, Adelchis, openly displayed hostility toward Louis, offering refuge and protection to the emperor's enemies. Louis secretly prepared to attack Benevento. Adelchis, aware of this, captured Louis during a visit to Benevento and held him prisoner for just over a month. The event reverberated across Europe and was seen as a bold affront to the powerful emperor, deemed "holy and pious," defender of Christianity and papal claims. Louis II was freed on 17 September 871 under an oath never to re-enter Benevento with arms. The following year, Pope Adrian II released him from this oath. The emperor, descending to Capua, organized an army to march against Adelchis to avenge the affront. However, the plan failed, and Louis II was forced to return to Brescia, where he died in 875.

==== From Adelchis to Pandulf Ironhead ====
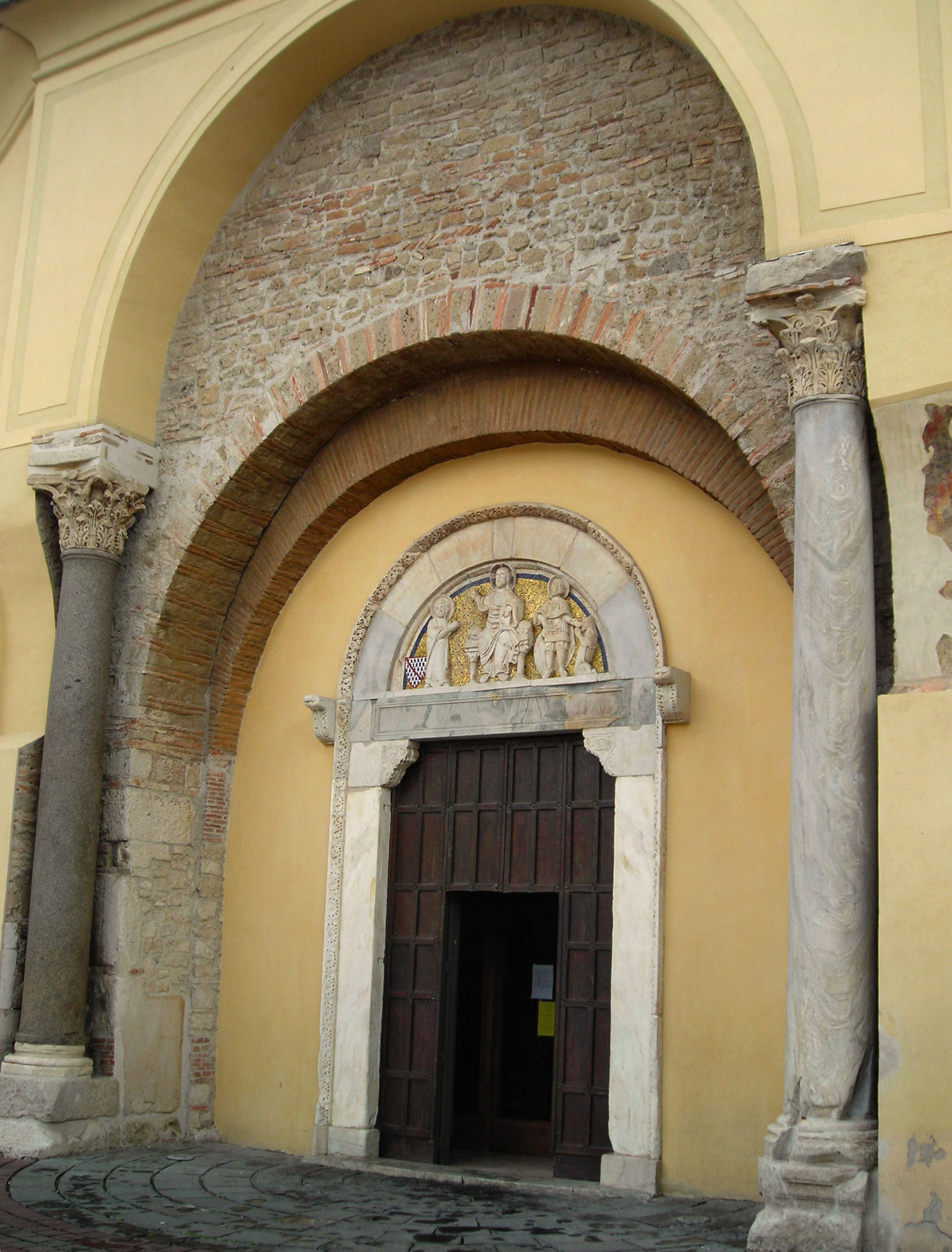
View of the Church of Santa Sofia, an example of Lombard architecture.

With imperial interference ended, Adelchis focused on strengthening the principality's defenses to counter Byzantine advances and, above all, to curb the devastating Saracen raids. After numerous military campaigns with both successes and failures, Adelchis was forced to negotiate with Sawdan, the Saracen leader, paying a substantial sum and providing hostages in exchange for a promise not to attack the principality. Sawdan then turned toward Capua and Naples, sacking them. The Saracen army decided to return to Bari, but on the way back, between Dugenta and Telese, they encountered the army of the gastalds of Telese and Bojano. The fierce battle ended with another victory for the infidels, who destroyed Telese, Benevento, and nearby lands.

After Adelchis's death in 878 due to a conspiracy, he was succeeded first by Gaideris and then by Aiulf II, who continued the fight against Saracens and Byzantines. In 884, Aiulf managed to conquer Bari and expel the Saracens, but upon his death, the Byzantines took advantage of the lack of a strong heir to besiege Benevento. After a long and heroic resistance, the city capitulated. The Lombard court was expelled, but Guy IV of Spoleto liberated it (885) and assigned it to Radelchis II of Benevento, Adelchis's son, who returned from twelve years of exile. The new prince ruled harshly and brutally. His authoritarian demeanor lost him support among large segments of the nobility and the church, who sought aid from the lords of Capua. Atenulf I of Capua rushed to Benevento, deposed Radelchis, and proclaimed himself prince.

The Beneventan nobles soon grew weary of their new prince, resentful of the city's demotion compared to Capua. They acclaimed Bishop Peter and sought to place him at the head of the principality, but Atenulf, to quell the rebels, exiled the bishop to Salerno and introduced a new form of government. This system, designed to prevent dynastic wars, involved shared governance among brothers and sons. Atenulf also formed a military league and defeated a powerful Saracen colony that had devastated abbeys and monasteries in Campania. His son Landulf I of Benevento sought Byzantine aid to definitively defeat the Saracens. Emperor Leo VI the Wise granted him the coveted title of imperial patrician but, to avoid conflicting with imperial interests, refused to provide military support. Nevertheless, Landulf, in a few years, formed a large military league of local powers sponsored by Pope John X. In 915, a concerted assault by the Christian league's forces succeeded in annihilating the Muslim invaders.

Landulf had to face increasingly aggressive Byzantines. In 921, he capitalized on a revolt against the Byzantine governor to conquer part of Apulia but was repelled. He was succeeded by Landulf II of Benevento and Pandulf Ironhead. The latter united Capua, Salerno, and Benevento into a single principality, adding other territories. Pandulf's hostility to papal claims brought him closer to Emperor Otto I of Saxony, who also granted him governance of Spoleto and Camerino. Amid this tangle of papal and imperial interests, Benevento achieved significant recognition when, in 969, Pope John XIII elevated the local diocese to a metropolitan see.

==== The end of the principality ====
Upon Pandulf's death, Benevento passed to his eldest son, Landulf IV, who was soon deposed and later killed alongside his brother in a battle in 982. The orchestrator of Landulf's deposition, Pandulf II, continued his predecessor's pro-imperial policy and offered continuous hospitality to Otto III. In 1002, he heroically repelled a Saracen attack. Pandulf was succeeded by Landulf V, who had to contend not only with the Byzantines but also with the new conquerors of southern Italy, the powerful Normans.

The pro-imperial policy ended with Pandulf III, who, in 1047, boldly closed the city's gates to Emperor Henry III the Black and Pope Clement II, who excommunicated him. This dramatic gesture stemmed from the Beneventan dynasty's feeling of being surrounded on all fronts: on one side, the emperor allocated Lombard lands to the Normans; on the other, the pope claimed ownership of Benevento. As the Normans advanced, the principality shrank, and the Beneventan princes could only watch helplessly as their dominion ended. The confirmation of the excommunication by Pope Leo IX intensified pressure on the city, creating deep divisions within the nobility. The pro-papal faction prevailed, and from 1050 to 1055, the city remained in the pope's hands. The Beneventans rebelled and recalled the princes, who returned to govern Benevento after pledging vassalage to the Holy See, with the city's effective transfer to the dynasty completed. With the death of the last Capuan Lombard prince, Landulf VI, in 1077, Lombard domination ended, and papal rule began.

== Papal domination ==
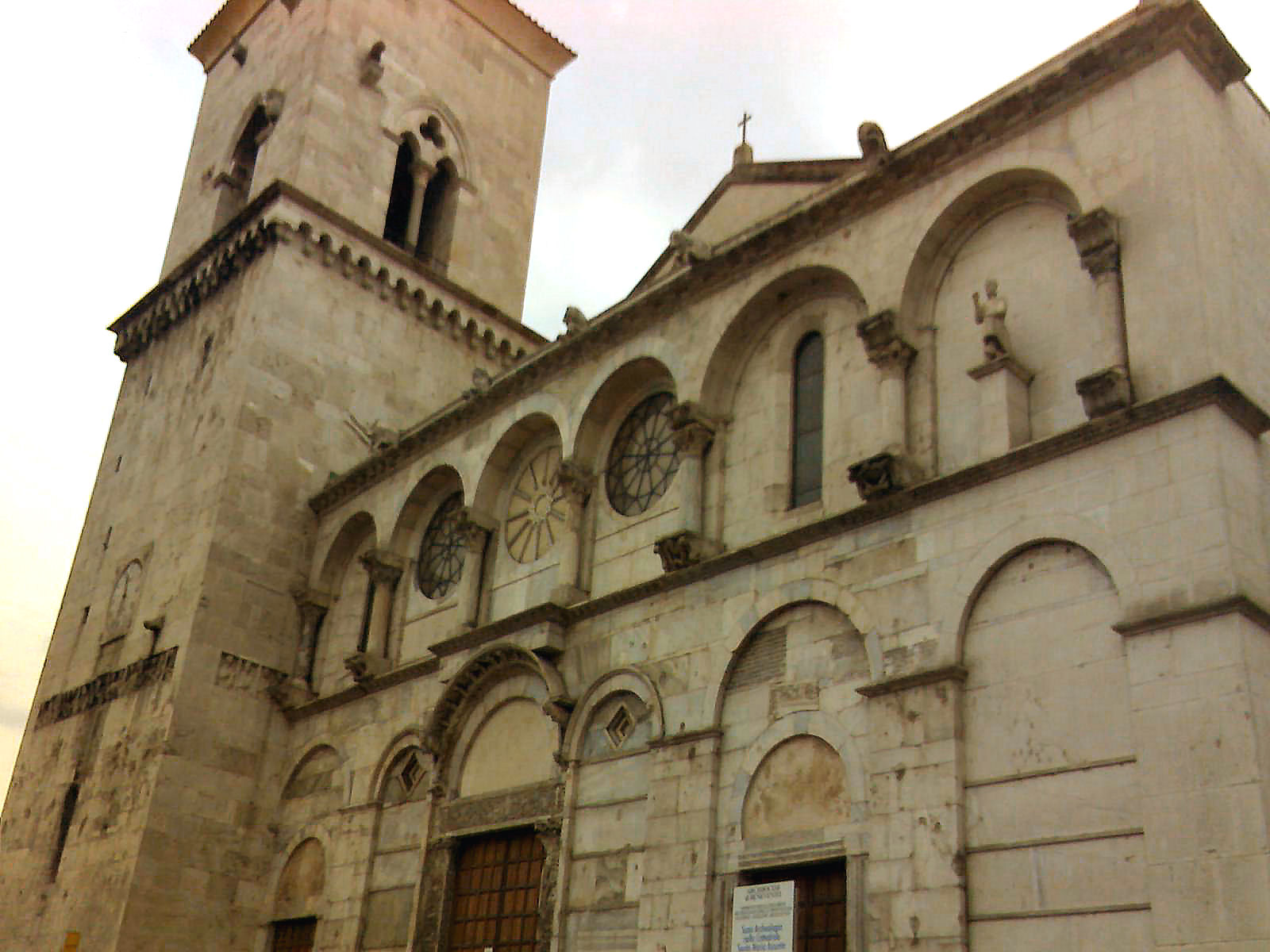
The facade and bell tower of the Benevento Cathedral were constructed in the 13th century during the episcopates of Ruggero and Romano Capodiferro.

=== From 1077 to the city statutes of 1202 ===
In 1077, papal domination officially began. The city's governance was entrusted to two rectors, chosen by the notables from among the court's prominent figures, subject to papal approval. The first two rectors were Stefano Sculdascio and Dacomario. A document dated 25 August 1082 (the so-called Carta di Stefano Sculdascio) reveals that the two rectors exercised their duties collectively and enjoyed mutual veto power, much like the Roman consuls. The rectors served a dual role: they were the pope's delegates but, due to their free election, also represented the community.

Upon the death of the first two rectors, Anzone, Dacomario's son, assumed the role of rector by appointment of Pope Urban II. The young rector staged a coup d'état to restore an absolute principality, but the swift intervention of Pope Paschal II thwarted his bold attempt. The pope entrusted the city's governance to Rossemanno, a man of his close confidence and foreign to the Beneventan environment. This decision sparked unrest among the Beneventans, who elected their own rector and sent nearly a hundred nobles to Rome to persuade the pope. The pontiff confirmed Rossemanno, and the city rebelled, attacking a papal representative. The imminent Norman siege (1112) divided Benevento into two factions: the aristocratic one favored defending the city, while the popular faction sought to negotiate with the enemy. The archbishop, Landulf of Gaderisio, aligned with the latter but was unable to perform his pastoral duties in the diocese's municipalities under Norman control. The pope intervened decisively, appointing Landulf Della Greca as rector with extraordinary military and judicial powers. New unrest erupted, and the new rector, gravely injured, was replaced. In 1114, the citizens, led by Bishop Landulf, reached peace with the Normans.

A dark period in Benevento's history began, marked by massacres and revolts, culminating in 1128 when the rector Guglielmo was brutally killed, and his body repeatedly desecrated. For two years, the city governed itself autonomously, resisting papal pressures, but in 1130, Pope Honorius II urged the Normans under Roger II to take the city in his name. The restoration of papal governance was carried out by Antipope Anacletus II in collusion with the Norman king and concluded with a brief period of pacification, followed by a new anti-Norman rebellion. The popular faction prevailed over the aristocrats and aligned with Pope Innocent II, the legitimate pontiff, whom the Beneventans looked to with hope and trust. The pope reciprocated by giving a prominent role to the leader of the popular faction, Rolpotone, who launched a fierce struggle against the aristocrats, who, supported by King Roger, ultimately prevailed, forcing Rolpotone into exile in Naples along with a thousand fellow citizens.

Under the pontificate of Pope Innocent III, the power of the Holy See reached its zenith. This is evident in the city statutes of 1202, in which "theocratic and monocratic inspiration prevailed over popular inspiration." The statutes aimed to consolidate papal power and suppress any democratic movements, ensuring institutions could not be used for anti-papal maneuvers. The use of ornate, refined Latin and the lengthy drafting and approval process, finalized only in 1230 when Pope Gregory IX ratified them, are significant in this regard.

The document begins with a preamble narrating the statutes' origin and necessity. It is followed by various procedural regulations divided into multiple sections. The prima constitutio establishes that all judgments must follow Lombard customs or, in their absence, Roman law. Judges could not decide without consulting the consuls, and any new decision of common interest required approval by the council of notables, which included representatives from the city's districts. Moralistic norms follow: lawyers had to swear to handle cases faithfully and not prolong them maliciously; magistrates were to honor and love the people, and vice versa; judicial and notarial acts had to be drafted in good faith, etc. The first constitutio is signed by 24 jurors and 12 judges. The second constitutio contains constitutional law provisions.

=== From the siege of Frederick II to the Battle of Benevento ===
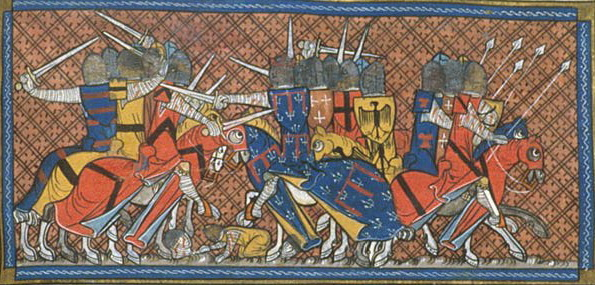
French miniature depicting the Battle of Benevento (British Library, Royal 16 G VI f. 432).

The new pontiff, Pope Gregory IX, ordered the Swabian emperor Frederick II to embark on a crusade to the Holy Land. Due to health reasons, the emperor could not depart. The pontiff, without hearing reasons, excommunicated him on 29 September 1227. Thus began a decade of tension between the Swabians and the Papacy, culminating in 1241 when the city, reduced to starvation, was sacked and destroyed by Frederick II's troops.

This inaugurated a brief period of Swabian domination in Benevento. Civic magistracies were abolished, and royal officials assumed all powers. The citizens, exhausted by the siege, pleaded with the emperor to emigrate elsewhere. The emperor's response was harsh and uncompromising: "Since the city of Benevento is a stumbling block and scandal to our Kingdom, we do not want its inhabitants to leave it, now that they seem more concerned with their safety than with satisfying our majesty. Therefore, we wish that all waste away within it due to the squalor of hunger, until they are compelled, by the severity of starvation and the deprivation of other goods, to obey our commands and mandates without distinction."

Gregory IX's successor, Pope Innocent IV, convened an ecumenical council in 1245, where he excommunicated and deposed Frederick II again. In a letter dated 18 July 1247 to Friar Bonafede, a trusted Franciscan, the pontiff acknowledged the existence of a strong pro-Swabian faction and urged the recipient to investigate cases of treason and absolve repentant pro-Swabian citizens from excommunication. The pro-papal faction secretly gained supporters, but Swabian authorities harshly suppressed a rebellion attempt on 1 January 1250. Frederick II died shortly after, and Innocent attempted to subdue the Kingdom of Sicily by funding Benevento's reconstruction, which had repopulated in the meantime. However, Frederick's son, Conrad IV, retook the kingdom, including Benevento, which had no means of defense. With Conrad's premature death (1254), the Church held the northern part of the kingdom and granted the southern part to Manfred as a papal vicar; but soon, Manfred regained control of all territories.

The new Pope Clement IV reached an agreement with Charles of Anjou: renouncing dominion over southern Italy, only Benevento's return to papal rule was guaranteed, with the reinstatement of the city's rights. Manfred decided to confront Charles of Anjou in battle. The Battle of Benevento took place on 12 February 1266 near the city. Manfred, betrayed by desertions, lost and died. With him fell the imperial Hohenstaufen dynasty. His body was scattered in the Calore River:

[...] The bones of my dead body still would be
At the bridge-head, near unto Benevento,
Under the safeguard of the heavy cairn.

— Dante Alighieri, Purgatorio, Canto III

In this regard, historian Gianni Vergineo notes: "It is the most logical solution, as it is more consistent with the meaning of that battle: not even the preservation of relics is permitted. A tomb can become a temple. And a temple implies a cult. Of Manfred, they want not even a memory to remain, so that no one attempts to follow the same path. The scattering of mortal remains to the rain and wind is thus in the natural order of events. But it is not in the logic of the historical destiny of the fair-haired emperor. The more his persecutors strive to erase every sepulchral relic, the more the light of glory, the sun of the dead, fills that void with an unblemished splendor, making Manfred's figure ever purer and grander. And it is in this light that posterity continues to see him, while his victor appears cloaked in a dark veil of infamy..."

Charles of Anjou allowed his troops to sack the city. For eight days, the army ravaged Benevento with fire and sword, committing murders, robberies, and rapes. A notarial act by Marino de Maurellis records: "Charles's army, intoxicated by victory, cruelly devastated Benevento, sparing neither the elderly, children, nor priests. Thus, the entire city, though submissively subjected to the new king, received no regard: many houses were destroyed, the city walls razed, and virgins publicly violated."

=== From Clement IV's privilege to Eugene IV's statutes ===
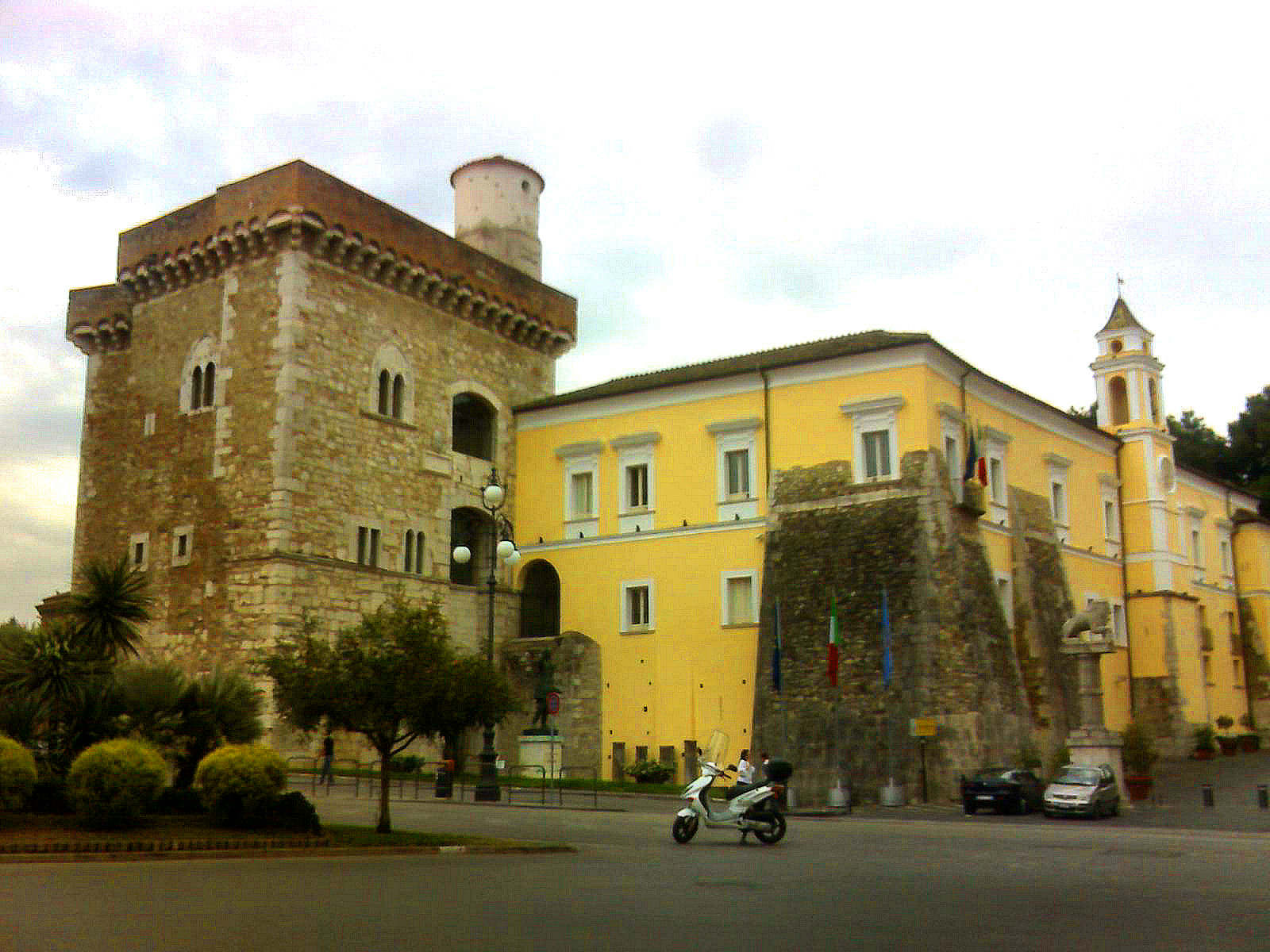
The Rocca dei Rettori was built after a popular revolt in 1316 that devastated the old residence in the Piano di Corte district.

Reconstruction was sponsored by Pope Clement IV, who, on 29 June 1266, issued a privilege promising protection and aid. The document also stated that the King of Sicily would provide the kingdom's forests and all necessary building materials. The pontiff's magnanimous act toward the Beneventans contrasted with the actions of procurators and judges, who suppressed dissent and hunted down those who had supported the Swabians. In 1276 alone, the Inquisition condemned and burned three people. Simone Delli Sorci, an inquisitor of the Order of Saint Dominic, "uprooted the last remnants of Swabian domination."

The 1265 agreement between the Angevin king and the pontiff stipulated that the pope would, in due time, delineate the pre-war boundaries. In practice, these boundaries were not drawn due to conflicts between the two parties, leading to an economic blockade of the duchy (1269). Deprived of essential supplies, the city lived under the threat of famine. Pope Gregory X attempted to address the boundary issue during a meeting with the Angevin king in Benevento in 1271, but to no avail. The dispute subsided with Pope Martin IV, who favored the Angevins and avoided friction. His authoritarian policy led him to abolish the civic ordinance through a papal bull on 9 October 1281. This drastic decision provoked a strong reaction from Benevento's two political factions, forcing Pope Honorius IV to send a delegate to pacify tensions. The underlying issue remained unresolved, and the pontiff decreed that merely mentioning the factions was a crime. Unrest peaked in 1289 when Archbishop Giovanni di Castrocoeli staged a coup, ousting Rector Giovanni Boccadiporco and his collaborators. Castrocoeli established a government composed half of priests and half of laymen, blocked revenues to the Holy See, and reformed the civic administration democratically.

Finally, in 1304, Pope Benedict XI recognized that the arrogance of papal rectors incited popular reactions and granted permission for the election of civic magistrates and the drafting of new statutes, subject to Rome's approval. However, little changed. The rector continued to judge and govern simultaneously, wielding unchecked power. The famine of 1316 was the breaking point: led by Simone Mascambruno, the Beneventans stormed the rector's seat, Ugo de Laysac, overwhelmed the defenses, burned archival documents, and set the building ablaze. Pope John XXII reacted harshly: he excommunicated Simone up to the third generation, had him quartered and beheaded in public before his fellow citizens. The pontiff ordered the construction of a new, more defensible seat for the rectors: the Rocca dei Rettori, replacing the former Piano di Corte residence.

Relations between the Beneventans and the Holy See remained tense. In 1385, some citizens attempted to prevent Pope Urban VI from entering the city. The persistence of conflicts showed that the populace refused to be marginalized, actively participating in assemblies and remaining an obligatory interlocutor. Civic assemblies were held in the Cathedral, attended by all citizens with voting rights: knights, judges, notaries, public merchants, guild leaders, etc. The convocation occurred via the ringing of a specific bell, the Scarana, with the rector and bishop also attending.

Under Pope Eugene IV, the city adopted new statutes, approved between 1431 and 1440. The reason for this generous concession is unclear, possibly linked to the war of succession for the Kingdom of Naples, sparked by the death of Queen Joanna II between the Angevins and the Aragonese. To avoid Beneventan involvement in the conflict, the pontiff granted new concessions. Eugene's civic ordinance was based on a council of twelve councilors, three from each of Benevento's four classes (nobiles, mercatores, artifices or ministeriales, massarii). Meetings were held weekly, with fines for non-attendance or leaving before the session's legal conclusion. Two of the twelve councilors were tasked with judging appeals against public officials' abuses. The rector's presence at council meetings was not mandatory, but no resolution was valid without his approval. The rector, chosen by the pontiff from trusted individuals, could not leave the city without council authorization and, at the end of his term, was subject to scrutiny for his actions. Another figure in the statutes was the castellan, who, besides overseeing the rector's residence security, managed the opening and closing of the city gates, performing these tasks after the ringing of the castle bell in the morning and evening. The city treasurer, elected by voting citizens, held numerous responsibilities: maintaining the inventory of revenues and expenses, overseeing public building maintenance, reviewing tax appeals, paying public officials' salaries, and managing tax contracts. The mayor represented the civic administration during disputes and was responsible for maintaining roads, bridges, and walls.

In Eugene's statutes, women's legal status remained inferior to men's. Women lacked legal capacity and rights; they could not buy, sell, receive, administer, or manage their dowry. The husband represented her in all matters, as the father did before marriage. Conversely, penalties for men were far harsher than for women, ranging from imprisonment to public flogging, banishment, or nose-cutting (the latter for rapists). Women faced mostly monetary fines. An exception was child abandonment: "Any woman who has abandoned or caused her child to be abandoned in a church, hospital, or other place is punished with the penalty for murder. If the child survives, the woman shall be flogged and exposed for an entire day on the steps of the main church." The sanction system aimed to "preserve the family from all possible factors of disintegration." Prostitutes had no legal protection, and their assailants went unpunished. Prostitution was tolerated outside the walls but strictly forbidden within the city. The head of the family could punish family members at his discretion but could not inflict serious injuries. Economic regulations were influenced by Roman law.

=== From the mid-15th century to the mid-17th century ===
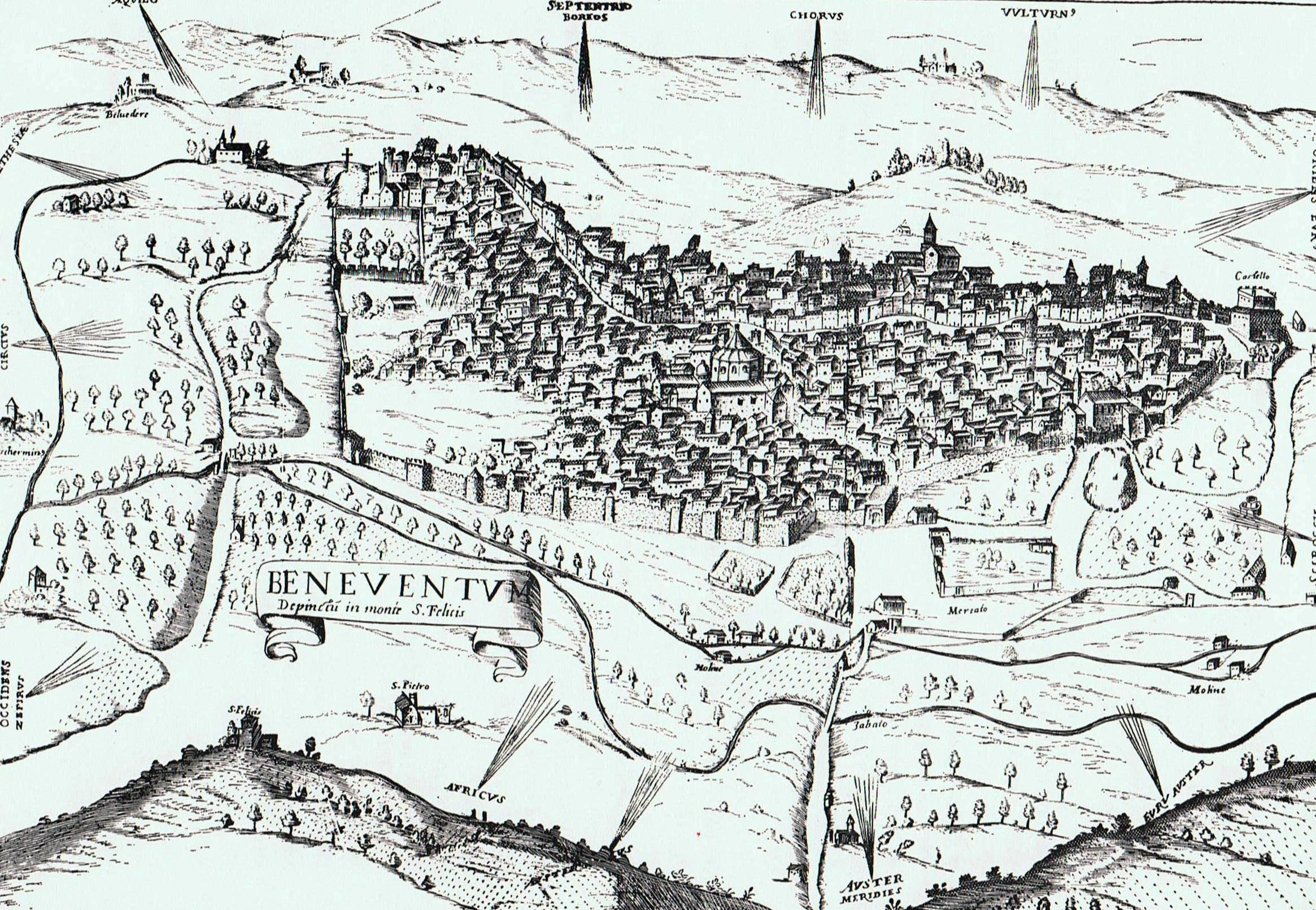
View of Benevento in the 17th century.

In the mid-15th century, Benevento retained its Lombard urban structure. The city was divided into districts named after their respective gates: Somma, Aurea, San Lorenzo, Rufina, Nova, Gloriosa, Foliarola, Biscarda. The most prestigious building was the Basilica of San Bartolomeo, a pilgrimage destination for venerating the saint's relics. The basilica (damaged by earthquakes in June 1688 and March 1702) featured three large domes erected in the 14th century. Economic and commercial activities flourished, though wealth remained concentrated in the hands of monasteries and a few families. Agricultural products came from the surrounding countryside; flour was produced in mills along the two rivers bordering the urban center; and artisanal activities were numerous. The presence of Jews was evidenced by the existence of a ghetto, called the Giudecca. In 1374, Bishop Ugo Guilardi ordered his priests not to use coercion or blackmail to induce Beneventan Jews to baptism.

In the war of succession for the Kingdom of Naples, the papacy remained loyal to the Angevins, but the Aragonese prevailed. On 18 December 1440, Alfonso of Aragon, with the castellan's complicity, seized the city and stationed his general staff there while awaiting the conquest of Naples. In Benevento, he convened his first parliament, where the kingdom's nobles swore allegiance to him and his son Ferdinand of Naples. Pope Eugene IV, abandoned by René of Anjou, sided with the victors and not only crowned Alfonso as king of Naples but also appointed him vicar of Benevento. Upon Alfonso's death (1458), Pope Callixtus III quickly appointed his nephew, Pietro Ludovico Borgia, as rector of Benevento. King Ferdinand responded by occupying the city. After a few months, the two parties reached an agreement: in exchange for investiture to the kingdom, Ferdinand relinquished Benevento to the papal delegate (12 March 1459).

The following years were marked by fierce disputes between pro-papal and anti-papal factions, including murders, revolts, coup attempts, military occupations, and various crimes. On 12 April 1525, Rector Mario De' Marii induced the rival factions to sign a peace agreement, notarized in the Cathedral before the main altar, where representatives of the two parties, Antonio Pesce and Alfonso Colluccella, swore on the consecrated host to renounce all hostilities. Historian Gianni Vergineo comments on this instrument of concord: "Not even Christ is enough to contain the hatred or defuse the sparks of discord. The ground is too heavily mined to be fully reclaimed. Oaths and peace proposals crumble over trivial matters."

A severe blow came in 1528 when the troops of Charles V stayed in Benevento for three months, lodging, eating, and drinking for free, stripping the Beneventans of all resources. With the appointment of Ferrante I Gonzaga as governor, the city entered a period of prosperity and economic growth. Gonzaga and his successors ruled with restraint, granting the civic administration considerable autonomy. This new era of concord and collaboration between papal governors and the populace was robust enough to withstand revolts: when a certain Fracasso, of plebeian origin, entered the city with rebels to occupy it, the Beneventans themselves foiled his attempt and handed him over to the judicial authorities.

Pope Paul III (formerly archbishop of Benevento) granted numerous privileges to the city and tasked the cathedral's archdeacon, along with other arbitrators, with drafting new city statutes, ratified by Pope Sixtus V's papal brief in 1588. The new statutes expanded representation due to significant population growth. The council comprised forty-eight members, nine from each civic class. Elections occurred every two years during the feast of Saint Michael in May. Executive power was entrusted to eight consuls (two per class), elected every four months from council members to ensure rotation. The council appointed public officials: two masters for the Annunziata hospital, twelve captains, the mayor, the treasurer, the fiscal procurator, and ambassadors.

Pope Pius V's decision to expel all Jews from the Papal States, except Rome and Ancona, was enforced in Benevento, forcing all Jewish citizens to abandon the ghetto between Piano di Corte and Porta Somma. On 22 May 1617, the city consuls proposed to the council to petition Pope Paul V for the return of the exiled Jews, deemed useful to the citizenry. The council approved the motion with 27 votes in favor and 5 against, but no archival evidence records the Jews' return.

After the statutes' year (1588), the city continued to grow and prosper until it was struck by the plague of 1656.

=== The Orsini period ===
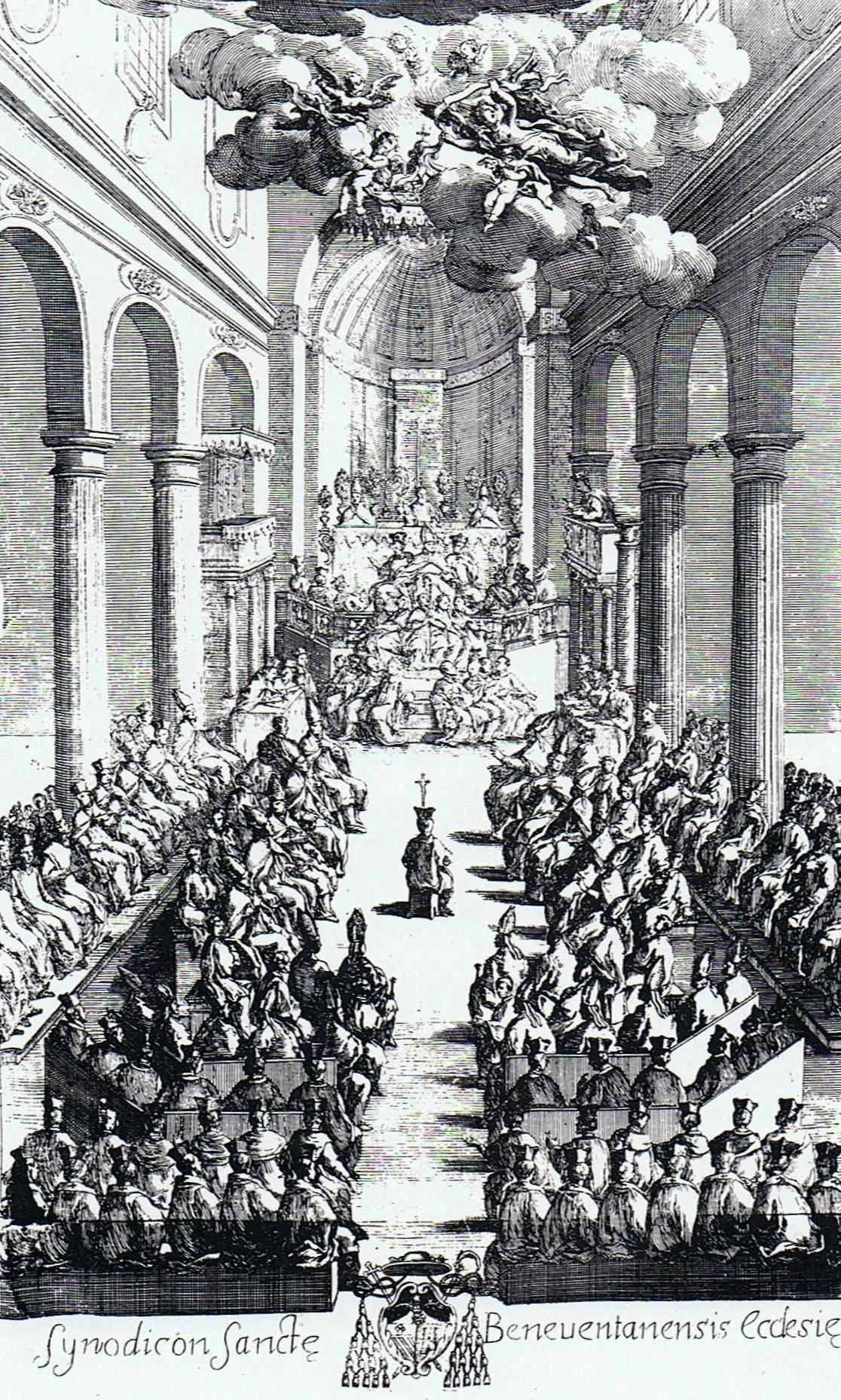
A diocesan synod in the Cathedral of Benevento during the episcopate of Vincenzo Maria Orsini.

In 1686, with the appointment of Vincenzo Maria Orsini (later Pope Benedict XIII) to the diocesan see, Benevento experienced a new period of balance and serenity. Orsini was "sleepless, tireless, irresistible, turning the diocese upside down, awakening the dormant, stimulating the idle, and warming the lukewarm." As a devout Dominican, he rejected baroque pomp and ornate decorations, reforming liturgy, chants, rites, and catechesis. He convened annual diocesan synods to discuss all matters (the last synod before him had been held decades earlier).

Orsini's efforts focused particularly on catechesis. He devised a series of educational precepts on teaching the catechism, reflecting extraordinary zeal but also a rigid, authoritarian mindset. He harshly condemned any practices of magic or superstition, viewing them as deviations from the true faith. He established, reformed, and reorganized hospices, hospitals, and grain banks. The latter aimed to protect peasants from usury, provide loans against pledges, and mitigate the effects of a system where most land belonged to a few wealthy nobles. Between 1705 and 1715, Orsini compiled inventories to document diocesan properties and prevent usurpations. Thanks to these measures, annual revenues rose from 67,051 in 1686 to 135,953 in 1715.

During his episcopate, on 5 June 1688, a devastating earthquake struck the city, killing 1,367 people. The most pressing issue was the removal of bodies, as nearly all churches were destroyed and could not accommodate them. Orsini selected a plot, fenced it, and blessed it for this purpose. Simultaneously, he addressed the homeless crisis and promptly initiated reconstruction, encouraging the Beneventans not to lose heart. Further earthquakes on 8 September 1694 and 14 March 1702 shook Benevento, but the archbishop stayed the course, overseeing all religious construction projects in the city.

Even as pope, Orsini retained the title and dignity of archbishop of Benevento, returning to the city in 1727 and 1729.

=== Councils held in Benevento ===
The first council in the city dates to 1059; the canon Stefano Borgia, author of local monographs, records it as presided over by Pope Nicholas II in the now-extinct church of San Pietro. The council addressed the interests of the San Vincenzo al Volturno abbey (founded by three Beneventan brothers, Paldo, Tato, and Taso), occupied by Abbot Liutfredo.

Other councils include:

- 1061, addressing the rights of certain abbeys;
- 1075, in favor of the Santa Sofia abbey;
- 1087, called by Pope Victor III, to issue an anathema against the antipope Guibert of Ravenna, who took the name Clement III, also excommunicating Hugh of Lyon and Richard, abbot of Marseille, for schism with Guibert; lay investitures were also prohibited;
- 1091, presided over by Urban II, discussing ecclesiastical discipline and renewing the anathema against antipope Guibert;
- 1108, Pope Paschal II condemned lay investitures of benefices, prohibited clerics from wearing lay-style clothing or garments unbecoming of ecclesiastical dignity, and addressed matters concerning the province and the Montecassino abbey;
- 1113, called by Paschal II;
- 1117, Pope Paschal II excommunicated Cardinal Burdino, later Antipope Gregory VIII, for crowning Henry V in Rome;
- 1119, against thieves;
- 1331, condemning simony, as noted in the Synodicon Beneventanum;
- 1374, addressing discipline;
- 1470, concerning morals;
- 1545, on the same topic.

Pope Benedict XIII, in his synodicon published in 1693, lists twenty-one councils.

=== Popes who visited Benevento ===
- Pope John XIII, 7 September 967
- Pope Leo IX, in 1051
- Pope Nicholas II, in 1059
- Pope Gregory VII, in 1073
- Pope Victor III, in 1087
- Pope Urban II, in 1091
- Pope Paschal II, in 1108, 1113, and 1117
- Pope Callixtus II, in 1119
- Pope Honorius II, in 1125, 1128, and 1129
- Pope Innocent II, in 1137 and 1139
- Pope Adrian IV, in 1156
- Pope Alexander III, in 1167
- Pope Benedict XIII, in 1727 and 1729
- Pope Pius IX, in 1849
- Pope Leo XIII, in 1901
- Pope John Paul II, in 1990

== From the Napoleonic era to Italian unification ==
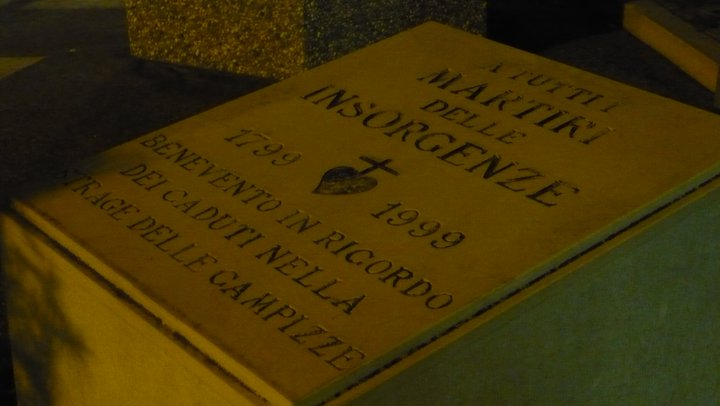
Monument in Benevento dedicated to the insurgents against the Napoleonic invasion of 1799

In 1798, Ferdinand I of the Two Sicilies, King of Naples, concerned by the occupation of Rome by Napoleonic troops, decided to seize Benevento before a pro-French government could emerge, threatening the stability of Bourbon rule. After the operation, he attempted to confront the Roman Republic but was soon forced to surrender; with the Armistice of Sparanise, he relinquished Benevento and Capua to the French.

The French quickly earned popular antipathy by plundering the treasury of the cathedral. The city was governed first by Andrea Valiante, then by Carlo Popp, who declared it annexed to France and introduced post-revolutionary French laws, such as the abolition of nobility and clerical privileges. He also conducted a wave of arrests, spreading terror. Popular discontent erupted in a revolt on 24 May 1799, capitalizing on the arrival of Parthenopean troops: Cardinal Ruffo took control, restoring the city to papal rule.

Despite negotiations between the Holy See and Napoleon, he reoccupied the papal territories (1802). In 1806, he made Benevento an independent principality led by Marquis Talleyrand. Louis de Beer was appointed governor, introducing significant legislative and administrative reforms modeled on those in France. In January 1814, Joachim Murat, King of Naples, occupied the principality and held it until the end of the Napoleonic era.

With the Congress of Vienna (1815), in the session of 4 June, it was established under Article 103 that Benevento be returned to the Holy See, along with the other Napoleonic principality of Pontecorvo. During this period, the castle and the city were garrisoned by Austrian troops (23 May–18 June 1815), and subsequently, the city was governed by the intendant of Avellino, Carlo Ungaro, Duke of Monteiasi, from 11 June to 15 July 1815.

== Contemporary era ==
=== The Risorgimento ===
When news reached Benevento in July 1820 that a revolution had broken out in Naples and the Constitution had been proclaimed, the Carbonari of Benevento rose up, demanding the same guarantees of freedom.

On 3 September 1860, even before Garibaldi reached Naples, a peculiar "revolution" took place, which met no resistance from the papal authorities. The Beneventan Salvatore Giuseppe Rampone, without an escort and dressed in the red shirt of a Garibaldian colonel, went to the castle to inform the last Apostolic Delegate, Odoardo Agnelli, of the order to leave the city within three hours. Papal rule had ended.

=== From 1860 to the present ===
In exchange for incorporation into the Kingdom of Savoy, Salvatore Rampone secured the creation of a dedicated Province for Benevento, which included some territories from the neighboring provinces of the Kingdom of the Two Sicilies (Principato Ultra, Molise, Terra di Lavoro, and to a lesser extent Capitanata).

Due to its central role in railway communications between Rome and Apulia, the city was severely hit by Anglo-American bombings in 1943. On 21 August, the Allies began bombing the city to dislodge the Germans and push them up the peninsula; the first target struck was the railway station.

On 8 September 1943, the armistice of Cassibile was signed, but the city saw no respite: a new Anglo-American bombing targeted the area around the Vanvitelli Bridge. The bombings continued on 11 and 12 September. The 15th was the most tragic day for the city: five waves of bombings completely leveled Piazza Duomo and Piazza Orsini.

Two thousand civilian deaths, the near-total destruction of the industrial area around the railway, 5,000 housing units destroyed, and nearly 4,000 heavily damaged were the results of the air raids. A few weeks later, on 2 October 1943, the Germans left the city. Overall, hundreds died, and 38% of the city's housing units were destroyed. Following the liberation, 17,000 people were displaced, some housed in shacks and others in surrounding towns. For the resilience of its citizens during these difficult circumstances, the city was awarded the Gold Medal for Civil Valor in 1967.

Political life resumed with two main political groups: a liberal one led by Raffaele De Caro and a Christian Democratic one led by Giambattista Bosco Lucarelli. These two groups competed for control of Benevento's administration for several years.

A few years after the war, the devastating flood of the Calore River on 2 October 1949 caused further casualties and destruction.

In the 1950s, the city was governed by mayors from the monarchist right or the Italian Social Movement. Subsequently, the Christian Democrats established dominance, which lasted until the 1990s.

The city's economy, traditionally agricultural, relied heavily on the public sector in the post-war period: numerous jobs in public administration and greater employment opportunities led many residents of the surrounding provincial towns to move to the city.

Urban expansion, at least until the 1970s, was not effectively managed by public authorities; a shift began in the 1980s, but it is in recent years that Benevento has undergone significant transformation. On one hand, the establishment of the university and research centers such as MARSec has spurred development, while on the other, numerous restoration and redevelopment projects in the historic center have made the city more welcoming. However, the flood of 15 October 2015 caused new and severe damage to the entire lower part of Benevento.

The current mayor is Clemente Mastella, elected in June 2016.

== See also ==
- Duchy of Benevento
- Province of Benevento

== Bibliography ==
- AA.VV. (2005). L'Italia: Campania [Italy: Campania]. Milan: Touring Club Italiano.
- Project MURST (2001). Appunti di viaggio: i cinque volti del Sannio [Travel Notes: The Five Faces of Sannio]. Auxiliatrix.
- Falcone, Beneventano (1845). "Chronicon de rebus aetate sua gestis" [Chronicle of Events in His Time]. In G. Del Re, Contemporary Chroniclers and Writers of the Norman Era. Naples.
- Borgia, Stefano (1763). Memorie istoriche della pontificia città di Benevento [Historical Memories of the Pontifical City of Benevento]. Rome.
- De Antonellis, Gianandrea (2008). Storia di Benevento [History of Benevento]. Benevento: Realtà Sannita. ISBN 978-88-7661-5023.
- Paul the Deacon. Historia langobardorum [History of the Lombards].
- Garrucci, Raffaele (1875). Le antiche iscrizioni di Benevento disposte in ordine e dichiarate [The Ancient Inscriptions of Benevento Arranged and Explained]. Benevento.
- Procopius (1974). La guerra gotica [The Gothic War, Translation by F. M. Pontani]. Rome.
- Lonardo, P. (1902). Gli Statuti di Benevento [The Statutes of Benevento]. Benevento: De Martino.
- Rotili, Mario (1958). Benevento e la provincia sannitica [Benevento and the Samnite Province]. Rome.
- Salmon, E. T. (1995). Il Sannio e i Sanniti [Samnium and the Samnites]. Einaudi.
- Torelli, Marina R. (2002). Benevento romana [Roman Benevento]. Rome: L'Erma di Bretschneider. ISBN 9788882652098.
- Vergineo, Gianni (1985). Storia di Benevento e dintorni [History of Benevento and Surroundings]. Benevento: Gennaro Ricolo Editore.
- Zazo, Alfredo (1976). Curiosità storiche beneventane [Historical Curiosities of Benevento]. Benevento.
- Zazo, Alfredo (1973). Dizionario bio-bibliografico del Sannio [Bio-Bibliographic Dictionary of Sannio]. Naples: Fausto Fiorentino Editore.
- Zigarelli, Daniello Maria (1860). Storia di Benevento [History of Benevento]. Naples: Tipografia Lista.
