= John of Naples =

John of Naples may refer to:

== People from Naples ==
- John the Deacon (Neapolitan historian), fl. 9th century
- Giovanni Gaderisi (cardinal), fl. 12th century
- John of Naples (died c. 1350), Dominican theologian
- Giovanni Cataldi (died c. 1465), Dominican theologian
- Giovanni d'Aragona (1456–1485), cardinal

== Dukes of Naples ==
- John of Conza (c. 616)
- John I (711–719)
- John II (c. 915–919)
- John III (928–968/969)
- John IV (997/999–1005)
- John V (1033–1050)
- John VI (1090–1122)

== Bishops of Naples ==
- John I (d. 432)
- John II (6th century)
- John III (7th century)
- John IV (842–849)
- John V (fl. 1033)
- John VI (fl. 1065–1071)
- Giovanni Orsini (1328–1359)
- Giovanni Bozzuto (1407–1415)
