= Sergius =

Sergius or Sergia may refer to:

- Sergius (name), including a list of people with the name, and variants
- Sergia gens, a Roman patrician gens
- Sergia (plant)

== See also ==
- Patriarch Sergius (disambiguation)
- Pope Sergius (disambiguation)
- Saint Sergius (disambiguation)
- Sergius III (disambiguation)
- Sergius of Naples (disambiguation)
- Sergius and Bacchus, 4th century saints
- "Father Sergius", a short story by Leo Tolstoy, and two film adaptations
- Arch of the Sergii, an ancient Roman triumphal arch in Pula, Croatia
