= Sergius of Naples =

Sergius of Naples may refer to

- Sergius I of Naples (died 864)
- Sergius II of Naples, Duke of Naples from 870 to 877
- Sergius III of Naples
- Sergius IV of Naples (died after 1036)
- Sergius V of Naples, son and successor of John V as Duke of Naples from 1042 to 1082
- Sergius VI of Naples (died 1097 or 1107)
- Sergius VII of Naples (died 1137)
