= Romuald II =

Romuald II may refer to:

- Romuald II of Benevento (d. 732), duke of Benevento
- Romuald Guarna (c. 1110–1182), archbishop of Salerno as Romuald II
