= Stephen III =

Stephen III may refer to:

- Pope Stephen II, aka Stephen III, (d. 757), pope of the Roman Catholic Church
- Pope Stephen III (720–772), native of Sicily
- Stephen III of Iberia, Guaramid dynasty, presiding prince of Iberia (Kartli, eastern Georgia) from 779/780 to 788
- Stephen III of Naples (died 832), duke of Naples
- Stephen III of Hungary (1147–1172), King of Hungary and Croatia
- Stefan Dragutin of Serbia, Stephen III of Serbia (died in 1316)
- Stephen III, Duke of Bavaria (1337–1413)
- Stephen III Báthory (died 1444), Hungarian nobleman and commander, Palatine of Hungary
- Stephen III of Moldavia (c. 1433 – 1504), aka Stephen the Great, Prince of Moldavia
