= Gregory II =

Gregory II may refer to:

- Pope Gregory II (715–731)
- Gregory II of Naples (766–794)
- Gregory II, Count of Tusculum (1044–1058)
- Gregory II the Martyrophile (1066–1105)
- Patriarch Gregory II of Constantinople (1283–1289)
- Patriarch Gregory II of Alexandria (1316–1354)
- Gregory II Bulgarian (–1474)
- Gregory II Youssef (1864–1897)
- Joseph Gregorio II (1857–1868)
