= Gisulf II =

Gisulf II may refer to:

- Gisulf II of Friuli, Duke of Friuli (r. c. 591 – c. 611)
- Gisulf II of Benevento (died between 749 and 753)
- Gisulf II of Salerno, last Lombard prince of Salerno (1052–1077)
