= Sergius I =

Sergius I may refer to:

- Sergius of Tella, Patriarch of the Syriac Orthodox Church in 544–546
- Sergius I of Constantinople (died in 638)
- Pope Sergius I (died in 701), Sicilian-born pope
- Sergius I of Naples (died 864)
- Sergius I of Amalfi (died 966)
- Patriarch Sergius I of Moscow (1867–1944)

== See also ==
- Sergius
