= Gregory I =

Gregory I may refer to:

- Gregory the Illuminator (250s–330s), Catholicos of the Armenian Apostolic Church in 288–325
- Gregory of Nazianzus (329–390), Patriarch Gregory I of Constantinople, in office 379–381
- Pope Gregory I (540–604), in office 590–604
- Gregory I of Naples (died 755), r. 740–755
- Gregory I, Patriarch of Bulgaria c. 940 – c. 944
- Gregory I, Count of Tusculum, r. in 954–1012
- Patriarch Gregory I of Alexandria, Greek Orthodox patriarch, in office 1354–1366
- Maputeoa (1814–1857), Gregorio I Maputeoa, King of Mangareva, r. c. 1830–1857
