= Godescalc of Benevento =

8th-century Italian duke

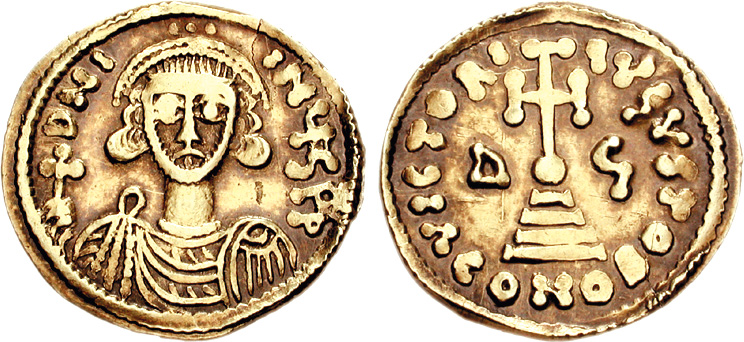
A solidus bearing Godescalc's effigy

Godescalc (also known as Godescalco, Gottschalk, Godescalcus or Gotteschalchus) was the Duke of Benevento in Langobardia minor from 740 until his assassination in 743. Godescalc's accession was without approval of the King.

With the return of Thrasimund II to power in Spoleto, the wrath of Liutprand, King of the Lombards, was brought down upon central and southern Italy. After taking care of Thrasimund, Liutprand turned to Benevento, where Godescalc was preparing to flee. The Duke had already loaded a ship with supplies and, together with his wife, Anna, and the rest of his family, were attempting to flee when the people, faithful to the memory of Romuald II, killed him. Godescalc's wife and family escaped to Greece.

Regnal titles
Preceded by Gregory	Duke of Benevento; 740–743	Succeeded by Gisulf II
