= Anatolius of Naples =

Duke of Naples

Anatolius of Naples (date of birth unknown; died 638) was the third Duke of Naples, reigning from circa 625 until his death in 638.

Preceded by John of Conza	Duke of Naples; 625 – 638	Succeeded by Basil
