= Basil of Naples =

Byzantine soldier

Basil (or Basilio) (Latin: Basilius) was Duke of Naples from 661 to 666. Neapolitan by birth, soldier of the Byzantine Empire by trade, he was nominated by the emperor Constans II to be dux Campaniae in 661.

Preceded by Anatolius	Duke of Naples; 661 – 666	Succeeded by Theophylactus I
