= Stephen II of Naples =

Stephen II (died 799) was the duke of Naples during an important transitional period in its history, from 755 to his death. He was styled as eminentissimus consul and was the leader of the local aristocracy when he was appointed by the patrician of Sicily. By the end of his reign, through a rupture with the Byzantine Empire, Naples was practically independent. After his abdication, Naples experienced a period of crisis until the election of Sergius I in 840.

At the beginning of his reign, Naples was still a loyal dukedom of the Byzantines, her dukes appointed by the emperor. In 761, therefore, she denied entry to the papal envoy, the Bishop Paul, an opponent of the iconoclasm then gripping the Byzantine world. Stephen was no less a supporter of the iconoclasm than the emperor himself. At that time, Stephen addressed Antiochos, the patrician of Sicily and his technical overlord, as "our lord" and "most excellent patrikios and protostrategos" (763). By 764, however, Naples had thrown off iconoclasm and Paul was able to take up his see.

After twelve years of peaceful government, during which he gained much popularity with the people, a plague hit the city of Naples and decimated the citizenry and the clergy, including the bishop himself. The people acclaimed Stephen as bishop. He immediately sought out the pope in Rome and was consecrated. Though he ceased to be duke, he continued to act as bishop for thirty-three years and he transferred the duchy to his son Gregory. He had two other sons, named Caesar, who died in the flower of youth, and Theophylactus.

== Sources ==
- Gay, Jules. L'Italie méridionale et l'empire Byzantin: Livre I. Burt Franklin: New York, 1904.
- Chalandon, Ferdinand. Histoire de la domination normande en Italie et en Sicilie. Paris, 1907.

Preceded by Gregory I	Duke of Naples; 755–766	Succeeded by Gregory II
