= Terra Sancti Benedicti =

Montecassino Abbey lands

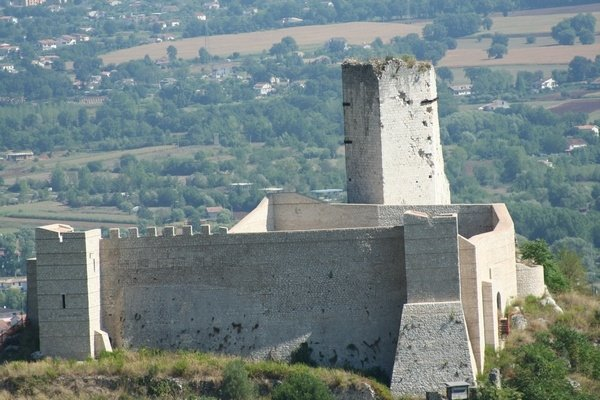
Rocca Janula, Cassino

The Terra Sancti Benedicti ("Land of Saint Benedict") was the secular territory, or seignory, of the powerful Abbey of Montecassino, the chief monastery of the Mezzogiorno and one of the first Western monasteries: founded by Benedict of Nursia himself, hence the name of its possessions. It lasted from the 8th to the 19th century.

The "Terra Sancti Benedicti" was part of larger states, according to the historical succession, from the Duchy of Benevento to the Kingdom of the Two Sicilies. Despite the wide autonomy it enjoyed in some periods, it was never, neither de jure nor de facto, an independent state, as were the Italian city-states of Northern and Central Italy. The nature of the dominion of the Abbey of Montecassino has sometimes been improperly assimilated to these Italian states. The "Terra Sancti Benedicti" is therefore an integral part of the Terra di Lavoro and has always followed its political vicissitudes.

== History ==
The foundation of the Terra Sancti Benedicti can be traced back to the large donation of land made in 744 to the monastery by the Gisulf II of Benevento. The donation was probably of both a religious and political nature: thus an alliance between the Church and the Duchy of Benevento was guaranteed to defend each other. In the following centuries, monasteries, churches and castles with annexed possessions were gradually offered to the monastery, even overseas, through concessions and donations made by nobles, emperors and popes, reaching eighty thousand hectares.

The history of the territories linked to the Benedictine Abbey can be divided into three main phases which correspond to three different approaches to the control of the territory: first the age of the Manorialism, then that of the "castrum" and finally that of the development of the "universitas civium". Subsequently, the Abbey progressively loses its historical temporal power.

After these phases of development, the loss of power by Montecassino and the fading of the territory it had controlled into larger organisms began with alternating events. An earthquake destroyed the Abbey in 1349 and, although it soon returned to its function, the event can be considered an important watershed. In the 14th century, the Papal States tried to limit the abbey ecclesiastical jurisdiction placing a bishop at San Germano, but the abbots managed to maintain many prerogatives thanks to Pope Urban V.

The official end of the feudal lordship came in 1806 with the abolition of feudal rights in the Kingdom of Naples sanctioned by the so-called "laws of subversion of feudality".

With the loss of temporal power, the jurisdiction of the abbey over the surrounding territory remained only ecclesiastical, as a territorial abbey: the abbots were equated in their functions with diocesan bishops, even if in most cases they were not awarded the episcopal character.

== Sources ==
- The papacy and the Terra Sancti Benedicti.
