= Theodore I of Naples =

Duke of Naples from 719 to 729

Theodore I (died 729) was the Duke of Naples for a decade beginning in 719. He was titled "hypatos and doux".

During his tenure, he founded a church dedicated to saints John and Paul.

== Sources ==
- Gay, Jules. L'Italie méridionale et l'empire Byzantin: Livre I. Burt Franklin: New York, 1904.

Preceded by John I	Duke of Naples; 719–729	Succeeded by George
