= Scauniperga =

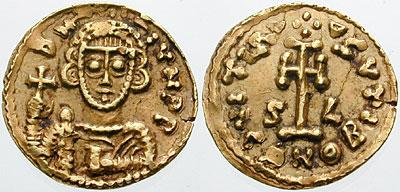
A tremissis of Liutprand, from the regency of Scauniperga.

Scauniperga (fl. 756), was a duchess of Benevento. She was the mother of Liutprand of Benevento, and reigned by his side from 751 to 756.

Scauniperga was married to Gisulf II, and became the head of the regency and regent of Benevento when her underage son succeeded to the Duchy in 751. During the regency, she had herself listed first in official documents and referred to as dux (Duke), the same title as that of her son. She supported King Aistulf by recognizing his authority and thus confirmed the duchy as a royal vassal state to the kingdom.

== Sources ==
- Chris Wickham: The Inheritance of Rome: A History of Europe from 400 to 1000
