= Duke of Naples =

Historical Italian military commanders

The dukes of Naples were the military commanders of the ducatus Neapolitanus, a Byzantine outpost in Italy, one of the few remaining after the conquest of the Lombards. In 661, Emperor Constans II, highly interested in south Italian affairs (he established his court in Syracuse), appointed a Neapolitan named Basil dux or magister militum. Thereafter a line of dukes, often largely independent and dynastic from the mid-ninth century, ruled until the coming of the Normans, a new menace they could not weather. The thirty-ninth and last duke, Sergius VII, surrendered his city to King Roger II of Sicily in 1137.

== Dukes appointed by Byzantium ==
- c. 600 Gudeliscus, as duke of Campania (dux Campaniae)
- c. 603 Guduin, first recorded duke of Naples
  - c. 616 seized by the rebel John of Conza
- c. 625–38 Anatolius
- 661–666 Basil
- 666–670 Theophylactus I
- 670–673 Cosmas
- 673–677 Andrew I
- 677–684 Caesarius I
- 684–687 Stephen I
- 687–696 Bonellus
- 696–706 Theodosius
- 706–711 Caesarius II
- 711–719 John I
- 719–729 Theodore I
- 729–739 George
- 739–755 Gregory I
- 755–766 Stephen II
- 767–794 Gregory II
- 794–801 Theophylactus II
- 801–c. 818 Anthimus
- c. 818–821 Theoctistus
- 821 Theodore II
- 821–832 Stephen III
- 832–834 Bonus
- 834 Leo
- 834–840 Andrew II
- 840 Contardus

== Hereditary dukes ==
These dukes were more independent than their predecessors and they were not chosen by the emperor, but the descendants of Sergius I, who was elected by the citizens.

A family tree of dukes of Naples

=== Sergian dynasty (Sergii) ===
- 840–864/865 Sergius I
- 864/865–870 Gregory III
- 870–877/878 Sergius II
- 877/878–898 Athanasius
- 898–c. 915 Gregory IV
- c. 915–919 John II
- 919–928 Marinus I
- 928–968/969 John III
- 968/969–992/997 Marinus II
- 992–997/999 Sergius III
- 997/999–1005 John IV
- 1005–1038 Sergius IV, co-ruling with his son (below) after 1033
  - 1027–1029 under control of Pandulf IV of Capua
- 1033–1050 John V, co-ruling with his father (above) before 1038 and with his son (below) after
- 1038–1076 Sergius V, co-ruling with his father (above) until 1050
- 1077–1107 Sergius VI, co-ruling with his son (below) after 1090
- 1090–1122 John VI, co-ruling with his father (above) until 1107
- 1122–1137 Sergius VII
  - 1137–1139 vacant

In 1139, Naples capitulated to the Normans and shortly after elected a Norman ruler from the ruling dynasty.

=== House of Hauteville ===
- 1139–1144 Alfonso
- 1144–1154 William

In 1154, William succeeded to the Sicilian crown and the line of dukes ends.

== Neapolitan Republic ==
During the Neapolitan Revolt of 1647, the Neapolitan Republic was founded led by a doge.

- 1647–1648 Henri
