= Saint Sergius (disambiguation) =

Saint Sergius was a 3rd-century Roman soldier venerated as a Christian saint and martyr, almost always paired with Saint Bacchus as Saints Sergius and Bacchus.

Saint Sergius may also refer to:

- Sergius of Cappadocia (died 304), Cappadocian monk and martyr
- Saint Sarkis the Warrior (4th century), the Armenian form of Sergius; it is unclear if he should be identified with Saint Sergius
- Pope Sergius I (died 701), pope and saint
- Sergios Niketiates (died 843), Eastern Orthodox saint venerated for his role in the restoration of the veneration of icons
- Sergius of Valaam (10th century), Greek monastic
- Sergius of Samarkand (fl. at least prior to the conversion of Keraites around 1007), Church of the East saint
- Sergius of Radonezh (1314–1392), Russian spiritual leader and monastic reformer
- St. Sergius Orthodox Theological Institute in Paris

== See also ==
- Little Hagia Sophia, the Church of Saints Sergius and Bacchus
- Sergius (disambiguation)
- Maalouf
