= Anthimus of Naples =

Duke of Naples

Anthimus or Anthemus was the Duke of Naples for from 801 until around 818, when the patrician of Sicily re-established Byzantine control over the ducatus. Anthimus was, for most of his reign, independent of any higher authority, but he was losing control over his own subject cities, Gaeta and Amalfi.

Early in his reign, the patrician of Sicily requested his aid in fending off the Saracen pirates then ravaging the Sicilian coasts. Anthimus maintained his neutrality and refused. In 812, the Greek admiral sent to combat these corsairs requested aid from all the inhabitants of the Tyrrhenian coast, including those of Gaeta and Amalfi, who accepted, while Naples refused still. Thus, Naples subjects had declared their independence from her even as Naples was extracting itself from Byzantine suzerainty.

== Sources ==
- Gay, Jules. L'Italie méridionale et l'empire Byzantin: Livre I. Burt Franklin: New York, 1904.

Preceded by Theophylactus II	Duke of Naples; 801 – c.818	Succeeded by Theoctistus
