= George of Naples =

George (died 739) was the Duke of Naples for a decade beginning in 729.

George succeeded Theodore I and continued his prudent policy of balancing between the Byzantine Empire and the papacy, at that time embroiled in a conflict over the iconoclastic controversy. He was succeeded by Gregory I.

An ancient monument dedicated to George can be found at Terracina.

== Sources ==
- Gay, Jules. L'Italie méridionale et l'empire Byzantin: Livre I. Burt Franklin: New York, 1904.

| Preceded by Theodore I | Duke of Naples; 729–739 | Succeeded by Gregory I |
