= Theoctistus of Naples =

Theoctistus
- Teoctisto

Duke of Naples
- In office c. 818 – 821
- Preceded by: Anthimus
- Succeeded by: Theodore II

Personal details
- Born: Unknown
- Died: Unknown
- Profession: Military leader

Theoctistus (Italian: Teoctisto) was the Duke of Naples during an ill-recorded period in its history. His reign began sometime around 818 and lasted until 821.

On the death of Anthimus, a war of succession broke out in Naples on account of the number of pretenders to the ducal throne. Anthimus had not given his consent to the nobility to elect his successor and so Naples was left without a de jure duke on his death. The populace, seeing the uncertainty of the aristocracy, in a coup d'état, invaded the Praetorium with the support of the upper strata of the military hierarchy, and constrained their rulers to send a delegation to Sicily to solicit a new duke from the patrician there, who had authority over the Ducatus Neapolitanus.

With the appointment of Theoctistus to the vacant post, Naples was once again brought under Byzantine influence. Theoctistus was a military man at heart and he opened up a period of wars for the duchy. Nevertheless, he was replaced by another duke from Sicily, Theodore II, who arrived in Naples in 821.

== Sources ==
- Schipa, Michelangelo. Storia del Ducato Napolitano. Napoli, 1895.
- Cassandro, Giovanni. Il Ducato bizantino in Storia di Napoli Vol I. Napoli, 1975.

| Preceded by Anthimus | Duke of Naples circa 818 – 821 | Succeeded by Theodore II |
