= Gregory I of Naples =

Duke of Naples

Gregory I (died 755) was the Duke of Naples from 740. He also bore the title hypatus.

Preceded by George	Duke of Naples; 740–755	Succeeded by Stephen II
