= John VI of Naples =

John VI (died 1120 or 1123) was the Duke of Naples from 1097 or 1107 to his death. He was the son and successor of Sergius VI. His reign is very obscure on the basis of slight documentary evidence. He followed his father's policy of close relations with Byzantium in light of Norman attacks, and was at some point granted the Byzantine title of protosebastos. He married Eva (or Anna), daughter of Geoffrey Ridell. Through her he was the father of the last duke of Naples, Sergius VII.

Preceded by Sergius VI	Duke of Naples; 1097/1107 – 1120/1123	Succeeded by Sergius VII
