= Audelais of Benevento =

Audelais (also Adelais or Andelais) was an usurper of the duchy of Benevento for two years after the death of Romuald II. He overthrew Romuald's son and heir, Gisulf II. Liutprand, King of the Lombards, came down and removed both Gisulf and Audelais and placed his own candidate, Gregory, on the throne.

== Sources ==
- Notes of the Historia Langobardorum at Northvegr.

Regnal titles
Preceded by Romuald II	Duke of Benevento; 732–733	Succeeded by Gregory
