= Gregory of Benevento =

8th-century Lombard duke

Solidus of Gregory
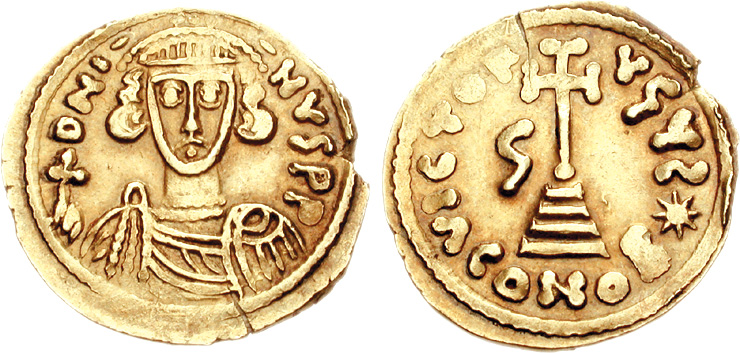
First side of the image: D N I– –NVS P P, crowned and draped facing bust, holding globus cruciger
Second side of the image: VICTOR VGYS (S retrograde) (star), cross potent on three steps; G in left field; in exergue CONOB.
AV solidus, 4,02 g

Gregory (died 739/740) was a nephew of King Liutprand of the Lombards, who appointed him Duke of Benevento in 733 or thereabouts after removing both the usurper Audelais and the minor Gisulf II. He governed the "people of the Samnites," as Paul the Deacon calls the Beneventans, for seven years.

He was married to Giselperga.

== Sources ==
- Paul the Deacon. Historia Langobardorum. Available at Northvegr.

== Notes ==
Regnal titles
| Preceded by Audelais | Duke of Benevento; 733–740 | Succeeded by Godescalc |
