= Rocca dei Rettori =

Coordinates: 41.1292°N 14.7825°E

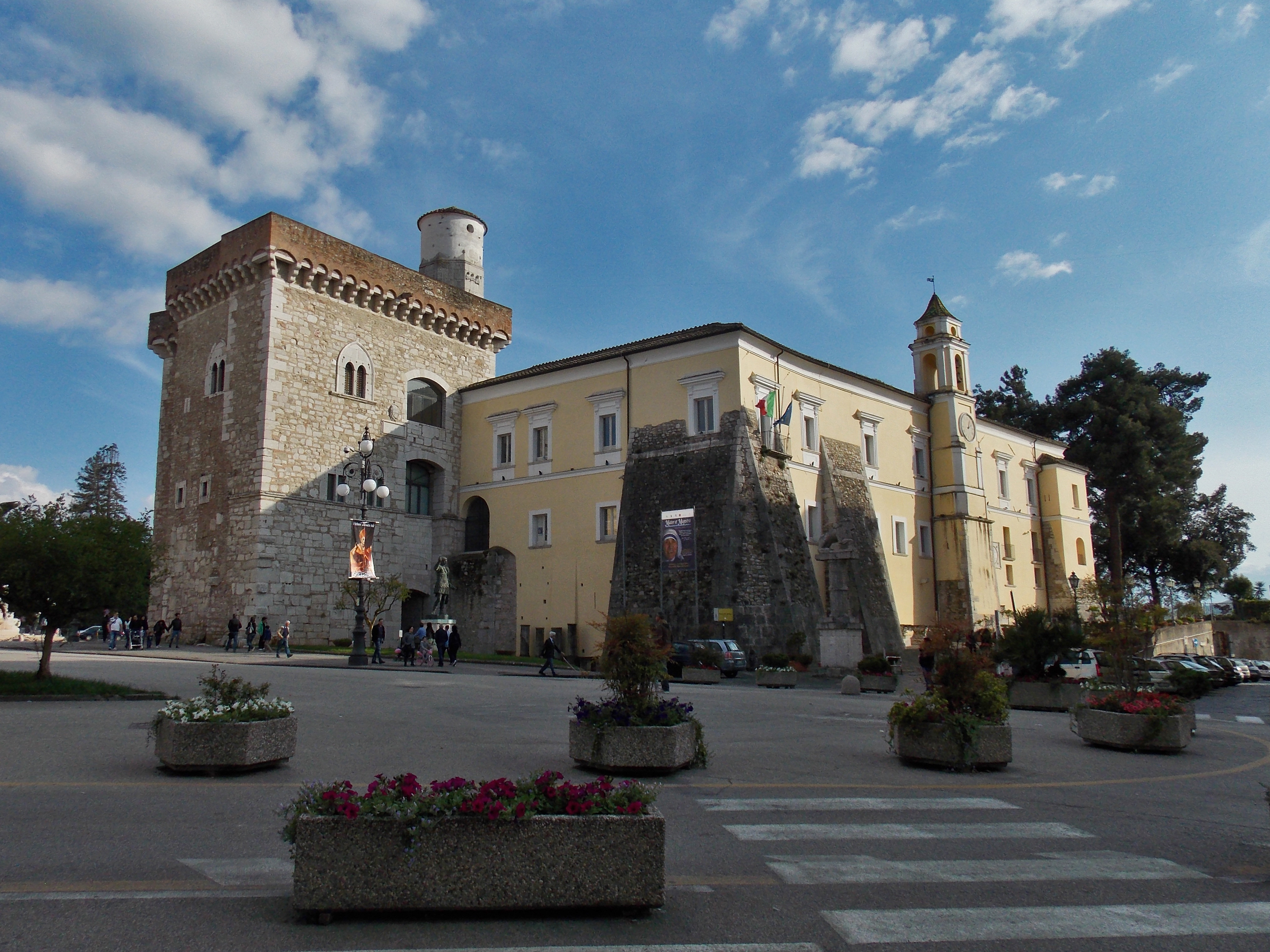
Rocca dei Rettori seen from North, with the Torrione ("Big Tower") on the right.

Rocca dei Rettori (also known as Castle of Manfredi) is a castle in Benevento, southern Italy. It currently houses the Museum of the Samnium.

== History ==
Archaeological excavations held during the 1998 restoration have proven that the area was used since prehistoric times: findings include a necropolis from the (7th-6th century BC), surmounted by Samnite tombs. The Samnites built here a rampart around the 4th century BC, and were the first to use the place as a defensive position. The Romans built here a bath building, known as Castellum aquae, carrying the water through an aqueduct from the Serino river.

The Lombards re-used defensive the location, and raised the eastern wall. In the 8th century, a Benedictine monastery was erected here. Starting from 771, during the rule of Duke Arechis II of Benevento, the monastery was united to a castle or fortified palace (Castrum vetus), which was enlarged around the 11th century. Subsequently, the edifice lived a period of semi-abandonment. In 1321 Pope John XXII asked the governor of the city, William of Balaeto, to restore the building as a residence for the papal rectors. The nuns were transferred to the monastery of San Pietro.

In the 16th century, the Rocca was enlarged. From 1586 it was increasingly used as a jail, which was active until 1865. After the 1702 earthquake, the edifice was partially rebuilt under design by Carlo Buratti.

== Description ==
The Rocca is located in the highest point of the historical center of Benevento. The current appearance is the result of numerous renovations and additions along the centuries. It is composed of two main bodies: the Big Tower (Torrione), built by the Lombards, is the only visible remain of their original fortress, although it has been restored several times, until in the 15th century it obtained the current appearance (and is thus known as Castrum novum, "New Castle").

The Torrione has an elevation of 28 meters. The walls include fragments of Roman edifices (especially in the eastern side) and has ogival double mullioned windows. The terrace has two turrets.

The other main body of the fortress is the Palazzo dei Governatori Pontifici ("Palace of the Papal Rectors", or governors. This edifice has the main entrance on the eastern side, with a staircase leading to a rear garden which is at an upper level than the nearby road. The Palace has a rectangular plane, with three floors and an inner court. It includes both ancient (the barbicans) and modern (the framed windows and the colonnade) elements. The lowest floor is occupied by the cells, with a large staircase leading to the upper floor. This has large halls with wooden ceilings and decorations (often floral ones) from the 18th century.

The rear garden has trees and ends southwards with an overhang. It houses a collection of slabs from the ancient Via Traiana and other Roman architectural fragments. In front of the entrance staircase is a Lion monument, built in 1640 in honor of Pope Urban VIII. The lion is a medieval sculpture, while the octagonal pedestal re-uses richly decorated Roman elements.

== Sources ==
- Rotili, Mario (1967). Il Museo del Sannio. Rome.
