= Sergius III =

Sergius III may refer to:

- Pope Sergius III (reigned 897 and 911), Italian-born pope
- Sergius III of Naples, duke in the 990s
- Sergius III of Amalfi, duke in 1031–1073
