= Gregory II of Naples =

Gregory II was the Duke of Naples from 766 to his death in 794.

He was the eldest son of Stephen II, who augmented his power against his Byzantine suzerains and then abdicated to a monastery, leaving Naples to his son. Stephen had unified the civil, military, and religious authority in the hands of the duke and this unified governing structure he handed down to his son, who gratefully maintained it.

Gregory was succeeded by another descendant of Stephen, Theophylactus II of Naples.

== Sources ==
- Schipa, Michelangelo. Storia del Ducato Napolitano. Napoli, 1895.
- Cassandro, Giovanni. Il Ducato bizantino in Storia di Napoli Vol I. Napoli, 1975.

Preceded by Stephen II	Duke of Naples; 766–794	Succeeded by Theophylactus II
