= Sergius IV of Naples =

Italy in the time of Sergius IV.

Sergius IV (died after 1036) was Duke of Naples from 1002 to 1036. He was one of the prime catalysts in the growth of Norman power in the Mezzogiorno in the first half of the eleventh century. He was nominally a Byzantine vassal, like his father, John IV, before him.

In 1024, he submitted to Pilgrim, Archbishop of Cologne, when the latter was besieging Capua on behalf of Emperor Henry II, though his own duchy was not threatened. By this he acquired a reputation for weakness in the eyes of Prince Pandulf IV of Capua, who had been defeated by Pilgrim. In 1026, Pandulf, returned from captivity, besieged his old capital, now ruled by Pandulf V, the count of Teano. Basil Boioannes, the Greek catapan of Italy, negotiated a surrender and gave Pandulf V safe conduct to Naples, where Sergius offered him asylum. By this, Sergius incurred Pandulf IV's enmity. In the next year (1027), after Sergius' ally Boioannes was recalled, Pandulf attacked Naples and quickly captured it, some say by treachery. Pandulf V fled to Rome and Sergius went into hiding.

For Sergius, however, fortune reversed itself when Pandulf IV was abandoned by his Norman ally, Rainulf Drengot in 1029. Sergius and the Duke of Gaeta, his nephew, John V, sent an embassy to the Norman to ask his assistance in regaining the Neapolitan duchy. With Rainulf's help, Pandulf IV was chased from Naples and Sergius reinstated. Early in 1030, Sergius gave Rainulf the county of Aversa as a fief, the first Norman principality in the region. Sergius also gave his sister in marriage to the new count.

In 1034, Pandulf IV instigated a revolt in Sorrento and annexed it to Capua. In the same year, Sergius' sister died and Rainulf returned to Pandulf's side. Broken in spirit, Sergius retired to the monastery of the Holy Saviour in insula maris, where the Castello del'Ovo now stands. He was succeeded by his son, John V. When John went to Constantinople seeking aid from the Byzantines, Sergius briefly came out of retirement to act as regent. On John's return, Sergius returned to his monastery, where he was still living as late as June 1036. He probably died shortly thereafter. His two retirements explain Amatus of Montecassino's reference to him twice becoming a monk.

| Preceded by John IV | Duke of Naples; 1002–1036 | Succeeded by John V |
