= Sergius VI of Naples =

Sergius VI (died 1107) was the magister militum and duke of Naples from 1077 to his death. He was the son of the Neapolitan senator John, and succeeded his uncle, John's elder brother, Sergius V. His sister Inmilgia married Duke Landulf of Gaeta. His reign is very obscure because of the slight documentary evidence.

In the face of the Norman conquests, Sergius reinforced the Neapolitan relationship with the Byzantine Empire and was at some point granted the Byzantine title of protosebastos. He apparently gave aid to the Norman prince Jordan I of Capua when the latter broke his alliance with Pope Gregory VII and did homage for his principality to the Holy Roman Emperor Henry IV. The pope wrote to Prince Gisulf II of Salerno asking him to persuade Sergius to break off his support for Jordan and Henry.

Around 1078, Sergius married Limpiasa, a daughter of Prince Richard I of Capua and Fressenda, daughter of Tancred of Hauteville. He was succeeded by their son, John VI, whom he had made co-ruler in 1090.

Preceded by Sergius V	Duke of Naples; 1077 – 1107	Succeeded by John VI
