= Stephen III of Naples =

Stephen III (died 832) was the duke of Naples during an important transitional period in its history, from 821 to his death. By the end of his reign, Naples was completely independent.

The duchy was not yet hereditary in 818, when the Byzantine patrician of Sicily appointed a duke without imperial approval. He repeated this in 821, but this latter duke was chased from the city in favour of the elected Stephen III. Stephen was the first to begin striking monies with his own initials on them and not those of the Byzantine Emperor. He was not attached to the empire in any way: neither by appointment nor by any other ties except heritage of his dukedom.

== Sources ==
- Chalandon, Ferdinand. Histoire de la domination normande en Italie et en Sicilie. Paris, 1907.
- Naples in the Dark Ages by David Taylor and Jeff Matthews.

Preceded by Theodore II	Duke of Naples; 821–832	Succeeded by Bonus
