= John I of Naples =

John I was the duke of Naples from September 711 to his death, probably in 719. The main source for his reign is the Chronicon ducum et principum Beneventi, Salerni, et Capuae et ducum Neapolis.

In 716, while a pestilence swept through Naples, Romuald II of Benevento occupied the castle of Cumae. Immediately, Pope Gregory II ordered him to return it and offered compensation if he would. He did not and John led an army against him in 717. As promised, the pope himself contributed 70 pounds of gold to the undertaking.

== Sources ==
- Caravale, Mario (ed). Dizionario Biografico degli Italiani: LV Ginammi – Giovanni da Crema. Rome, 2000.

Preceded by Caesarius II	Duke of Naples; 711–719	Succeeded by Theodore I
