= Liutprand of Benevento =

8th-century Italian duke

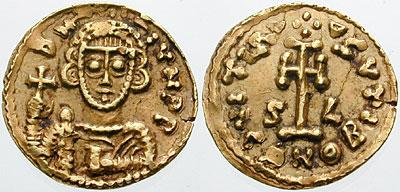
A tremissis of Liutprand, from the regency of Scauniperga

Liutprand (died after 759) was the duke of Benevento from the death of his father Gisulf II in 749 until his own deposition. He reigned under the regency of his mother, Scauniperga, who supported King Aistulf, until 756.

After he attained his majority, he commended his duchy to Pepin the Short, King of the Franks, probably at the coaxing of Pope Stephen II, and rebelled against King Desiderius, being deposed in 758 to be replaced by Arechis II. The Roman Emperor Constantine V offered to capture the fleeing Liutprand if Desiderius would attack the papacy until a Roman force from Sicily could join him. Desiderius did not attack and Liutprand was not captured.

== Sources ==
- Lexikon des Mittelalters: Liutprand Herzog von Benevent (749-759).

Regnal titles
Preceded by Gisulf II	Duke of Benevento; 749 – 758	Succeeded by Arechis II
