= Patriarch Sergius =

Patriarch Sergius may refer to:

== Eastern Orthodox patriarchs ==
- Sergius of Bulgaria, Patriarch of Bulgaria c. 931 – c. 940
- Patriarch Sergius I of Constantinople, Patriarch 610–638
- Patriarch Sergius II of Constantinople, Patriarch 1001–1019
- Patriarch Sergius I of Moscow, Patriarch 1943–1944

== Other patriarchs ==
- Sergius of Tella, Syriac Orthodox Patriarch of Antioch 544–546

== Fictional patriarchs ==
- Patriarch Sergius XVII, a character in Xenosaga
