= John V of Naples =

Duke of Naples 1034 to 1053

John V (died 1042/1053) was the son and successor of Sergius IV as Duke of Naples from 1034 until his death. He accepted to be a vassal of Guaimar IV of Salerno in 1041.

In 1034, Pandulf IV of Capua instigated a revolt in Sorrento and annexed it to Capua. In the same year, Sergius IV's sister died and her husband, Rainulf Drengot, returned to Pandulf's allegiance. At this time, Sergius retired to the monastery of the Holy Saviour in insula maris, where the Castello del'Ovo now stands. He was succeeded by his son John V, who allied with Guaimar IV of Salerno, another enemy of Pandulf's. John was sent by Guaimar to Constantinople to beseech the aid of the Byzantine Emperor. During his absence, Sergius briefly came out of retirement to act as regent. Ultimately the emperor ignored his pleas. Sergius was back in his monastery by June 1036.

John did homage to Guaimar IV -as a vassal- and remained faithful to him throughout his reign. In 1038 he founded a church a Naples dedicated to Saint Simeon, although its location is unclear.

== Sources ==
- Chalandon, Ferdinand. Histoire de la domination normande en Italie et en Sicilie. Paris, 1907.

Preceded by Sergius IV	Duke of Naples; 1036–1042	Succeeded by Sergius V
