= Sergius V of Naples =

Duke of Naples

Sergius V was the son and successor of John V as Duke of Naples from 1042 to 1082.

In the summer of 1074, hostilities flared up between Richard I of Capua and Robert Guiscard. Sergius allied with the latter and made his city a supply centre for Guiscard's troops. This pitted him against Aversa and Capua, while Richard I was supported by the Pope. Sergius soon opened negotiations with Pope Gregory VII, as he had barely escaped destruction in June. These negotiations were concurrent with those of the two Norman princes, mediated by the abbey of Montecassino.

== Sources ==
- Chalandon, Ferdinand. Histoire de la domination normande en Italie et en Sicilie. Paris, 1907.

Preceded by John V	Duke of Naples; 1042–1082	Succeeded by Sergius VI
