= Gisulf II of Benevento =

8th-century Italian duke

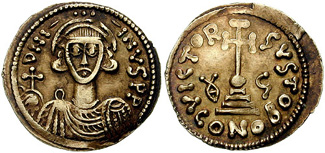
A solidus minted by Gisulf in the name of Justinian II

Gisulf II (died between 749 and 753) was the third last duke of Benevento before the fall of the Lombard kingdom. He ruled from 743, when King Liutprand came down and removed Godescalc, to his death up to ten years later.

== Life ==
Gisulf was the son of Romuald II of Benevento and Gumperga, daughter of Aurona, sister of Liutprand. As a relative of the king, he was supported by the royal power, but being a minor on his father's death, one Audelais managed to usurp the duchy. Liutprand removed Audelais and, placing another nephew, Gregory, on the throne, brought Gisulf back to be raised in the royal palace at Pavia.

In 744, Gisulf made a donation of land to the Abbey of Montecassino which would become the basis for the Terra Sancti Benedicti.

The Beneventans (or Samnites) remained faithful to Gisulf and his father's dynasty, however, and when, after Gregory's death, Godescalc usurped the ducal throne, the people rose up and murdered him, allowing Liutprand to place the now-adult Gisulf in power. According to Hartmann , Gisulf followed the policies of Liutprand faithfully.

He was married to Scauniperga.

== Sources ==
- Lexikon des Mittelalters: Gisulf II. Herzog von Benevent (741-749).
- Paul the Deacon. Historia Langobardorum. Available at Northvegr.

== Notes ==
Regnal titles
Preceded by Godescalc	Duke of Benevento; 743–749	Succeeded by Liutprand
