= Romuald II of Benevento =

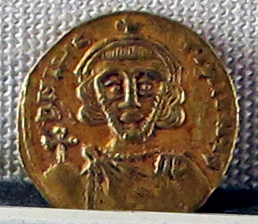
Romuald II of Benevento

Romuald II the Younger (died 732) was the son of Gisulf I and Winiperga. He succeeded as duke of Benevento on the death of his father, which is dated variously as 698, 706, or 707. According to Paul the Deacon, Gisulf reigned 17 years, which would imply his death in 698, but Paul also mentions acts which seem certainly to have occurred around 705. He gives Romuald a reign of 26 years, which puts his death in either 724, 731, or 732.

Romuald conflicted with both the Duchy of Spoleto and the Duchy of Naples during his long reign. Conflict with the latter brought him into conflict with the Papacy as well. He took the outlying castle of Cumae from John I of Naples in 716 and ignored Pope Gregory II's pleas and offers of compensation for restitution. In 717, the pope funded an expedition of John's which decisively defeated his gastald's army and displaced his men from Cuma.

Romuald was married twice: firstly to Guntberga (or Gumperga), daughter of King Liutprand's sister Aurona, and secondly to Ranigunda, daughter of Duke Gaiduald of Brescia. He was succeeded by his son by Gumperga, Gisulf II, but he was a minor and was removed by the usurper Adelais, though his life was spared.

== Sources ==
- Lexikon des Mittelalters: Romuald II. Herzog von Benevent (698-724).
- Paul the Deacon. Historia Langobardorum. Available at Northvegr.

== Notes ==
Regnal titles
Preceded by Gisulf I	Duke of Benevento; 706–732	Succeeded by Adelais
