= Manso =

Manso may refer to:

== Places ==
- Bono Manso, the capital of Bonoman in Ghana
- Manso, Haute-Corse, France
- Manso, Ghana

== People ==
- Manso (surname)
- Manso Indians, an indigenous American people

=== Given name ===
- Manso, Prefect of Amalfi (fl. 898–914), Italian noble
- Manso I of Amalfi (died 1004), Italian noble
- Manso II of Amalfi (fl. 1028–1052), Italian noble
- Manso (viceduke) (fl. 1077–1096), Italian noble

== See also ==
- Manso River (disambiguation)
