= 1038 =

1038 in various calendars
- Gregorian calendar: 1038; MXXXVIII
- Ab urbe condita: 1791
- Armenian calendar: 487; ԹՎ ՆՁԷ
- Assyrian calendar: 5788
- Balinese saka calendar: 959–960
- Bengali calendar: 444–445
- Berber calendar: 1988
- English Regnal year: N/A
- Buddhist calendar: 1582
- Burmese calendar: 400
- Byzantine calendar: 6546–6547
- Chinese calendar: 丁丑年 (Fire Ox); 3735 or 3528 — to — 戊寅年 (Earth Tiger); 3736 or 3529
- Coptic calendar: 754–755
- Discordian calendar: 2204
- Ethiopian calendar: 1030–1031
- Hebrew calendar: 4798–4799
- Hindu calendars
- Vikram Samvat: 1094–1095
- Shaka Samvat: 959–960
- Kali Yuga: 4138–4139
- Holocene calendar: 11038
- Igbo calendar: 38–39
- Iranian calendar: 416–417
- Islamic calendar: 429–430
- Japanese calendar: Chōryaku 2 (長暦２年)
- Javanese calendar: 941–942
- Julian calendar: 1038; MXXXVIII
- Korean calendar: 3371
- Minguo calendar: 874 before ROC 民前874年
- Nanakshahi calendar: −430
- Seleucid era: 1349/1350 AG
- Thai solar calendar: 1580–1581
- Tibetan calendar: མེ་མོ་གླང་ལོ་ (female Fire-Ox); 1164 or 783 or 11 — to — ས་ཕོ་སྟག་ལོ་ (male Earth-Tiger); 1165 or 784 or 12

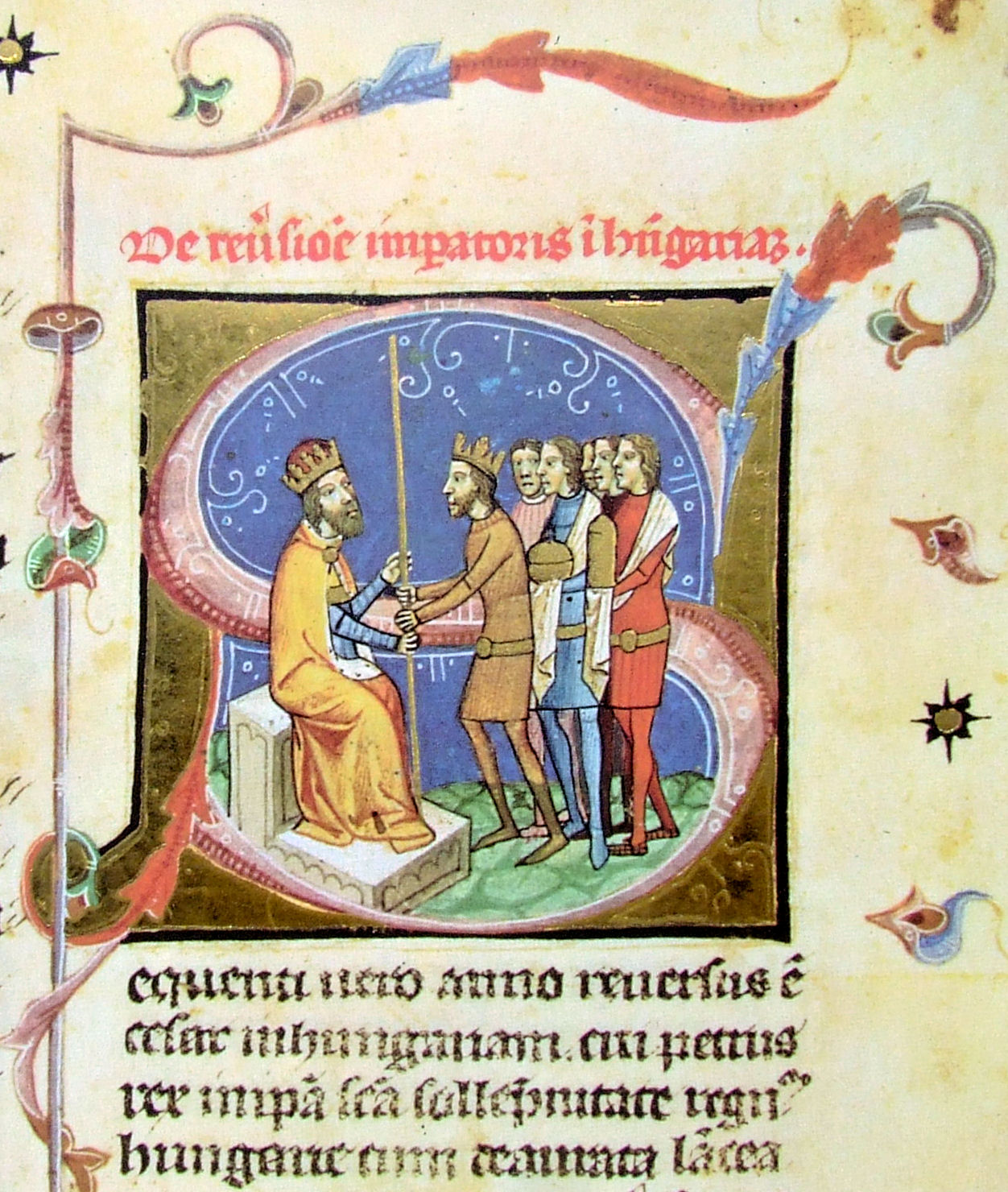
Peter Orseolo becomes king of Hungary

Year 1038 (MXXXVIII) was a common year starting on Sunday of the Julian calendar.

== Events ==
=== By place ===
==== Europe ====
- August 15 – On the death of his uncle, Stephen I, Peter Orseolo becomes the second ruler of Hungary.
- August – A battle occurs near the town of Alfuente, Andalucia, between the Taifa of Granada and the Taifa of Almeria, as described by the Jewish poet Samuel ibn Naghrela.
- Conrad II, Holy Roman Emperor ("the Elder") travels to Southern Italy and holds court in Troia. He orders Pandulf IV of Capua to restore the territories of Monte Cassino. Pandulf holes himself up in the fortress of Sant'Agata de' Goti, and dispatches tribute (300 lb of gold) and his son as hostage to Troia as a token of peace. Conrad accepts his offer, but the son escapes. Conrad goes on the offensive and seizes Capua, and gives it to Guaimar IV of Salerno.
- Duke John II drives his brother Manso II and his mother Maria out of Amalfi. He has Manso blinded and exiled to the island of Sirenuse. John reconciles with Maria, and allows her to remain as co-ruler of Amalfi.
- Duke Bretislav I of Bohemia invades Poland. He captures and destroys the cities of Gniezno and Poznań.
- The name of Versailles, at this time a small village, appears for the first time in a medieval charter in France.

==== Asia ====
- January 9 – An earthquake in Dingxiang, China kills an estimated 32,300.
- November 10 – Li Yuanhao proclaims himself Emperor of the Western Xia, declaring independence from the Song dynasty in China.

== Births ==
- Ibn Butlan, Arab Nestorian Christian physician (d. 1075)
- Isaac ibn Ghiyyat, Jewish rabbi and philosopher (d. 1089)
- Rostislav of Tmutarakan, Kievan Rus' prince (d. 1066)
- Sancho Garcés, Lord of Uncastillo, Spanish nobleman (approximate date)

== Deaths ==
- March – William VI, Duke of Aquitaine, French nobleman (b. 1004)
- March 28 – Hai Gaon, Jewish theologian (b. 939)
- April 23 – Liudolf of Brunswick, margrave of Frisia
- May 4 – Gotthard, bishop of Hildesheim (b. 960)
- May 22 – Shibl al-Dawla Nasr, Mirdasid emir of Aleppo
- July 6 – Ōnakatomi no Sukechika, Japanese poet (b. 954)
- July 18 – Gunhilda of Denmark, queen consort of Germany
- July – Herman IV, duke of Swabia (House of Babenberg)
- August 15 – Stephen I, king of Hungary
- November 1 – Herman I, Margrave of Meissen, German nobleman
- December 3 – Emma of Lesum, German noblewoman
- December 20 – Beorhtheah, bishop of Worcester
- Aethelnoth, archbishop of Canterbury
- Alice of Normandy, countess of Burgundy
- Al-Tha'alibi, Persian historian (b. 961)
- Budic of Nantes, French nobleman
- Ealdred, ealdorman of Bamburgh, murdered
- Ermengol II ("the Pilgrim"), count of Urgell
- Farrukhi Sistani, Persian poet (or 1037)
- Felix of Rhuys, Breton Benedictine abbot
- Habbus al-Muzaffar, Zirid ruler of Granada
- Kyiso, Burmese king of the Pagan Dynasty
- Ralph III of Valois (or Raoul), French nobleman

== Sources ==
- McGrath, Michael (2008). "Frustrated Empires: The Song-Tangut Xia War of 1038–1044", in Battlefronts Real and Imagined: War, Border, and Identity in the Chinese Middle Period, 151–190. Edited by Don J. Wyatt. New York, NY: Palgrave MacMillan. ISBN 978-1-4039-6084-9.
