= Sergius III of Amalfi =

Sergius III (or IV) (died November 1073) was the duke of Amalfi from 1069, when he succeeded his father John II, until his death. He was first appointed co-regent by his father in 1031. He and his father were expelled from Amalfi by his grandmother and uncle, Maria and Manso II, in April or May 1034.

In 1038, he returned with his father from exile in Naples, but they were forced out again the next year by Guaimar IV of Salerno. In 1052, they returned from an exile in Greece after Guaimar's assassination. The remaining years of John II's rule were peaceful except in regards to his relations with Gisulf II of Salerno, Guaimar's successor. Gisulf eventually made peace with John, but war broke out between Amalfi and Salerno on John's death. In 1071, Sergius (now sole ruler) was at Montecassino for the reconsecration of that great abbey. Gisulf was also present and Pope Alexander II worked out a peace between the two rulers. It lasted until Sergius' death in late 1073. He was succeeded by his infant son John III, who was soon deposed. Sergius is thus the last independent duke of Amalfi.

| Preceded by John II | Duke of Amalfi; 1069–1073 | Succeeded by John III |
