= Landulf V of Benevento =

Prince of Benevento

Landulf V (died September 1033) was the prince of Benevento from May 987, when he was first associated with his father Pandulf II, to his death. He was chief prince from his father's death in 1014.

In 999, Otto III visited the shrine of Saint Michael the Archangel at Monte Gargano. On his return through Benevento, he signed a diploma in favor of the monastery of Santa Sofia on 11 March. S. Sofia was the familial foundation of Landulf's line and probably acted as a sort of dynastic mausoleum. For reasons unknown, Otto and the Beneventan princes had a falling-out in 1000, possibly over the relics of Saint Bartholomew, patron saint of Benevento, to whom Otto had constructed a new church on the Isola Tiberina—San Bartolomeo all'Isola—just recently. According to the Annales Beneventani, Otto rex cum magno exercitu obsedit Benevento: "King Otto with a large army besieged Benevento." Nothing, however, came of it, except perhaps the yielding of certain relics (the skin of Bartholomew?).

In 1003, a rebellion led by Adelfer, Count of Avellino, ousted Landulf V and his father from Benevento. The princes did not remain exiled for long, however. In 1005, they are ruling from their capital again. The revolt was a bad sign, though, as civil unrest was rising in the principality.

He associated his son Pandulf III with the rule of Benevento in roughly 1012. Two years later, the elder Pandulf died, leaving Landulf sole prince with his son. Immediately after the death, the citizens of Benevento led a revolt against Landulf and Pandulf III. The rebellion, unlike the previous one of Adelfer, failed to dislodge the princes from power. However, the citizens did force concessions of authority to themselves and the city's aristocracy. The Annales say facta est communitas prima: "the first commune is made."

Landulf was forced to make submission to the Byzantine Empire, whose Italian catepan Boioannes had rebuilt the fortified city of Troia nearby. In 1022, the Emperor Henry II joined his army with two other armies under Poppo of Aquileia and Pilgrim of Cologne at Benevento, which submitted after a short siege. From there they marched on Troia, but failed to take it. After showing submission to the Holy Roman Emperor, Landulf is not mentioned in records until his death in September 1033. He was succeeded by his son Pandulf III. His other son, Atenulf, as later elected leader of the Normans in southern Italy.

Even more than his father's reign, Landulf's saw the decline of the principality. Forced to make submission to both Byzantium and then Henry II, Benevento could hardly claim even de facto independence any longer. Furthermore, the lengthy period (47 years) of his rule saw the beginnings of a Byzantine resurgence in Apulia and the Lombard response. Benevento did its best to be on the winning side, but only offered the anti-Greek rebels clandestine support. By his death, the once-great principality had dwindled territorially to little more than the city and its surrounding countryside.

== Sources ==
- Caravale, Mario (ed). Dizionario Biografico degli Italiani: LXIII Labroca – Laterza. Rome, 2004.

Preceded by Pandulf II	Prince of Benevento; 1014–1033	Succeeded by Pandulf III
