= John of Salerno =

John of Salerno (Italian: Giovanni da Salerno) may refer to

- John I of Salerno (died 1007), prince of Salerno (981–983) and duke of Amalfi (1004–1007)
- John II of Salerno (died 994), prince of Salerno (983–994)
- John III of Salerno (1317-1388), Augustinian friar, disciple of Simone Fidati da Cascia, and close to Angelo Clareno
- John of Ajello or John of Salerno (died 1169), Bishop of Catania (1167–1169)
- John of Salerno (cardinal), diplomat and Cardinal-priest of Santo Stefano al Monte Celio (1190–1208)
- John of Salerno (Dominican) (1190–1242), monk beatified in 1783
