= Rudolf of Benevento =

Italian aristocrat

Rudolf (also Rudolph or Rodolf, Italian Rodolfo) was the papal rector of the Principality of Benevento under Pope Leo IX from 1053 to 1054.

Rudolf was a Swabian captain who led that contingent of forces at the Battle of Civitate. His men were routed by Richard I of Aversa. Rudolf was made rector of Benevento after the pope concluded a treaty with the Normans. Rudolf did not hold his post for very long; the fickle Beneventans recalled their old princes, whom they had once expelled, Pandulf III and Landulf VI.

== Sources ==
- Gregorovius, Ferdinand. Rome in the Middle Ages Vol. IV Part 2. trans. Annie Hamilton. 1905.

| Preceded by Pandulf III | Rector of Benevento; 1053 – 1054 | Succeeded by Pandulf III |
