= Pandulf III =

Pandulf III may refer to:

- Pandulf III of Capua (died 1014)
- Pandulf III of Salerno (died 1052)
- Pandulf III of Benevento (died 1060)
