= Sergius I of Amalfi =

Italian duke

Sergius I (died 966/967) was the second Duke of Amalfi and first of the Musco Comite family.

In 958, Sergius, a citizen of the city of Amalfi, assassinated the first duke, Mastalus II and usurped the throne. He ruled jointly with his son Manso I, in order to establish a ducal dynasty as in Naples and Gaeta. When he died, Manso's succession was smooth.

Sergius had other sons named John, Adhemar, and Leo, as well as a son named Adelfer, who later also usurped rule in Amalfi.

Preceded by Mastalus II	Duke of Amalfi; 958–966	Succeeded by Manso I
