= Pandulf IV =

Pandulf IV may refer to:

- Pandulf IV of Capua (died 1049/50)
- Pandulf IV of Benevento (died 1074)
