= John III of Amalfi =

John III or John IV (the enumeration of Amalfitan rulers has never been standardised) was the duke of Amalfi briefly in 1073 by right of succession following the death of his father, Sergius III, in November. John was only an infant when his father died, The Amalfitans, who required a ruler who could defend them, quickly deposed and exiled him. Consequently, given the lack of an adult ruler, Amalfi surrendered to the Normans led by Robert Guiscard.

Preceded by Sergius III	Duke of Amalfi; 1073	Vacant Title next held by Gisulf
