= Manso (viceduke) =

Manso (fl. c. 1077–96) was a Lombard viceduke (vicedux) who ruled the Duchy of Amalfi during the reign of Roger Borsa, the Norman Duke of Apulia. He is known only from his coins: large, copper follari bearing the inscription MANSO VICEDUX on the reverse. Irregular and poor in quality, mostly overstrikes of Salernitan coins, they were originally attributed to Manso of Salerno (981–83).

The term vicedux is probably a title formed from Latin dux (duke), the traditional title of the rulers of Amalfi since the mid-tenth century, and the prefix vice-, indicating a deputy. It may, however, be an abbreviation, either for vicerosissimus (most beloved) dux or vicarius et dux (vicar and duke). Every coin attributed to Manso bears his name and title, sometimes surrounding a cross. Among the obverse images—many unexplained—found on coins bearing this inscription are: a bonneted bust (sometimes between two stars on a field of pellets), a crowned head, an open hand (the hand of God, manus Dei), a bull beneath the lettering VIC or IMA, a horse, a castle, and two towers (or perhaps one tower and the letter G).

No mention is made of a Manso vicedux in contemporary documents, but Manso II of Amalfi, deposed 1052/3, is known to have had a son named Manso, who in turn had a son Manso. This last Manso married a certain Gaitelgrima and was the father of John. Both Mansos appear in documents of 1080 and 1098 bearing the title dominus (lord). Probably one of these was appointed by Robert Guiscard or his son and successor, Roger Borsa, to rule Amalfi on their behalf. Since Robert preferred to use the title prince (princeps) after his conquest of the Principality of Salerno (1078), Roger, who consistently used the title duke, is the more likely, since the title viceduke implies a duke. Roger also had a reputation among his Norman followers for favouring Lombards in his service and is known to have permitted (or been too weak to resist) at least one other baronial coinage, that of Fulco of Basacers. There is conflicting testimony that either a coin of Manso's was struck over one of Robert's, or vice versa. It is certain that a coin of Manso's was struck over an anonymous coin (of the so-called Italie type) that is probably Roger's. The balance of evidence suggests that Manso minted his coins in Amalfi under Roger before 1096, when the Amalfitans rebelled against Norman rule under Marinus Sebastos. Manso likewise could not have been in power in 1088, when Gisulf II, the Salernitan prince deposed by Robert, briefly seized power in Amalfi with the support of the citizens.
