= John II of Amalfi =

John II was the duke of Amalfi from 1029 to 1069 with multiple interruptions. He was the son of Sergius II and Maria, sister of Pandulf IV of Capua. He was the last significant duke of Amalfi before the Norman conquest of 1073.

In 1014, he was named as co-regent and successor to his father. In 1028, he and his father fled to Constantinople while Maria and her younger son, Manso II, John's brother, usurped power at the instigation of her brother Pandulf. In 1029, John, but not Sergius, returned and reasserted his authority, deposing his mother and brother.

In 1031, John named his son Sergius III co-regent and successor and he received the title of patrikios from the Byzantine emperor, as his father had in 1010. In April or May 1034, John was forced to flee Amalfi again, this time because Pandulf had conquered Gaeta (1032) and was threatening the remaining coastal cities, including Naples, to which John fled, for Duke Sergius IV of Naples was likewise sheltering the deposed John V of Gaeta. Pandulf married off John's sister to Ranulf Drengot, the Norman mercenary who had recently been widowered by the duke of Naples' sister. Thus, Pandulf used his niece and his sister to seize power in Amalfi and draw his Norman supporters away from Sergius of Naples.

In 1038, the Holy Roman Emperor Conrad II deposed Pandulf and John was able to return to Amalfi. He blinded his brother Manso and exiled him to the island of Sirenuse, while reconciling with his mother, whom he allowed to co-reign. In April 1039, threatened by Guaimar IV of Salerno, he fled with his son to Greece. He worked for his own restitution and fomented a rebellion that expelled his brother from Amalfi in April 1052. The Amalfitans refused to pay their taxes and war broke out. Guaimar was assassinated in June at the Amalfitans' instigation and John could return to his duchy in October. He again exiled his brother Manso and Manso's son Guaimar, who had been ruling under Salernitan tutelage. During his stay in Constantinople, he was granted the Byzantine titles of anthypatos and vestes.

By stirring up rebellion in Amalfi and Salerno against Guaimar, he earned the wrath of Guaimar's son and successor, Gisulf II. He had to deal with Gisulf's mistreatment of Amalfitan traders and constant warmaking. Eventually, the two made peace. In 1055, John promulgated a charta iudicii, the only one of its kind in the history of Amalfi. The rest of his reign was peacefully uneventful. He died in 1069 and was succeeded by his son Sergius.

== Notes ==
Preceded by Sergius II	Duke of Amalfi; 1029–1069	Succeeded by Sergius III
