= Guaimar II =

Guaimar II may refer to:

- Guaimar II of Salerno (died 946)
- Guaimar II of Amalfi (r. 1047–1052)
