= Landulf VI =

Landulf VI may refer to:

- Landulf VI of Benevento
- Landulf VI of Capua
