= Salato =

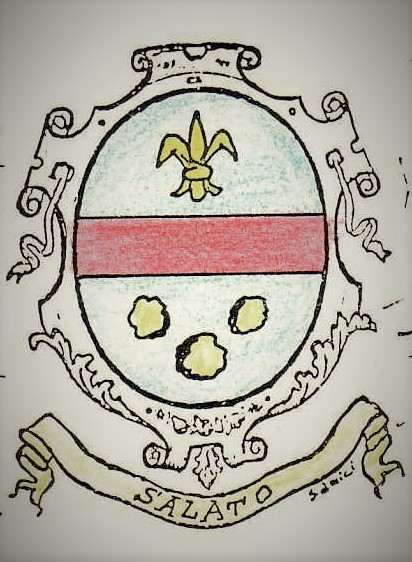

Salato is a surname.

The Salato surname is generally considered to be of Italian origin. Ancestral records date the surname back many centuries within Italy.

The oldest reference to the surname was a decree to Constantino Salato from Guaimar IV of Salerno dated July 7, 1039.

Notable people with the surname include:

- Allesandro Salato, Bishop of Minori from 1498 to 1509
