= Pandulf III of Salerno =

Pandulf III was briefly the Prince of Salerno from around 3 to 10 June 1052. He was the eldest of four brothers of Gemma, wife of Prince Guaimar IV. He seized the throne in a coup d'état, when he and his brother assassinated Guaimar. He reigned for only a week before he was forced to step down and was promptly murdered.

Pandulf was probably a member of the family of the counts of Teano in the Principality of Capua.

According to Amatus of Montecassino, who is the chief source for the coup of 1052, the first challenge to Guaimar's authority came from the Duchy of Amalfi, which was subject to Guaimar and owed him tribute. In April, Guaimar's representative, Duke Manso II, was forced to flee Amalfi, which began attacking Salernitan shipping. With the revenue from the tribute gone, some of Guaimar's leading men began to waiver in their loyalty. According to Amatus, the leader of the conspiracy to remove Guaimar was Pandulf, who offered to reward with benefices any who would help him become prince. Although Guaimar was apparently aware of the plot, he did not believe he was vulnerable. When the Amalfitans attacked Salerno from the sea, the Pandulf and his three brothers were ordered to defend the shore. They refused and, in the ensuing argument, stabbed Guaimar to death. They also killed his chamberlain and his brother, Duke Pandulf of Capaccio. They tried to kill his other brother, Duke Guy of Sorrento, but he escaped. Amatus gives the date of the assassinations as 3 June, while the Annales Beneventani give 2 June and Guaimar's death was commemorated in the Abbey of Montecassino on 4 June.

Following the assassinations, Pandulf was made prince and his three younger brothers swore fealty to him. His first act was to reverse several confiscations of land made by Guaimar. He succeeded in taking the citadel of Salerno because it was poorly stocked with food and could not hold out. Guaimar's sister and other relatives in the citadel were imprisoned. Guaimar's son and heir, Gisulf, also fell into Pandulf's hands.

The failure to kill Guy was the coup's undoing. Guy fled to Humphrey, the Norman count of Apulia and a faithful vassal of Guaimar. A Norman force arrived outside Salerno on 8 June. Two days later the gates were opened. Guy apparently negotiated the surrender of the citadel, promising to spare the lives of Pandulf and his co-conspirators in exchange for his nephew, Gisulf. The Normans did not feel bound by this agreement, and hunted down and killed Pandulf and thiry-five others to avenge the thirty-six wounds found on Guaimar's body. In Amatus' evaluation, Pandulf "was ill-advised to attempt to become prince with his three brothers".

Among those conspirators who were captured and imprisoned were the brothers of the future archbishop of Salerno, Alfanus I.
