= Pandulf III of Benevento =

Pandulf III (died 1060) was the prince of Benevento in the Mezzogiorno in medieval Italy, first as co-ruler with his father, Landulf V, and grandfather, Pandulf II, from between 1012 and 1014, when the elder Pandulf died. He co-ruled with his father until his death in 1033. Thereafter he was the primary ruler until his abdication in 1059 (except for a brief period).

Immediately after the death of Pandulf II, the citizens of Benevento led a revolt against the two princes, father and son. The rebellion failed to dislodge the princes from power. However, the citizens did force concessions of authority to themselves and the city's aristocracy. The Annales say facta est communitas prima: "the first commune is made."

Benevento was forced to make submission to the Byzantine Empire, whose Italian catepan Boioannes had built the fortified city of Troia nearby. In 1022, the Emperor Henry II joined his army with two other armies under Poppo of Aquileia and Pilgrim of Cologne at Benevento, which submitted after a quick siege. From there they marched on Troia, but failed to take it. After making submission to the Western Emperor, Landulf is not heard of again in the pages of history until his death and his son takes his place.

In August or September 1038, Pandulf associated his own son, Landulf VI, in the principality. Such co-regency was a tradition dating back to the will of Atenulf I of Capua in 910. In 1041, it was his brother Atenulf who incited a rebellion because he was not included in the regency. To the author of the meagre Annales Beneventani, this fuit [...] coniuratio secundo, the second conspiracy to remove the princes. Like the first of 1014, it failed.

In 1047, Emperor Henry III came down to secure his authority in the Mezzogiorno. The Empress Agnes visited Monte Gargano as a pilgrim and returned via Benevento, where she was accepted, but her husband denied. Henry III, angry at being denied, immediately laid siege to the city and Pope Clement II excommunicated Landulf and Pandulf and the citizenry. The siege was eventually lifted, however, the disrespect shown the imperial family and the church coupled with the principality's decline caused Pandulf's brother, Daufer (later Pope Victor III), to flee the city and take refuge with Guaimar IV of Salerno.

Beneventan matters came to a head in 1050, when Pope Leo IX went on a pilgrimage to Monte Gargano and reaffirmed the excommunication of the princes. The citizens turned on them and threw them out cum sculdays suis, "with their squire." The citizens turned the city over to the pope in April 1051 and on 5 July the pope accepted and entered his new city.

In the aftermath of the Battle of Civitate in 1053, in which the pope was imprisoned in Benevento, the city invited Pandulf and Landulf back (sometime between June 1053 and March 1054). Pandulf returned and ruled as a vassal of the pope. In 1056, he oversaw the association of his grandson Pandulf IV. In 1059, he abdicated to the monastery of Santa Sofia, the familial foundation and mausoleum of the Beneventan ruling house. He died there the next year.

== Sources ==
- Caravale, Mario (ed). Dizionario Biografico degli Italiani: LXIII Labroca – Laterza. Rome, 2004.

Preceded by Landulf V	Prince of Benevento; 1033–1053	Succeeded by Landulf VI
