= Chronicon Beneventanum =

Chronicon Beneventanum (Beneventan Chronicle) is the conventional title of two historical works:

- Annales Beneventani, covering the years 781–1130
- Chronicon Beneventanum of Falco of Benevento, covering the years 1102–39
