= Duke of Amalfi =

Ruler of a city-state in medieval Italy

Medieval Amalfi was ruled, in the tenth and eleventh centuries, by a series of dukes (Latin: duces), sometimes called dogi (singular: doge), corresponding with the republic of Venice, a maritime rival throughout the Middle Ages. Before the title of Duke of Amalfi was formally established in 957, various patricians governed the territory. Amalfi established itself as one of the earliest maritime trading powers renowned throughout the Mediterranean, considered for two centuries, one of the most powerful of the maritime republics.

The title of Duke of Amalfi was reestablished as a Spanish dukedom in 1642 by King Philip IV of Spain for Ottavio Piccolomini, an Imperial field marshal. Of noble Tuscan descent, two popes were scions of the Piccolomini family, and the first duke's younger brother, Ascanio II Piccolomini, served as archbishop of Siena from 1628 until 1671.

King Alfonso XIII of Spain revived the dukedom in 1902, and the title is extant.

== Independent rulers (839–1100) ==
=== Prefects ===
The prefecture's establishment is not certain, but the first elected prefect of Amalfi was in 839.

- Peter
- Marinus (first time)
- Sergius (I)
- 860–866 Maurus
- 870–876? Marinus (second time)
- 872–879 Pulcharius (co-ruled with Marinus)
- 883 Sergius (II)
- 898 Stephen
- 898–914 Manso (I)

=== Patricians ===
The time of the patricians (or judges) is not well known. The numbering of the rulers of Amalfi usually begins again with the judgeship. Mastalus was elected judge upon his succession in 914.

- 914–953 Mastalus I
  - 920–931 Leo
  - 939–947 John (I)
- 953–957 Mastalus II

=== Dukes ===
Mastalus was elected duke on his coming of age, but died the next year. A new dynasty was then inaugurated. It reigned uninterrupted for the next 115 years, except during the period 1039–1052, when the duke of Salerno conquered the duchy.

- 957–958 Mastalus II

==== House of Musco Comite ====
- 958–966 Sergius I (II)
- 966–1004 Manso I (II), also Prince of Salerno (981–983)
  - 984–986 Adelfer, in opposition to Manso
- 1004–1007 John I (II), also Prince of Salerno (981–983)
- 1007–1028 Sergius II (III)
- 1028–1029 Manso II (III) under regency of
  - 1028–1029 Maria, his mother
- 1029–1034 John II (III)
- 1034–1039 Maria, again, with
  - 1034–1038 Manso II (III), again, her son
  - 1038–1039 John II (III), again, her son

==== House of Salerno ====
- 1039–1052 Guaimar I, also Prince of Salerno (1027–1052)
  - 1043–1052 Manso II (III), under overlordship of Guaimar, deposed
  - 1047–1052 Guaimar II, son, co-ruled with his father Manso, deposed

==== House of Musco Comite ====
- 1052–1069 John II (III), again
- 1069–1073 Sergius III (IV)
- 1073 John III (IV)

==== Norman period ====
Amalfi was conquered by Robert Guiscard, duke of Apulia. Nevertheless, Amalfi rebelled twice, once electing the former prince of Salerno, Gisulf, and once electing a Neapolitan of that ducal family.

- 1088–1089 Gisulf, also Prince of Salerno (1052–1078)
- 1096–1100 Marinus Sebastus

A certain Manso ruled Amalfi—minting his own currency—under the title of vicedux (Vice-duke) sometime between 1077 and 1096, most probably during the reign of Robert's son Roger Borsa. Manso recognised Norman overlordship and was most probably a Norman appointee.

== Neapolitan dukedom (1388–1673) ==
The title of Duke of Amalfi (Duca di Amalfi in Italian) was revived under the Kingdom of Naples in the late 14th century, passing to the Piccolomini family in 1461.

- 1398–1405 Venceslao Sanseverino, also Count of Tricario and Chiaromonte, and Duke of Venosa
- 1405–1438 Giordano Colonna
- 1438–1459 Raimondo II del Balzo Orsini, also Prince of Salerno (died 1459)
- 1461–1493 Antonio Todeschini Piccolomini
- 1493–1498 Alfonso I Piccolomini, whose wife Giovanna is the title character in The Duchess of Malfi
- 1499–1559 Alfonso II Piccolomini
- 1559–1575 Cesare I Gonzaga
- 1584–1630 Ferrante II Gonzaga
- 1642–1656 Ottavio Piccolomini, created by Philip IV
- 1656–1673 Enea Silvio Piccolomini

== Spanish dukedom (1902–present) ==
Arms of the Spanish Dukes of Amalfi

The title was revived as Duque de Amalfi by Alfonso XIII of Spain in 1902.

- 1902–1912 Fulgencio Fuster y Fontes
- 1912–1945 Antonio de Zayas y Beaumont
- 1945–1959 Luis Moreno y Zayas
- 1959–1996 María del Carmen Cotoner y Cotoner
- 1996–2004 Íñigo Seoane y Cotoner
- 2004–present Íñigo Seoane García

As with other Spanish noble titles, the dukedom of Amalfi initially descended according to cognatic primogeniture, meaning that females could inherit the title if they had no brothers (or if their brothers had no issue). That changed in 2006, since when the eldest child (regardless of gender) can automatically succeed to noble family titles.

== See also ==
- The Duchess of Malfi

== Sources ==
- Chalandon, Ferdinand. Histoire de la domination normande en Italie et en Sicilie. Paris: 1907.
- Gay, Jules. L'Italie méridionale et l'empire Byzantin, vol. 2. New York: Burt Franklin, 1904.
- Skinner, Patricia. Family Power in Southern Italy: The Duchy of Gaeta and its Neighbours, 850–1139. Cambridge University Press, 1995.
- Skinner, Patricia. Medieval Amalfi and Its Diaspora, 800–1250. Oxford University Press, 2013.
- Stasser, Thierry. "Où sont les femmes?" Prosopon: The Journal of Prosopography (2006).
