= Manso River =

There are several rivers named Manso River.

== Argentina ==
- Manso River (Argentina and Chile)

== Brazil ==
- Manso River (Goiás)
- Manso River (Mato Grosso)
- Manso River (Minas Gerais)

== See also ==
- Manso (disambiguation)
