= Il Gallo Lungo =

Island of Italy

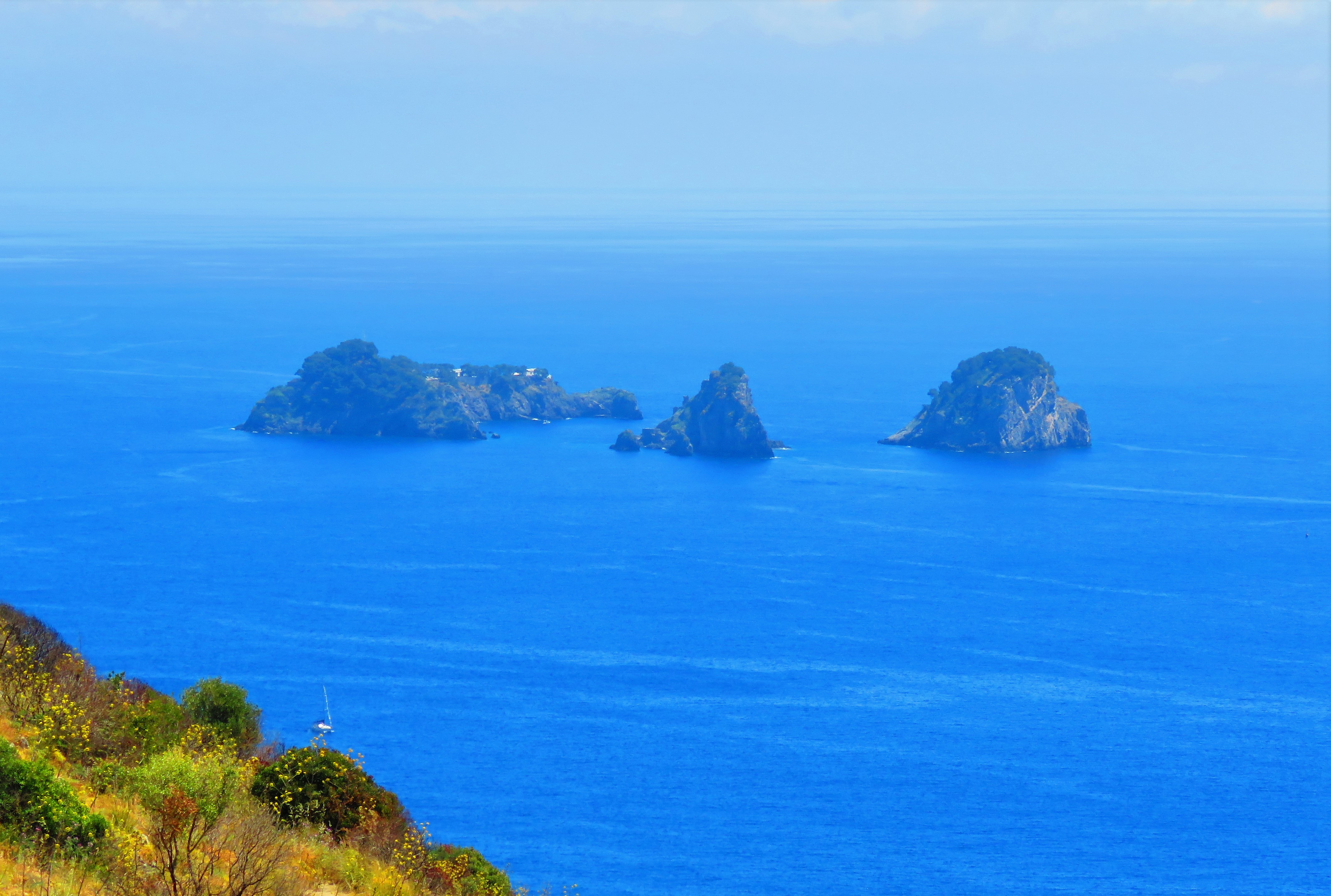
- Li Galli seen from Torca, the Gallo Lungo is the one furthest to the left

Highest point
- Coordinates: 40°34′57″N 14°26′05″E

Geography
- Location within Campania Location within Italy
- Location: Tyrrhenian Sea
- Country: Italy
- Region: Campania
- Group: Li Galli

Il Gallo Lungo is an island of Italy, in Campania. Belonging to the municipality of Positano, it is part of the Li Galli group. It is the largest of the three islands of the group, with the shape of a long sickle (or a dolphin), whose concavity, looking towards La Castelluccia and La Rotonda, defines a closed bay protected by other islets. On the convex side of Gallo Lungo, a small cove has been excavated, called "la Praja", with a very short beach, which allows boats to anchor. At the bottom of the cove there is a small house, while at the barren top of the island there is a coastal watchtower.

== History ==
Originally Gallo Lungo hosted a monastery and then a prison. During the reign Charles II of Naples (late 13th century), the Amalfi Coast became subject to increasing attacks by pirates. To deter them, Charles wished to build a watchtower on top of the remains of a Roman tower on Gallo Lungo. As he lacked sufficient funds he accepted an offer from Pasquale Celentano of Positano to lend the required funds, in return for being appointed warden of the fortification. The tower (today called the Aragonese Tower) was constructed around 1312 and occupied by a garrison of four soldiers. The wardenship was subsequently passed to Angelo Balbo in 1382 and in 1425 to Viviano Mirelli. Responsibility for the islands then passed to Catalian Gilberto Squanes, the Miroballo family and then to the Marino Mastrogiudice before passing to the crown and then the Marquises of Positano. Eventually with the establishment of the Republic of Italy ownership passed to the town of Positano. The town later sold the islands to a native of Salerno who sold them to Davide Pariato.

In 1919 the Russian choreographer and dancer Leonide Massine sighted the islands while staying with a friend in Positano. In 1922, he purchased Gallo Lungo and began converting it from a place of defense into a private residence. Initially Massine restored and converted the old Aragonese Tower on Gallo Lungo into accommodation with a dance studio and featuring an open-air theatre. The theatre was subsequently destroyed by a storm. With design advice from his friend Le Corbusier he constructed a villa on the site of the original Roman structure . The villa featured the bedrooms facing Positano with a large terrace garden on the first floor facing Cape Licosa and Capri.

Shirley Hazzard in her book Greene on Capri recounts a visit to Massine.

After Massine's death the islands were purchased in 1988 by Russian dancer Rudolf Nureyev, who spent the last years of his life here. He redecorated the villa in the Moorish style and clad its interiors with 19th-century tiles from Seville. He also installed a desalinization plant which provided a reliable water supply to and assisted in the development of the gardens,

After Nureyev's death the islands were purchased from his foundation in 1996 by Giovanni Russo, a Sorrento hotelier who besides using them as a private residence also makes them available for private rental with a staff of 7 and a launch to take guests to and from the mainland. Members of the public are not allowed to land but can swim in the surrounding waters.

== Bibliography ==
- Martinucci, Mimmo (2007). Sognando le isole italiane. Guida per radioamatori. Vol. 4 - Tutte le isole del mar Tirreno e del mar Jonio (in Italian). Albino: Sandit Libri. ISBN 978-88-89150-58-0.
