= Mastalus II of Amalfi =

Mastalus II (Italian: Mastalo) (died 958) was the first duke of Amalfi from 957 until his death.

He succeeded his father, John, as patricius in 953, when he was still a minor. He came of age in 957 and was elected dux, raising him to equal rank with the Dukes of Gaeta and Naples. In the next year, he was assassinated (Note: Kreutz mentions the assassination of Mastalus II in 958, but names no conspirator.) by Sergius of Musco Comite family on the Monte di Scala.

== Sources ==
- Kreutz, Barbara M. (1970). Amalfi and Salerno in the early Middle Ages. University of Wisconsin-Madison.
- Skinner, Patricia (2013). Medieval Amalfi and Its Diaspora, 800-1250. Oxford University Press.254

Preceded by Mastalus I	Duke of Amalfi; 957–958	Succeeded by Sergius I
