= John II of Salerno =

John the Accursed

Prince of Salerno
- In office 983–994
- Preceded by: Manso
- Succeeded by: Guaimar III of Salerno

Acting Regent of Salerno
- In office Early, 981 – Mid, 981
- Preceded by: None
- Succeeded by: None

Count of the Palace of Salerno
- In office ?–980?
- Preceded by: Unknown
- Succeeded by: Unknown

Personal details
- Born: Unknown
- Died: 994
- Spouse: Unknown

John II (died between 994), called the Accursed (Maledictus), son of John, Count of Salerno, was the count of the palace of Salerno in 980 and acting regent for Prince Pandulf II. He was pushed out with the prince by Manso, Duke of Amalfi, in 981. The rule of the Amalfitan and his son John was oppressive and the local populace rose in revolt and elected the Spoletan John prince in 983, expelling Manso.He tried, through appointing his scribe Toto as advocate, to control the monastery of San Massimo and her property, but failed. Together with his wife Sichelgaita, he founded S. Maria de Domno and put it directly under the authority of the Archdiocese of Salerno. Under its first abbot, Radoald, it was very successful, though John's attempts to control religion in his principality were less so. In January 984, John associated his son Guido with him, but Guido died in 988. Between January and March 989, he associated his next son Guaimar, who succeeded him. He left other sons in Pandulf, Lambert, John, and Peter.

According to a legend related by Peter Damian, there was an eruption of Mount Vesuvius and John exclaimed that surely it was an omen foretelling the death of some rich man, who would surely end up in hell. The next day, John was found dead in the arms of a prostitute.

Regnal titles
| Preceded by John I | Prince of Salerno; 983 – 994 | Succeeded by Guaimar III |
