= Guaimar II of Amalfi =

Duke of Amalfi

Guaimar II was the Duke of Amalfi, ruling alongside his father, Manso II, and under the suzerainty of his namesake, Guaimar IV of Salerno, from 1047, when his father first associated him, to his and his father's deposition in 1052 by his uncle, John II, after the assassination of the Prince of Salerno.
