= Maria of Amalfi =

Maria (c. 985 – c. 1040) was ruling Duchess of Amalfi in co-regency with her sons twice: in 1028–29 and in 1034–39. During the reigns of her sons, she appears to have held the actual de facto power.

== Life ==
She was one of the two daughters of Pandulf II of Benevento, who was also Pandulf III of Capua. She married Sergius II of Amalfi around 26 April 1002. Her sister Gaitelgrima married Guaimar III of Salerno, while her brothers, Landulf and Pandulf, became princes respectively of Benevento and Capua.

=== First rule ===
Maria had two sons, John and Manso. In 1028, she and the younger son, Manso, seized the Amalfitan throne and expelled Sergius and John, who fled to Constantinople. This was probably done at the instigation and with the support of her brother Pandulf. In 1029, John returned and deposed both Maria and Manso.

=== Second rule ===
In April or May 1034, John was again deposed by his mother and brother. This time it was certainly the result of Pandulf's interference, for Maria's daughter was married to Ranulf Drengot, the count of Aversa, in order to cement the alliance between Pandulf and the Normans. This daughter's existence is recorded by Amatus of Montecassino: "the Patrician of Amalfi's daughter, who was Prince Pandulf's niece, as the Patrician's wife was Pandulf's sister." The identity of this daughter had been confused, as has that of Ranulf's first wife.

Maria took the title ducissa et patricissa: "duchess and patricia". It is indicative of her power that Manso received no titles, not even from Byzantium, as his father and brother had before him. In 1038, her brother was deposed in Capua and John was able to return to Amalfi. He deposed his brother and reconciled with Maria, who subsequently joined him in blinding Manso and exiling him to the fortress of Castelluccia on Li Galli. This act of cruelty outraged the Amalfitans, who deposed both of them and accepted the rule of Guaimar IV of Salerno.
