= Stephen, Prefect of Amalfi =

Stephen (or Stefanus) was the Prefect of Amalfi from 879 to 898. He was married to a daughter of the first known prefect Marinus.

He succeeded his brother-in-law Pulcharius while the city was under an interdict. In 897, he entered into a war with the Duchy of Sorrento and that of Naples. He was captured by the Sorrentines, but ransomed, and died soon after. He was succeeded by Manso, of an unrelated clan.

Preceded by Pulcharius	Prefect of Amalfi; 879–898	Succeeded by Manso I
