= San Paolo di Civitate =

- Comune
- Comune di San Paolo di Civitate
- Coat of arms

- Location within Italy Location within Apulia
- Coordinates: 41°44′N 15°16′E
- Country: Italy
- Region: Apulia
- Province: Foggia (FG)

Government
  - Mayor: Francesco Gentile

Area
  - Total: 91.16 km^{2} (35.20 sq mi)
- Elevation: 163 m (535 ft)

Population (30 November 2017)
  - Total: 5,742
  - Density: 62.99/km^{2} (163.1/sq mi)
- Demonym: Sanpaolesi
- Time zone: UTC+1 (CET)
  - Summer (DST): UTC+2 (CEST)
- Postal code: 71010
- Dialing code: 0882
- Patron saint: St. Anthony of Padua and St. Paul
- Saint day: 13 June
- Website: Official website

San Paolo di Civitate is a town and comune in the province of Foggia in the Apulia region of south-east Italy. San Paolo di Civitate was historically an Arbëreshë settlement; the inhabitants, however, no longer use the Albanian language.

== History ==
San Paolo was founded in the mid-15th century, mostly as a colony of Albanians. Nearby had existed since the 1st millennium BC an ancient town of the Daunians, Teate or Tiati, known by the Romans as Teanum Apulum. Formerly known as San Paolo dei Greci, it was renamed San Paolo de Civitate in 1641.

In the Middle Ages, known as Civitate, the old town was the site of the Battle of Civitate (1053) between Papal and Norman forces.

Civitate was the seat of a diocese in the 11th century, when its bishop Amalgerius (or Amelgerius) took part in two provincial synods in 1061 and 1062. In 1302, shortly after his destruction of the Muslim settlement of Lucera, the Angevin king Charles II gave permission to a small group of Saracens originally from there to settle as a community of their own in Civitate but it never became of any significance. From 1545 to 1550 its bishop was the celebrated astrologer Luca Gaurico. In 1580, the seat of the bishopric was moved to San Severo. No longer a residential bishopric, Civitate is today listed by the Catholic Church as a titular see.
