= Santa Sofia, Benevento =

Church building in Benevento, Italy

Coordinates: 41°07′50.21″N 14°46′52.25″E

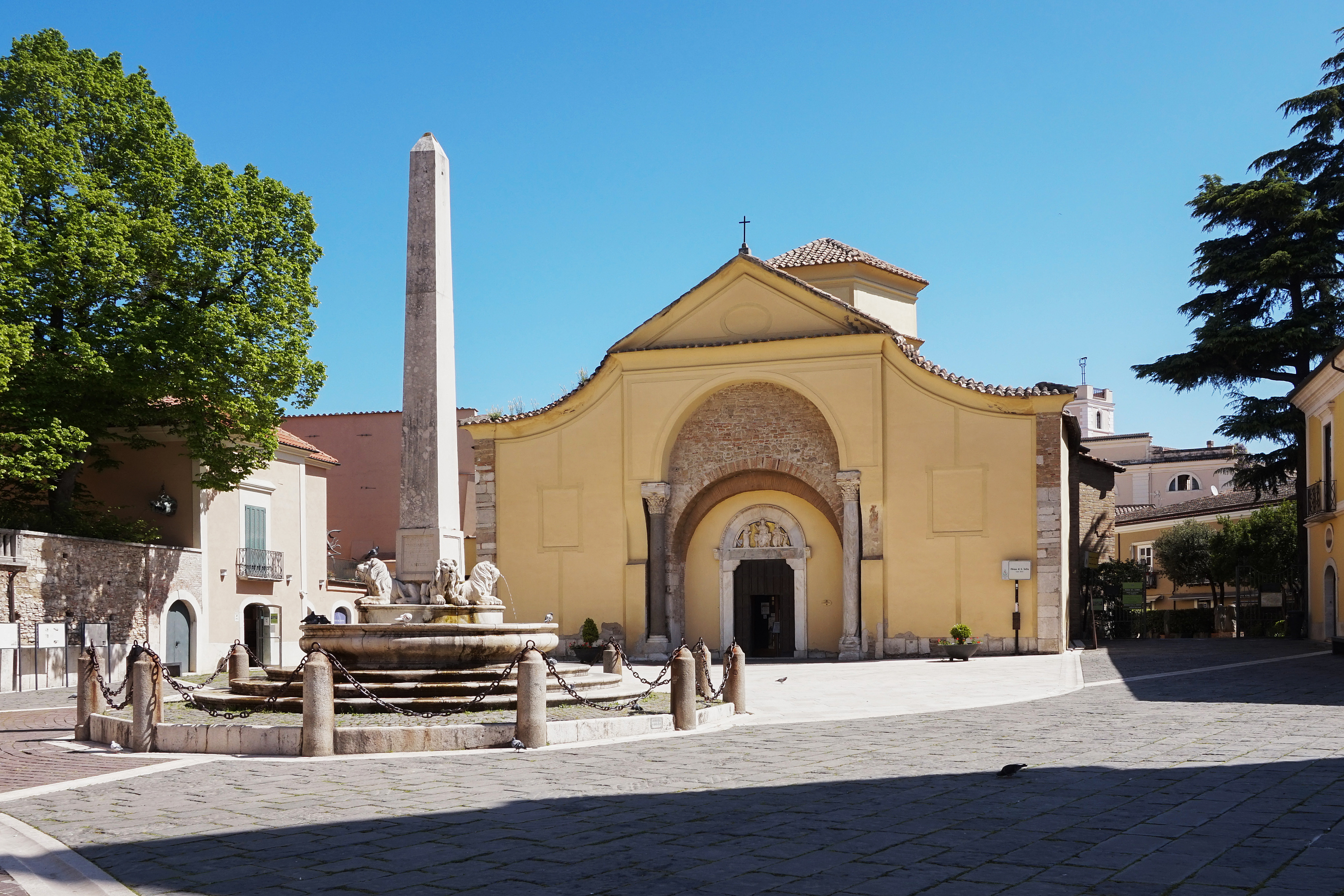
Santa Sofia

Santa Sofia is a Roman Catholic church in the town of Benevento, in the region of Campania, in southern Italy; founded in the late-8th century, it retains many elements of its original Lombard architecture.

In 2011, it became a UNESCO World Heritage Site as part of a group of seven inscribed as Longobards in Italy. Places of the power (568–774 A.D.).

== History ==
The church was founded by the Lombard Arechis II of Benevento around 760, as testified by numerous privileges signed by him, some of which are in the Museum of Samnium near the church. The edifice was modeled on the Palatine Chapel of the Lombard king Liutprand in Pavia and, after the defeat of Desiderius by Charlemagne and the fall of the Lombard kingdom in northern Italy (774), it became the national church of the Lombards who had taken shelter in the Duchy of Benevento. The church was part of a large program of construction which would legitimate Arechis' claim as the highest Lombard authority, after his failed attempt to acquire the title of king and the renaming of the duchy as a principality.

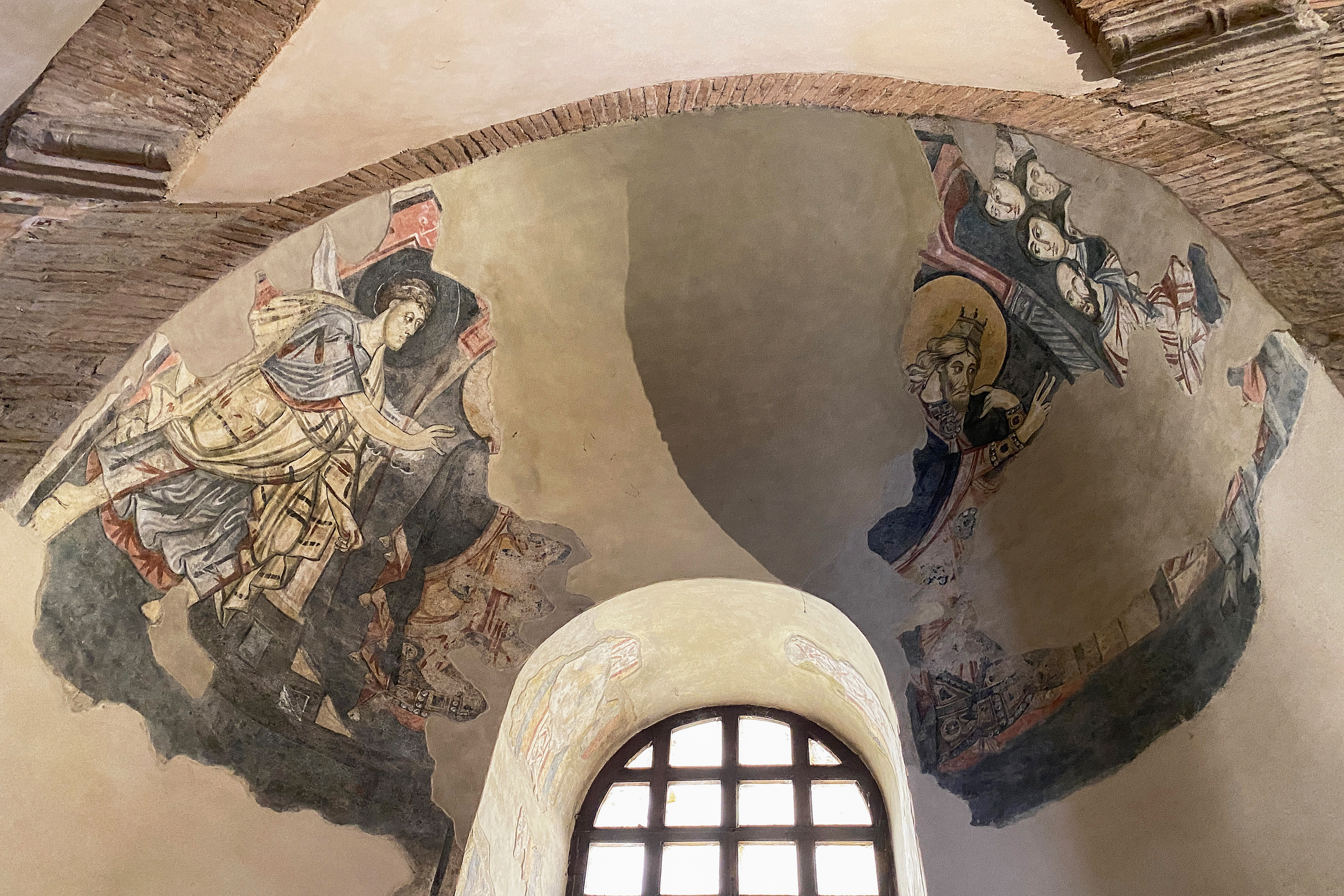
Detail of the frescoes, with the Annunciation of Zacharias.

Arechis dedicated it to Holy Wisdom ("Hagia Sophia" in Greek), like the Hagia Sophia church of Constantine in Constantinople; he also annexed a nearby Benedictine convent, which had been dependent on the Abbey of Montecassino. The convent was placed under the leadership of his sister, Gariperga. The sanctuary also housed the relics of Saint Mercurius, which putatively had been abandoned in 633 near Quintodecimo by the eastern Roman emperor Constans II.

The church was severely damaged by an earthquake in 1688 and another in 1702, which collapsed the original dome and some later medieval additions. Cardinal Orsini, the future Pope Benedict XIII, had the church rebuilt in Baroque style. The restoration work, started in 1705, transformed the plan from a stellar to a circular one, added two side chapels, and changed the appearance of the apse, of the façade and of the pillars. Further, the frescoes which decorated the interior were mostly destroyed: today only a few fragments, depicting the Stories of Christ and Mary, remain.

== Description ==
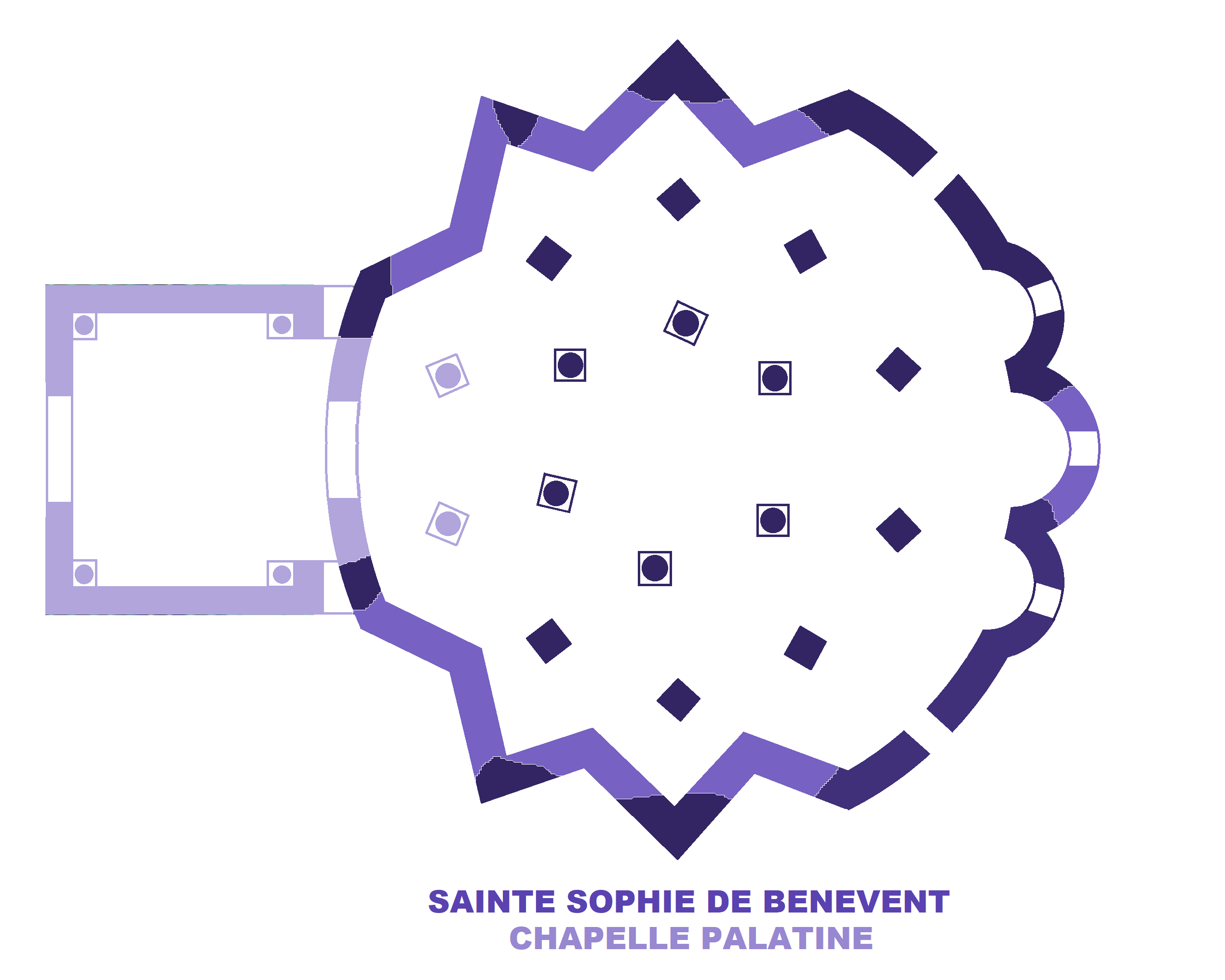
Plan

The church is on a central plan, with a diameter of 23.5 metres (77 ft), inspired by that of Hagia Sophia. In the center there are six columns, perhaps taken from the city's ancient Temple of Isis, placed at the vertices of a hexagon and connected by arches which support the dome. The internal hexagon is surrounded by a decagonal ring with eight pillars in white limestone and two columns at the sides of the entrance. The area of the three apses is circular, but the central and frontal parts form part of a star, interrupted by the portal, with four niches in the corners.

In 1957 most of the original appearance was restored, basing on evidence from historical documentation, with the exception of the Baroque façade. In the exterior, embedded in the 18th-century façade, is a Romanesque portal, whose lunette has a 13th-century bas-relief. The latter was originally part of the prothyrum, now destroyed, and depicts Christ enthroned between the Virgin, St Marcurius and Gregory the Abbot. The portal is flanked by two columns supporting another arch.

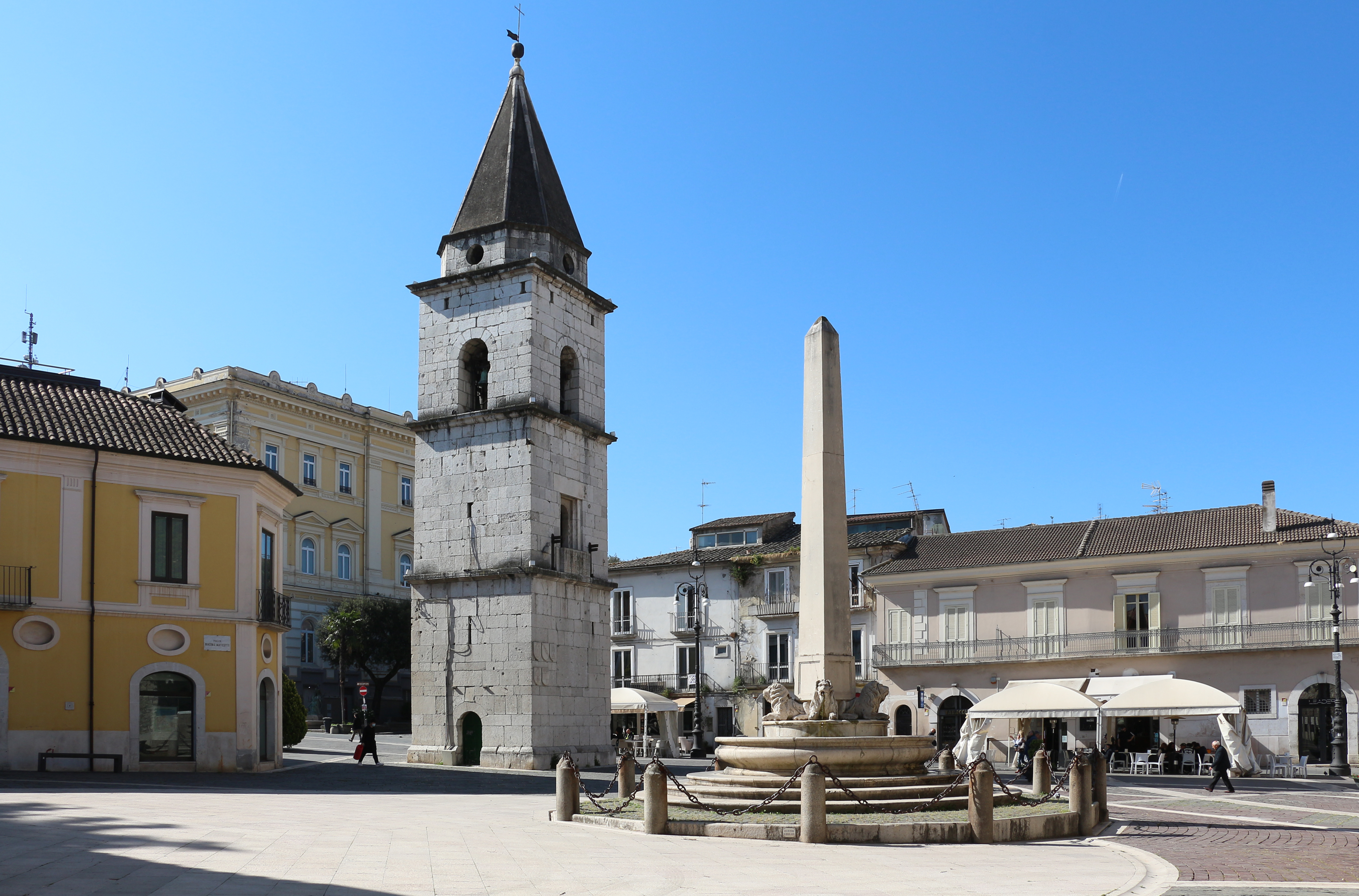
The church tower and the Chiaromonte fountain.

The structure was influenced by a variety of sources. The elevated central body recalls the no-longer extant church of Santa Maria in Pertica of Pavia, while the articulation of the volumes shows the influence of Byzantine architecture.

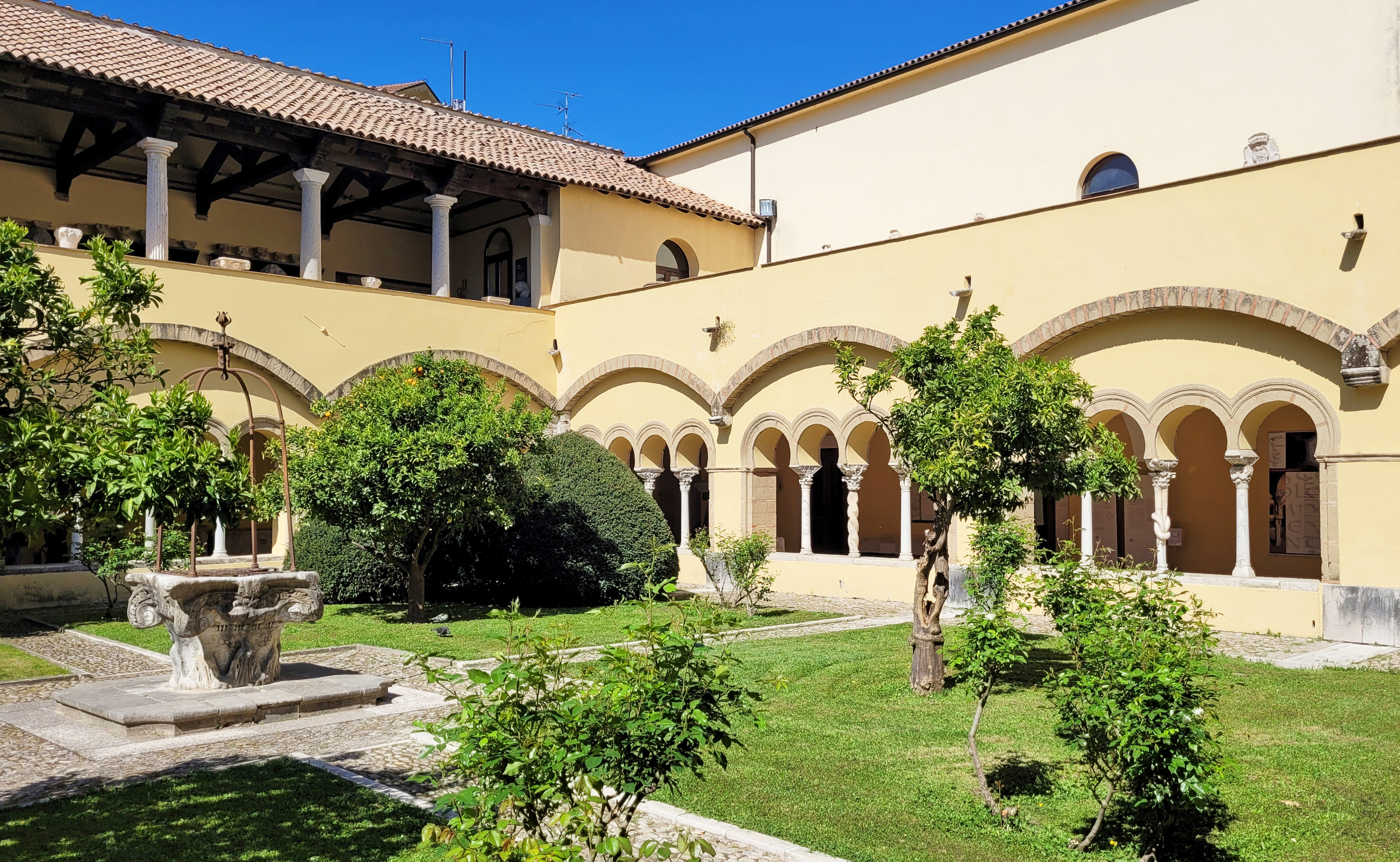
Cloister of the church.

Aside from some modern statues, artworks include the late 8th- to early 9th-century frescoes, of which only fragments survive in the two side apses: the Annunciation of Zacharias, Mutism of Zacharias, the Annunciation and the Visitation. They were executed by artists linked to the school of illuminators from Benevento.

The bell tower was built by abbot Gregory II while under the rule of Pandulf III of Salerno, as testified by an inscription in Lombard script, and protected the sepulchre of Arechis II. It collapsed in the earthquake of 1688 and was rebuilt in 1703 in a different position.

The church has a cloister from the 12th century, constructed in part of fragments of earlier buildings. The cloister gives access to the Samnium Museum, with sections of remains from antiquity and the Middle Ages. These include an obelisk, one of the two that once decorated the Temple of Isis. The other one can be still seen in the city's central Piazza Papiniano.
