= Sergius II of Amalfi =

Sergius II was the Patrician and Duke of Amalfi, the son and successor of John I, who co-reigned with his father until the latter's death in 1007.

Sergius made his own eldest son John II co-duke, but both of them were deposed in 1028 by his wife Maria of Capua and his younger son Manso II. He and John fled to Constantinople, whence he never returned. The date of his death is therefore unknown.

Besides his sons, who both ruled Amalfi on occasion, Sergius left a daughter by his wife Maria, who was the sister of Pandulf IV of Capua. Amatus of Montecassino wrote that "the daughter of the patrician of Amalfi, who was Pandulf's niece, as the patrician's wife was Pandulf's sister," married Ranulf Drengot.

Preceded by John I	Duke of Amalfi; 1007 – 1028	Succeeded by Manso II
