= Marinus Sebastus of Amalfi =

Duke of Amalfi (r. 1096–1100/10)

Marinus Sebastus (Italian: Marino Sebaste) was a scion of the dynasty of the Sergi (Dukes of Naples) and the Amalfitan family of the Capuano. He was a sebastos who was elected Duke of the Republic of Amalfi in 1096 in opposition to Norman suzerainty.

Bohemond of Taranto and Roger I of Sicily attacked Amalfi but were repulsed. It was at this siege that Bohemond met travelling warriors on the First Crusade and left to join them with an army. After his victory, Marinus strengthened the defences of the city and added 20,000 Saracen troops to the navy. He also created the ordo curialium, a court of justice, and recognised the autonomy and democracy of the citizenry.

Marinus was finally deposed by the Normans in alliance with certain Amalfitan noblemen sometime between 1100 and 1110.

Preceded by Gisulf	Duke of Amalfi; 1096 – c.1100	Succeeded by none
