= Manso (surname) =

Manso is a surname. Notable people with the surname include:

- Alonso Manso (1460–1539), Spanish bishop
- Damián Manso (born 1979), Argentine footballer
- Frimpong Manso (born 1959), Ghanaian footballer and manager
- Giovanni Battista Manso (17th century), Italian (Naples) patron of the arts, Marchese of Villa
- Johann Kaspar Friedrich Manso (1760–1826), German historian and philologist
- José Manso de Velasco, 1st Count of Superunda (1688–1767), Spanish soldier and politician
- Juan Manso de Contreras, Spanish governor of New Mexico, 1656-1659
- Shirley Frimpong-Manso (born 1977), Ghanaian film director, writer and producer
- Tomás Manso (1604-1659), Franciscan priest in New Mexico
- Will Manso (born 1975), American television journalist and host
