= John I of Amalfi =

John I (died 1007) was the duke of Amalfi (1004–1007) and prince of Salerno (981–983). He was the son of Manso I. His father associated him in the principality of Salerno, but their rule was unpopular and they were overthrown by John II. John inherited Amalfi on his father's death and ruled a short three years.

Preceded by Pandulf II	Prince of Salerno; 981–982	Succeeded by John II
Preceded by Manso I	Duke of Amalfi; 1004–1007	Succeeded by Sergius II
