= Quintodecimo =

Quintodecimo may refer to:

- Quintodecimo (frazione), now part of Acquasanta Terme
- Quintodecimo, name of ancient Aeclanum in the Middle Ages
