= Pandulf IV of Benevento =

Pandulf IV (c. 1020/1030s – 7 February 1074) was the co-prince of Benevento with his father Landulf VI from August 1056, when his grandfather Pandulf III was still reigning, to his own death in battle before that of his father.

Probably in 1059, the elder Pandulf abdicated and retired to the monastery of S. Sofia, leaving Landulf and the younger Pandulf sole princes. Pandulf was probably present on 1 October 1071 at the reconsecration of the Abbey of Monte Cassino. He does not appear in the 12 August 1073 charter in which his father swore fidelity to Pope Gregory VII. At that point, however, Landulf does not appear again in the chronicles and Pandulf seems to have taken over the main responsibilities as prince. Pandulf warred against the Normans. He was killed at the Battle of Montesarchio on 7 February 1074.
