= Manso, Prefect of Amalfi =

Manso I or II was the Prefect of Amalfi from 898 to 914.

He succeeded, or may have deposed, Stephen, a relative of the first ruling family, and to whom he was unrelated. In 900, he associated his son Mastalus with him, following a practice that was to become widespread in the Mezzogiorno. He retired to the monastery of Saint Benedict of Nursia in Scala, leaving Amalfi to his son, the first judge.

Preceded by Stephen	Prefect of Amalfi; 898 – 914	Succeeded by Mastalus I
