= Landulf VI of Benevento =

Landulf VI (died 27 November 1077) was the last Lombard prince of Benevento. Unlike his predecessors, he never had a chance to rule alone and independently. The principality lost its independence in 1051, at which point Landulf was only co-ruling with his father, Pandulf III.

Landulf was the eldest son of Pandulf III and he was first made co-prince in August or September 1038. In 1041, it was probably his brother Atenulf who led the rebellion because he was not made co-ruler as well. The revolt failed and Atenulf fled to the Normans, where he was elected their leader as princeps.

In 1047, Emperor Henry III came down to secure his authority in the Mezzogiorno. Empress Agnes visited Monte Gargano as a pilgrim and returned via Benevento, where she was accepted, but her husband denied. Henry III, angry at being denied, immediately laid siege to the city and Pope Clement II excommunicated Landulf and Pandulf and the citizenry. The siege was eventually lifted, however, the disrespect shown the imperial family and the church coupled with the principality's decline caused Landulf's uncle, Daufer, to flee the city and take refuge with Guaimar IV of Salerno, who housed the religious youth in La Cava. Landulf personally travelled to Salerno to meet with Guaimar and negotiate the return of Daufer. Daufer was returned with the promise that his choice of a monastic vocation would be respected.

Beneventan matters came to a head in 1050, when Pope Leo IX went on a pilgrimage to Monte Gargano and reaffirmed the excommunication of the princes. The citizens turned on them and threw them out. The citizens sent an embassy to the pope in Rome offered to put their city under him. In April 1051, Cardinal Humbert of Silva Candida and Domenic, Patriarch of Grado, entered Benevento to receive the city on the pope's behalf. On 5 July, the pope entered his new city on behalf of himself and the emperor.

In the aftermath of the Battle of Civitate in 1053, in which the pope was imprisoned in Benevento, the city invited Pandulf and Landulf back (sometime between June 1053 and March 1054). They returned by 1055 and ruled as vassals of the pope. In 1056, Landulf associated his son Pandulf IV. Probably in 1059, the elder Pandulf abdicated to the monastery of S. Sofia, leaving Landulf and Pandulf IV sole princes.

Landulf only appears scarcely in sources thereafter. In 1065, he was admonished by Pope Alexander II "that the conversion of Jews is not to be obtained by force." He was present on 1 October 1071 at the consecration of the Abbey of Monte Cassino. In August 1073, he swore fealty to Pope Gregory VII, his overlord, and promised to respect the rights of the citizens of Benevento. Gregory even began residing from time to time in Landulf's palace at Benevento, which Amatus calls lo plus grand palaiz ("the largest palace"). Landulf does not appear again in the chronicles and, after his son died in battle in 1074, died on 27 November 1077. With him leaving no clear successor of his dynasty, the principality of Benevento came to an end.

== Sources ==
- Caravale, Mario (ed). Dizionario Biografico degli Italiani: LXIII Labroca – Laterza. Rome, 2004.
- Gregorovius, Ferdinand. Rome in the Middle Ages Vol. IV Part 2. trans. Annie Hamilton. 1905.
- Simonsohn, Shlomo (1988). The Apostolic See and the Jews, Documents: 492-1404. Pontifical Institute of Mediaeval Studies.
- Cowdrey, H.E.J. (1983). The age of Abbot Desiderius: Montecassino, the Papacy, and the Normans in the Eleventh and Early Twelfth Centuries. Clarendon Press.
- Grierson, Philip; Blackburn, Mark A. S. (1986). Medieval European Coinage: With a Catalogue of the Coins in the Fitzwilliam Museum, Cambridge. Vol. I: The early Middle Ages, 5th-10th centuries. Cambridge University Press.

Preceded by Pandulf III	Prince of Benevento; 1059–1077	Succeeded by Robert Guiscard
