= Antonio de Zayas =

Spanish diplomat, writer and poet

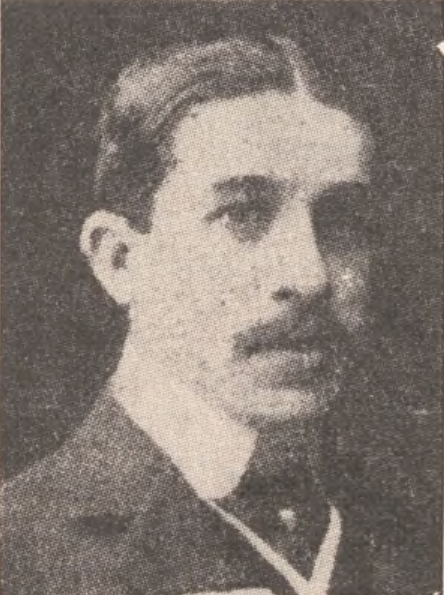
Image of Antonio de Zayas

Antonio de Zayas-Fernández de Córdoba y Beaumont, (3 September 1871 – 23 April 1945) was a Spanish diplomat and writer. As a poet, he is classified into the movement known as Hispanic Modernismo. He was born in Madrid on 3 September 1871 and died in Málaga in 1945.

He was the second of the 20th Century Dukes of Amalfi, a Spanish title revived by Alfonso XIII of Spain, which was purely titular and carried no authority over the Italian city of Amalfi.

== Diplomatic career ==
An aristocrat of Granada origins, Zayas was a friend of the Manuel and Antonio Machado brothers and actor Ricardo Calvo and was active in the Modernism against academicism and nineteenth-century rhetoric. He protested with Valle-Inclán, Villaespesa and many others, over the Nobel awarded to Jose Echegaray and made friends with Juan Valera and Marcelino Menéndez y Pelayo, for whom he wrote a eulogy when he died in 1912.

Around 1907, he translated Los Trofeos (the Trophies) (1893) by Jose Maria de Heredia, the most important book from this aesthetic. As a diplomat he lived for some time in Istanbul, a city to which he devoted the memoirs A orillas del Bósforo, Estocolmo, San Petersburgo, Bucarest, Berlín y México (On the banks of the Bosphorus, Stockholm, St Petersburg, Bucharest, Berlin and Mexico). He received the Grand Cross of the Order of the Polar Star from the hands of the King of Sweden, and also the Grand Cross of the Order of the Crown, a proposal by the Minister of Romania. He was stationed in Buenos Aires in 1926, in February 1927 but had to cease duties suddenly for protesting along with the aviator Ramon Franco for the establishment of a regular airline between France and Argentina, which Spain had long delayed. This caused Franco to be arrested and Zayas was unposted.

He spent the Civil War in the Royal Legation of Romania, where he was a diplomat. He died of arteriosclerosis in Málaga in 1945. He was succeeded by his nephew, the fifth Duke of Amalfi.

== Literary career ==
His first book, Poesías (Poems) (1892), of nineteenth century rhetoric and outdated Romanticism, was succeeded by Joyeles bizantinos (Byzantine jewels) (1902)- although the book is less decadent than its title. Next came Retratos antiguos (Old Portraits), in the same year. Paisajes (Landscapes) was released in 1903. This was his clearest venture into symbolism in that the work did not tend to marmoreally paint the outside but the soul. Noches blancas (White Nights) and Leyenda (Legend) were released in 1905 and 1906. They emphasized a vein of exaltation of the historical past of Spain that would, from then on, be usual in his work. In these books he showed a remarkable command of language and his gift for versification.

From 1907, in a very declared and sharp form, Antonio de Zayas abandoned any modernist fickleness and dedicated himself to defending what he would call the country tradition, with a rhetoric that got increasingly old. Antonio de Zayas hated foreignizing and decadent modernism for patriotic, moral and religious reasons.

His last publications were Plus Ultra (Ultra Plus) (1924), Epinicios, segunda serie ((Triumphant hymns), second series) (1926) and Ante el altar y en la lid (Before the altar and in the fray) (1942).

== Works ==
- Poesías (1892) - (Poems).
- A orillas del Bósforo. (On the shores of the Bosphorous) A travel book.
- Joyeles bizantinos (1902) - (Byzantine jewels).
- Retratos antiguos (1902) - (Old Portraits).
- Noches blancas (1905) - (White Nights).
- Leyenda (1906) - (Legend).
- Ensayos de crítica histórica y literaria (1907) - (Attempts at historical and literary criticism).
- Epinicios: Poesías (1912) - (Triumphant hymns).
- Plus Ultra: Poesías (1924) - (Ultra Plus).
- Epinicios, segunda serie (1926) - (Triumphant hymns, second series).
- Ante el altar y en la lid (1942) - (Before the altar and in the fray).
- El Conde Duque de Olivares y la decadencia española: Conferencia dada en el Ateneo de Madrid el día 4 de junio de 1895 - The Count-Duke of Olivares and Spanish decadence: Talk given at the Ateneo in Madrid on June 4, 1895.
