= Adelfer of Amalfi =

Adelfer or Adelferio was briefly the usurper duke of Amalfi from 984 to 986, while his brother, Manso I, was reigning in Salerno.

Manso returned to Amalfi in 986 and forced Adelfer to flee with his wife Drosa to Naples.

== Sources ==
- Ferrabino, Aldo (ed). Dizionario Biografico degli Italiani: I Aaron – Albertucci. Rome, 1960.
