= Manso I of Amalfi =

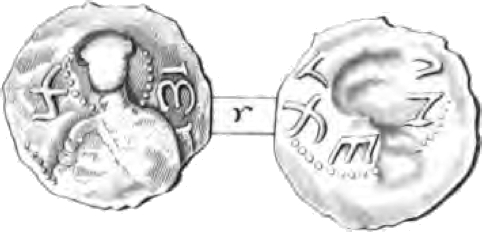
Coin attributed to Manso I

Manso I (Italian: Mansone) (died 1004) was the duke of Amalfi (966–1004) and prince of Salerno (981–983). He was the son of Duke Sergius I and the greatest independent ruler of Amalfi, which he controlled for nearly half a century. He is sometimes numbered Manso III.

When his father Sergius, of the Musco Comite family, assumed the Amalfitan throne in 958, he immediately associated his young son Manso with him. In 966, Manso succeeded to the full dukedom. He was even granted the Byzantine title patricius. From the start he had designs on the Principality of Salerno. In 977, he associated his own son John with him as co-duke.

In 973, Manso conspired with Landulf of Conza and Marinus II of Naples to depose Gisulf I of Salerno. In 974, Gisulf was reinstated by Pandulf Ironhead. In 981, Manso took advantage of the youth of Pandulf II of Salerno and invaded that principality, removing him from office. Emperor Otto II, who was then in Italy fighting the Byzantines and the Saracens and in need of allies, gave Manso the imperial recognition he desired. Manso associated John with him in the rule, but the Amalfitans were tyrannical and unpopular. In 983, they were overthrown by the people, who elected the exiled count of the palace, John Lambert.

Exiled from Salerno, Manso did not find refuge in Amalfi, where his brother Adelfer had begun to reign in opposition to him. Though Manso succeeded in reestablishing himself in Amalfi by 986, it seems that Adelfer and his other brothers, Ademarius and Leo, continued to claim co-authority until at least 998. Nevertheless, Manso continued to rule Amalfi until his death. He built the cathedral of S. Andrea Apostolo and succeeded in getting Pope John XV to make Amalfi an archiepiscopal see (987). When he died, he was succeeded by his adult son.

According to the Arab traveller Ibn Hawqal, writing in 977, described Amalfi as:

...the most prosperous Lombard city, the most noble, the most illustrious for its conditions, the most wealthy and opulent. The territory of Amalfi borders that of Naples; a beautiful city, but less important than Amalfi.

Regnal titles
Preceded by Pandulf II	Prince of Salerno; 981–982	Succeeded by John II
Preceded by Sergius I	Duke of Amalfi; 966–1004	Succeeded by John I
