= Poppo of Treffen =

Poppo of Treffen (also Wolfgang) was the fifty-seventh patriarch of Aquileia from 1019 to 1045. In 1020, Poppo commanded the smallest of three armies which Emperor Henry II (who had appointed him as patriarch) led through Italy. Poppo followed the Apennines and joined the other divisions to besiege Troia, the new fortress of the Byzantine catepan Basil Boioannes. The siege failed and all parties returned home.

In 1027, Poppo entered and sacked Grado, the rival patriarchate of northern Italy. Poppo's reign appeared to see the ultimate victory for Aquileia. On 6 April, Pope John XIX held a Lateran synod in which he declared for Aquileia, giving its bishop the patriarchal dignity and putting the bishop of Grado under his jurisdiction. The patriarch took precedence over all Italian bishops, in fact. In 1029, John revoked his decision and reaffirmed all the dignities of Grado.

Poppo later consecrated the new large cathedral at Aquileia in dedication to the Virgin Mary on 13 July 1031.

== Death ==
In 1044, Poppo reentered and sacked Grado but he was captured by the newly elected Doge of Venice, Domenico I Contarini. He was buried up to his neck. The Doge then left guards to watch over him until he died of exposure or starvation.

Preceded by John II	Patriarch of Aquileia; 1019–1045	Succeeded by Eberhard
