= Guaimar IV of Salerno =

11th-century Lombard prince

The Principality of Salerno as it existed in Guaimar's time. Guaimar extended his suzerainty over the Duchy of Amalfi and Principality of Capua and also over all continental Southern Italy, while the Duchy of Naples was a vassal for some years.

Guaimar IV (c. 1013 – 2, 3 or 4 June 1052) was Prince of Salerno (1027–1052), Duke of Amalfi (1039–1052), Duke of Gaeta (1040–1041), and Prince of Capua (1038–1047) in Southern Italy over the period from 1027 to 1052. He was an important figure in the final phase of Byzantine authority in the Mezzogiorno and the commencement of Norman power. He was, according to Amatus of Montecassino, "more courageous than his father, more generous and more courteous; indeed he possessed all the qualities a layman should have—except that he took an excessive delight in women."

== Early conquests ==
He was born around the year 1013, the eldest son of Guaimar III of Salerno by Gaitelgrima, daughter of Duke Pandulf II of Benevento. His elder half-brother, John (III), the son of Porpora of Tabellaria, reigned as co-prince from 1015. When he died in 1018, Guaimar was made co-prince. In 1022, the Emperor Henry II campaigned in southern Italy against the Greeks and sent Pilgrim, Archbishop of Cologne, to attack Pandulf IV of Capua, nicknamed the "Wolf of the Abruzzi", and Guaimar of Salerno. Pandulf was captured and Guaimar submitted, sending the younger Guaimar as a hostage. The emperor remanded him to Pope Benedict VIII and he was released. The younger Guaimar succeeded his father in Salerno in 1027 (at the age of fourteen or sixteen, possibly under the regency of his mother during his brief minority). He embarked then on a lifelong quest to control the whole of the southern third of the Italian Peninsula.

In 1036, he received word that his uncle and erstwhile ally, Pandulf of Capua, had attempted to rape his niece, the daughter of his wife's sister and the Duke of Sorrento. He then received the homage of the defecting Rainulf Drengot, formerly a vassal of Pandulf. Thus, Guaimar won the support of the Normans in the Mezzogiorno. In 1037, Guaimar made the politically savvy request of arbitration to both the Holy Roman and Byzantine emperors over the issue of Pandulf's unfitness to rule. Emperor Conrad II accepted the invitation and traveled south in Spring 1038. He demanded hostages from Pandulf. However, the hostages escaped and Capua was promptly besieged. Having taken that principality, he gave it to Guaimar (May), who asked for a title of nobility for his new Norman vassal. This was granted and Rainulf officially became "Count of Aversa" and a vassal of Salerno.

Guaimar set out to take possession of his new principality immediately. On 15 August, he conquered Rocca Vandra and gave it to the abbey of Monte Cassino. Meanwhile, the Normans of Aversa pacified the valley of the Sangro. After Pandulf fled to Constantinople, Guaimar turned his attention to Amalfi. In April 1039, in support of the deposed and blinded Manso II, Guaimar forced the abdication and exile of John II and his mother, Maria, a sister of Pandulf. Guaimar installed himself as duke. Then in July, he conquered Sorrento, which had been conquered by Pandulf in 1034. He gave it to his brother Guy with the title of duke. He also received the homage of the Duke of Naples as a vassal, John V, who had brought the request for mediation to Constantinople in 1037.

In the north, he brought Comino, Aquino, Traetto (May 1039), Venafro (October 1040), Pontecorvo and Sora under his rule. In June 1040, he took Gaeta, which had been conquered by Pandulf in 1032. After October 1041, Guaimar ceases to appear in the acts of Gaeta and it seems he was replaced by a popular usurper related to the old dynasty, Leo. By December 1042, however, Gaeta was in the hands of Rainulf, holding it from Guaimar.

== Hauteville alliance ==
Soon after, he became involved with the Hautevilles. The Byzantines, who had not responded to Guaimar's earlier request for help, were preparing an expedition under the great general Giorgio Maniace. Guaimar sent, at their request, a cohort of Lombard and Norman warriors, the first of which was one William, who, in Sicily, won the epithet "Iron Arm". In 1038, the Normans and Lombards returned in a rebellious state and quickly invaded Greek Apulia. In this, Guaimar supported them and, in 1042, they elected William Iron Arm as count and sought the approval of Guaimar, whom they acclaimed, in full opposition to any Byzantine claims, Duke of Apulia and Calabria (1043). Guaimar, in accordance with good feudal theory, granted them Melfi and the republican model on which it was set up. The feudal grounding was not so good in law, however. Guaimar was only duke by acclamation of the men he appointed as vassals and it was by the authority of the ducal title that he installed them in Melfi. This would cause him trouble later.

In 1044, he and the Iron Arm began to take Calabria and built a large castle at Squillace. In his later years, he had trouble retaining his possessions in the face of the Holy Roman Emperor and the Normans. Rainulf Drengot, who still held Aversa, originally from the Duke of Naples, died in 1045 and his county passed, against all protestation from Guaimar, to his nephew Asclettin. Later in that same year, Guaimar opposed the succession of Asclettin's cousin Rainulf Trincanocte, but again was overridden. These quarrels led the once-loyal Aversa to return its allegiance to Pandulf, lately returned from exile in Constantinople. War with Pandulf continued from 1042 to 1047. Guaimar secured his own position, however, by recognising William's brother Drogo shortly after William's death in 1046 and by giving him his sister Gaitelgrima in marriage.

== Later reversals ==
In 1047, however, Guaimar's life's work was undone. In that year Emperor Henry III came to demand homage from the dukes of the south. He returned Capua to Pandulf and took Aversa and Melfi directly under his suzerainty. Finally, he deprived Guaimar of his title over Apulia and Calabria, bringing to an end that troublesome feudal oddity. The emperor also besieged Benevento, where Empress Agnes was being held while the gates were shut to him. At that point, Daufer, the future Pope Victor III, brother of Pandulf III of Benevento, fled the city and sought the protection of Guaimar, who gave him refuge in La Trinità della Cava. Daufer's nephew Landulf personally traveled to Salerno to meet with Guaimar and negotiate the return of Daufer. Daufer was returned with the promise that his choice of a monastic vocation would be respected.

In 1048, Pandulf, once again prince of Capua, was at war with Guaimar. On the death in that year of Rainulf II of Aversa (Rainulf Trincanocte), his succeeding son Herman, an infant, required a regent. The first appointment, Bellebouche, was a failure. Richard Drengot, a cousin of Herman's, was then in a Melfitan prison for making war on Drogo. Guaimar soon procured his release and personally brought him to Aversa, where he was installed as regent, and later as count in his own right. Thus, Guaimar recaptured the allegiance of Aversa.

== Assassination ==
At a synod in Benevento in July 1051, Pope Leo IX besought Guaimar and Drogo to stop the Norman incursions on church lands. Soon Drogo was assassinated, probably by a Byzantine conspiracy. The next year, Guaimar too was assassinated in the harbour of his capital. The four assassins were the brothers of his wife Gemma. Guaimar's brother Pandulf of Capaccio was also killed, but Guy of Sorrento escaped while Guaimar's sister and niece were locked up. The brothers-in-law seized the city and elected Pandulf, eldest among them, prince. The date of Guaimar's assassination is given as 2 June in the Annales Beneventani, as 3 June in Amatus and as 4 June in the necrology of Monte Cassino.

Guy fled to the Normans and soon the four conspirators were besieged in Salerno by a large Norman force and Guy's Sorrentine army. The assassins' families soon fell into their enemies' hands and they negotiated their release by releasing Gisulf, Guaimar's son and heir, to Guy. Guy accepted their surrender soon after, promising not to harm them. The Normans, however, who maintained they were not bound by Guy's oath, massacred the four brothers and thirty-six others, one for each stab wound found in Guaimar's body. Thus the Normans showed their loyalty to Guaimar even after his death.

Guaimar's legacy includes his dominion, either by conquest or otherwise, over Salerno, Amalfi, Gaeta, Naples, Sorrento, Apulia, Calabria and Capua at one time or another. He was the last great Lombard prince of the south, but perhaps he is best known for his character, which the Lord Norwich sums up this way: "...without once breaking a promise or betraying a trust. Up to the day he died his honour and good faith had never once been called in question." Peter Damian, a contemporary, in a tract written for Pope Nicholas II, held a different view: Guaimar "was killed by the sword because of his many acts of violence and tyrannical oppression".

== Family ==
Guaimar married Gemma, a daughter of the Capuan count Laidulf. They were married before 1032. They had six sons, five of whom outlived them, and at least four daughters.

In 1037, Guaimar had made his eldest son John co-prince as John IV, but John died in 1039. Guaimar was succeeded by his second son Gisulf II (co-prince since 1042), whom the Normans put under their protection. His third son was Landulf, Lord of Policastro. His fourth son Guy was an ally of Robert Guiscard. His fifth son was John, Abbot of Curte. His youngest son, Guaimar, co-ruled with his brother Gisulf.

Guaimar's eldest daughter was Sichelgaita, who married Robert Guiscard. His younger daughter was Gaitelgrima whom he married to Drogo. (Note: Historian Joanna Drell calls Guaimar's eldest daughter Gaitelgrima.) She brought with her a large dowry. She married twice more: to Robert, Count of Monte Sant'Angelo, and to a Count Alfred. Humphrey, Drogo's brother and successor, is said to have married a daughter of Guaimar's, often assumed to be the widow of his brother, but this is impossible. Also, Jordan I of Capua is said to have married a woman named "Gatteclina", a sister of Sichelgaita.

== Sources ==
- Drell, Joanna H. (2002). Kinship & Conquest: Family Strategies in the Principality of Salerno During the Norman Period, 1077-1194. Cornell University Press.
- Gwatkin, H. M., Whitney, J. P. (ed) et al. The Cambridge Medieval History: Volume III. Cambridge University Press, 1926.
- Norwich, John Julius. The Normans in the South 1016-1130. Longmans: London, 1967.
- Caravale, Mario (ed). Dizionario Biografico degli Italiani: LX Grosso – Guglielmo da Forlì. Rome, 2003.
- Chalandon, Ferdinand. Histoire de la domination normande en Italie et en Sicilie. Paris, 1907.
- Gravett, Christopher and Nicolle, David. The Normans: Warrior Knights and their Castles. Osprey Publishing: Oxford, 2006.
- History of the Norman World.

Regnal titles
Preceded by Guaimar III	Prince of Salerno; 1027–1052	Succeeded by Gisulf II
Preceded by Pandulf IV	Prince of Capua; 1038–1047	Succeeded by Pandulf IV
Preceded by Pandulf IV	Duke of Gaeta; 1040–1041	Succeeded by Leo II
Preceded by John II	Duke of Amalfi; 1039–1052	Succeeded by John II
