= Manso II of Amalfi =

Manso II the Blind was the duke of Amalfi on three separate occasions: from 1028 to 1029, from 1034 to 1038, and from 1043 to 1052. He was the second son of Sergius II and Maria, sister of Pandulf IV of Capua. His whole ducal career consisted of wars with his brother, John II, over the throne. The Chronicon Amalfitanum (c. 1300) is an important source for his reign.

In 1028, he and his mother seized the throne, while Sergius and John fled to Constantinople. This was probably at the instigation of his uncle Pandulf. In 1029, John, but not Sergius, returned and reasserted his authority, deposing Manso and Maria. In April or May 1034, John was forced to flee Amalfi again for Naples and Manso and Maria retook the throne with the support of Pandulf. Maria took the titles ducissa et patricissa, but Manso received no titles from Byzantium: clearly, they had aligned themselves with the Lombards and not the Greeks.

In 1038, the Holy Roman Emperor Conrad II deposed Pandulf and John was able to return to Amalfi. He blinded Manso and exiled him to the island of Sirenuse, with the support of Maria, whom he allowed to co-reign. The cruelty of this act turned the citizenry against the duke and duchess and, in April 1039, they ousted John and Maria and accepted Guaimar IV of Salerno as duke. Guaimar appointed Manso to act as duke in 1040 or 1043, under Salernitan suzerainty. Manso named his son after Guaimar and appointed him co-duke in 1047. In 1052, the Amalfitans, who loved Manso, rebelled nevertheless over the burden of Salernitan taxation. John was able to seize power again.

In addition to his son Guaimar, he had a son named Manso, who in turn had a son named Manso, who married a Gaitelgrima and had a son named John. Either one of these may be the viceduke Manso known only from coins of the period. He may have had a daughter who married Ranulf Drengot.
