= Annales Beneventani =

Series of Latin annals

The Annales Beneventani ("Beneventan Annals"), also called the Breve chronicon monasterii Sanctae Sophiae Beneventi ("Brief Chronicle of the Monastery of Santa Sofia of Benevento") or Chronicon Sanctae Sophiae for short, is a series of Latin annals from the monastery of Santa Sofia in Benevento, southern Italy. The annal entries were originally annotations written in the margins of Paschal tables, a practice that probably dates to the foundation of the monastery in the second half of the eighth century. The annotations were gathered together and copied into manuscripts in the early twelfth century. Three such manuscripts exist, each copied at Santa Sofia and each presenting a different redaction of the annals. The Annales is of interest primarily because its entries are roughly contemporaneous with the events they describe.

Version A.1 in manuscript Vatican, BAV, vat. lat. 4928, fol. 1^{r}–8^{v}, copied between 1113 and 1118, covers the years 787–1113. Version A.2 in manuscript Vatican BAV, vat. lat. 4939, fol. 1^{r}–15^{r}, copied in 1119, has entries added for the years before 787 all the way back to the birth of Jesus; it also has entries for the years down to 1128. It is found in the same manuscript as the monastery's cartulary, a collection of canon law and a list of the princes of Benevento. Version A.3 in manuscript Naples, BN, VI E 43, fol. 17r–18^{v}, copied between 1107 and 1118, has entries for the years from 1096 to 1130. It is the only version in which the annals are marginal annotations to a Paschal table, which would have been the form of the original manuscript(s) from which all three surviving redactions are derived. A fourth redaction once accepted as genuine has been identified as an eighteenth-century forgery. Ottorino Bertolini made the first critical edition based on all three texts in 1923.

The Annales have a distinctly Beneventan and south Italian perspective. The succession of Byzantine emperors is recorded into the ninth century, while the neither the Carolingian nor the Ottonian emperors are recognised as such, being referred to only as "kings". The succession of princes of Benevento is recorded down to the end the principality around 1050, when the city came under papal rule. Thereafter, the Annales record the succession of popes. The entries are more detailed from the tenth century onwards, but few are about the monastery itself.

== Editions ==
Synoptic edition

- Bertolini, Ottorino. "Annales Beneventani Monasterii Sanctae Sophiae". Bollettino dell'Istituto storico Italiano e Archivio Muratoriano, 42 (1923), pp. 1–163.

Forged redaction

- Pertz, Georg H. "Annales Beneventani". Monumenta Germaniae Historica, Scriptores 3 (1839), pp. 173–85.
