= Sirenuse =

Archipelago of islands off the Amalfi Coast of Italy

Coordinates: 40.581°N 14.433°E

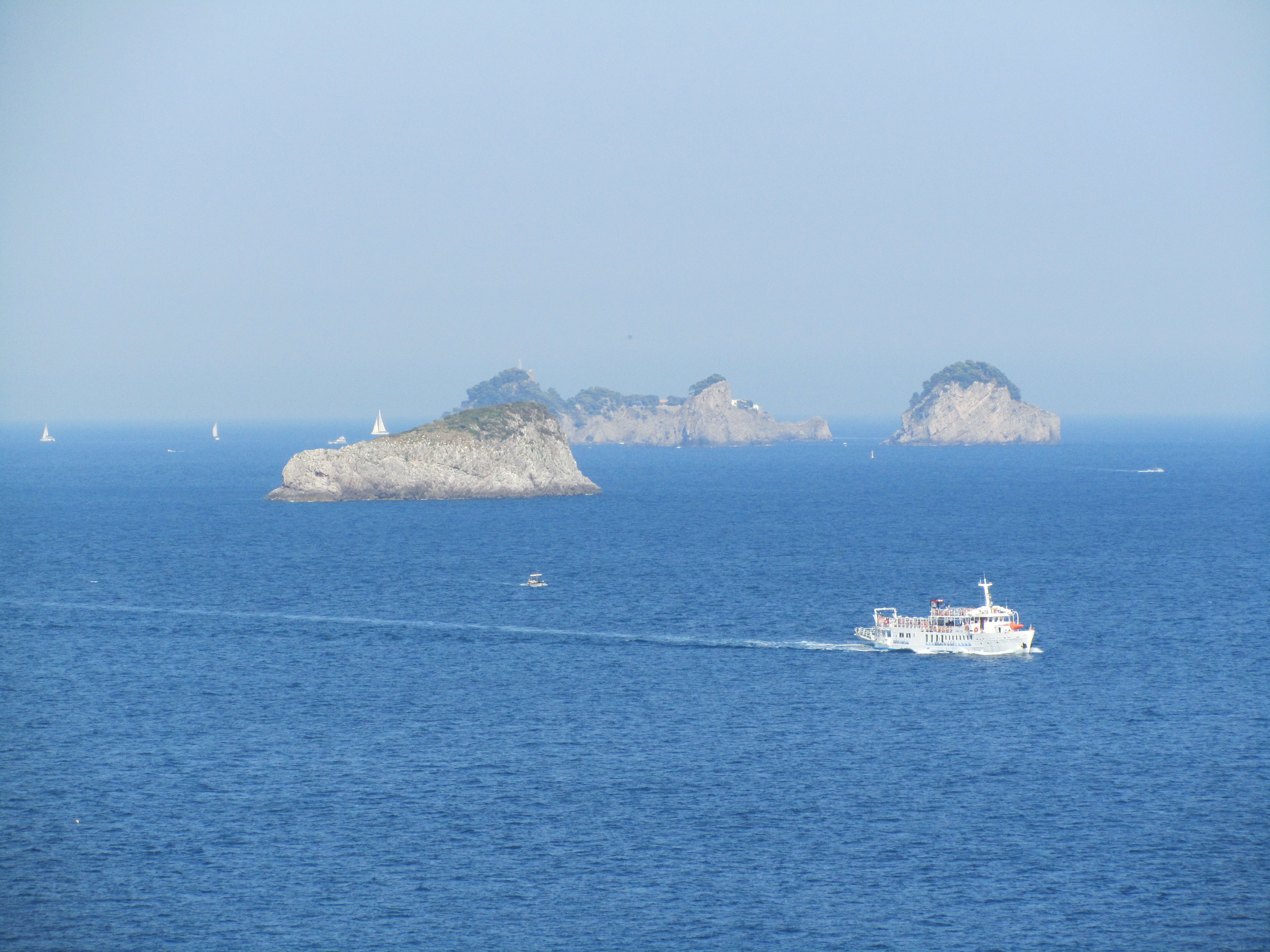
View of the archipelago.

The Sirenusas (Italian: Le Sirenuse), also known as the Gallos (Li Galli, "the Cocks"), are an archipelago of little islands off the Amalfi Coast of Italy between Isle of Capri and 6 km (4 mi) southwest of Province of Salerno's Positano, to which it is administratively attached. They are part of the Campanian Archipelago. The name, Sirenuse, is a reference to the mythological sirens said to have lived there.

== Extent ==
The archipelago consists of three main islands:

- Il Gallo Lungo, which takes the form of a dolphin
- La Castelluccia, also known as Gallo dei Briganti
- the nearly circular La Rotonda

Smaller islets include, nearer the shore, Isca and, midway between the main islands and Isca, a prominent rocky outcropping that juts above the water, Vetara.

== Mythology ==
Several sirens were said to have inhabited the islands, the most famous of whom were Parthenope, Leucosia, and Ligeia. One of them played the lyre, another sang, and another played the flute. They are mentioned in the 1st century BC by Strabo, the Greek Geographer and by Straton of Sardis in 120 AD. In ancient stories, the sirens were depicted as having bodies of a bird and human heads, but the medieval interpretations of the stories depicted them as mermaids.

The terms Sirenai and Sirenusai, from the Latin Sirenusae, meaning indicate both the sirens themselves and their residence.

The modern name, I Galli or The Cocks, references the bird-like form of the ancient sirens.

== History ==
Originally the site of an ancient Roman anchorage, in the Middle Ages the islands became medieval fiefdoms of the 13th-century Emperor Frederick II and the Capetian House of Anjou.

=== Isca ===
The Neapolitan playwright Eduardo De Filippo purchased this island, which was later owned by his son Luca De Filippo.

Isca has a villa and garden on the side facing the cliff (and, thus, not visible if sailing behind the island). The island was described by the playwright’s wife, Isabella, in a book entitled, In mezzo al mare un'isola c'è... ("There is an island in the sea…").

The property has been on and off the market for years. A public listing of the three islands in 2011 was for US$268,000,000.

== Sources ==
- Berger, Diane (1999). Rivera Style (hardback). London: Scriptum Editions. pp. 215 pages. ISBN 1-902686-01-2.
- Fisher, Robert (2011). Close to Paradise – The Gardens of Naples, Capri & the Amalfi Coast (hardback). London: Frances Lincoln Limited. pp. 2008 pages. ISBN 978-0-7112-3038-5.
- Sabella, Giuseppe; Sabella, Roberto (2010). Positano (paperback). Salerno: Matonti Editore. pp. 64 pages.
