= Gisulf II of Salerno =

Italian prince

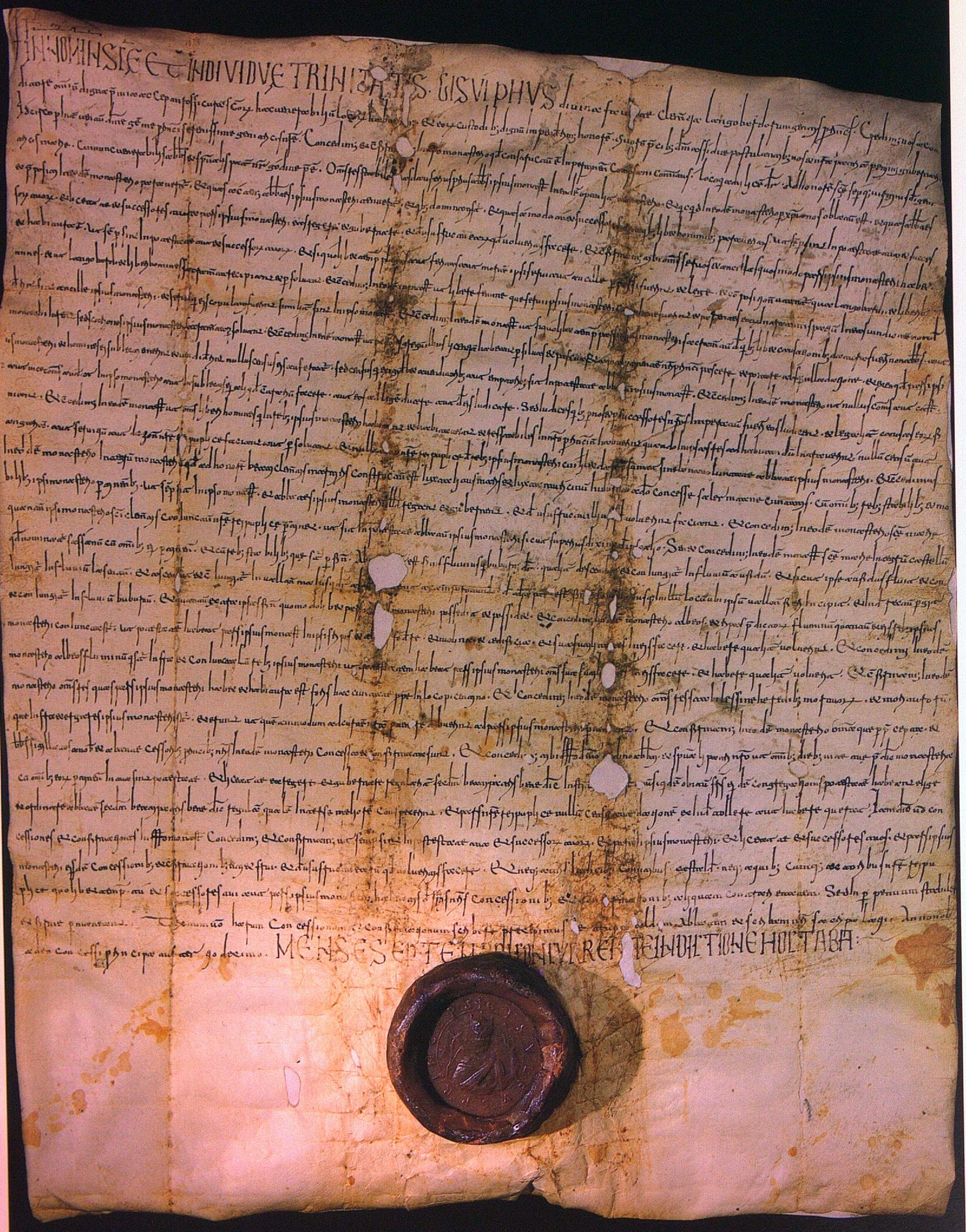
A charter issued by Gisulf II of Salerno in 1054. Vatican City, Archivio Segreto Vaticano, Archivio Boncompagni, Prot. 270, 2a

Gisulf II (also spelled Gisulph, Latin Gisulphus or Gisulfus, and Italian Gisulfo or Gisolfo) (born c. 1030 – died 1091) was the last Lombard prince of Salerno (1052–1077).

== Life ==
Gisulf was the eldest son and successor of Guaimar IV and Gemma, daughter of the Capuan count Laidulf. He appears as a villain and a pirate in the chronicle of Amatus of Montecassino, Ystoire de li Normant. Historian John Julius Norwich (The Normans in the South pg. 201n) speaks "of one unfortunate victim [an Amalfitan] whom Gisulf kept in an icy dungeon, removing first his right eye and then every day one more of his fingers and toes. He [Amatus] adds that the Empress Agnes—who was spending much of her time in South Italy—personally offered a hundred pounds of gold and one of her own fingers in ransom, but her prayers went unheard."

He was made co-prince with his father in 1042 while very young and, only a decade later, his father was assassinated in the harbour of his capital by four brothers, sons of Pandulf V of Capua and inlaws of Guaimar, who had been goaded into the act by the Byzantine partisans of Amalfi. Young Gisulf was taken captive by the assassins, but soon his uncle, Guy, the duke of Sorrento, had garnered a Norman army and was besieging Salerno. Guy took captive the assassins' families and negotiated the freedom of Gisulf. Soon the city had surrendered and Guy and the Normans paid homage to Gisulf, who confirmed their titles and lands. The rocky start to his reign was merely an indication of its character, for Gisulf held a grudge against the Amalfitans who initiated the slaying of his father. He also, for reasons unknown, came to hate the Normans as barbarians and spent his whole reign in opposition to them.

His enmity with the Normans soon cost him. Robert Guiscard sallied forth from his Calabrian castle at San Marco and captured the Salernitan town of Cosenza and several of its neighbours. Gisulf soon raised the ire of Count Richard I of Aversa and, only by alliance with the despised Almafitans, could he retain his throne. The predations of William, Count of the Principate, a brother of Guiscard, forced him to marry his sister Sichelgaita to Guiscard in return for protection, and eventually his sister Gaitelgrima to Jordan, the son of Richard, recently prince of Capua. In 1071, he and Richard of Capua threw their support behind a rebellion of Abelard of Hauteville and Herman of Hauteville, nephews of Robert Guiscard, and several other minor lords against Guiscard's authority in his duchy of Apulia. The rising accomplished little but to further irritate his powerful brother-in-law.

In his later years, his fleets turned to piracy, especially against Amalfi and even Pisa. The latter's merchants, when called on to serve Pope Gregory VII on behalf of the Marchioness Matilda of Tuscany, caused such a stir with Gisulf that the latter was sent to Rome by the pope and the army—assembled to march on Robert Guiscard's domain—dispersed. Having alienated his papal ally, he was more isolated than ever when, in the summer of 1076, his city was besieged by Richard of Capua and Robert Guiscard. Though he had wisely ordered his citizens to store up two years worth of food, he confiscated enough of it to continue his life of luxury that the citizenry was soon starving. On 13 December, the city submitted and the prince and his men retreated to the citadel, which fell in May of the next year. Gisulf's lands and relics were taken, and he went, free, to Capua, where he tried to incite Richard to war with Robert, but to no effect. He went on to Rome to notify the pope of his and Salerno's misfortunes and there he slowly faded out of view.

Pope Gregory gave him military command of the Campania and sent him to France, but he was recalled on the pope's death in 1085. He allied with Jordan I of Capua in support of Desiderius of Benevento, who was duly elected as Pope Victor III.

He was briefly made duke of Amalfi (March 1088 – 20 April 1089) by the citizens of that city to protect them from the invasions of Robert Guiscard, but he was dead by 1091 in Sarno. He left no children by his wife Gemma, whom he apparently repudiated.

Regnal titles
Preceded by Guaimar IV	Prince of Salerno; 1052–1078	Principality abolished
