= Ivo of Bellême (bishop of Sées) =

11th-century bishop of Séez

Bishop of Séez
- Died: c. 1071
- Venerated in: Roman Catholic Church

Ivo (Yves) de Bellême (died c. 1071), was simultaneously Bishop of Séez and lord of Bellême from c. 1047/8 to c. 1071. He was the son of William of Bellême and brother of William I Talvas.

Yves inherited a chaotic situation around 1047/8, as his brother had become entangled in a conflict with the family of Giroie, and a revolt from his son Arnulf had overthrown him. Arnulf himself was soon murdered and Ivo, being the only remaining male in the direct line, assumed both the bishopric of Sées and the lordship of Bellême. He soon made peace with the Giroie, but faced a rebellion by the family of the Sorengi (Richard, Robert and Avesgot, sons of William Sorengi). They seized the cathedral, but Ivo, with the help of Hugh de Grandmesnil, beat them back at the cost of badly damaging the cathedral in a fire. Yves repaired the roof, rededicating the building on 2 January 1049, but the walls collapsed soon thereafter. The construction of a new building was started soon, and by 1068 was advanced enough for Ivo to hold a synod, however it was not completed until 1126.

After pacifying his Diocese, he went on a trip that took him first to the council of Rheims (October 1049), then to Apulia on a successful fundraising campaign. From there, he went to Constantinople, where he received a relic of the true cross from the Emperor, presumably Constantine IX Monomachos. The date of his return is unclear, but is usually given as 1053.

In 1059, he invested Robert de Grandmesnil as abbot of Saint-Evroul. In 1060, he gave his consent to the refoundation of the abbey of Saint-Martin de Sées by Roger de Montgomery, an event that indicates he was already in the political orbit of the Norman dukes, and could indicate he abandoned his traditional alliance with the Angevin counts. He was present in 1066 at the meeting where the invasion of England was discussed, but he neither participated nor lent support, as can be deduced from him not getting any English possessions after the conquest.

During his episcopate, he prioritised peaceful relations with his neighbors, as can be appreciated from charter evidence linking him to Rotrou I, Viscount of Châteaudun, and his presence in the courts of the Norman dukes, Angevin counts and French kings. His relatively peaceful episcopate allowed him to consolidate a strong cathedral chapter, including at least five archdeacons, a cathedral custos, a chaplain and a magister scholarum (so the existence of an episcopal school is very likely). There was also a building program that included the beginning of a new cathedral and a motte in the south of the city. Moreover, two important monasteries were established during his pontificate (Saint Evroul and Almenêches), although without his initiative.

Orderic Vitalis, usually quite hostile to the House of Bellême, presents a very positive assessment of Ivo: learned and spiritual, shrewd, eloquent and peace-loving. As a modern author has written, he was one of the last "old-fashioned" bishops, heavily involved in secular affairs, and in that respect close to Odo of Bayeux and Geoffrey de Montbray.

== Sources ==
- Allen, Richard (2009). The Norman Episcopate, 989–1110. Ph.D. Thesis University of Glasgow.
- Louise, Gerard (1990). La seigneurie de Bellême, Xe–XIIe siècles. Dévolution des pouvoirs territoriaux et construction d'une seigneurie de frontière aux confins de la Normandie et du Maine à la charnière de l'an mil. Pays Bas-Normand 199–200 and 201–202.
- Guillot, Olivier (1972). Le comte d'Anjou et son entourage au XIe siecle. Picard.
- Neveux, Francois (1998). La Normandie, des ducs aux rois (Xe–XIIe siecle). Rennes, Ouest-France Université.
