= Richard III of Gaeta =

Richard III (Note: He may be numbered Richard II if Prince Richard I of Capua, who conquered Gaeta and took the ducal title in 1062, is not counted.) (died 1140/1), also known as Richard of Caleno, was the Norman count of Carinola and last quasi-independent Duke of Gaeta, ruling from 1121 to his death. From 1113, he was regent of Gaeta for his cousin or nephew, Duke Jonathan; in 1121 he succeeded him. As duke he was a nominal vassal of the Princes of Capua, to whom he was related.

== Family ==
Richard was the son of Count Bartholomew of Carinola, as attested by Peter the Deacon, who calls him Bartholomei de Caleno filius in his Chronicon Cassinense. Richard himself refers to his father in the grandiose title he used in charters in November 1123 and November 1127: "Richard, ordained by divine clemency consul and duke of the aforesaid city [of Gaeta], son of Lord Bartholomew of old, descended from the princes of Capua and the counts of Carinola of pious memory."

Bartholomew was a brother of Prince Jordan I of Capua and Count Jonathan I of Carinola. Richard was thus a member of the extended Drengot family. Duke Jonathan, who preceded Richard at Gaeta, may have been the son of Count Jonathan. Graham Loud presents an alternate genealogy, making Richard a son of Count Jonathan and Duke Jonathan his nephew, being a son of an unnamed brother of Richard.

Richard was married to a woman named Anna. Their son, Jonathan (died 1162×66), inherited the county of Carinola and was compensated for the loss of Gaeta, which passed to the crown after Richard's death, by the grant of the county of Conza.

== Securing Gaeta ==
According to Peter the Deacon, after the death of Duke Richard II in 1111, his widow, Rangarda, fought Count Richard of Carinola "for [control of] the duchy of Gaeta" (pro ducatu Cagetano). Peter never refers to Richard of Carinola as duke of Gaeta, preferring to call him simply the "lord of Carinola" (dominus Caleni). After the death of Richard II's heir in 1113, Jonathan was installed as duke, with Richard as regent, by Prince Robert I of Capua. Jonathan is known from the Codex Caietanus to have been in the fourth year of his minority in 1116 and the seventh of his rule in 1119. As a sign of Gaeta's independence, between March or May 1113 and July 1114 he and Richard issued charters dated to the joint reign of the Byzantine emperors Alexios I (1081–1118) and John II (1092–1143). In 1114 Richard confirmed the abbey of Montecassino in its possessions in Fondi, Ceccano, Aquino, Venafro, Alife and Teano. In 1115 Rangarda seized the tower and other possessions of the abbey at Suio in retaliation for the imprisonment of her second husband, Alexander, count of Sessa Aurunca. By 1117 Richard had helped restore to it its estates. In March 1118, when the Emperor Henry V installed an antipope, Gregory VIII in Rome, the legitimate Pope Gelasius II fled to his home town of Gaeta. Though he was a monk and a deacon, he had never been ordained or consecrated a priest. At Gaeta his ordination and consecration took place on 9–10 March, according to the Liber pontificalis (the official papal history), in the presence of Duke Richard (regent for Jonathan), Duke William II of Apulia and Prince Robert I of Capua. These three then swore homage to the pope.

In 1121, shortly after becoming duke, Richard confirmed the property of Campus Pedeacetu, a member of one of Gaeta's leading families. In 1123 Richard, at the request of the people, swore before the consuls and "great men" (maiores) not to alter the copper follari minted in Gaeta: "the aforesaid money, which it will now be seen are follari, therefore we ordain to remain at all times inviolate and unchanging". These coins circulated only locally and were retained even under the kings of Sicily down to 1194×97. Richard had introduced new coin types while serving as regent for Jonathan. Follari bearing the inscriptions RIC CON ET DUX and †GAETA followed by either II or III are usually attributed to Dukes Richard II and Richard III, respectively, although neither duke used any numerals in their charters. This act of 1123 also presents the first appearance of consuls in Gaeta. The consuls—usually four in number, serving for terms—were a distinguishing feature of Richard's rule, and re-appeared after his death. As can be seen from his coins, Richard generally used the title Consul et Dux (consul and duke). In 1127 the building that housed the curia (court) he ceded to the consuls.

== Dispute with Montecassino ==
According to Peter the Deacon, in 1124, Richard Pignardus was "enticed by the promises" (promissionibus illectus) of Richard of Gaeta to imprison Leo, a consul of Fondi, and his son Peter. Abbot Oderisius II of Montecassino, with the approval of Pope Calixtus II, then seized Pignardus' castle at Pico. This prompted Duke Richard to request aid from his lord and cousin, Prince Jordan II of Capua, who immediately invaded the Terra Sancti Benedicti, the lands of Montecassino. Only the intervention of the pope, who confirmed Oderisius in his possession of Pico, and a payment of 300 pounds of gold by the abbot to the prince stopped Jordan from taking the castle back by force. Peter adds that Duke William of Apulia refused to intervene in the conflict.

The deposition of Oderisius II in 1126 caused a scramble among the enemies of Montecassino to seize territory from the Terra Sancti Benedicti. Richard preceded the rush. In 1125, according to Peter the Deacon, he sacked the towns of Sant'Ambrogio, La Giuntura, Santo Stefano, San Giorgio and Sant'Apollinare. In 1127 Richard sent Adenulf, count of Spinium, to seize Castelnuovo Parano. This was then traded back to the abbey in exchange for the castle of Pico. In 1127, Richard plundered the priory of Sanctus Nicolaus de Pica (near modern Pico), a dependency of Montecassino. The prior of Sanctus Nicolaus, Seniorectus, was shortly to be elected abbot of Montecassino later that year. In February–March 1128, Richard was in Capua visiting the court of his relative, Prince Robert II. On 4 February he was the first listed witness to the oath Robert swore to Abbot Seniorectus to respect the possessions of Montecassino within his domains. In March, crediting Richard and another baron, Rainald Lopinus, for the idea, Robert ceded 300 tarì in annual income from Casa Genzana to Montecassino.

== Final years ==
In 1129 Richard signed a treaty of peace and alliance with the Duchy of Naples. In 1134 he signed a treaty with the lord of Monte Circeo directed against the citizens of Terracina. That year he also restored property that had been taken from a church in the city. By 1137 Richard seems to have submitted to King Roger II of Sicily, and there is no record of Gaeta's ruling consuls after 1135. In fact, there is no charter of Richard as duke of Gaeta after May 1135 either, but he lived on until 1140 or 1141 at least, apparently still ruling. In 1137 the Republic of Pisa addressed a letter to the consuls of Gaeta urging them not to attack Naples, which only makes sense if the peace with Naples had broken down and Richard had aligned himself with Roger. In 1137 Richard sided with the Emperor Lothair II when the latter invaded southern Italy. In 1140 some Gaetan ships made a raid on the Genoese coast, but that year the duke was compelled to do liege homage and swear an oath of fealty (legium hominium et ligiam fedelitatem) not only to King Roger, but also to his sons Duke Roger III of Apulia and the recently installed Prince Alfonso of Capua. Thereafter, Richard was a vassal of the king. When he died, his duchy passed to the crown and was gradually integrated into the kingdom as a royal city.

== Sources ==
- Bloch, Herbert (1986). Monte Cassino in the Middle Ages. Volume I (Parts I–III). Cambridge, MA: Harvard University Press.
- Chalandon, Ferdinand (1907). Histoire de la domination normande en Italie et en Sicile. 2 vols. Paris: A. Picard et fils.
- Grierson, Philip; Blackburn, Mark A. S.; Travaini, Lucia (1998). Medieval European Coinage. Vol. 14: Italy (III) (South Italy, Sicily, Sardinia). Cambridge: Cambridge University Press. ISBN 0-521-58231-8.
- Falkenhausen, Vera von (1989). "Dell'Aquila, Riccardo". Dizionario Biografico degli Italiani. Vol. 37. Rome: Istituto dell'Enciclopedia Italian.
- Houben, Hubert (2002). Roger II of Sicily: A Ruler Between East and West. Cambridge: Cambridge University Press.
- Loud, G. A. (1981). "A Calendar of the Diplomas of the Norman Princes of Capua". Papers of the British School at Rome. 49: 99–143. doi:10.1017/s0068246200008503. S2CID 163066985.
- Loud, G. A. (1996). "Continuity and Change in Norman Italy: The Campania in the Eleventh and Twelfth Centuries". Journal of Medieval History. 22 (4): 313–43. doi:10.1016/s0304-4181(96)00021-8.
- Oldfield, Paul (2009). City and Community in Norman Italy. Cambridge: Cambridge University Press.
- Skinner, Patricia (1995a). Family Power in Southern Italy: The Duchy of Gaeta and its Neighbours, 850–1139. Cambridge: Cambridge University Press.
- Skinner, Patricia (1995b). "Politics and Piracy: The Duchy of Gaeta in the Twelfth Century". Journal of Medieval History. 21 (4): 307–19. doi:10.1016/0304-4181(95)00773-3.
- Skinner, Patricia (2002). "The Tyrrhenian Coastal Cities under the Normans". In Loud, G. A.; Metcalfe, A. (eds.). The Society of Norman Italy. Leiden: Brill. pp. 75–96.

Preceded by Jonathan	Duke of Gaeta; 1121–1135×41	Succeeded by Crown
