= Jonathan of Gaeta =

Jonathan (or Jonathas, Italian Gionata; died July 1121), a member of a cadet branch of the Drengot family, was the duke of Gaeta from 1113 until his death. He is known from the Codex Caietanus to have been in the fourth year of his minority in 1116 and the seventh of his rule in 1119. (Note: Skinner 1995, p. 159, places the start of his reign in 1112 on the basis of this document.) There are three theories of his paternity. He may have been the son of Count Jonathan I of Carinola or his grandson by an unnamed son, or else the grandson of Count Bartholomew of Carinola. He was under the regency of his cousin or uncle, Count Richard of Carinola.

After the death of Duke Andrew of Gaeta without heirs in 1113, the duchy escheated to Prince Robert I of Capua, who bestowed it on Jonathan and appointed Richard his regent. As a sign of Gaeta's semi-independence, between March (Note: Bloch 1986, p. 398, says May.) 1113 and July 1114 he and Richard issued charters dated to the joint-reign (1092–1118) of the Byzantine emperors Alexios I and John II. The succession of Jonathan was not without incident. The widow of Duke Richard II tried with her new husband to seize the duchy, but Richard of Carinola succeeded in getting control of it after a short war.

There are no Gaetan follari (copper coins) definitively attributable to the reign of Jonathan. Specimens with the inscriptions IOAN and IOHS DVX may belong to him, but are more usually ascribed to John IV (991–1012).

== Sources ==
- Bloch, Herbert (1986). Monte Cassino in the Middle Ages. Volume I (Parts I–III). Cambridge, MA: Harvard University Press.
- Chalandon, Ferdinand (1907). Histoire de la domination normande en Italie et en Sicile. 2 vols. Paris: A. Picard et fils.
- Falkenhausen, Vera von (1989). "Dell'Aquila, Riccardo". Dizionario Biografico degli Italiani (in Italian). Vol. 37: Della Fratta–Della Volpaia. Rome: Institute of the Italian Encyclopaedia. ISBN 978-88-12-00032-6.
- Federici, Giovannia Battista (1791). Degli antichi duchi e consoli o ipati della città di Gaeta. Naples.
- Grierson, Philip; Blackburn, Mark A. S.; Travaini, Lucia (1998). Medieval European Coinage. Vol. 14: Italy (III) (South Italy, Sicily, Sardinia). Cambridge: Cambridge University Press.
- Loud, G. A. (1996). "Continuity and Change in Norman Italy: The Campania in the Eleventh and Twelfth Centuries". Journal of Medieval History. 22: 313–43. doi:10.1016/s0304-4181(96)00021-8.
- Skinner, Patricia (1995). Family Power in Southern Italy: The Duchy of Gaeta and its Neighbours, 850–1139. Cambridge: Cambridge University Press.

| Preceded by Andrew | Duke of Gaeta; 1113–1121 | Succeeded by Richard III |
