= List of dukes of Gaeta =

This is a list of the hypati, patricians, consuls, and dukes of Gaeta. Many of the dates are uncertain and sometimes the status of the rulership, with co-rulers and suzerain–vassal relations, is vague.

== Native rule (839–1032) ==
=== Anatolian dynasty ===
- Constantine (839–866)
- Marinus I (839–866)

=== Docibilan dynasty ===
- Docibilis I (866-906)
- John I (867–933 or 934), also patrician from 915
- Docibilis II (914 or 915–954), co–hypatus from 906
- John II (954–962 or 963), co–duke from 933 or 934, consul
- Gregory (962 or 963–978)
- Marinus II (978–984)
- John III (984–1008), co–duke from 979
- John IV (1008–1012), co–duke from 991
- John V (1012–1032), also consul
  - Emilia, grandmother, regent (1012–1027)
  - Leo I, uncle, regent (1017–1023)

== Lombard period (1032–1064) ==
In 1041, Guaimar gave direct control and his title to the count of Aversa. In 1058, Gaeta was made subject to the count of Aversa, by then prince of Capua.

- Pandulf I (1032–1038)
- Pandulf II (1032–1038), co–duke
- Leo II (1042), a member of the Docibilan family
- Guaimar (1042–1045)
  - Ranulf (1042–1045)
  - Asclettin (1045)
- Atenulf I (1045–1062), also count of Aquino
- Atenulf II (1062–1064), also count of Aquino
  - Maria, regent (1062–1065), daughter of Pandulf I, wife of Atenulf I and William I, and mother of Atenulf II and Lando

== Norman period (1064–1140) ==
These were vassals of the princes of Capua. Princes Richard I and his son Jordan I used the titles duke and consul from 1058 and 1062 respectively.

- William I (1064)
- Lando (1064–1065), also count of Traietto
- Dannibaldo (1066–1067)
- Geoffrey (1068–1086)
- Reginald (from 1086)
- Gualganus (until 1091)
- Landulf (1091–1103)
- William II (1103–1104 or 1105)
- Richard II (1104 or 1105–1111)
- Andrew (1111–1112)
- Jonathan (1112–1121)
- Richard III (1121–1140)

In 1140, Gaeta went directly to the king of Sicily, Roger II. Under the Hautevilles and the Hohenstaufen, sovereigns continued issuing coinage as rulers of Gaeta until 1229.

== Victory titles in the 19th century ==
- Michel Gaudin (1756–1841) was created Duc de Gaëte in the French Empire by Napoleon Bonaparte
- Enrico Cialdini (1811–1892) was created Duca di Gaeta in the Kingdom of Italy by Victor Emanuel II
