= Atenulf I of Gaeta =

Atenulf I (died 2 February 1062) was the Lombard count of Aquino who rose to become Duke of Gaeta in Southern Italy during the chaotic middle of the eleventh century.

Atenulf married the senatrix Maria, daughter of Pandulf IV of Capua, and his brother Lando married another daughter of Pandulf. After the death of Ranulf Drengot, Count of Aversa, in June 1045, his cousin Asclettin succeeded in Aversa, but the Gaetans elected the Lombard Atenulf as their duke. Guaimar IV of Salerno, the suzerain of both Aversa and Gaeta, intervened on Asclettin's behalf and he defeated Atenulf in battle and took him prisoner. At this time, however, Pandulf, the natural ally of Atenulf, was assaulting the lands of the abbey of Monte Cassino with Lando. Lando captured the abbot Richer and in return for the abbot's freedom and his assistance in battling Pandulf, Atenulf was freed and recognised in possession of Gaeta.

In Fall 1058, Atenulf's eldest son, who was betrothed to a daughter of Richard I of Capua, died. Richard demanded the dower nevertheless. The duke refused and consequently Richard besieged and took Aquino, one of the few feudatories of Gaeta remaining. Desiderius of Benevento, the new abbot of Montecassino, convinced Richard to extort only 400 sous from the duke, however.

Atenulf died in 1062 and was succeeded by his second son, Atenulf II. Aquino was ruled by all four of his sons: Atenulf, Lando, Pandulf, and Landulf.

== Sources ==
- Norwich, John Julius. The Normans in the South 1016–1130. Longmans: London, 1967.
- Chalandon, Ferdinand. Histoire de la domination normande en Italie et en Sicilie. Paris, 1907.

Preceded by Asclettin	Duke of Gaeta; 1045–1062	Succeeded by Atenulf II
