= Gualganus Ridel =

Gualganus (Italian Gualgano), surnamed Ridel (Latin Ridellus, Italian Ridello), was the third and last Count (or Lord) of Pontecorvo and Duke of Gaeta of the Norman Ridel family from about 1091 until about 1103. He was a son and successor of Duke Raynald Ridel, but his rule in Gaeta was not unopposed.

After the death of Prince Jordan I of Capua, the suzerain of Gaeta, the Capuans and Gaetans rose in rebellion. Jordan's successor, Prince Richard II, was forced to abandon Capua for the family stronghold of Aversa, while Duke Raynald of Gaeta had to flee Gaeta for his family's rural stronghold at Pontecorvo.

In 1092 or 1093, a man of obscure background, Landulf, was installed as duke in Gaeta. After Raynald's death, Gualganus continued to claim Gaeta from the castle of Pontecorvo until his death, around 1103 or shortly after. He may have retaken control of it at some point.

Shortly before 1100, Gualganus married Marotta, a daughter of Count Ranulf I of Caiazzo and his wife, Sibylla. They had no children and with Gualganus' death the Italian branch of the Ridels went extinct. Gaeta is next found in the hands of another Norman, William de Blosseville, who may have ousted Gualganus rather than wait for his death. Pontecorvo passed to his widow, sister of Count Robert of Caiazzo and cousin of Prince Richard II. She allegedly conspired with Richard's enemies and so he confiscated Pontecorvo and bestowed it on her brother, who then partially gifted and partially sold it to the Abbey of Monte Cassino on 13 January 1105 in a charter drawn up at Caiazzo.

== Sources ==
- Bloch, Herbert (1986). Monte Cassino in the Middle Ages. Volume I (Parts I–II). Cambridge, MA: Harvard University Press.
- Falkenhausen, Vera von (1989). "Dell'Aquila, Riccardo". Dizionario Biografico degli Italiani. Vol. 37. Rome: Istituto dell'Enciclopedia Italian.
- Gambella, Angelo (2007). Medioevo Alifano: Potere e popolo nello stato normanno di Alife. Rome: Drengo.
- Loud, Graham A. (1981). "How 'Norman' was the Norman Conquest of Southern Italy?". Nottingham Medieval Studies. 25 (13): 13–34. doi:10.1484/J.NMS.3.96.
- Loud, Graham A. (1985). Church and Society in the Norman Principality of Capua, 1058–1197. Oxford: Clarendon Press.
- Loud, Graham A. (2000). "The Norman Counts of Caiazzo and the Abbey of Montecassino". Montecassino and Benevento in the Middle Ages: Essays in South Italian Church History. Aldershot: Ashgate. pp. 199–217.
- Skinner, Patricia (1995). Family Power in Southern Italy: The Duchy of Gaeta and its Neighbours, 850–1139. Cambridge: Cambridge University Press.

Preceded by Raynald	Duke of Gaeta c.1091 – c.1103	Succeeded by Landulf; William
