= Giroie, Lord of Échauffour =

Medieval Breton knight

- Died: 1033; Normandy
- Noble family: Giroie
- Spouse: Gisle of Montfort-sur-Risle
- Father: Arnold-le-Gros, of Courcerault

Giroie (Latin: Geroianus, a.k.a. Géré) († 1033), Lord of Echauffour and Montreuil-l'Argillé, was a knight from Brittany who became a Norman nobleman and the progenitor of a large family in Normandy, England, and Apulia.

== Career ==
Giroie was the son of Arnold-le-Gros, of Courcerault, who was in turn the son of Abbo the Breton. Giroie's arrival in Normandy from Brittany did not apparently raise concerns with Richard II, Duke of Normandy, but was challenged by Gilbert, Count of Brionne whose lands nearby were threatened by the newcomer and his followers. Duke Richard intervened only to maintain the peace in the area and not to repel the newly settled Giroie.

Giroie was a formidable knight and a vassal of William of Bellême. In battle against Herbert I, Count of Maine, William and his followers were overwhelmed and fled the battlefield, but Giroie and his small force held their ground and defeated Herbert's forces completely. It was a famous victory at the time and Heugon, a powerful Norman, offered Giroie his only daughter in marriage along with the lordships of Montreuil, Echauffour and all adjoining lands. Heugon's daughter died before the wedding could take place. William de Bellême then introduced Giroie to Richard II, Duke of Normandy at Rouen, (Note: For a continuation of the relations between the families of Giroie and de Bellême, see the article William I Talvas.) who, in recognition of his great accomplishments granted the lands of Heugon to Giroie. On returning from Rouen, Giroie then married Gisle, daughter of Thurston de Bastembourg, lord of Montfort-sur-Risle. He and several of his relatives were vassals of the de Belléme family.

After succeeding to the lands of Heugon, Giroie discovered the ecclesiastical houses in his domain were under no bishopric. He further inquired to find the most devout of the bishops surrounding his lands and found that to be Roger, Bishop of Lisieux. Giroie then convinced several of his neighbors including Baldric de Bauquencei and his sons-in-law Wascelin du Pont-Echanfré and Roger de Merlerault to place their religious houses under the same bishopric. They approached Roger, Bishop of Lisieux who granted their requests and further granted the clergy of these churches an exemption from any and all archdeacon's visitations. This same privilege was enforced after Giroie's death by his son William.

Giroie, from his own funds, erected six churches, two of which were at Verneuces, one dedicated to St. Mary, mother of God, and the other to St. Paul, "doctor of the gentiles". The third, in a vill called Glos, in the Arrondissement of Lisieux. Giroie died in 1033. After his death, and only two of his sons being of age his lands were attacked again by Gilbert of Brionne, seeking an easy victory and wanting to add these lands to those of his own. The two sons, gathering up all their kinsmen and vassals, soundly defeated Gilbert's forces. By way of revenge the family of Giroie then took Sap by force. At this point Robert I, Duke of Normandy stepped in and commending the brothers, knighting both of them, he caused Gilbert to cede Sap to them and implored all parties to end their war.

== Family ==
By Gisle Giroie had seven sons and four daughters:

- Arnold d'Echauffour
- William fitz Giroie, was mutilated and blinded by William I Talvas; he was the father of William of Montreuil
- Fulk fitz Giroie
- Robert fitz Giroie, Lord of Saint-Céneri-le-Gérei. His son Robert Giroie held the castle of Saint Ceneri against Henry I in 1118
- Ralph 'Ill-tonsured', a monk at Marmoutier Abbey, Tours
- Hugh fitz Giroie, died young
- Giroie fitz Giroie, died young
- Heremburge, married Wascelin du Pont-Echanfré. Her two sons, William and Ralph, were firm adherents of Robert Guiscard, Duke of Calabria
- Hawise de Echauffour, wife of Robert de Grandmesnil, and secondly of William d'Évreux, being mother of, with others, Hugh and Robert de Grandmesnil and Judith d'Évreux
- Emma, married Robert Melrant
- Adela, who married Solomon de Sable

His sister Hildegarde had three sons and eleven daughters, who being married to notable men all had sons who played important parts in the wars in France, England, and Apulia. (Note: Several key descendants are listed in: Daniel Power, The Norman frontier in the twelfth and early thirteenth centuries (New York: Cambridge University Press, 2004), p. 515.)
