= Robert de Grandmesnil =

11th-century Norman nobleman and bishop

- Died: c. 1082
- Parent(s): Robert I de Grantmesnil; Hawisa d'Échauffour
- Church: church of Saint-Michael of Mileto church of Saint-Mary, Mother of God
- Congregations served: abbey of Saint-Evroul abbey of Sant'Eufemia (Lametia) abbey of Venosa; Bishopric of Troina
- Offices held: Abbot; Bishop

Robert de Grantmesnil (de Grandmesnil) also known as Robert II, was a Norman nobleman; a member of a prominent Norman family. He first became a monk, then abbot at the Abbey of Saint-Evroul in Normandy and later Bishop of Troina in the Norman Kingdom of Sicily.

== Career ==
Robert was the second son of Robert I de Grantmesnil and Hawisa d'Échauffour, daughter of Giroie, Lord of Échauffour. His family was from Calvados, arrondissement of Lisieux, in the canton of Saint-Pierre-sur-Dives. As a child he applied himself to learning and came to be known for his retentive memory and seemed to be destined for the church. But Robert also had a love of arms and fighting and was for five years an esquire to Duke William, who at the end of that period knighted him and rewarded him generously for his service. In 1040 when Robert I died, his three sons, including Robert, all shared in their father's inheritance.

In 1050, Robert and his elder brother Hugh de Grandmesnil had decided to found a monastery and asked their uncle, William fitz Giroie, (Note: This is the same William fitz Giroie who was mutilated and blinded by William I Talvas, apparently out of jealousy. It was for this crime William I Talvas and his daughter Mabel de Bellême were driven from their lands and eventually taken in by Roger de Montgomery. So William was blind by the time he assisted his nephews in reestablishing the abbey of Saint-Evroul. After his ordeal he had become a monk at the abbey of Bec and was probably involved in the exchange of lands for his nephews to acquire the lands used for the abbey. See: "The Gesta Normannorum Ducum of William of Jumièges, Orderic Vitalis, and Robert of Torigni", Vol. II, Ed. & Trans. Elisabeth M.C. Van Houts (The Clarendon Press, Oxford & New York, 1995), pp. 110–12) to advise them. William pointed out that the site the two chose was unsuitable and also advised them to restore the ancient abbey of Saint-Evroul instead. The brothers agreed and compensated the monks of Bec who owned the old ruins and then generously funded, along with contributions from their mother's fitz Giroie family, the restoration of the abbey. In his confirmation charter to this refounding of Saint-Evroul, Duke William subscribed it with the sign of the cross and had added to the charter a warning against anyone doing any harm to the abbey or any of its members under pain of excommunication. That same year Robert entered the abbey as a monk and became abbot there in 1059.

=== Troubles at Saint-Evroul ===
About 1059 there were several quarrels between Duke William's barons, in particular members of the Giroie family and Mabel de Belleme. In one instance she and her husband Roger convinced Duke William to confiscate the lands of Arnold d'Échauffour (Robert's uncle), and turn them over to her. Also caught up in this and having his lands suddenly taken was Hugh de Grandmesnil (Robert's brother). At the same time Robert de Grandmesnil, as abbot of Saint-Evroul, was summoned before the duke to answer charges. Upon learning these were false and discovering the duke had intentions of harming him, Robert consulted Bishop Hugh of Lisieux. The bishop advised Robert to guard against William's wrath and for his own safety he should remove himself from Normandy. Duke William then had Osbern, a monk of the Holy Trinity, Rouen, installed as abbot of Saint-Evroul in Robert's place.

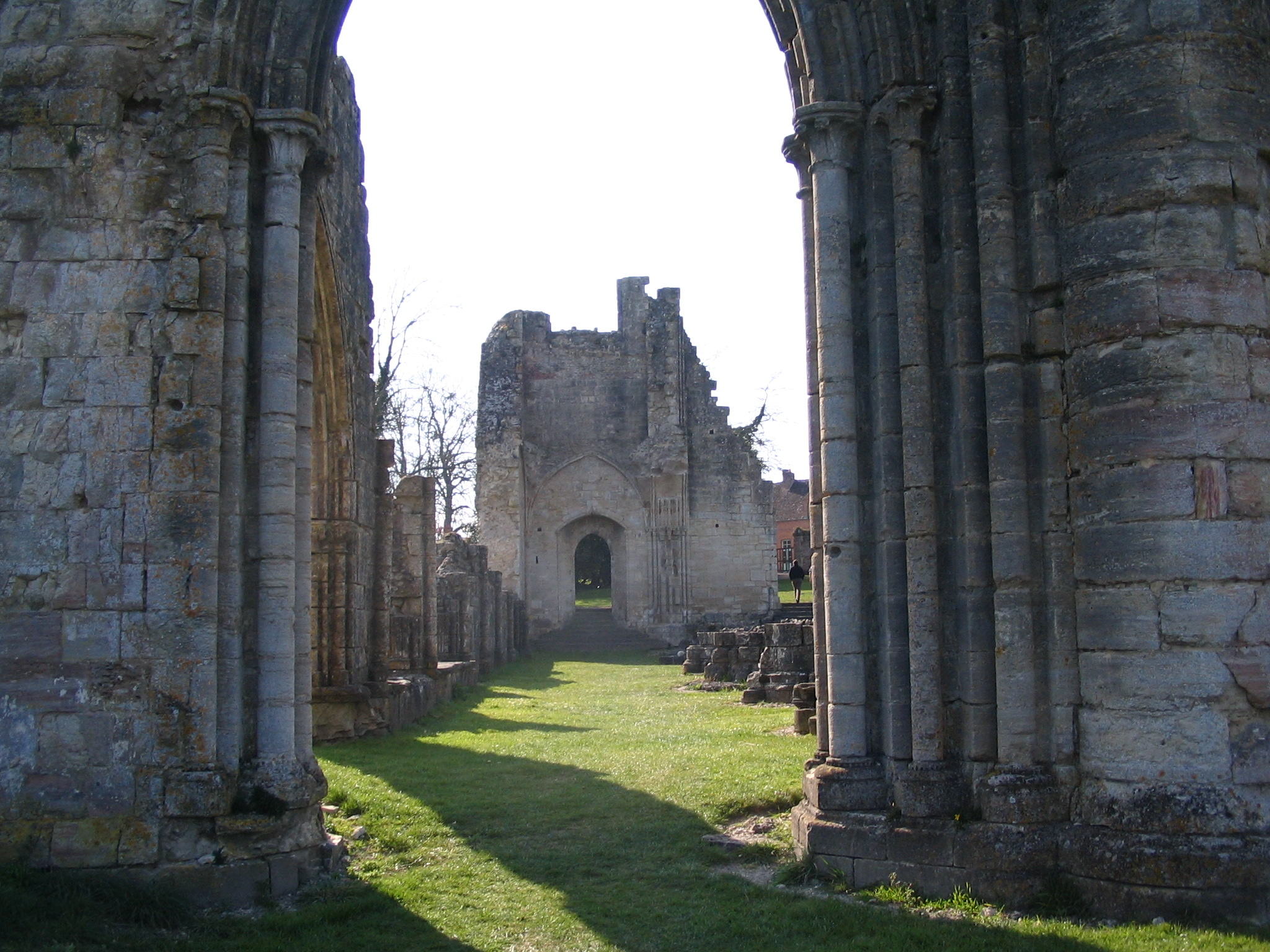
Ruins of the Abbey of Saint-Evroul

Robert then went to Italy to gain audience with Pope Nicholas II. Explaining his position in Normandy had become untenable, that he had been falsely accused, and that no ecclesiastical court had been convened, he asked the pope for his help. Nicholas agreed and sent Robert back to Normandy armed with apostolic letters accompanied by two cardinal's clerks to reestablish Robert as abbot and punish Osbern as an intruder. Hearing that a papal commission that included Robert was approaching, Duke William became enraged and stated he would accept the papal envoys "but if any monk brought charges against him, he would hang him with contempt on the highest tree in the neighboring forest." Bishop Hugh warned Robert not to come into Normandy and Robert stopped at Saint-Denis Abbey near Paris and was received by his cousin Hugh, the Abbot there. Robert then sent a summons to Abbot Osbern at Saint-Evroul that both of them should appear before the Cardinals at Chartres and abide by their judgment. Osbern agreed but at the appointed time and place he did not appear. Robert then sent Osbern letters on the Pope's authority excommunicating him. The monks of Saint-Evroul on being notified of Osbern being judged an intruder and being excommunicated, left to join their lawful abbot Robert. Those too young or too old to travel remained behind.

=== Sicily and southern Italy ===
Robert removed himself again to Italy in 1061. He brought with him a total of eleven monks from Saint-Evroul, and all were well received by Pope Alexander II, who had just succeeded Pope Nicholas II, and who, after hearing of their troubles in Normandy, gave Robert and his monks the temporary use of the church of Saint-Paul the Apostle in Rome. To find a more permanent situation Robert sought help from his cousin, William of Montreuil, (Note: William of Montreuil was the son of William fitz Giroie, Robert's uncle, who had advised and helped with the refounding of Saint-Evroul.) then in the service of Pope Alexander II, who gave Robert and his monks half the town of Aquino. He also sought help from Richard I of Capua, Prince of Capua who, as it turned out, made Robert many empty promises. In disgust Robert turned to Robert Guiscard, Duke of Calabria, who treated the abbot with great respect and invited him and his monks to settle in Calabria. In c. 1061-2 Robert founded the abbey of Sant'Eufemia Lamezia in Calabria and in 1062 Guiscard also granted him the abbey of Venosa. In 1080 the duke then granted him the church of Saint-Michael of Mileto. The same year Roger I Duke of Apulia selected Robert as Bishop of Troina. Robert died on November 21, c. 1082 and was interred in his church of Saint-Mary, Mother of God, which he built.

== Family ==
Robert was a member of the de Grandmesnil family and also identified closely with his mother's Giroie family of Échauffour and Montreuil-l'Argillé, members of which family were vassals as well as rivals of the de Bellême family. Robert's mother eventually retired to become a nun at Montivilliers along with two of Robert's sisters, their brother Hugh providing for them. Hugh, who left Normandy with Robert, returned in time to accompany William the Conqueror at the Battle of Hastings, and subsequently was sheriff of Leicester and held sixty-seven manors at Domesday. Orderic Vitalis, himself a monk at Saint-Evroul, made no mention of Robert ever being married or of having any children.
