= William of Bellême =

Norman nobleman (d. 1028)

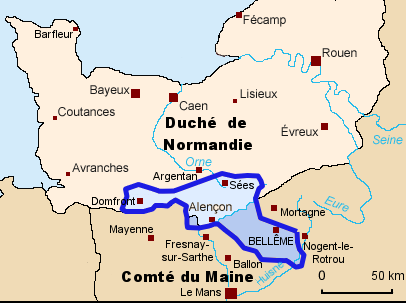
Map of the lands of Bellême

William of Bellême (960/5 – 1028) called William Princeps, was the Seigneur of Bellême and a member of the House of Bellême.

== Life ==
William was the son of Yves de Bellême and his wife Godeheut. Yves in turn was probably the son of Yves de Creil, magister balistarum (Latin meaning officer in charge of the royal siege train). (Note: When young Duke Richard I was being held a virtual prisoner by Louis IV, it was Ives de Criel who revealed the king's plot to kill or mutilate the boy to Osmund, the young Duke's tutor, who whisked Richard away from the king and saved him. See: Geoffrey H. White, 'The First House of Bellême', Transactions of the Royal Historical Society, Fourth Series, Vol. 22 (1940), p. 69)

With the consent of Richard I, Duke of Normandy William had constructed two castles, one at Alençon and the other at Domfront, while the caput of Yves' lordship was the castle of Bellême, constructed "a quarter of a league from the old dungeon of Bellême" in Maine. The first mention of William in any records was in 1000 as Marshall of the king's forces when he accompanied the King of France to Toulouse, the next mention being his succeeding his father in 1005. Also, in 1005 William along with his mother made several grants to local churches including the church of Boece, to which his father had founded in his castle of Bellême. Initially William attempted to revoke a gift of his father to Fleury Abbey but was so impressed with the abbot Gauzlin's appeal he restored the gift and also allowed his young son Benoit to become a monk there.

His brother Avesgaud, Bishop of Le Mans was engaged in constant warfare with Herbert I, Count of Maine. In 1020 Bishop Avesgaud fled to his brother's castle of Bellême after being driven out of his see by count Herbert, for which Avesgaud placed an interdict on Herbert and his lands and excommunicated the count. William joined forces with his brother Avesgaud attacking count Herbert at the castle of Ballon. At first William and Avesgaud were beaten back but Giroie (aka Géré), a vassal of William's, held his ground and defeated Herbert's forces completely. William de Bellême introduced Giroie to Duke Richard at Rouen who rewarded Giroie with the lands of Heugon. (Note: For a continuation of the relations between the families of Giroie and de Bellême, see the article William I Talvas.)

In 1027 when Robert I, Duke of Normandy succeeded his brother Richard III, William de Bellême revolted against him. Robert laid siege to his castle of Bellême until William surrendered then had to humbly ask for forgiveness (in bare feet with a saddle on his shoulders). Having been forgiven and his fief of Alençon restored, William sent his sons Fulk and Robert to harass the Normans, but they were defeated and Fulk was killed in battle at Blavon.

Neither William nor his father Ives ever attested any of their acts using the title comes (count), indicating they had feudal authority in their own territories but were not officially invested as counts.

== Family ==
William married Mathilde of Condé-sur-Noireau. The couple had six sons:

- Fulk, died in his father's lifetime.
- Warin, died in 1026 under mysterious circumstances. He married Melisende, Viscountess of Châteaudun; their daughter Adela married Rotrou, Count of Mortagne (whose grandson was Rotrou 'the Great', Count of Perche and Morgagne).
- Robert, succeeded his father as Seigneur de Bellême, murdered in prison.
- Ives, Seigneur de Bellême and Bishop of Sées
- William I Talvas held the honor of Bellême in right of his brother Ives.
- Benoit, a monk at Fleury Abbey.

His widow Mathilde along with her son William Talvas both confirmed and increased gifts of William de Bellême to the church of Bellême.

== Notes ==
Preceded by Yves de Bellême	Seigneur de Bellême; 1005–1028	Succeeded by William I Talvas
