= Perrières =

- Commune
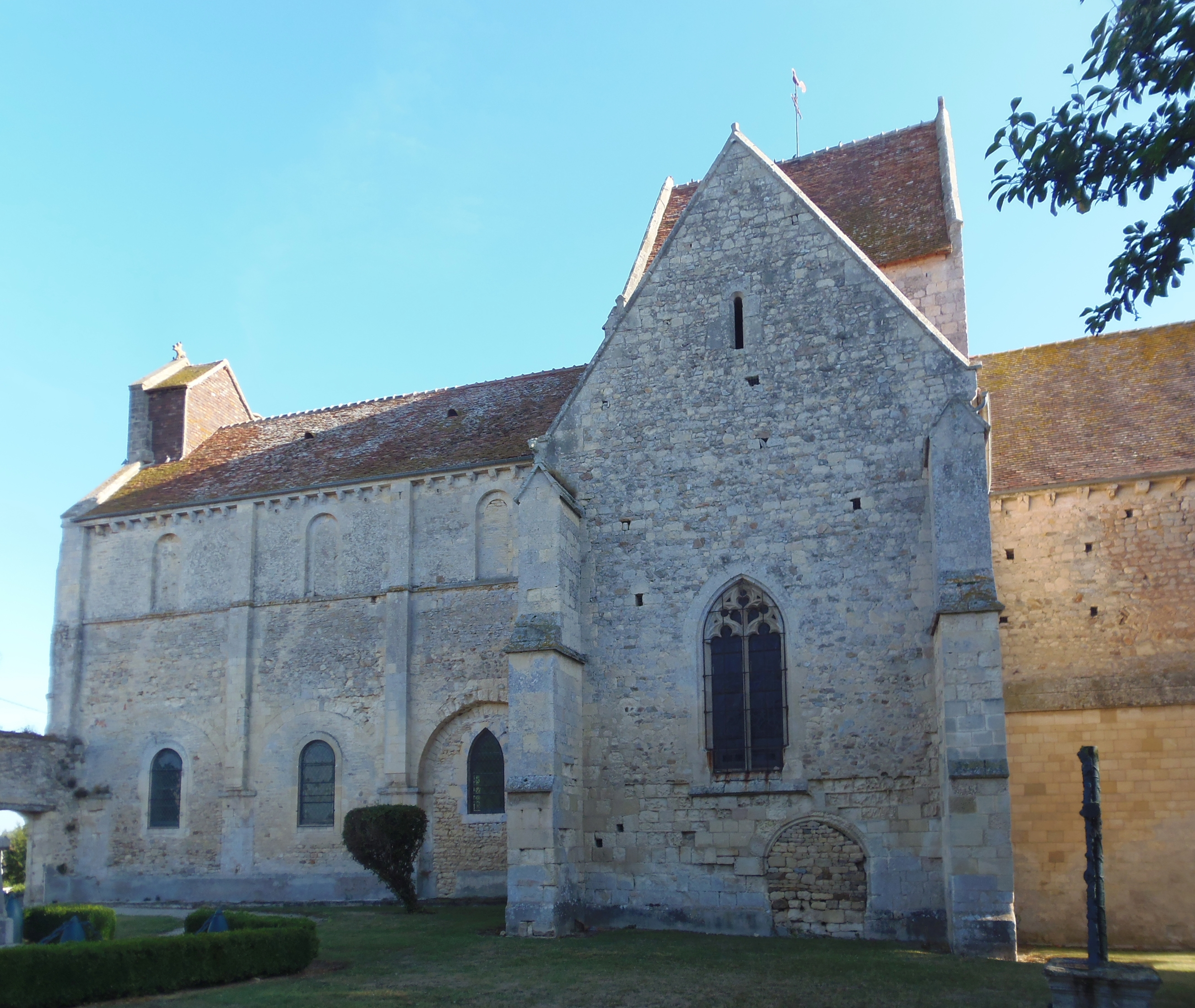
- The church in Perrières
- Location of Perrières
- Location within France Location within Normandy
- Coordinates: 48°57′36″N 0°08′06″W
- Country: France
- Region: Normandy
- Department: Calvados
- Arrondissement: Caen
- Canton: Falaise
- Intercommunality: Pays de Falaise

Government
  - Mayor (2020–2026): Gérard Chandon
- Area^{1}: 8.17 km^{2} (3.15 sq mi)
- Elevation: 74 m (243 ft)
- Highest elevation: 136 m (446 ft)
- Lowest elevation: 42 m (138 ft)
- Population (2023): 332
  - Density: 40.6/km^{2} (105/sq mi)
- Time zone: UTC+01:00 (CET)
  - Summer (DST): UTC+02:00 (CEST)
- INSEE/Postal code: 14497 /14170
- ^{1} French Land Register data, which excludes lakes, ponds, glaciers > 1 km^{2} (0.386 sq mi or 247 acres) and river estuaries.

Perrières (French pronunciation: [pɛʁjɛʁ]) is a commune in the Calvados department in the Normandy region in northwestern France.

== Geography ==
The river Perrières flows through the commune.

== History ==
Around 1075, the Lord of Courcy, Richard founded a priory under the protection of the Marmoutier Abbey close to Tours."Église Saint-Vigor". Recensement du patrimoine religieux. Observatoire du Patrimoine Religieux.

== Population ==
Historical population
Year	Pop.	±% p.a.
1968	378	—
1975	308	−2.88%
1982	269	−1.92%
1990	254	−0.71%
1999	252	−0.09%
2007	264	+0.58%
2012	321	+3.99%
2017	327	+0.37%
2023	332	+0.25%
Source: INSEE

== Points of Interest ==
=== National heritage sites ===
The commune has two sites listed as a Monument historique.

- Old tithe barn - a thirteenth century Tithe barn that was listed as a monument in 1947.
- Church - a twelfth century church built on the priory site created by Richard de Courcy, it was listed as a monument in 1928.

== See also ==
- Communes of the Calvados department
