= Geoffrey Ridel, Duke of Gaeta =

Geoffrey Ridel (or Ridell) (Italian: Goffredo Ridello) (died 1084) was the Duke of Gaeta as a vassal of the Prince of Capua from 1067 or 1068.

In 1061, he was one of the leaders of the first Norman campaign in Sicily. In 1067, he was appointed duke of Gaeta. He was the first Norman duke since William of Montreuil and the populace did not like him. Electing their own civil government, they expelled Geoffrey, who continued to rule the countryside as duke from his castle at Pontecorvo. Geoffrey was succeeded by his son Reginald. His daughter, Eva or Anna, married John VI of Naples.

== Sources ==
- Amatus of Montecassino. Ystoire de li Normant.
- Leo of Ostia and Peter the Deacon. Chronicon Monasterii Casinensis.
- Chalandon, Ferdinand. Histoire de la domination normande en Italie et en Sicilie. Paris, 1907.

Preceded by Danimbold	Duke of Gaeta; 1067–1084	Succeeded by Reginald
