= Atenulf II =

Atenulf II may refer to:

- Atenulf II of Benevento (died 940), Prince of Benevento and Capua
- Atenulf II of Gaeta (died 1064), Duke of Gaeta
