= William Talvas =

William Talvas may refer to three Franco-Norman magnates:

- William I Talvas (c. 995–after 1030), seigneur of Alençon
- William III of Ponthieu (c. 1095–1172), a.k.a. William II Talvas, son of Robert II of Bellême and Agnes of Ponthieu
- William IV of Ponthieu (1179 – 1221), William III Talvas, Count of Ponthieu and William IV of the house of Belleme/Montgomery
