= Atenulf I =

Atenulf I may refer to:

- Atenulf I of Capua (died 910), Prince of Benevento and Capua
- Atenulf I of Gaeta (died 1062), Duke of Gaeta
