= Maria of Gaeta =

Maria of Gaeta (born c. 1020) was an Italian regent, countess of Aquino by marriage and regent of the Duchy of Gaeta for her son in 1062–65.

She was daughter of Pandulf IV of Capua and Maria, was the wife (from before 1038) of Atenulf, count of Aquino, while her sister Sikelgaita was the wife of Atenulf's brother Lando. According to Amatus of Montecassino, Atenulf was consequently supported by Pandulf in taking the duchy of Gaeta from Asclettin, Count of Aversa, on the death of Ranulf Drengot in 1045.

Her eldest son was betrothed to a daughter of Richard I of Capua in 1058, but died before the marriage could take place. Richard extorted the morgengab anyway and Gaeta became a feudatory of Capua.

As senatrix and ducissa of Gaeta, Maria ruled as regent for her and Atenulf's son Atenulf II after her husband's death on 2 February 1062. On 1 June, a pact was confirmed between Maria and the counts of Traietto, Maranola, and Suio. The allies were excluded from forming any pact with the Normans and sworn to protect the territory of the Gaetan duchy. The treaty was finalised at Traietto and was to last for a year. The league was successful in preventing Richard of Capua from extending his conquests during the year. However, Richard skillfully negotiated to prevent a renewal of the pact and on 28 June 1063, he was in possession of Gaeta.

Maria allied with the counts of Traietto and Aquino, her sons Lando and the aforementioned Atenulf, and with William of Montreuil, who repudiated his wife in order to marry her, in late 1064. In February 1065, the revolted were put down by Richard of Capua and Maria and William were expelled from Gaeta. Richard offered to compensate her by marrying her to his son Jordan.

== Sources ==
- Chalandon, Ferdinand. Histoire de la domination normande en Italie et en Sicilie. Paris, 1907.
