= William fitz Giroie =

- Died: 1057; Gaeta, Italy
- Noble family: Giroie
- Spouses: Hiltrude de Beine; Emma de Tannei
- Father: Giroie, Lord of Échauffour
- Mother: Gisle

William fitz Giroie (died 1057), Lord of Échauffour and Montreuil-l'Argillé. A Norman nobleman and patriarch of a large and powerful family in Normandy and Apulia.

== Career ==
William was the second son of Giroie, Lord of Échauffour and Gisle, daughter of Thurston de Bastembourg lord of Montfort-sur-Risle. At their father's death in 1033, those properties making up his inheritance went to the eldest son Arnold, while most of the lands Giroie had acquired went to William. When Arnold died from an accidental fall in 1041, William was his heir and, less the smaller holdings that went to his two younger brothers, he inherited most of his father's lands. From that time on William was the family patriarch and according to Orderic Vitalis governed his family well. He headed a powerful family consisting of his brothers, sons, and numerous nephews all of whom were themselves formidable warriors.

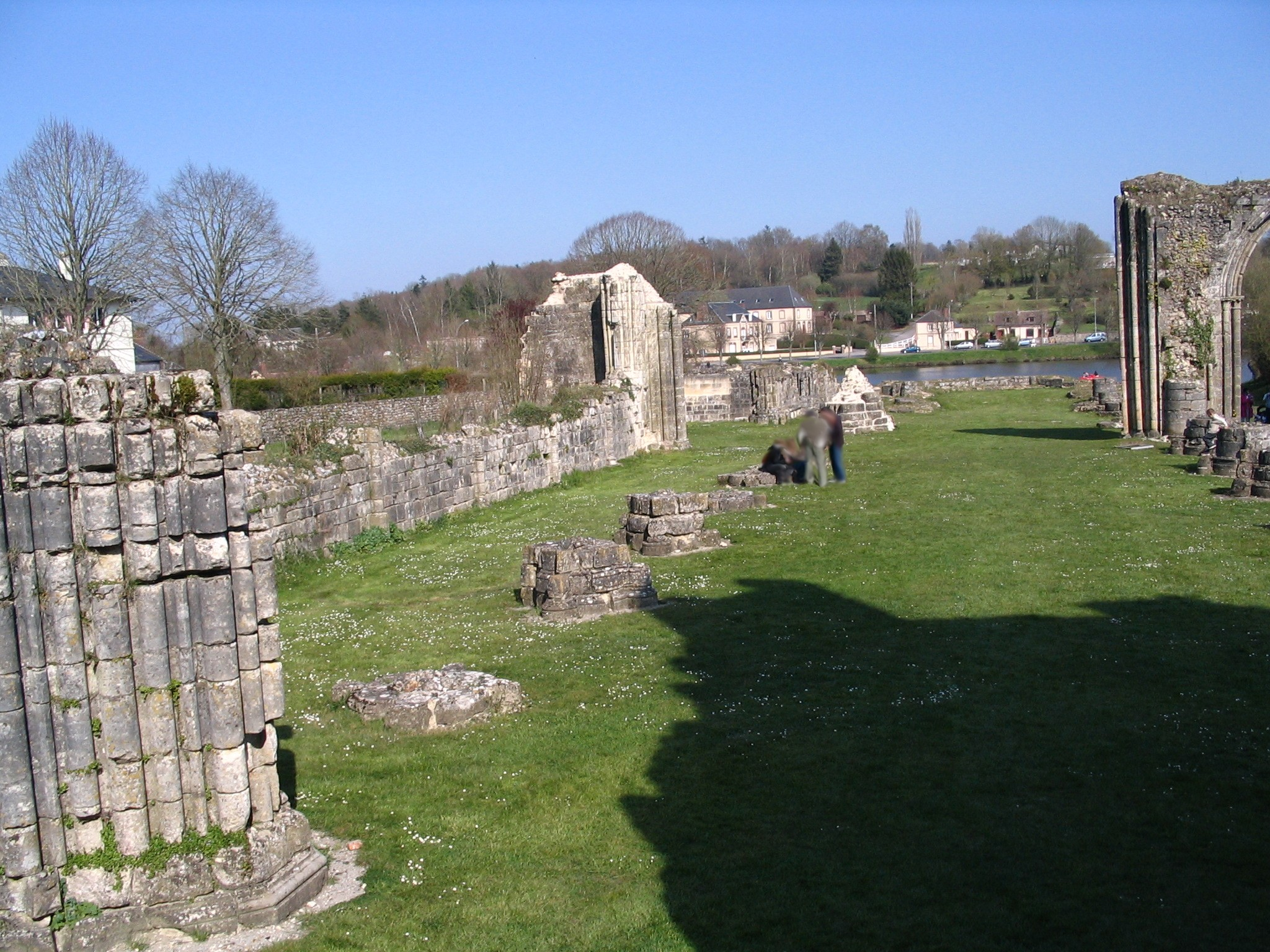
Ruins of the abbey of Saint Evroult

About 1050, William heard of an old fountain in the forest near a stream called Charenton and went to investigate. He discovered the ruins of an old church dedicated to St. Peter the apostle and surveyed the area for what became the restored Abbey of Saint-Evroul, so named for its original founder St. Evroul. (Note: Saint Ebrulf, a.k.a. Evroul, founded the church at this sight in the densely forested area of Ouche in Normandy. The first buildings were wattle huts but he eventually built a monastery on the spot. In all, with the support of Frankish noblemen, he was able to build and staff fifteen monasteries in the region. See: Alban Butler; Paul Burns, Butler's lives of the saints / December (Turnbridge Wells, UK: Burns & Oates, 2000), p. 230.) Shortly afterwards, his two nephews, Hugh de Grandmesnil and his younger brother Robert de Grandmesnil wanted to build a monastery but the site they chose was not well suited for a religious community. William advised his nephews to work with him to restore the ancient abbey of Saint Evroul and, with generous endowments from many of the fitz Giroie family, it was completed in 1050.

In extending his family's wealth and holdings, William had become a vassal of William I Talvas, Geoffrey de Mayenne, and the dukes of Normandy. This worked until about 1044 when William fitz Giroie was defending the castle of Montaigu for Geoffrey de Mayenne against William Talvas. Unable to defeat the castle, William Talvas captured Geoffrey de Mayenne and held him prisoner until William Fitz Giroie destroyed his castle of Montaigu. William fitz Giroie immediately razed his own castle to free his lord and in return Geoffrey de Mayenne built fitz Giroie a new castle at St. Cenery on the river Sarthe. While this was a victory for William I Talvas, it also seems to have caused him great resentment against William fitz Giroie.

William Talvas invited his greatest vassal to his second wedding and although warned by his brother Ralph not to go, William fitz Giroie attended the festivities not suspecting he would be seized and thrown in prison. William Talvas then had him mutilated and blinded before being set free. Somehow William Giroie survived his torture and mutilation and retired to Bec Abbey to live out the remainder of his life as a monk. To avenge this atrocity the sons and kinsmen of William fitz Giroie sacked and destroyed the lands of William Talvas who would not face them in the field. Finally, Talvas' son Arnulf rebelled and exiled his father, now reviled by everyone. He wandered until he was taken in by the de Montgomery family whose son Roger agreed to marry his daughter Mabel in return for the lands William lost.

William fitz Giroie made two pilgrimages to Jerusalem, remarkably, the second was after he had been blinded. His son, William de Montreuil, had just distinguished himself on his mission for Pope Alexander II as commander of his papal forces in Campania and had treasures he wanted to donate to the abbey of Saint Evroul in Normandy. He sent word to them to send a trusted messenger to bring back his gifts for that monastery. When William, now a monk at Bec, heard of the request he volunteered to go to Apulia to meet with his son and bring back the gifts for Saint Evroul. The abbot Theodoric reluctantly agreed to let his friend, now old and blind, to go on this mission accompanied by another monk, Humphrey, Roger of Jumegiès and twelve attendants. They crossed the Alps to Rome, then to Apulia where he met with his son and several of his nephews, family and friends. Intending to stay for some time he dispatched Humphrey to return with a large sum of money. Humphrey reached Rome but was poisoned and robbed of the gold he carried; he died there on December 13, 1056. On hearing this William hastened his departure with another large sum of gold intended for Saint Evroul but got no further than Gaeta when he became mortally ill. He summoned two knights accompanying them, Ansquetil du Noyer and Théodelin de Tanie, entrusting them to take the gold to Saint Evroul for him. William died shortly afterwards on 5 Feb 1057 and was interred there in the church of Saint Erasmus.

== Family ==
William married first, Hiltrude, daughter of Fulbert de Beine. By her he had a son:

- Arnold d'Echaufour

William married secondly, Emma, daughter of Walchelin de Tannei. They had a son:

- William of Montreuil, who later in Apulia was called 'the good Norman.'
