= House of Bellême =

Medieval Norman noble family

de Bellême
- Noble family
- Coat of Arms of the House of Bellême
- Country: Duchy of Normandy
- Founded: c. 10th century
- Founder: Yves de Bellême
- Titles: Count of Alencon; Count of Ponthieu; Count of La Marche; Seigneur de Belleme; Earl of Shrewsbury; Bishop of Lemans; Bishop of Séez
- Connected families: de Montgomery
- Estates: Chateau de Bellême; Chateau de Alençon; Chateau de Domfront; Chateau de Sées; Bridgnorth Castle; Carreghofa Castle

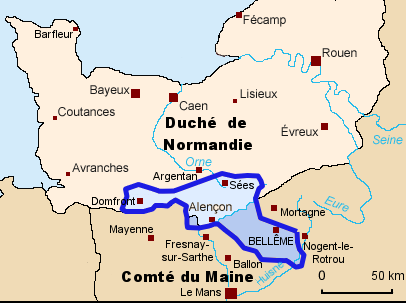
Map of the lands of Bellême

The House of Bellême also referred to as the Family of Bellême was an important seigneurial family in France during the 10th through the 12th centuries. Members of this family held the important castles of Bellême, Alençon, Domfront and Sées in the Duchy of Normandy.

== Rapid rise to prominence ==
The first known progenitor of this family is Yves de Bellême who was probably the son of Yves de Creil, (Note: Yves de Criel and Yves de Bellême are confused by several sources and thought to be the same person by some. Yves de Criel, who was instrumental in saving young Richard I of Normandy would not chronologically be possible to be the same as Yves de Bellême, the subject of this article, who died c. 1005. Geoffrey White believed Yves de Criel was probably the father of Yves de Bellême, which was also accepted by all the French writers, but was of the opinion it should not be stated as fact as it was by Prentout. See: Geoffrey H. White, The First House of Bellême, TRHS, Vol. 22 (1940), pp. 70–71.) The caput of the lordship was the castle of Bellême, constructed "a quarter of a league from the old dungeon of Bellême" in Maine. The second lord, William of Bellême, with the consent of Richard I, Duke of Normandy constructed two castles, one at Alençon and the other at Domfront, the caput of the lordship remained the castle of Bellême. Yet in a charter to the abbey of Lonlay of the lands of Neustria Pia, he describes himself as William princeps and provinciae principatum gerens indicating he considered himself an independent ruler or prince of his own domains. His sons Fulk and Warin died in his lifetime leaving Robert as his heir. Robert de Bellême died a prisoner leaving the fourth son, Ives as lord of Bellême, who shortly thereafter became Bishop of Séez. William Talvas, held the lands of Bellême in right of his brother Bishop Ives who retained the Lordship himself until his death at which time William came into possession of the lands of Bellême, Domfront and Alençon. After the infamous incident (see below) with William fitz Giroie, his kinsmen sacked and destroyed the lands of William Talvas who would not face them in the field. In turn Talvas' son Arnulf rebelled and exiled his father, now reviled by everyone. He wandered until he was taken in by the de Montgomery family whose son Roger agreed to marry his daughter Mabel in return for the lands William lost. Mabel inherited all the vast estates of her father (and in 1079 those of her uncle Bishop Ives) and married the heir of one of the most prominent families in Normandy, Roger de Montgomery, who became the 1st Earl of Shrewsbury.

== Apogee and decline ==
Mabel was succeeded by her son Robert of Bellême, 3rd Earl of Shrewsbury, who continued the aggressive policy of his mother. He built several castles to ensure control of the vast lordship of Bellême and held in total of forty castles, including those of Alençon and Bellême, defending the territory and form a barrier to any attempt to bid. In 1098 Robert's younger brother Hugh died, and Robert inherited, on payment of £3,000 in relief, the English properties that had been their father's, including the Rape of Arundel and the Earldom of Shrewsbury. Robert had also acquired the countship of Ponthieu jure uxoris and the honor of Tickhill; all of which combined made him the wealthiest magnate in both England and Normandy. Robert rebelled repeatedly against the King of England and Duke of Normandy. In 1112 Robert was sent as an envoy of the French king to Henry I at his court at Bonneville whereas Henry seized Robert and imprisoned him. Robert spent the rest of his life as a prisoner; the exact date of his death is not known.

== Bellême family bishops ==
Even as early as the latter half of the tenth century members of this family held the bishoprics of Le Mans and Séez. Seinfroy (Seginfredus) sought the bishopric of Le Mans and offered Geoffrey I, Count of Anjou the hamlet of Coulaines and the villa of Dissay-sue-Courcillon including all fiscal rights if he could use his influence. Geoffrey interceded with King Lothair to obtain the see for Seinfroy who became Bishop c. 970-71. Geoffrey's choice of bishop proved to be a useful ally against the counts of Maine. Although their parentage is unknown, his sister, Godeheut, was the wife of Yves de Bellême. He was followed as Bishop of Le Mans in 997 by his nephew, Avesgaud de Bellême, son of Godeheut and Yves de Bellême. Throughout most of his reign as bishop he and Herbert Wakedog were locked in a bitter and seemingly endless power struggle. At Avesgaud's death in 1036 his nephew Gervais de Bellême, son of his sister Hildeburge de Bellême succeeded him as Bishop of Le Mans.

== Notoriety ==
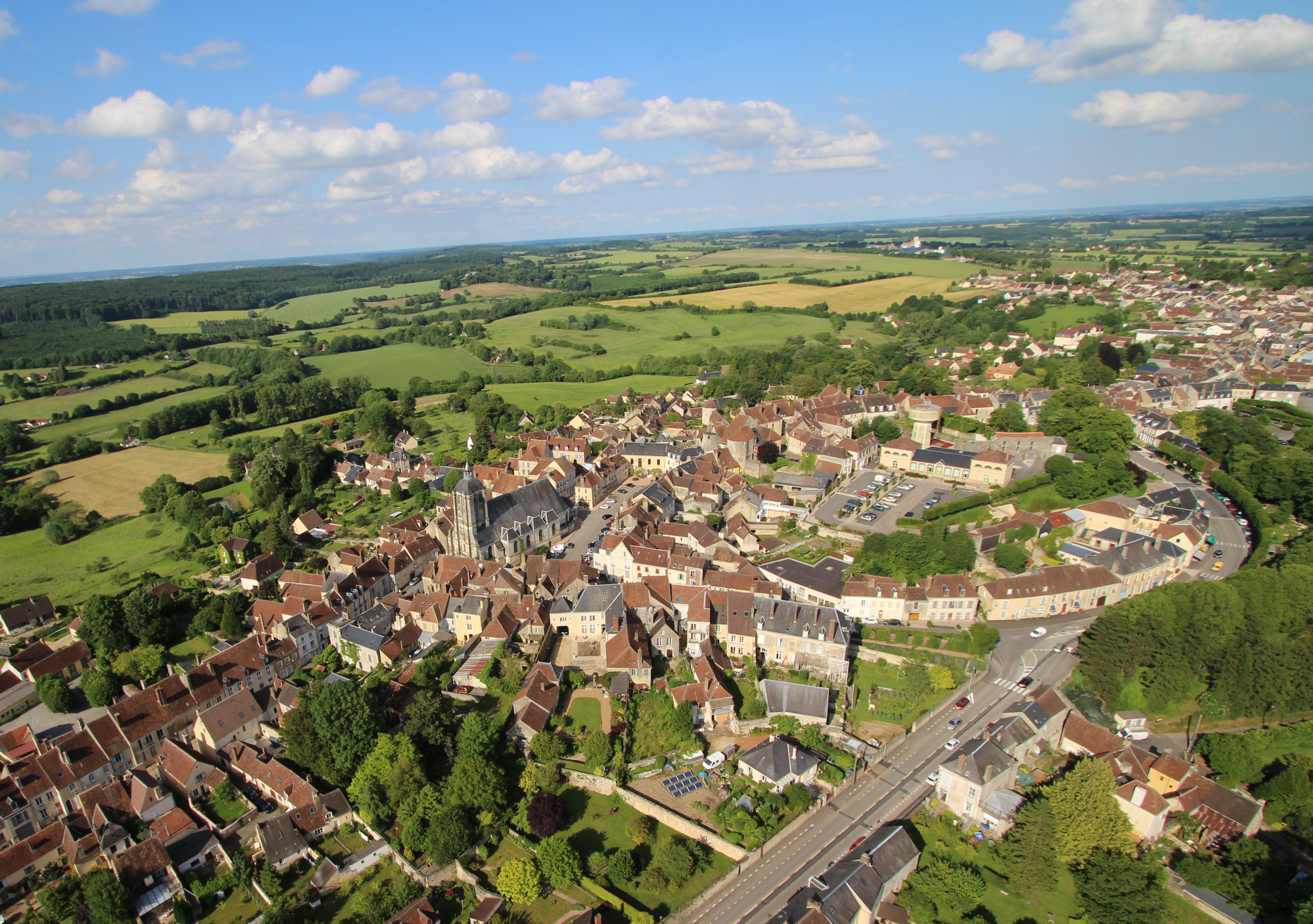
Bellême, Normandy

The chroniclers of ducal Normandy, William of Jumieges and Orderic Vitalis depict several members of the family as cruel and deceptive. While William Talvas was as treacherous and self-serving as any of his family before him he surpassed them in wickedness and cruelty. He had married a Hildeburg, daughter of a nobleman named Arnulf, but he had his wife strangled on her way to church, according to Orderic, because she loved God and would not support his wickedness. Then on the occasion of his second wedding, William Talvas invited one of his vassals William fitz Giroie to attend. Suspecting nothing, fitz Giroie, while a guest at the festivities, was suddenly seized by Talvas' men and imprisoned, then according to Orderic horribly mutilated and blinded before being released. Somehow William Giroie survived his torture and mutilation and retired to Bec Abbey to live out the remainder of his life as a monk.

Of all of Orderic's female subjects William's daughter Mabel was the most cunning and treacherous; if not entirely for her own misdeeds then as the mother of Robert de Bellême, who had a reputation for savagery as well as cruelty. In one passage Orderic describes her as "small, very talkative, ready enough to do evil, shrewd and jocular, extremely cruel and daring. Mabel was hostile to most members of the clergy; but her husband loved the monks at Saint-Evroul so she found it necessary to be more subtle. She deliberately burdened their limited resources by visiting the abbey for extended stays with a large retinue of her soldiers. When rebuked by Theodoric the abbot for her callousness she snapped back that the next time she would visit with an even larger group. The abbot predicted that if she did not repent of her evilness she would suffer great pains and that very evening as she was coming from her bath, some knights that has crept into the castle decapitated her, bringing an end to her evil ways. In continuing her family's feud with the Giroie family she set her sights on Arnold de Echauffour, the son of William fitz Giroie who her father had mutilated at his wedding celebration. She attempted to poison Arnold of Echauffour by placing it in a glass of wine but he declined to drink. Her husband's brother, Gilbert, refreshing himself after a long ride, drank the wine and died shortly thereafter. In the end though she bribed Arnold's chamberlain providing him with the necessary poison, this time being successful. In 1077 she took the hereditary lands of Hugh Bunel by force. Two years later while leaving her bath, she was decapitated by some knights that had crept into the castle.

But, Orderic Vitalis may have been most strongly biased against Robert de Bellême and his treatment of that magnate belies a moral interpretation of his actions. The basis for Orderic's animosity towards Robert and his de Bellême predecessors was the longstanding and bitter feud between the Giroie family, patrons of Orderic's Abbey of Saint-Evroul, and the de Bellême family. William Talvas (de Bellême), Robert's grandfather, had blinded and mutilated William fitz Giroie. (Note: For more on the feud between the Bellêmes and the Giroies see the article William I Talvas.) Robert did at times appropriate church properties and was not a major donor to any ecclesiastical house. But Robert's attitudes toward the church are typical of many of his contemporaries; certainly no worse than the secular rulers and other magnates of his day. The assessment of William II Rufus by R. W. Southern could well apply to Robert de Bellême as well: "His life was given over to military designs, and to the raising of money to make them possible; for everything that did not minister to those ends he showed a supreme contempt".

== Prominent members ==
The five generations of this well-known if not notorious family are represented by:

- Yves de Bellême
  - Avesgaud de Bellême, Bishop of Le Mans
  - William 'Princeps' de Bellême
    - Ives de Bellême, Seigneur de Bellême and Bishop of Sées
    - Benoit, a monk at Fleury Abbey
    - William I Talvas
      - Mabel de Bellême, Dame de Alençon, de Séez, and Bellême, Countess of Shrewsbury and Lady of Arundel
        - Robert of Bellême, 3rd Earl of Shrewsbury
        - Hugh of Montgomery, 2nd Earl of Shrewsbury
        - Roger the Poitevin, Vicomte d'Hiemois
        - Arnulf de Montgomery
