= Danimbold =

Danimbold (Latin: Danimboldus; Italian: Dannibaldo) was the Duke of Gaeta in 1066–1067. He was an appointee of Richard I and Jordan I, co-princes of Capua. He replaced the Lombard Lando and was succeeded by the Norman Geoffrey Ridell after a brief reign, during which he issued three charters still extant in the Codex Caietanus.

== Sources ==
- Skinner, Patricia. Family Power in Southern Italy: The Duchy of Gaeta and its Neighbours, 850-1139. Cambridge University Press: 1995.

Preceded by Lando	Duke of Gaeta; 1066 – 1067	Succeeded by Geoffrey
