= Richard de Courcy =

11th-century Norman nobleman in England

- Born: Courcy
- Died: 1098
- Other name: Richard of Courcy
- Known for: nobleman and landholder
- Spouse: Wandelmode
- Children: William de Courcy and Robert de Courcy

Richard de Courcy (Note: Sometimes spelled Curcy or Courci.) (sometimes Richard of Courcy; died c. 1098) was a Norman nobleman and landholder in England.

Richard was probably the son of Robert de Courcy, and his mother was named Herleva. His family was from Courcy in the Calvados region of Normandy.

In 1075 Richard formed a priory under the Diocese of Séez in Perrières.

Richard gained lands in England after the Norman conquest of England, being named as a tenant-in-chief in Domesday Book. He gave his name to Stoke Courcy, in Somerset, which over time became known as Stogursey. He also held Nuneham Courtenay in Oxfordshire, Sarsden, and Foscot.

After the death of William the Conqueror in 1087, William's lands were divided between the two oldest sons, with Normandy going to the eldest, Robert Curthose, and England going to the next eldest son, William. Both brothers attempted during the next nine years to seize the other brother's lands. Most of the nobility of both England and Normandy chose sides between the two sons, but a few magnates witnessed documents of both brothers. Richard was one of those who was a witness to both Duke Robert and King William II's charters. Richard, along with William Bertram, was named by the nuns of Holy Trinity in Caen, Normandy as stealing from their convent after the death of William the Conqueror.

Richard, along with Hugh de Grandmesnil, resisted the efforts of Robert of Bellême to expand his lands. Shortly before Christmas in 1090, a small war broke out between Robert of Bellême on one side and Richard and Hugh on the other. Robert of Bellême secured the aid of Duke Robert in the efforts to capture Richard's castle at Courcy. This prompted Richard and Hugh to appeal to the duke's brother King William for help. From 1 January 1091 to at least 23 January 1091 Courcy was besieged by Robert of Bellême and Duke Robert. The siege was lifted when King William landed in Normandy in late January or early February. Bishop Gerard of Seez had attempted to mediate the dispute and siege but these efforts ended with Gerard's death on 23 January 1091. Richard was at King William's court between 1091 and 1094, as he is recorded in royal documents for that period.

Richard married Wandelmode and had at least two children: William de Courcy and Robert de Courcy. William inherited the lands in England while Robert received the Norman lands. Robert was married to Rohais, the daughter of Hugh de Grandmesnil.

Richard died around 1098.
