= William de Blosseville =

William de Blosseville, probably from Blosseville, was the consul and duke of Gaeta (as William II) from 1103 to 1105, after ousting Duke Gualganus. He appears on Gaetan follari of his time as DV, which stands for dux Vilelmus. In 1105, he was exiled by Richard I of Aquila after less than two years as duke.

== Sources ==
- Chronology of the ipati, consuls, dukes, princes, kings, and emperors who governed Gaeta from the 9th to the 13th Century.
- The Coins of Gaeta.
- Gregorovius, Ferdinand. Rome in the Middle Ages Vol. IV Part 1. 1905.

Preceded by Landulf	Duke of Gaeta; 1103 – 1105	Succeeded by Richard II
