= Hugh de Grandmesnil =

11th-century Norman nobleman involved in the Norman Conquest of England

Hugh de Grandmesnil (c. 1032 – 22 February 1098), (known in French as Hugues and Latinised as Hugo de Grentmesnil, aliter Grentemesnil, etc.), is one of the proven companions of William the Conqueror known to have fought at the Battle of Hastings in 1066. Subsequently, he became a great landowner in England.

He was the elder son of Robert I of Grandmesnil by his wife Hawise d'Echaffour, a daughter of Giroie, Lord of Échauffour. His younger brother was Robert II of Grandmesnil.

Following the Norman Conquest, King William the Conqueror gave Hugh 100 manors in recompense for his service, sixty-five of them in Leicestershire, in the Midlands. He was appointed Sheriff of Leicestershire and Governor of Hampshire. Hugh's landholdings are listed in the Domesday Book of 1086 ( pp. 652–6).

== Origins ==
The Grandmesnil family achieved prominence in about 1050 in central Normandy, where the family became famous for breeding and training war horses. The family had made a fortune from a string of stud farms they owned on the plains of Ouche, but during the minority of William, Duke of Normandy, the stability of Normandy began to break down. Old scores were settled as the barons seized each other's territories.

Roger de Beaumont brought savage warfare to the lands of Roger de Tosny, as he tried to grasp control of the Risle Valley, in 1041. De Tosny was joined by his ally Robert de Grandmesnil, but in June their forces were shattered in a surprise attack by the Beaumont clan. In the savage fight, de Tosny and two of his sons were killed. Robert de Grandmesnil fared little better. He was carried from the field mortally wounded and died from his wounds three weeks later. His two sons, Robert and Hugh, divided his property between them; Robert entered the Church, becoming a priest, while Hugh took on his father's mantle of warrior politician.

Hugh de Grandmesnil wielded power at the court of William Duke of Normandy, but the paranoid Duke banished Hugh in 1058. For five years Hugh was out of favour at court. In 1063 he was reinstated as Captain of the castle of Neuf-Marché en Lyons. Hugh was made a cavalry commander for the invasion of England in 1066.

There is a popular story that Hugh de Grandmesnil was almost killed at the Battle of Hastings. As fierce battle raged, Hugh's horse leapt a bush during a cavalry charge and his bridle broke. Barely able to keep upright in the saddle, and with no control over his horse, Hugh saw to his dismay that he was all alone, and careering towards a band of Englishmen. Just as his enemies leaped in for the kill and as Hugh was preparing to die, the English gave out a great shout in triumph. Hugh's horse immediately shied in fear and bolted in the opposite direction and carried its helpless master away from the English and back to the safety of his own lines. This depiction is attributed to Wace, writing a hundred years after the battle, with Hugh as "a vassal from Grente-mesnil".

== Leicester ==
Hugh had become one of William the Conqueror's main men in England. In 1067 he joined with William FitzOsbern, 1st Earl of Hereford and Bishop Odo of Bayeux in the government of England, during the king's absence in Normandy. He also was one of the Norman nobles who interceded with the Conqueror in favour of William's son Robert Curthose, and effected a temporary reconciliation.

Following the Conquest William, so far as is known, did not destroy or terrorise Leicester in the same way as he did places further north. By 1086 he had built a castle there with a wooden tower on a mound and an outer bailey. William later handed the castle over to Hugh de Grandmesnil. The Domesday Survey (of 1086) recorded Hugh as owning 190 of the 322 houses in the borough. The king himself owned 39. He also gave De Grandmesnil 100 manors for his service, sixty-five of them in Leicestershire. He was appointed Sheriff of Leicestershire and Governor of Hampshire. According to a historian writing in 1906 Hugh rebuilt the castle in stone and repaired "the rude Saxon church." He ruled the people of the borough as a despot and abolished many of their ancient rights. Among other things he instituted trial by combat instead of trial by 24 burgesses. He married the beautiful Adeliza, daughter of Ivo, Count of Beaumont-sur-l'Oise, from whom he gained several manors in Herefordshire, and three more in Warwickshire.

== Death of Adelize ==
Adelize, the wife of Hugh de Grandmesnil, died at Rouen in 1087, and was buried in the Chapter House of St. Evroult. They had five sons and as many daughters, namely, Robert, William, Hugh, Ivo de Grandmesnil, and Aubrey; and daughters Adeline, Hawise, Rohais, Matilda, and Agnes.

On the death of William the Conqueror, also in 1087, the Grandmesnils, like most of the Norman barons, were caught up in the civil war raging between his three surviving sons. Now lands in Normandy and England had two different masters, as Robert Curthose became Duke of Normandy and William Rufus became king of England as William II. Royal family squabbles put fortunes at risk if barons took the wrong side, and ultimately this was the fate of the Grandmesnil family which tended to support the fickle Duke of Normandy against the English king, although allegiances changed continually. Duke Robert did not always support his barons' loyalty, which is illustrated in Hugh's later struggles.

== Old age ==
By 1090 Hugh de Grandmesnil was still defending his lands in Normandy. Hugh made a stand along with his friend Richard de Courci at the Castle of Château de Courcy, as Robert de Belesme laid siege to them. Belesme had driven his army into the lands along the river Orne. Other barons had joined the fight. This led to an extended siege at Courcy, Calvados in 1091, of three weeks.

Robert de Belesme did not have enough troops to surround the castle of Courci. He set about building a wooden siege engine, the Belfry, a great tower, that could be rolled up to the castle walls. Every time the Belfry was rolled forward, Grandmesnil sallied from the castle and attacked a different part of the line. Soldiers manning the Belfry were urgently needed elsewhere to beat back Grandmesnil's attack. These skirmishes were frequent, savage and bloody. On one occasion William, son of Henry de Ferrers (another Leicestershire landowner, whose family would become Earls of Derby), and William de Rupiere were captured by de Grandmesnil and ransomed for a small fortune. However, Ivo de Grandmesnil, Hugh's son, and Richard fitz Gilbert were seized by the attackers. Ivo was later released, but de Clare did not survive Belesme's dungeon (Planche).

As the siege continued a deadly ritual was played out. The inhabitants of Courci had built their oven outside the castle's fortifications, and it now lay midway between the main gate and the enemy's Belfry. The men of Courci therefore, would stand to arms and rush from the castle to surround the oven, so that the baker could work. Here they would defend their bread, as the attackers would attempt to carry it off. This would often lead to a general engagement as each side poured more troops into the fray. On one occasion Grandmesnil's charge was so ferocious that De Belesme's men were scattered. The men of Courci overran the great siege engine and burned it. However this success was short-lived, as Duke Robert of Normandy took sides with De Belesme. It now looked all over for De Grandmesnil and De Courci. Then William Rufus arrived with a fleet in arms against his brother, and so Duke Robert and De Belesme simply retreated home.

In William avenged Hugh's rebellion against him by having Leicester Castle, the church and part of the town destroyed. This is according to Agnes Fielding Johnson. She does not give a date for this but says Hugh made amends and was restored to his position.

== Hugh's death ==
In 1098, Hugh de Grandmesnil was again in England, worn out with age and infirmity. Feeling his end approaching, in accordance with the common practice of the period, he took the habit of a monk, and died six days after he had taken to his bed on 22 February 1098 at Leicester. His body, preserved in salt and sewn up in the hide of an ox, was conveyed to the valley of the Ouche in Normandy by two monks. He was laid to rest at the Abbey of St. Evroult, and buried by the Abbot Roger on the south side of the Chapter House, near the tomb of Abbot Mainer.

== Issue ==
Hugh's eldest son, Robert III de Grandmesnil (d.1126), inherited his Norman lands in the Ouch valley, while Ivo de Grandmesnil became Sheriff of Leicester, and master of Earl Shilton manor.

William's uncle Odo and many others, who had rebelled against William Rufus in 1088, felt that the First Crusade was a good way to avoid the English king's wrath. On the third day of the siege of Antioch, after a terrible battle on the walls, William Grandmesnil, his brother Aubrey and Ivo of Grandmesnil, banded together with Count Stephen of Blois, father of the future king of England, and several other knights, to let themselves down from the wall on ropes under the cover of darkness. They fled on foot to the coast and the port of St. Simeon where they were transported away by ships. The papacy referred to this retreat as an act of cowardice.

In 1102 Stephen of Blois returned to Jerusalem under a cloud of shame, and died in a battle charge.

Henry I of England had moved swiftly to take the English throne, in Robert Curthose's absence. It appears that Ivo de Grandmesnil was influenced by his brother Robert, who held the family lands in Normandy, and joined the faction fighting against Henry of England. War quickly followed.

Duke Robert set sail for England in 1101 and his army caught up with Henry at Alton, on the Winchester road. A peace was quickly negotiated and Robert went back to Normandy with promises of English gold. This left the Duke's supporters undefended, and King Henry took note of his enemies, including the Grandmesnils.

King Henry bestowed the manors of Barwell, Burbage, Aston, Sketchley and Dadlington on Hugh de Hastings, as he set about getting rid of any baronial opposition. Thus, Ivo, Sheriff of Leicester, found that he was in disgrace at court, and also besieged with lawsuits and delayed judgements by the king. The cronies of the king's court treated Ivo contemptuously, and courtiers openly called him 'ropedancer', a reference to his escape from Antioch. When he over-reacted to the jibes, Ivo was fined for turbulent conduct at court. To escape his situation, Ivo financed another trip to the Holy Land, where he could regain his honour fighting on crusade.

Ivo approached Robert de Beaumont, Count of Meulan, to procure a reconciliation with the king, and to advance him 500 silver marks for his expedition. For this service the whole of Ivo's domains were pledged to Beaumont as a security for fifteen years. Beaumont was also to give the daughter of his brother Henry, Earl of Warwick, in marriage to Ivo's son, Baron Hinckley, who was still in his infancy, and to restore to him his father's inheritance. This contract was confirmed by oath, and ratified by the King. However Ivo died on his crusade to Jerusalem, and when he did not return Robert de Beaumont broke his oaths and took control of the whole of Leicester. He dispossessed Ivo's children, disregarded the marriage, and added all the Grandmesnil estates to his own. By sleight of hand, Earl Shilton manor was now held by Robert de Beaumont, who was created the first Earl of Leicester by the king.

Ivo's nephew and heir, Hugh de Grandmesnil, Baron Hinckley, never recovered the honour of Leicester. The eventual heiress, Pernel, daughter of William de Grandmesnil, married Robert de Beaumont, 3rd Earl of Leicester.

Hugh's daughter Adeline married Roger d'Ivry, who was the sworn brother-in-arms of Robert D'Oyly.

Hugh's daughter Rohais married Robert de Courcy, son of Hugh's friend Richard de Courcy.

== Hugh and Adeliza's holdings in England ==
The Domesday Book lists Hugh's lands in Leicestershire in the following order: Wigston Magna, Sapcote, Frolesworth, Sharnford, Earl Shilton, Ratby, Bromkinsthorpe, Desford, Glenfield, Braunstone, Groby, Kirkby Mallory, Stapleton, Newbold Verdon, Brascote, Peckleton, Illston on the Hill, Thorpe Langton, Stockerston, Burton Overy, Carlton Curlieu, Noseley, Thurcaston, Belgrave, Birstall, Anstey, Thurmaston, Humberstone, Swinford, Bruntingthorpe, Smeeton Westerby, Lestone, Twyford, Oadby, Peatling Parva, Shearsby, Sapcote, Willoughby Waterless, Croft, Broughton Astley, Enderby, Glenfield, Sutton Cheney, Barlestone, Sheepy Magna, Cotesbach, Evington, Ingarsby, Stoughton, Gaulby, Frisby, Shangton, Stonton Wyville, East Langton, Great Glen, Syston, Wymeswold, Sileby, Ashby de la Zouch, Alton, Staunton Harold, Whitwick, Waltham on the Wolds, Thorpe Arnold, Market Bosworth and Barton in the Beans.

In Northamptonshire his lands include pieces in West Farndon, Marston Trussell, Thorpe Lubenham, Weedon Bec, Ashby St Ledgers, Osbern, Welton, Staverton and Thrupp Grounds. Additionally in Nottinghamshire he had interests in Edwalton and Thrumpton. In Warwickshire his lands included( p. 663) Hillmorton, Willoughby and Butlers Marston.

He also had interests in Gloucestershire including Quinton (Upper & Lower), Weston-on-Avon and Broad Marston.

Adeliza's lands in Bedfordshire included Lower and Upper Shelton, Houghton Conquest and Chalton.
