= Andrew of Gaeta =

Andrew (Italian Andrea, Latin Andreas) was the Duke of Gaeta from 1111 until his death in 1113. He succeeded his father, Duke Richard II, upon the latter's death. He left no heir at his death and his duchy escheated to Prince Robert I of Capua, his suzerain. His successor, Jonathan, was in power by May 1113.

In the year of his succession, Girard was elected abbot of Monte Cassino. Andrew swore the same oath to him that his father had sworn to Girard's predecessor. Since they were both vassals of the abbey, they swore to protect the abbey's property in the Terra Sancti Benedicti, especially the castle and lands of Pontecorvo, against all men save Prince Robert, the Pope, Count Hugh of Molise and the count's son Simon, since they were also vassals of these men.

== Sources ==
- Bloch, Herbert (1986). Monte Cassino in the Middle Ages. Volume I (Parts I–III). Cambridge, MA: Harvard University Press.
- Falkenhausen, Vera von (1989). "Dell'Aquila, Riccardo". Dizionario Biografico degli Italiani. Vol. 37. Rome: Istituto dell'Enciclopedia Italian.

Preceded by Richard II	Duke of Gaeta; 1111–1113	Succeeded by Jonathan
