= Landulf of Gaeta =

Landulf (or Lando), either a Lombard count or a Docibilian senator, was the Duke and Consul of Gaeta from 1091 to 1103.

With the death of Jordan I of Capua in November 1090, anarchy erupted in the fiefs of the Principality of Capua, especially in Aquino and Gaeta. In the latter, Renaud Ridel was chased from his tower by the populace, who acclaimed Landulf as their duke. His reign may have lasted for over a decade, but of it nothing is known. He had a son Marinus by his wife Inmilgia, a daughter of a duke of Naples. He was thrown out of Gaeta in 1103 by the Norman William de Blosseville.

== Sources ==
- Leo of Ostia and Peter the Deacon. Chronicon Monasterii Casinensis.
- Chalandon, Ferdinand. Histoire de la domination normande en Italie et en Sicilie. Paris, 1907.

| Preceded by Reginald | Duke of Gaeta; 1091 – 1103 | Succeeded by William II |
