= Jonathan I of Carinola =

Jonathan I (c. 1050 – 1094) was the youngest son of Richard I of Capua. According to the Chronicon Amalfitanorum, however, he was a son of Jordan I, who was actually his brother, and married a sister of Roger I of Sicily, which may be accurate.

During the reign of his brother, he was created Count of Carinola. After Jordan's death, he defended Sora from the counts of Aquino (1091).

His son became Duke Richard III of Gaeta.

== Sources ==
- Chalandon, Ferdinand, Histoire de la domination normande en Italie et en Sicile, t. I, Paris (1907).
