= William I Talvas =

Norman Count

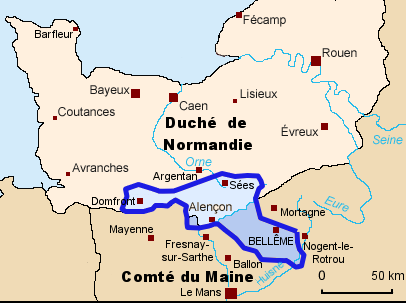
Map of the lands of Bellême

William I Talvas (c. 995 – c. 1060), seigneur of Alençon. According to Orderic Vitalis his nickname Talvas meaning shield, presumably alluded to his hardness or callousness like that of a shield. He was a member of the House of Bellême.

== Life ==
He was a son of William of Bellême and Mathilde of Condé-sur-Noireau. He held lands at Bellême, Domfront and Alençon, He obtained the lands of Bellême from his brother Yves de Bellême, Bishop of Séez (Note: While Orderic stated that William Talvas succeeded his brother Robert, Yves (a.k.a. Ivo) inherited the lands of Bellême at the death of Robert about two years before he became Bishop of Séez in 1035. William Talvas probably held the lands from his brother Yves while he was Bishop and recovered the other family lands on his own. William Talvas never was lord of Bellême as evidenced by his use of his nickname 'Talvas' instead of de Bellême. See Geoffrey H. White, 'The First House of Bellême', Transactions of the Royal Historical Society, Fourth Series, Vol. 22 (1940), pp. 81-3.) who held them of the King of France while Alençon was held of the Duke of Normandy and Domfront of the Count of Maine

While as treacherous and self-serving as any of his family before him he surpassed them in wickedness and cruelty. He had married Hildeburg, daughter of a nobleman named Arnulf, who bore him two children. According to Orderic, William had her strangled on her way to church, because she loved God and would not support his wickedness. William married secondly a daughter of Ralf de Beaumont, Viscount of Maine.

Among the private feuds going on during the minority of Duke William was one that erupted between William Talvas and William fitz Giroie. William fitz Giroie was a vassal of William Talvas and his father Giroie, Lord of Échauffour had assisted Talvas' father and uncle in the struggles against Herbert I Wake-dog, Count of Maine. (Note: For additional information on the wars between Bishop Avesguad de Belleme and Herbert I 'Wake-Dog', Count of Maine see the articles William of Bellême and Avesgaud de Bellême.) William fitz Giroie himself had greatly assisted William Talvas in obtaining his own lands, apparently by force. But William fitz Giroie was also a vassal of Geoffrey de Mayenne, an adherent, in turn, of the Count of Maine. About 1044 William Talvas attacked the castle of Montaigu which was being defended by William fitz Giroie. Unable to defeat the castle William Talvas captured Geoffrey de Mayenne and held him prisoner until William Fitz Giroie destroyed the castle of Montaigu. William fitz Giroie immediately razed his own castle to free his lord and in return Geoffrey de Mayenne built fitz Giroie a new castle at St. Cenery on the river Sarthe. This apparently caused great resentment in William Talvas.

On the occasion of his second wedding, William Talvas invited William fitz Giroie to attend. Suspecting nothing fitz Giroie while a guest at the festivities was suddenly seized by Talvas' men and imprisoned, then according to Orderic horribly mutilated and blinded before being released. Somehow William Giroie survived his torture and mutilation and retired to Bec Abbey to live out the remainder of his life as a monk. To avenge this atrocity the sons and kinsmen of William fitz Giroie sacked and destroyed the lands of William Talvas who would not face them in the field. Finally, Talvas' son Arnulf rebelled and exiled his father, now reviled by everyone. He wandered until he was taken in by the de Montgomery family whose son Roger agreed to marry his daughter Mabel in return for the lands William lost. It seems certain that after the death of Arnulf the following year, that William Talvas recovered his lands. William confirmed a gift to St. Aubin of Angers made by his brother Yves c. 1060–1062 and after that nothing more is heard of him.

== Family ==
By Hildeburg, his first wife, William had two children:

- Arnulf de Bellême, who deprived his father of his estates and wealth and was dead by 1049.
- Mabel de Bellême, who married Roger de Montgomerie, 1st Earl of Shrewsbury and was murdered 2 December 1079

His second wife, a daughter of Ralf de Beaumont, may have been the mother of his son:

- Oliver who after long service in the wars, became a monk at Bec. (Note: He is considered illegitimate by some sources due to his not inheriting his father's extensive lands but Geoffrey White thinks it possible he was legitimate and excluded from inheriting due to an agreement with Roger de Montgomery. See: Geoffrey H. White, 'The First House of Bellême', Transactions of the Royal Historical Society, Fourth Series, Vol. 22 (1940), p. 85)

William Talvas is said to have cursed the infant William, later to become William the Conqueror, in his cradle predicting the child would be the downfall of the house of Bellême.

== Notes ==
Preceded by Garin of Alençon	Count of Alençon; 1026–1030	Succeeded by Roger of Montgomery
