= Rainulf Trincanocte =

Rainulf II, called Trincanocte, was the fourth Count of Aversa (1045–1048), the cousin of his immediate predecessor Asclettin and nephew of Rainulf Drengot, the founder of their family's fortunes in the Mezzogiorno. There was a succession crisis after the premature death of Asclettin and Guaimar IV of Salerno, as suzerain of Aversa, tried to impose his candidate on the Normans, but they elected Trincanocte and he prevailed in getting Guaimar's recognition too. In 1047, he was present at a council with Pandulf IV of Capua and Guaimar, where the former was returned to his princely position and the latter's great domain was broken up. The feudal titles of Rainulf and Drogo of Hauteville, count of Apulia, were confirmed by the Emperor Henry III and they were made his direct vassals. Within a year, Trincanocte died and was succeeded by his infant son Herman under the regency of his cousin Richard, whom he had originally spurned, believing him to be a dangerous rival. Soon, Herman was displaced (or worse) and Richard was count.

== Notes ==
Preceded by Asclettin	Count of Aversa; 1045–1048	Succeeded by Herman
