= Gervais de Château-du-Loir =

French nobleman and bishop (1007–1067)

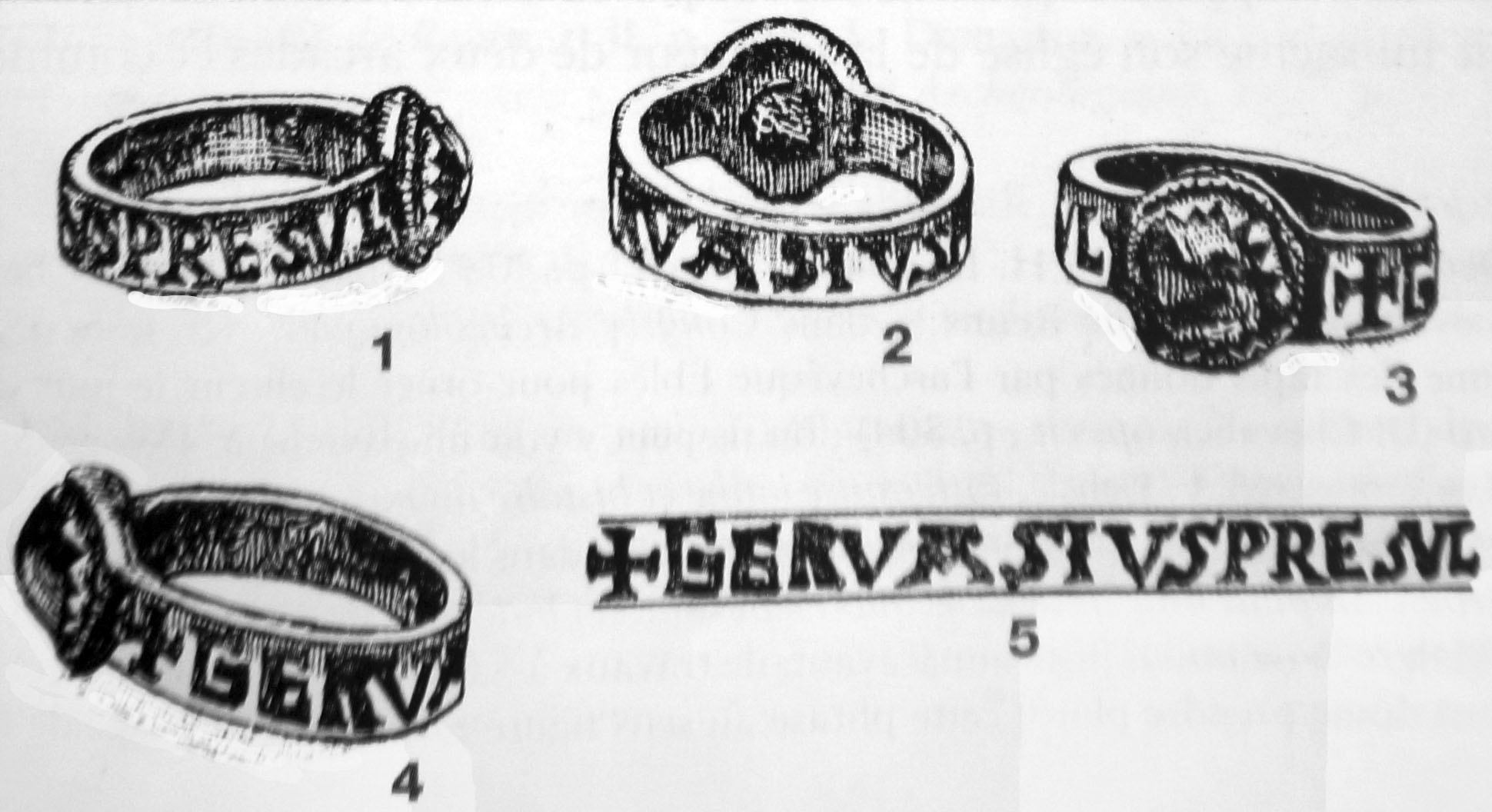
Sketch of Gervais's episcopal ring

Gervais de Château-du-Loir (1007–1067) was a French nobleman, bishop, and a powerful figure of his time in Northern France. He was Bishop of Le Mans from 1036 and Archbishop of Reims from 1055.

His father was Aimon de Château-du-Loir, whilst his mother was Hildeburge de Bellême, daughter of Yves de Bellême. His maternal uncle, Avesgaud de Bellême, Bishop of Le Mans, raised Gervais and groomed him to succeed to the Bishopric of Le Mans. He was a strong supporter of the family of Blois, and opposed to the Angevins. At one point, he had to seek refuge at the court of William, Duke of Normandy. Henry I appointed him Archbishop of Reims in 1055. As Archbishop, he crowned Philip I of France in 1059. Philip's father, Henry I of France, was then alive but died in 1060. Gervais was then regent with Baldwin V, Count of Flanders until 1066. Gervais died in 1067 and was buried in Reims Cathedral.

== Bibliography ==
- Ott. John S. (2015). Bishops, Authority and Community in Northwestern Europe, c.1050–1150. Cambridge University Press. pp. 160–171. ISBN 978-1-107-01781-8.
