= Bromkinsthorpe =

Former manorial estate in Leicester, England

Coordinates: 52.6318°N 1.1444°W

The Domesday manor of Bromkinsthorpe was situated outside the West Gate of Leicester, on the alluvial west bank of the River Soar. Its location is now covered by the area around Braunstone Gate, Leicester, and for much of the medieval period was a liberty within the parish of St Mary de Castro, Leicester, and hence, part of the Borough of Leicester.

Bromkinsthorpe was bisected by the Roman road later known as Fosse Way, which led from Lincoln via Leicester to Cirencester and Exeter. It is presumed this road formed an early north western frontier to the Roman province of Britannia following the original invasion. Whilst there was a Roman villa in what later became Bromkinsthorpe, the first mention of the manor was in the Domesday Book of 1086. At that time it was held by Hugh de Grandmesnil along with 64 other manors in Leicestershire. He held six carucates in Bromkinsthorpe outright, with another two that formed part of the Soke of Ratby in west Leicestershire. In the Domesday Book the manor was recorded as belonging to Leicester, although it is not clear what this statement signified. There was also a link with the manor of Smeeton in south Leicestershire as four sokemen from there were 'attached' to Hugh de Grandmesnil's land in Bromkinsthorpe.

Later, Bromkinsthorpe became part of the Earls of Leicester holdings. Two manors were recorded at Bromkinsthorpe in the 13th century. One was Walsh or Danet's Hall. The second was Westcotes. Both of these manors and their tenants are clearly documented thenceforward. Inhabitants farmed the open field strips surrounding the two manors. Some records suggest these strips formed one of the great open fields of Leicester. Others indicate that Bromkinsthorpe itself had three great open fields. The abbey of St Mary de Pratis, Leicester held considerable land in Bromkinsthorpe. The inhabitants also had rights in Leicester Forest, for which they were compensated when it was deforested in 1628. The manors were largely enclosed by the end of the 17th century.

During the 18th century, urban Leicester encroached the manors, with some large houses, complete with extensive grounds and orchards built. These were demolished in the 19th century when new high-density housing was built that obliterated the rural aspect of Bromkinsthorpe. The manors were thus subsumed into the rapidly expanding Borough of Leicester.
