= Lando of Gaeta =

Italian nobleman

Lando was the Duke of Gaeta briefly in 1064–1065. He was appointed by Richard I and Jordan I, co-princes of Capua, after the revolt of William of Montreuil, who attempted to repudiate Richard's daughter and marry Maria of Gaeta.

Lando may have been the same person as the Lando of Traietto who was a brother of Atenulf II of Gaeta and brother-in-law of Maria. He rebelled along with his son Peter, his brother Atenulf, and William in 1064.

Lando retired to Rome, where he was still living in 1093, at some point and gave all his lands in the Duchy of Gaeta to Montecassino.

== Sources ==
- Skinner, Patricia. Family Power in Southern Italy: The Duchy of Gaeta and its Neighbours, 850-1139. Cambridge University Press: 1995.

== Notes ==
Preceded by William I	Duke of Gaeta; 1064 – 1065	Succeeded by Danimbold
