= Avesgaud de Bellême =

French nobleman and bishop (died c. 1036)

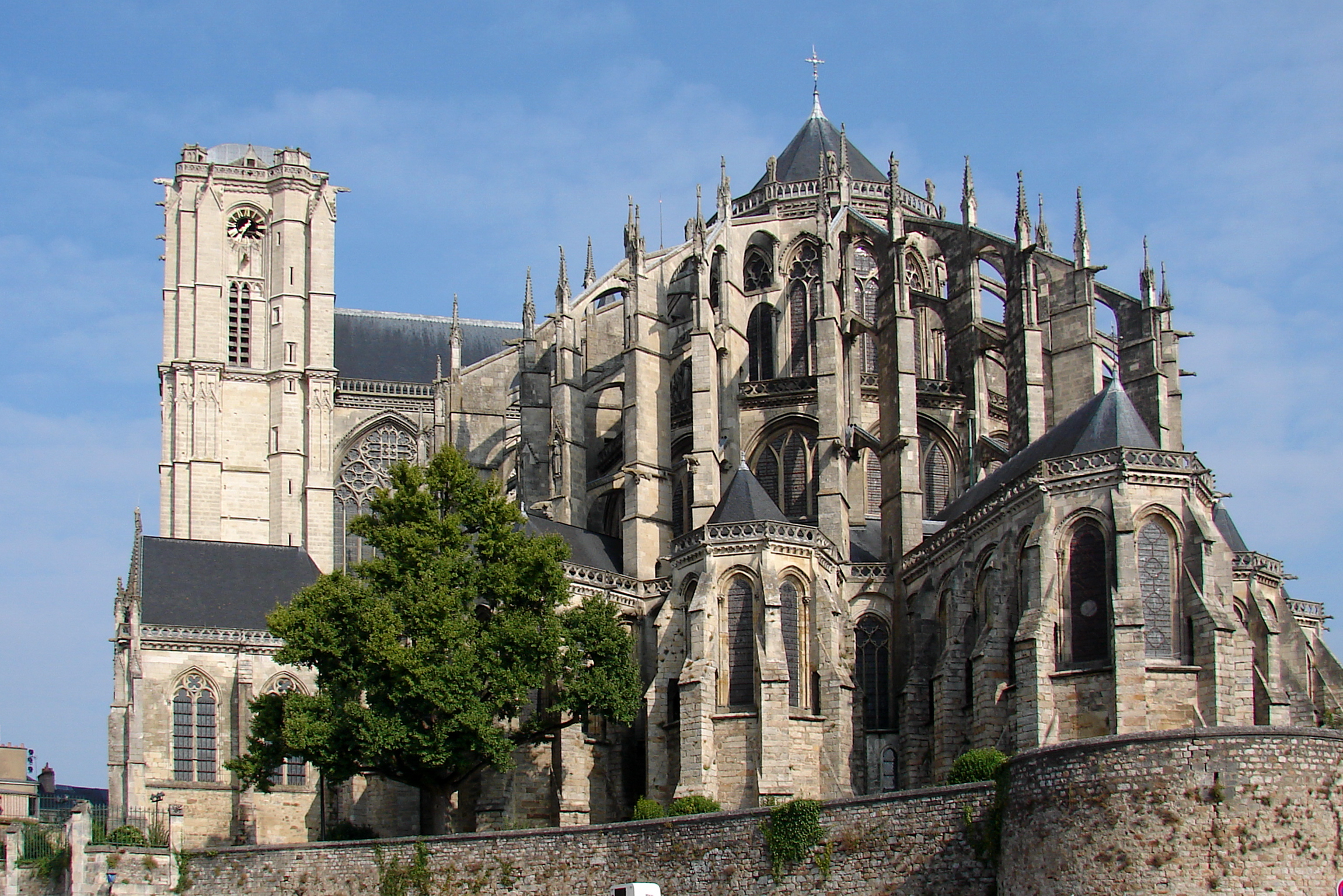
Cathedral of St. Julien at Le Mans

Avesgaud (Latin Avesgaudus) (died c. 1036) was a French nobleman, a member of the powerful House of Bellême and was the Bishop of Le Mans from 997 until his death. His episcopate was overshadowed by his ongoing wars with Herbert I, Count of Maine.

== Life ==
Avesgaud de Bellême was a son of Yves de Bellême and Godeheu (Latin Godehildis). His maternal uncle was Seinfroy (Sigefroi), Bishop of Le Mans, whom he succeeded around 997. His bishopric was centered on St. Julian of Le Mans.

Both Seinfroy and Avesgaud belonged to the powerful and independent House of Bellême, which controlled the borders of Perche, Séez and Alençon, between the Île-de-France and Normandy. The Bellêmes were not considered loyal to either Normandy or the French king. Seinfroy, however, had been an adherent of Geoffrey I, Count of Anjou, to whom he owed his appointment to the see of Le Mans. For possibly the same reason, Avesgaud was aligned with Count Fulk as well.

The first years of his reign as bishop were quiet, until Herbert became Count of Maine about 1017. From that time on, the two were locked in a bitter and endless struggle. Avesgaud resisted all forms of comital control from Herbert Wake-dog and, in addition to his own forces, enlisted help from a knight named Herbrannus, paying him with lands from the church estates. However, Herbrannus failed to defend the Bishop against Count Herbert.

During his long wars with Herbert, the count attacked and destroyed Avesgaud's castle at Duneau, causing Avesgaud to flee to the protection of his brother William's castle at Bellême. Once he was safe, the Bishop excommunicated Herbert and then continued his warring against him. Not long after the excommunication was lifted and peace was restored between them, Herbert started raiding the Bishop's estates again. When Herbert learned the Bishop had built a castle at La Ferté-Bernard, he attacked Avesgaud there, causing the Bishop to flee again, but this time the castle was repaired. On the last occasion Avesgaud was forced to leave his see, he traveled to the Holy Land on a pilgrimage. He is said to have died c. 1036 at Verdun on his return to Le Mans. (Note: According to the Cartulaire de St. Victeur au Mans, ed. Bertrand de Broussillon, pp. i3, 10, in 1037 Avesgaud is said to have attested a charter at Angers and, in March of 1039/40, another at Mont Saint-Michel. See Geoffrey H. White, 'The First House of Belleme', Transactions of the Royal Historical Society, Fourth Series, Vol. 22 (1940), p. 75 n 5&6. Other sources date his death from that of Count Herbert I of Maine, suggesting Avesgaud died about five months earlier, in October 1035. See Kate Norgate, England Under the Angevin Kings, Vol. I (Macmillan and Co., New York, 1887), p. 205 n. 1.)

== Family ==
He was succeeded as bishop of Le Mans by his nephew Gervais de Château-du-Loir, son of his sister, Hildeburge de Bellême. His brother, Yves de Bellême (d. 1030), was the Abbot of Fleury. Another nephew, Ives, son of his brother William, was Seigneur de Bellême and Bishop of Sées.
