= Yves de Creil =

10th century regis balistarius to the King of France

Ives I de Creil was regis balistarius to the King of France, in the 10th century. (Note: Geoffrey H. White was certain that Yves de Creil and Yves de Bellême, though often confused, were not one and the same person. While the French writers accepted that Yves de Creil was the father of Yves de Bellême, there remains some question they were even of the same family. See White, 'The First House of Bellême', TRHS, 22, pp. 69-70. Alternatively see: Henri Prentout, Études sur quelques points d'histoire de Normandie(Impr. Lanier, Caen, 1926, p. 89.)

== Life ==
His parentage is unknown but by his name he was associated with Creil, a small town in the territory belonging to Bernard, Count of Senlis. It is known that he served king Louis IV d'Outremer about 945 in the somewhat ambiguous capacity of a royal balistarius (Latin meaning variously crossbowman, operator of a siege engine, or as one in charge of siege equipment).

In 942 his actions helped save the life of Richard, Duke of Normandy, who was effectively held a prisoner by King Louis IV of France at Laon. The king was planning to kill or mutilate the young Richard so as to take control of Normandy himself. Yves de Creil learned of the plot and passed the information to the boy's tutor, Osmund, who then took Richard secretly to the safety of the castle of Coucy, held by Bernard of Senlis.

While his later career is obscure there are charter evidences regarding a Yves de Creil. In a diploma of St. Dennis dated 18 March 968 a signatory is an Ivonis whom Stapleton identifies as Yves de Creil. Along with Bishop Seinfroy (whose sister married Yves de Bellême) an Yves attested a charter of the Abbey of St. Julian of Tours dated February 970/1. Another charter by Hugh, Archbishop of Rouen to abbot Galon of Abbey of Saint-Germain-des-Prés (979-89) contained, among the attesters, "S. Ivonis, Item S. Ivonis" who Prentout thought to be Yves de Creil and his son Yves de Belleme. Yet another charter, this by Hugh, Duke of France, in 981 contains the mention of a gift by "Yves and his wife Geile" with the consent of Yves his son and his unnamed wife (the wife of Yves de Bellême was named Godeheut). The last (and undated) charter contains the name "Ivo veteranus", presumed to be Ives de Creil by Stapleton and Yves de Bellême by Prentout, is for Marmoutier Abbey, Tours.

== Family connections ==
While the French writers, including Prentout, accepted that Yves de Criel was the father of Yves de Bellême, Geoffrey H. White was of the opinion that, while probable, it should not be stated as fact.
