= Herman of Aversa =

Herman

Herman (fl. c. 1050) was the son of Rainulf Trincanocte, count of Aversa (1045–1048), whom he succeeded. He was only an infant then and he was put under the regency of his father's cousin Richard. Within two years, he had disappeared from the scene and Richard was count. His fate is a mystery, though it is not hard to imagine that, as an obstacle to power, he was disposed of in the most efficient manner.

== Sources ==
- Norwich, John Julius. The Normans in the South, 1016–1130. London: Longmans, 1967.
- Chalandon, Ferdinand. Histoire de la domination normande en Italie et en Sicile. Paris: 1907.

Preceded by Rainulf II	Count of Aversa; 1048–1049	Succeeded by Richard I
