= Asclettin Drengot =

Asclettin Drengot (also Ascletin or Asclettino; in Latin Asclettinus, Asclittinus, Aschetinus) was the son of Asclettin, count of Acerenza, brother of Rainulf Drengot, whom he succeeded in the county of Aversa in 1045. He was duly elected by the Norman nobles of Aversa and invested with the countship by his suzerain, Guaimar IV of Salerno.

Asclettin did not immediately come into possession of the duchy of Gaeta, which Ranulf had ruled as a vassal of Guaimar. Instead, the Gaetans chose Atenulf, Count of Aquino, as duke. Guaimar attacked and defeated him on behalf of Asclettin, but in return for his assistance against Pandulf the Wolf, then assaulting Monte Cassino, he freed him and confirmed in Gaeta.

Asclettin only ruled a few months before dying prematurely. He was succeeded by his cousin Rainulf Trincanocte. His younger brother Richard later succeeded to Aversa and brought the family the principality of Capua as well.

Preceded by Rainulf I	Count of Aversa; 1045	Succeeded by Rainulf II
Preceded by Rainulf I	Duke of Gaeta; 1045	Succeeded by Atenulf I
