= Richard II of Gaeta =

Consul and duke of Gaeta from 1104-1105

Richard II (Note: Or Richard I if Richard I of Capua is not counted.) (died 1111), called Richard of Aquila (Riccardo dell'Aquila), was the consul and duke of Gaeta, ruling from 1104 or 1105 to his death.

Richard was the son of Count Bartholomew of Caleno, possibly from a junior branch of the counts of Aversa. Other researchers link him to the Norman lords of L'Aigle and assume him to be a younger son of Richer, the lord of L'Aigle, and nephew of Hugh d'Avranches, Earl of Chester.

He conquered the duchy from his predecessor, William Blosseville, whom he exiled. He subsequently minted his own coinage as an independent prince. He was also count of Suessa.

He lent troops to Pope Paschal II in 1108 to retake Rome. He was a constant ally of the pope and enemy of Ptolemy I of Tusculum.

== Sources ==
- Chronology of the ipati, consuls, dukes, princes, kings, and emperors who governed Gaeta from the 9th to the 13th Century.
- The Coins of Gaeta.
- Gregorovius, Ferdinand. Rome in the Middle Ages Vol. IV Part 1. 1905.
- Thompson, Kathleen, "The Lords of Laigle: Ambition and Insecurity on the borders of Normandy" in Anglo-Norman Studies; XVIII; ed. Christopher Harper-Bill, Woodbridge, 1996, pp. 177–199.

Preceded by William	Duke of Gaeta; 1105–1111	Succeeded by Andrew
