= Bernard of Senlis =

Bernard I (or II) of Senlis (c. 919 – c. 947) was a Frankish noble from Herbertien dynasty, a branch of Carolingian dynasty. He was a descendant of Charlemagne and his son Pepin of Italy. He was a cousin of Herbert I, Count of Vermandois.

Bernard was a grandson of Pepin II, Count of Senlis and Valois (846–893). There are conflicting views on whether Pepin (876–922) or Bernard (c. 875–927) was the younger Bernard's father.

He was Count of Beauvais and Count of Senlis. Both he and his cousin Herbert I, Count of Vermandois were influential nobles of the western northern part of the Frankish Kingdom.

It is believed that Robert I of Senlis (d. 1004) was his son.
