= Raynald Ridel =

Raynald or Reginald Ridell (French: Renaud Ridel, Italian: Rinaldo Ridello) was the Duke of Gaeta as a vassal of the Prince of Capua from 1086 until his death. He was both a son and a successor of Geoffrey Ridell.

His reign marked a political separation between Gaeta the city and Pontecorvo, a massive rural castle where the Ridells resided. They ruled the countryside from Pontecorvo and took little interest in the affairs of the Hellenic and urban Gaeta, where they were largely unwelcome. Raynald did not rule long and was succeeded by his only son, Gualganus, before 1091.

== Notes ==
Preceded by Geoffrey	Duke of Gaeta; 1086 – ????	Succeeded by Gualganus
