= Atenulf II of Gaeta =

Atenulf II (died October 1064) was the duke of Gaeta for a brief two years (1062–1064) under the regency of his mother, Maria. He was the son and successor of Atenulf I, who had been forced to recognise the suzerainty of the prince of Capua, Richard I, and his son Jordan in 1058.

Atenulf I died on 2 February and on 1 June, Maria had confirmed a year-long treaty with several neighbouring counties against the dominance of the Normans of Aversa and Capua. During March of the year of peace, Atenulf II remained at Gaeta and on 28 June 1063, Gaeta was captured by Jordan and became a city of the prince of Capua. Atenulf was allowed to maintain possession until the next year, when his mother's new husband, William of Montreuil, was installed as duke.

== Sources ==
- Norwich, John Julius. The Normans in the South 1016-1130. Longmans: London, 1967.
- Chalandon, Ferdinand. Histoire de la domination normande en Italie et en Sicilie. Paris, 1907.

Preceded by Atenulf I	Duke of Gaeta; 1062–1064	Succeeded by William I
