= Château de Courcy =

Ruined castle in Normandy, France

Coordinates: 48°58′16″N 0°02′27″W

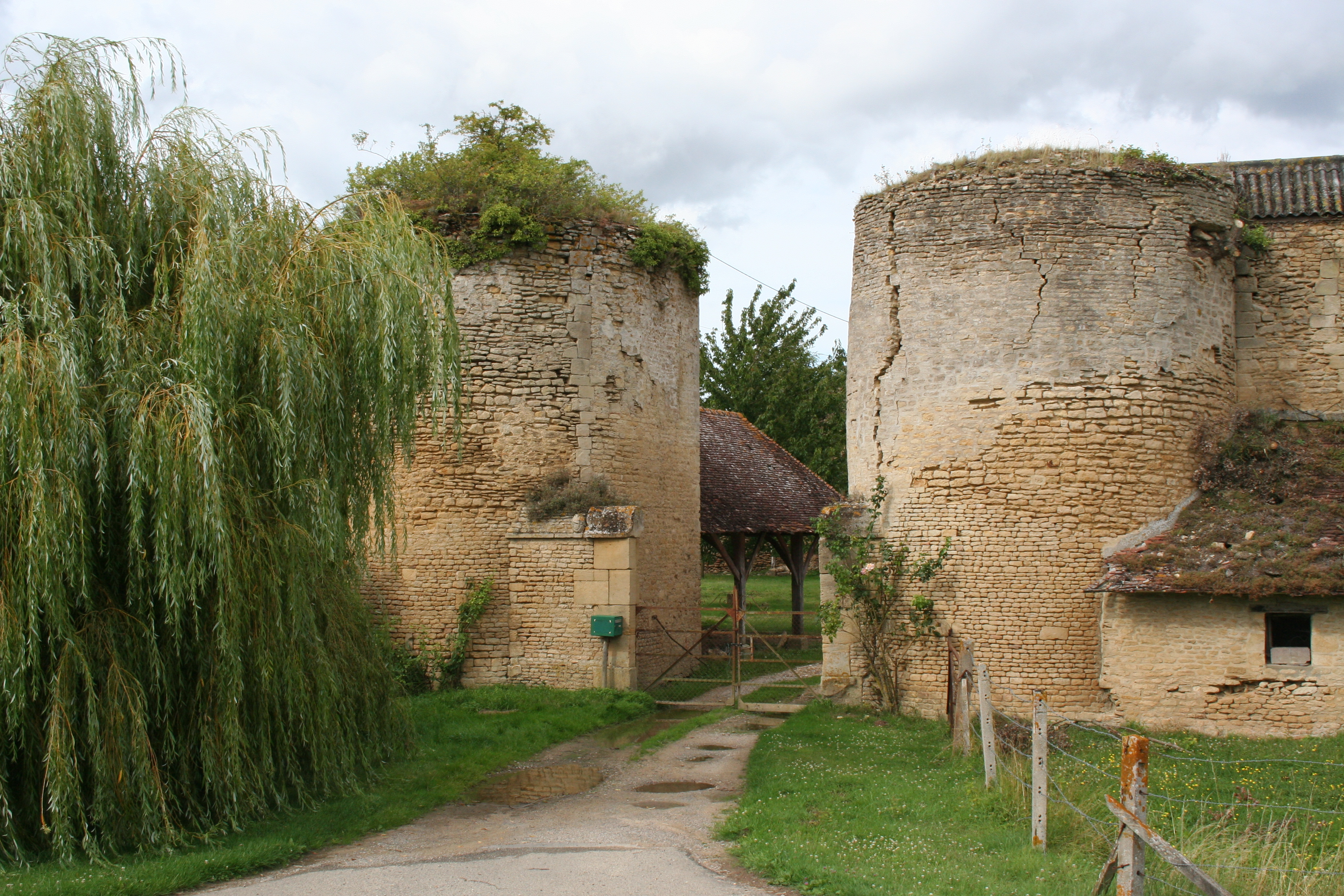
Château de Courcy

The Château de Courcy is a ruined castle in the commune of Courcy in the south of the Calvados département of France. The edifice, typical of 12th–13th century military architecture, is in danger due to the lack of protective measures, even since being added to the monument historique inventory by the French Ministry of Culture in 1975.

== History ==
- 1091: The castle, belonging to Richard de Courcy, was besieged by Robert Curthose or Courteheuse.
- At the start of the 17th century, it was demolished by order of Richelieu and, losing all military function, slowly became an agricultural enterprise.

In 1975, the remaining parts of the former castle including the gate on the road from Tôtes and the gateway to the second enceinte were protected by being added to the supplementary inventory of historical monuments. In spite of this protection, the condition of the site has continued to deteriorate.

=== Successive owners of the property ===
- Baudric le Teuton obtained the Courcy land by homage to Richard II, Duke of Normandy.
- Robert de Courcy

== Description ==
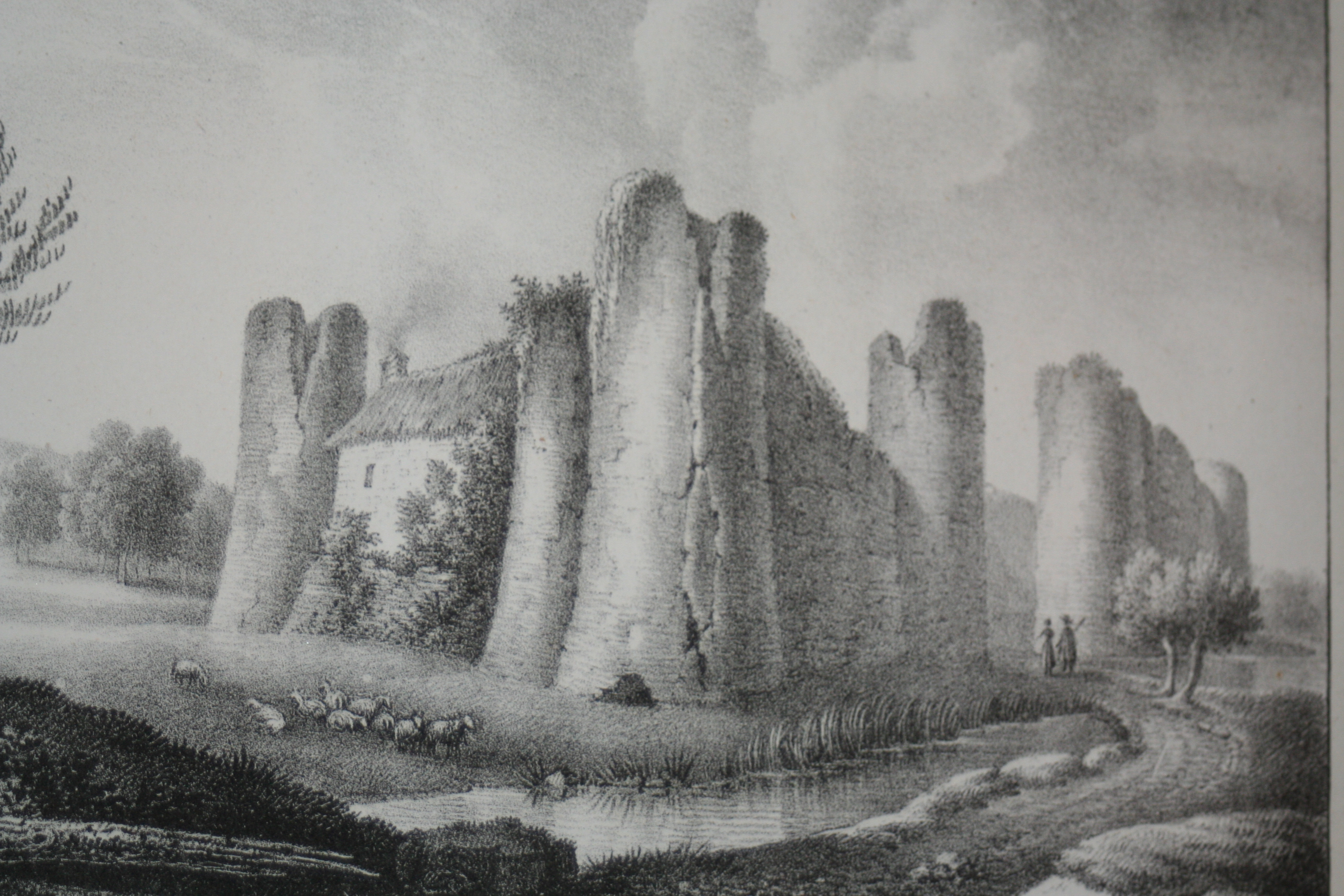
General view of the castle in a lithography of 1826 from Mémoires of the Société des antiquaires de Normandie

The first castle in Courcy was probably built of earth and wood.

The structure of the fortification was conceived as a succession of three enceintes (one surrounding the village, another around the lower court and the last constituting the heart of the fortress): only the last remains.

Surrounded by moats, the last enceinte was about 10 m high and defended by twelve towers, of which only nine round towers remain, and a square tower which probably served as a keep.

Elsewhere in the enceinte are the remains of the Saint Catherine chapel, datable to the 12th century but having been greatly remodelled in the 15th-16th centuries.

== See also ==
- List of castles in France
