= William of Montreuil =

Italo-Norman Duke

William of Montreuil, Duke of Gaeta
- Died: after 1068; Rome
- Noble family: Giroie
- Spouse: daughter of Richard I of Capua
- Father: William fitz Giroie
- Mother: Emma de Tannei

William of Montreuil (French: Guillaume de Montreuil; died after 1068), was an Italo-Norman freebooter of the mid-eleventh century who was briefly Duke of Gaeta. He was described by Amatus of Monte Cassino as "an exceptional knight, small in stature, who was very robust, strong, valiant" and by Orderic Vitalis as 'the good Norman' (French: le bon Normand).

== Career ==
He was a son of William fitz Giroie Lord of Échauffour and Montreuil-l'Argillé and Emma de Tannei, daughter of Walchelin de Tannei. By a charter to the Abbey of Saint-Evroul in 1050, William was still in Normandy at that time. Like his father and brother he granted all the monasteries he possessed, in return "for no small sum", to the abbey of Saint-Evroul. With his brother Arnold consenting, he granted the abbey his mills, farms and fisheries. Before leaving Normandy he also donated a farm of one plough, situated at Verneuces, to the abbey of Saint-Evroul "for the redemption of the soul of his mother Emma."

=== In Italy ===
William left Normandy for Italy before 1056. At some point he joined forces with Richard I Drengot, who became Prince of Capua in 1058. Richard both adopted William as his son and gave him his daughter's hand in marriage. Richard granted his son-in-law the unconquered counties of Marsia, Campania, and Aquino as part of her dowry, giving William the title of Duke of Gaeta. The prince then ceded control of Gaeta to William, but he soon revolted and attempted to repudiate his wife (Note: In the spring of 1063 Pope Alexander II forbade William to repudiate his wife, the prince's daughter. "We have heard through the testimony of many that you wish to cast off your own wife, using a claim of consanguinity as a pretext, and adhere to another. We forbid this by Apostolic authority, and order you that you should in no way presume to reject the wife whom you how have or to marry another, until the case has been examined by a council of religious bishops". See: History of the Normans by Amatus (2004), 148 n. 6.) after which he planned to marry Duchess Maria, widow of Atenulf I, the former Duke of Gaeta. He joined together with Count Atenulf of Aquino, (Note: Not to be confused with Duke Atenulf I of Gaeta who had died two years earlier. See: 'History of the Normans by Amatus' (2004), 148 notes 7 & 8.) Lando, Count of Traietto, and Lando's son Peter to free themselves of Prince Richard's control and keep their castles. William obtained some help from friends in Apulia consisting of donations and knights to support him and returned to hold Traetto against the prince. The prince in turn encamped near Traetto across the Garigliano river and for months the two sides engaged in small skirmishes. Finally, short of supplies William and his companions left Traetto for Aquino, where they parted each going his own way. William returned to the castle of Piedimonte trying to gather supplies but with little success.

Prince Richard next acted to break up the coalition between William, Atenulf, Lando and the Duchess Maria. He arranged for Maria to wed his son, Jordan (who he had also made a prince), which offer the duchess readily accepted. Next the prince offered Lando the hand of another daughter, which Lando humbly accepted. He then made Lando Duke of Gaeta in William's place. William was still married to the prince's daughter and by the intercession of William's friends, asked the prince's forgiveness. The prince returned William's wife and heaped riches on him (although there was no further mention of William becoming a duke). It was also at this time the peasants of the castle of Piedimonte rebelled and all the Normans William had left to guard the castle were killed, which disturbed William greatly.

William rebelled against Prince Richard a second time, (Note: The dates of William's two rebellions against Prince Richard are not at all clear. Likewise how the two occasions of William's papal service fit into this chronology is also less than clear. The best source for information on William at this point is Amatus of Montecassio, the Italo-Norman monk whose chronicle The History of the Normans (Latin: L'Ystoire de li Normant) follows William's career in Italy. See: Hist. Normans by Amatus(2004), pp. 150 n. 11, 154-5 & ns. 27-29.) apparently emboldened by the lands originally given him by the prince had since been regranted by the pope. William assumed he could count on the pope opposing his master Richard, so he began burning the prince's towns. After suffering this injury to his realm Richard finally sent his son Jordan against William with two hundred and sixty knights. Not being able to locate William or his troops, Jordan and his knights raided William's territories carrying off a great deal of plunder. By this time William had been away at Rome and on his return he asked that the animals be returned to him as they hadn't been plunder, it was robbery (Note: William's request for the return of his animals refers to temporal privileges usually associated with and granted to crusaders and others involved in holy wars. When Pope Urban II proclaimed the First Crusade in 1095, these promises of protection for a crusader's property and family while serving the church were offered as an inducement. But the origins of these privileges are found in church custom predating this crusade and it's clear this is what William is referring to here. See: Edith Clementine Bramhall, 'The Origin of the Temporal Privileges of Crusaders', The American Journal of Theology, vol. 5, No. 2 (Apr., 1901), pp. 279-292.) since William had been away at the time. Jordan refused claiming William broke his oath of fealty. William furious with this reply took his eight hundred knights and three hundred infantry and attacked Jordan. According to Amatus, the plunder was abandoned and Jordan and his knights fled the battle after losses on both sides. William then returned to Aquino. Prince Richard then asked for help from Duke Robert in dealing with William, but before anything could be organized it was learned that William had died.

=== Papal service ===
William took up service with Pope Alexander II as commander of his papal forces. He was gonfalonier of the Roman troops, carrying the banner of St. Peter in the conquest of the fertile plains of Campania. The inhabitants were schismatics, a splinter group who had cut themselves off from the Catholic Church. William, by force of arms, compelled them to accept the authority of the church. William, called le bon Normand, was in another expedition at Girona in Catalonia, Spain in charge of troops recruited from Italy and the south of France. An Islamic historian called William de Montreuil the "Captain of the Cavalry of Rome" at the Siege of Barbastro in 1063.

William was, like many of his kinsmen, a benefactor to the Abbey of Saint-Evroul in Normandy. When visited by his father, he sent back a great deal of gifts and money to Saint-Evroul with his father and his companions. William gave to his cousin, Robert de Grandmesnil, former abbot of Saint-Evroul, half the town of Aquino to support him and his monks, the brothers having recently been exiled from Normandy. In September 1068, he granted two churches to Monte Cassino, which is the last record of him. According to the chronicler Amatus of Montecassino, William died in Rome of a "burning fever."

== Notes ==
Preceded by Atenulf II	Duke of Gaeta; 1064	Succeeded by Lando
