= List of counts of Aversa =

In 1030, the first Norman foothold in the Mezzogiorno was created when Sergius IV of Naples gave the town and vicinity of Aversa as a county to Ranulf. The following are the Counts of Aversa:

- Rainulf I 1030–1045

After Rainulf I died in June 1045, a succession crisis developed. Rainulf's nephew, Asclettin, succeeded him, but died with a matter of months. At that time in late 1045 / early 1046, Guaimar IV, the Prince of Salerno and suzerain of Aversa, attempted to appoint Rodulf Cappello the Count of Aversa. With the assistance of Pandulf IV of Capua, however, Rainulf Trincanocte made his way to Aversa, built local support, and was duly elected as the Count of Aversa replacing the temporary appointment of Rodulf.

- Asclettin II 1045 (nephew of Rainulf I)
- Rodulf Cappello late 1045 / early 1046 (appointee of Guaimar IV)
- Rainulf II Trincanocte late 1045 / early 1046 –1048 (cousin of Asclettin)
- Herman 1048–1049 (son of Rainulf Trincanocte)

Herman was an infant when he succeeded his father and required a regent. The first regent appointment, Bellebouche, was a failure. Richard Drengot, a cousin of Herman's, was then in a Melfitan prison for making war on Drogo. Guaimar IV procured Richard's release and personally brought him to Aversa, where he was installed as regent. Later Richard would succeed his cousin and serve as the Count in his own right.

- Richard I 1049–1078 (son of Asclettin II)

In 1058, Richard conquered the Principality of Capua and thereafter the counts of Aversa were, more importantly, princes of Capua.
