= Yves de Bellême =

Progenitor of the House of Bellême (died c. 1005)

Yves d'Alençon (died c. 1005), Seigneur de Bellême, the first known progenitor of the House of Bellême.

== Life ==
Yves was probably the son of Yves de Creil, (Note: Yves de Criel and Yves de Bellême are confused by several sources and thought to be the same person by some. Yves de Criel, who was instrumental in saving young Richard I of Normandy would not chronologically be possible to be the same as Yves de Bellême, the subject of this article, who died c. 1005. Geoffrey White believed Yves de Criel was probably the father of Yves de Bellême, which was also accepted by all the French writers, but was of the opinion it should not be stated as fact as it was by Prentout. See: Geoffrey H. White, The First House of Bellême, TRHS, Vol. 22 (1940), pp. 70-71.) one of those who saved young Duke Richard I from death or mutilation at hand of King Louis IV of France. Yves de Bellême held the castle and lands of Bellême, of the King of France, as well as the Sonnois and part of the Passais, both held of the Count of Maine. That he held part of the march-lands of Passais is known from his having given abbot Gauzlin of Fleury Abbey the lands of Magny-le-Désert.

His wife was named Godeheut and although her parentage is unknown, she was the sister of Seinfroy, Bishop of Le Mans. Yves was the founder of a church dedicated to the Virgin Mary in his castle of Bellême and endowed it with a church in the Sonoisis, another at Vieux Bellême plus a vill and three other churches in the Hiesmois. Yves died sometime after 1005.

== Family ==
Yves de Bellême and his wife Godeheut had five children:

- William of Bellême (960/5 - 1028), succeeded his father as seigneur de Bellême.
- Yves de Bellême (d. 1030), Abbot of Fleury.
- Avesgaud de Bellême (d. 1036), Bishop of Le Mans.
- Hildeburg, abt. 1006 married Aimon, Seigneur de Chateau-du-Loir.
- Godehilde, married Hamon-aux-Dents or Hamon Le Dentu, he was the 1st Baron of Le Creully and he was Lord over Creully, Torigni, Évrecy & St. Scolasse-sur-Sarthe, but he lost all his lands, after trying to kill William the bastard, in the battle of Val-ès-Dunes, Normandy, France

== Notes ==
Preceded by unknown	Seigneur de Bellême to 1005	Succeeded by William of Bellême
