= Courcy, Calvados =

Courcy
- Commune
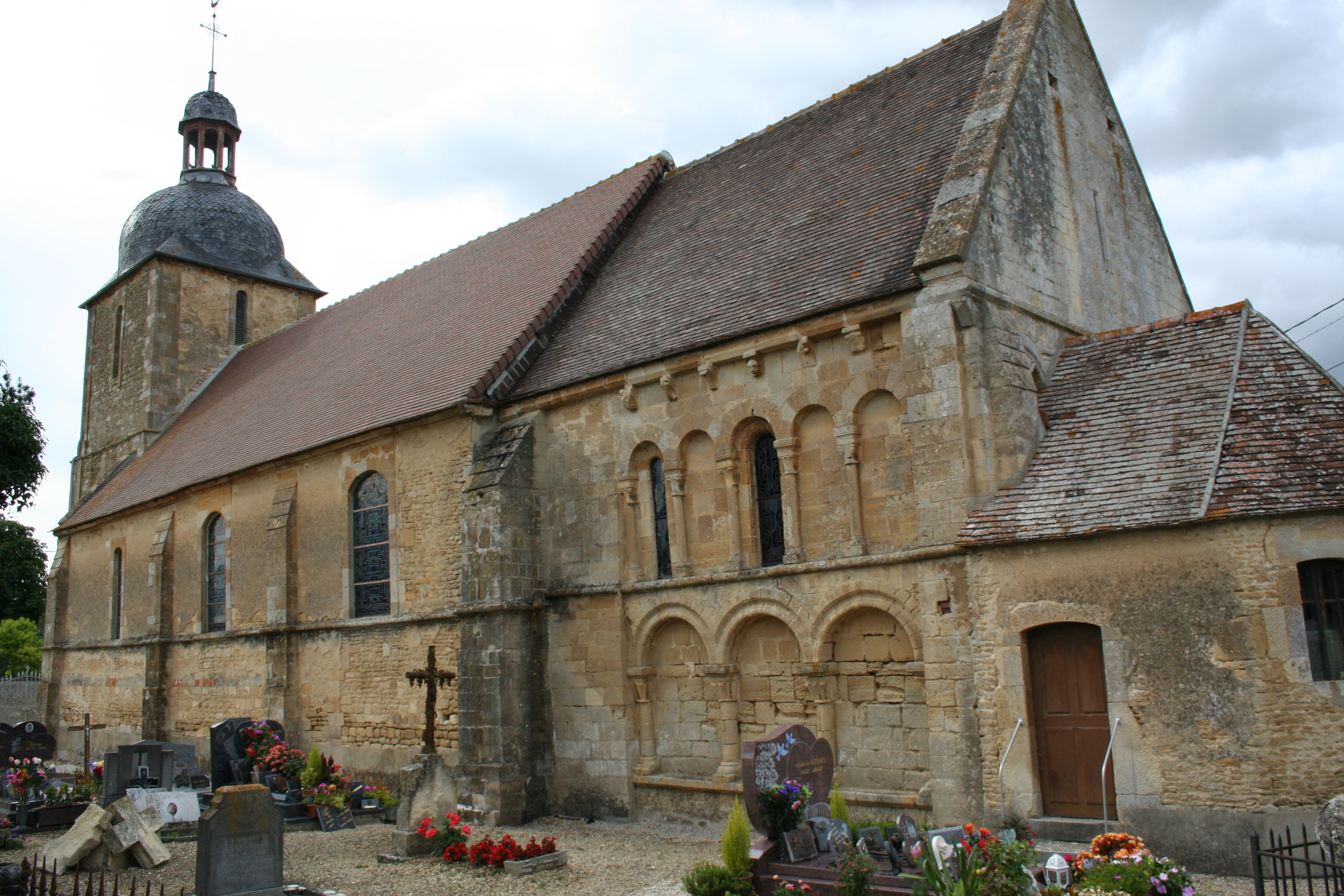
- The church in Courcy
- Location of Courcy
- Location within France Location within Normandy
- Coordinates: 48°58′20″N 0°02′31″W
- Country: France
- Region: Normandy
- Department: Calvados
- Arrondissement: Caen
- Canton: Falaise
- Intercommunality: Pays de Falaise

Government
  - Mayor (2020–2026): Marc Verdonck
- Area^{1}: 9.12 km^{2} (3.52 sq mi)
- Elevation: 55 m (180 ft)
- Highest elevation: 79 m (259 ft)
- Lowest elevation: 38 m (125 ft)
- Population (2023): 148
  - Density: 16.2/km^{2} (42.0/sq mi)
- Time zone: UTC+01:00 (CET)
  - Summer (DST): UTC+02:00 (CEST)
- INSEE/Postal code: 14190 /14170
- ^{1} French Land Register data, which excludes lakes, ponds, glaciers > 1 km^{2} (0.386 sq mi or 247 acres) and river estuaries.

Courcy (French pronunciation: [kuʁsi]) is a commune in the Calvados department in the Normandy region in northwestern France.

== Geography ==
The commune is made up of the following collection of villages and hamlets, Favières, Pont and Vendeuvre.

A single watercourse Le Douit du Houle, flows through the commune.

== Population ==
Historical population
Year	Pop.	±% p.a.
1968	191	—
1975	166	−1.98%
1982	154	−1.07%
1990	152	−0.16%
1999	141	−0.83%
2007	152	+0.94%
2012	144	−1.08%
2017	134	−1.43%
2023	148	+1.67%
Source: INSEE

== Points of Interest ==
The commune has two sites listed as a monument historique;

- Château de Courcy, 12th/13th-century castle, listed as a monument since 1975.
- Church of Saint Gervais and Saint Protais. The church was built, added to and altered between the 12th and 18th centuries. It is constructed of limestone with a tiled roof.

The choir dates from the 12th century. There is a 16th-century tomb. The nave and tower date from the 18th century. A 17th-century sacristry was replaced in 1830 by the present sacristy.

The church has been a listed monument historique since 1927.

== See also ==
- Communes of the Calvados department
