= Richard I of Capua =

Norman ruler of Aversa, Capua, and Gaeta in Italy (1025 – 1078)

Richard Drengot (c. 1025 – died 1078) was the Norman count of Aversa (1049–1078), prince of Capua (1058–1078, as Richard I) and duke of Gaeta (1064–1078).

== Early career in Italy ==
Richard, who came from near Dieppe in the Pays de Caux in eastern Normandy, was the son of Asclettin I, count of Acerenza, younger brother of Asclettin II, count of Aversa, and nephew of Rainulf Drengot. Richard arrived in Southern Italy shortly after Rainulf's death in 1045, accompanied by forty Norman knights. When he first arrived in Aversa, according to Amatus of Montecassino Richard was well received by the people who followed him as if he were a count. He was described as strikingly handsome, a young man of open countenance who by design rode a horse so small his feet nearly touched the ground. (Note: The eleventh-century warhorse was usually smaller, usually no taller than 12 hands; 14 to 15 hands at the largest. By comparison, 10 hands is the size of a modern Shetland pony while 12 is still a pony. A modern small Hunter is 14 hands. The size of medieval warhorses are based contemporary illustrations showing the knights riding "long" with the stirrups hanging well below the horse's midsection. See John France, Western warfare in the age of the Crusades, 1000-1300 (Ithaca, NY: Cornell University Press, 1999), p. 23.) But the attention he garnered disturbed his cousin, Rainulf Trincanocte, the reigning Count of Aversa who asked him to leave. Richard then took up service with Humphrey of Hauteville, brother of Drogo of Hauteville, count of Apulia who treated him with great respect and honor.

When Sarulus of Genzano, an adherent of Richard's brother Asclettin (who died c. 1045), discovered Richard was with Humphrey, he approached Richard and asked him to come to Genzano, which his brother had ruled. Richard came and the townspeople accepted him as their lord giving him rule over the town. With Sarule's help Richard's plundering and pillaging made him powerful enough that Trincanocte, in an effort to appease Richard, gave him a grant of lands formerly held by his brother Asclettin. He next dealt with Drogo but this time was less successful, for Drogo captured and imprisoned Richard, placing him at Drogo's mercy. Richard languished there until Rainulf Trincanocte died leaving an infant son Herman, who needed a regent to govern for him. The suzerain of Aversa and Apulia, Prince Guaimar IV of Salerno, procured Richard's release and he was set up as Herman's guardian in 1048. Soon, however, Herman disappeared from the records and Richard titled himself count.

== Count of Aversa ==
He was present, in 1053, at the Battle of Civitate, where he commanded the right wing against the Lombards of the papal army. He charged first that day and routed the Lombard contingent, pursuing them a long distance before turning back to assist Humphrey and Robert Guiscard. The battle ended in a decisive victory for the Normans. The citizens promptly surrendered Pope Leo IX to the Normans, who treated him with the utmost respect while nonetheless escorting the pope to Benevento, where he was held until shortly before his death in 1054. A series of deaths during the period of 1054–1056, that of Pope Leo with no immediate successor, of Constantine IX Monomachos leaving Constantinople in internal strife and Emperor Henry III leaving a child heir, gave the Normans a near free hand in Southern Italy. Richard had been constantly seeking territorial expansion through war against his Lombard neighbors, Pandulf VI of Capua and Guaimar's son and successor, Gisulf II of Salerno. He pushed back the borders of the latter until there was little left of the once great principality but the city of Salerno itself and when the weak prince of Capua died in 1057, he immediately besieged Capua and took the princely title (1058) from Pandulf's brother, Landulf VIII, but left the keys to the city in Lombard hands for at least four years more, until 12 May 1062.

== Prince of Capua ==
=== Relations with Gaeta ===
Richard betrothed his daughter to the son of Atenulf I, Duke of Gaeta, but when the boy died before the marriage took place, he demanded the morgengab anyway. The duke refused and consequently Richard besieged and took Aquino. Even before the siege of Aquino was finished, Richard as the Prince of Capua, visited the abbey of Monte Cassino with a small force to give thanks to St.Benedict He was welcomed with all due pomp and ceremony and in turn he issued a grant of protection to the Monastery's property. The monastery had previously been under the control of the fanatically anti-Norman abbot Frederick of Lorraine, who was replaced when Pope Stephen IX died, the Normans were warmly welcomed. But Desiderius of Benevento, the new the abbot of Montecassino, asked Richard to extort only 4000 sous from Duke Atenulf which, after several more weeks of trying to hold out, the duke finally paid.

In 1062, Richard sent his son Jordan to take Gaeta from Atenulf II, but Atenulf was allowed to continue personal rule until 1064. Though, in that year, Richard and Jordan appropriated the ducal and consular titles of the Gaetan rulers. Richard quelled a later rebellion of Atenulf's.

=== Relations with the papacy ===
In February 1059, Hildebrand, the future Pope Gregory VII, then only a high-ranking member of the Papal Curia, travelled to Capua to enlist his aid on behalf of the reforming Pope Nicholas II against the antipope Benedict X. Soon, Richard was besieging Benedict in Galeria and, in 1059, Nicholas convened a synod at Melfi where he confirmed Robert Guiscard as duke of Apulia, Calabria, and Sicily and Richard as count of Aversa and prince of Capua. Richard swore allegiance to the papacy and respect for papal territory, completely transforming the political loyalties of the south of Italy and removing the few remaining independent Greek and Lombard princes and the Holy Roman emperor from the picture.

In 1061 he, again at Hildebrand's request, militarily installed the reformers' papal candidate Alexander II against the claims of an antipope, this time Honorius II. He was rapidly becoming a popemaker, though, in 1066, still bent on expanding in all directions his power, he marched on Rome itself, but was beaten back by the pope's Tuscan allies.

In 1071, when Robert Guiscard was away besieging Palermo, his chief barons, Abelard and Herman, sons of his brother Humphrey, Peter, lord of Trani, and the lord of Giovinazzo rebelled with the support of Richard of Capua and Gisulf of Salerno. Though Robert quickly dispelled all threats to his power from within, he took ill and could not make an expedition against Richard, who was soon confirmed in his possessions by and allied with the new pope, Gregory VII, Hildebrand.

In 1076, in response to the Emperor Henry IV's deposition of the pope, Robert and Richard each sent ambassadors to the other. They met midway and arranged a meeting of the two rulers at Monte Cassino later that year. An alliance was formed, and the pope, by excommunicating the emperor, having proven capable of taking care of himself, the two Norman leaders sat down to besiege Gisulf in Salerno. The siege was successful and Gisulf fled to Capua, where he tried to stir up Richard against Robert, who had kept Salerno, but to no avail. Richard began to besiege Naples, still independent, with the aid of Robert's naval blockade. Then, on 3 March 1078, the pope excommunicated Robert and Richard and soon after Richard lay dying in Capua. He quickly reconciled with the church and died. His eldest son, the aforementioned Jordan, who had been invading ecclesiastic domains in the Abruzzi at the time, traveled to Rome to renew his fealty to the papacy and be confirmed in his father's titles and possessions. Naples remained untaken.

== Family ==
Richard married Fredescende d'Hauteville, daughter of Tancred of Hauteville and Fressenda, and sister of Robert Guiscard, Duke of Apulia. Together they had:

- Jordan I of Capua
- Jonathan, Count of Carinola
- Bartholomew, Count of Carinola
- an unnamed daughter, married William of Montreuil
- an unnamed daughter, married Lando of Gaeta

== Notes ==
Preceded by Herman	Count of Aversa; 1049–1078	Succeeded by Jordan I
Preceded by Pandulf VI	Prince of Capua; 1058–1078	Succeeded by Jordan I
