= Hugh, Count of Suio =

Hugh (fl. 1023–1040) was the Count of Suio in the Duchy of Gaeta. He was probably a son of Docibilis magnificus, who in turn was probably a son of Landolf, son of Gregory, Duke of Gaeta, and Landolf's mistress Polyssena (Pulessene). He was a brother of Duke Leo II of Gaeta.

Hugh is first mentioned in 1023, when he made a donation of the castle at Suio to the Abbey of Montecassino. Hugh was ill at the time and the donation may have been an attempt to solicit divine favour. On the other hand, considering the instability in Gaeta, Hugh may have been seeking a protector in the abbot, Theobald. What is certain is that Hugh remained staunchly loyal to the ruling branch of his dynasty, the Docibilians, in Gaeta, for he dated his charter by the rule of John V of Gaeta and his regents Emilia and Leo I at a time when the other high-ranking vassals of Gaeta were moving towards independence. Hugh's loyalty may be self-serving, however: his son John, at least, had economic interests in Gaeta.

Hugh maintained his position even after Pandulf IV of Capua conquered Gaeta in 1032. In 1040, he confirmed his gift of 1023 to abbot Riccherius and specifically reserving half of the castle for his son.

He was succeeded by his son John, who was still in power in 1079.

== Sources ==
- Skinner, Patricia (1995). Family Power in Southern Italy: The Duchy of Gaeta and its Neighbours, 850-1139. Cambridge University Press. ISBN 0-521-46479-X.
