= Bernard (bishop of Gaeta) =

Bishop of Gaeta (died between 1047 and 1049)

Bernard (died between 1047 and 1049) was the Bishop of Gaeta for fifty years from his appointment in 997 until his death. He was a member of the Docibilan dynasty which ruled the Duchy of Gaeta from 867 to 1032. During his long episcopate he achieved the economic security of his see in the face of labour difficulties, annexed the diocese of Traetto to his own in or soon after 999, and witnessed the decline and replacement of his family in Gaeta.

Bernard was a younger son of Duke Marinus II. His appointment as bishop in 997 may have been intended to give the ruling dynasty control of the church in their city, where conflicts with prior bishops had not been uncommon, or to contain the ambitions of a younger son; or both. His election as bishop was earlier than the month of May, during which he witnessed a charter by which the diocese leased some of its property to private persons, signing as a "cleric ... I should attain the rank of bishop" (clericus… quia debeo ad ordinem episcopatus adtingere). In September he consecrated a church in Gaeta before ceding it to three Roman churchmen. Towards the end of 998 he participated in a synod in Rome under Pope Gregory V. After the death of Andreas, bishop of Traetto, who last appears in documents in 999, he united the Traettan diocese to his own.

The first tests of Bernard's leadership were a couple of disputes in 999. He disputed the rights to Spinio (Spigno Vecchia) with his nephew, Count Daufer II of Traetto, but they came to an agreement and divided the place later that year. Then two famuli, John and Anatolius, sons of Passari Caprucce and his wife Benefacta, claimed they were free men while Bernard claimed they were slaves belonging the church of Gaeta. Bernard called in the assistance of the imperial missus of the region, Notticher, who travelled to Gaeta, Traetto, and Castro Argento to settle other labour disputes which had arisen and were costing the diocese heavily. Bernard alludes to working refusing to work in his letter to Notticher. When the missus demanded that John and Anatolius submit to trial by combat (unheard of in Gaeta, where Byzantine law was the rule), they instead swore an oath that their mother had been a freewoman and paid a pound of gold, which Notticher accepted.

As early as 1002 Bernard had entered into friendly relations with his sister-in-law Emilia. In that year he repaid her in land for the services she had done the church. When, in 1012, she became regent for her son, John V, Bernard supported her against her opponents, Leo I and Leo II, and by 1025 she was victorious, largely due to Bernard. In 1014 Bernard represented John during arguments held between the counts of Traetto and the Abbey of Montecassino, a sign of his importance during the regency of Emilia, but also of the declining importance of the dukes of Gaeta (nominally) in their own duchy.

In 1008, Bernard built the church of Saint John the Baptist in Gaeta with financial help from some of the leading families of the city. Of the last three decades of his episcopate, little is recorded. The last datable record is from 1032, the same year Prince Pandulf IV of Capua conquered the city. He continued on as bishop under successive Lombard and Norman governments, but how long is unknown. One dubious document from May 1047 refers to him as bishop, but he was succeeded, thanks to the remaining supporters of his family, by his nephew Leo, son of Leo II, at least by July 1049.

== Sources ==
- Petrucci, Armando. (1967). "Bernardo" Dizionario Biografico degli Italiani, vol. 9. Rome: Istituto Italiano dell'Enciclpoedia.
- Skinner, Patricia. (1995). Family Power in Southern Italy: The Duchy of Gaeta and its Neighbours, 850–1139. Cambridge: Cambridge University Press. ISBN 0-521-46479-X.
