= Duchy of Gaeta =

Italian duchy (839–1140)

Duchy of Gaeta Ducatus Caietae (Latin)
- 839–1140
- Flag Coat of arms

- The states present in Campania around the year 1000. In red, the Duchy of Gaeta.
- Capital: Gaeta
- Common languages: Medieval Latin
- Religion: Roman Catholicism
- Government: Oligarchy
- Duke
  - 839–866: Constantine of Gaeta (first)
  - 1121–1140: Richard III of Gaeta (last)
- Historical era: Middle Ages
  - Established: 839
  - Disestablished: 1140
- Currency: Follaro gaetano
Preceded by	Succeeded by
Duchy of Naples	Kingdom of Sicily
- Today part of: Italy

The Duchy of Gaeta (Latin: Ducatus Caietae) was an early medieval state centered on the coastal South Italian city of Gaeta. It began in the early ninth century as the local community began to grow autonomous as Byzantine power lagged in the Mediterranean and the peninsula due to Lombard and Saracen incursions.

The primary source for the history of Gaeta during its ducal period is the Codex Caietanus, a collection of charters preserving Gaetan history better and in greater detail than that of its neighbouring fellow tyrrhenian duchies : duchy of Naples, Amalfi and Sorrento. In 778, it was the headquarters from which the patrician of Sicily directed the campaign against the Saracen invaders of Campania.

== Rise of the Docibilans ==
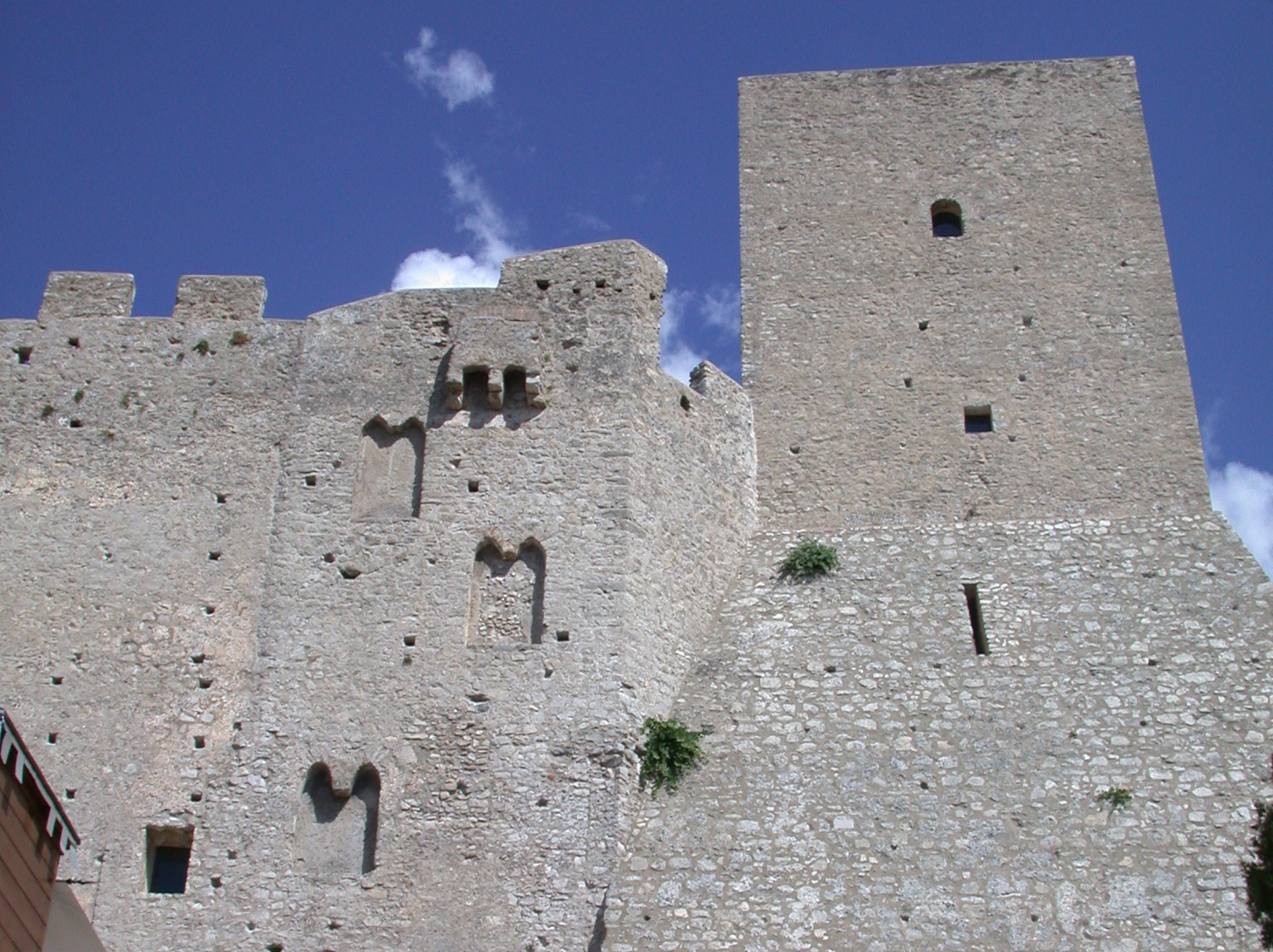
The square tower of the Castle of Itri, attributed to Docibilis I

The first consul of Gaeta, Constantine, who associated his son Marinus with him, was a Byzantine agent and a vassal of Andrew II of Naples. Constantine defended the city from the ravages of Muslim pirates and fortified it, building outlying castles as well. He was removed, probably violently, by Docibilis I, who established a dynasty and made Gaeta de facto independent.

The Docibilian dynasts regularly worked to advance Gaetan interests through alliance with whatever power was most capable of such at the time. They joined forces with the Saracens against their Christian neighbours and with the Pope against the Muslim pirates at the Battle of Ostia. They constructed a massive palace and greatly increased the city's prestige and wealth. The Gaetans remained nominally Byzantine in allegiance until the mid tenth century, fighting under their banner at the Battle of the Garigliano. The chief success of the Docibilians lay, however, in extracting Gaeta from the Ducatus Neapolitanus.

It was Docibilis II (died 954) who first took the title of dux or duke (933). Docibilis saw Gaeta at its zenith but began the process whereby it was chiefly weakened. He gave Fondi to his second son Marinus with the equivalent title of duke and set a precedent for the partitioning of the Gaetan duchy and its encastellation, which corroded ducal authority over time.

== Decline of ducal power ==
In 962, Gaeta put itself under Pandulf Ironhead, the Lombard prince of Capua. In 963, however, only the municipal rulers appeared in the charters. In 976, the Holy Roman Emperor, Otto II, and the pope were the recognised suzerains of Gaeta. A complete revolution had occurred since the assumption of the ducal title and the Western Emperor had replaced the Eastern as overlord.

Gaeta declined in importance in the late tenth and early eleventh centuries. In 1012, a succession crisis weakened it further. John IV died, leaving one son by his wife Sichelgaita, a sister of Sergius IV of Naples. This son, John V, ruled under the disputed regency of his grandmother Emilia. His uncle Leo I usurped the duchy only to be removed in a few short months and his other uncle, Leo II, fought over the regency with Emilia. It wasn't until 1025 that the situation was settled. After that, John V sheltered the fleeing Sergius of Naples and aided him in retaking his city with Norman assistance. For this, John V earned the enmity of Pandulf IV of Capua and his duchy was conquered in 1032. The local dynasty, descended from Docibilis, would never recover its duchy.

== Lombard period ==
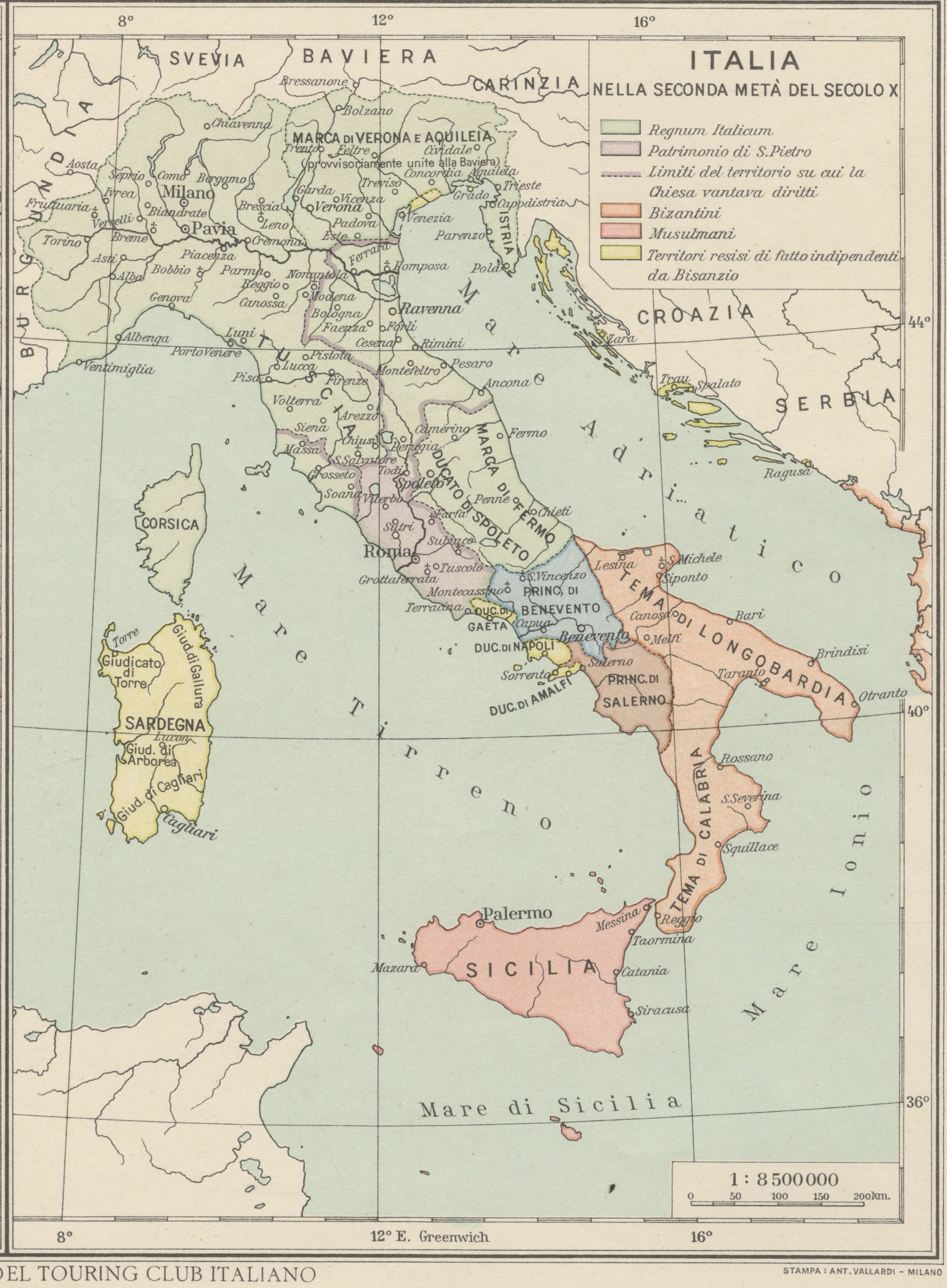
Italy in the second half of 10th century; Duchy of Gaeta (Ducato di Gaeta) is clearly visible.

Gaeta was conquered by the Lombards in 1032. In 1038, the conqueror, Pandulf of Capua, was deposed and replaced by Guaimar IV of Salerno. Guaimar did not reign personally for long before appointing the chiefest of his Norman mercenaries, Ranulf Drengot, as duke. On Ranulf's death, however, the Gaetans elected their own Lombard candidate, Atenulf, Count of Aquino.

Under Atenulf and his son, Atenulf II, Gaeta remained practically independent, but Richard I of Capua and his son Jordan subjugated it in 1058 and then again in 1062. In 1064, the Lombard ruler was expelled and a Norman, William of Montreuil, took his place and married the Lombard widow of Atenulf I, Maria, daughter of Pandulf. The place of women in the rule of Gaeta was significant.

== Norman period ==
The Norman overlords of Gaeta appointed dukes from various families of local prominence, Normans mostly, until 1140, when the last Gaetan duke died, leaving the city to the king of Sicily, Roger II, to whom he had pledged himself in 1135. The first Norman duke after the brief tenure of Ranulf Drengot under Guaimar was William of Montreuil, appointed in 1064. He tried to legitimise his rule by marriage to the widow of his Lombard predecessor, but after his expulsion by his Norman overlord, the prince of Capua, Richard I, it was not necessary for any subsequent dukes to legitimise themselves: the Normans had established their power.

From 1067 or 1068 to 1091, Gaeta was ruled by the Norman Ridello family. Their power was set in Gaeta and Geoffrey Ridello ruled from Pontecorvo, but the Gaetans were not completely weaned from their independent past yet. On the death of Jordan I of Capua, Gaeta rebelled against Norman rule and set up as their duke one Landulf. He ruled successfully until 1103, because the Norman prince of Capua, Richard II, was exiled from his capital. In 1103, William Blosseville conquered the city and in turn was conquered by Richard of Aquila in 1105. Richard was a de facto independent duke as were his successors. The death of Jordan I had sapped the Norman dynasty of Capua of its authority and this had a great effect on Gaeta. After Richard's death (1111), Gaeta was ruled by Andrew Dell'Aquila until 1113, when Richard of Caleno got it. Finally, in 1135, Richard of Caleno was forced to make submission to King Roger, who had forced the last prince of Capua, Robert II, to make submission the same year.

== Economy ==
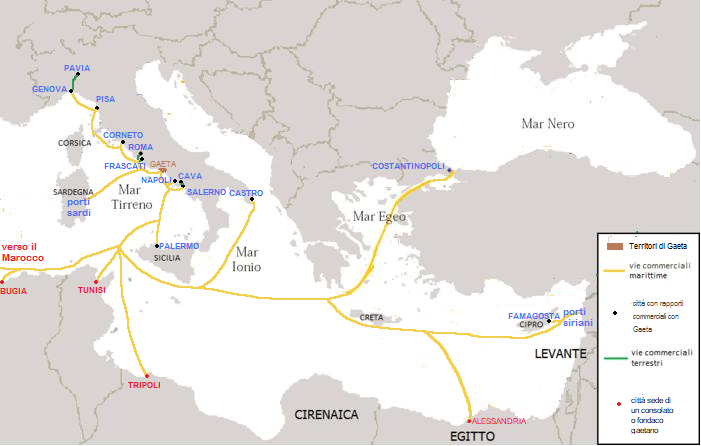
Gaeta's main trade routes in the Mediterranean

The city of Gaeta was always the economic, political, and ecclesiastical centre of the duchy. The probable origins of the Docibilan dynasty as Amalfitan merchants perhaps explains the interest they had in amassing movable as well as landed wealth. The Gaetan forum (market) was located near the ducal palace. Warehouses (medialocae), some even owned by foreigners, like Pisans, were commonplace. In the tenth century Gaetans, Amalfitans, and Salernitans were present cum magno negotio ("with great business") in Pavia. At Constantinople the Gaetans had a colony. Liutprand of Cremona even records that Constantine VII claimed the support of the "men of Caieta" and Amalfi against his brothers-in-law after the deposition of Romanos I Lekapenos. While it is known that Amalfi imported Byzantine silk, a single reference to "Gaetan silk" in a will of 1028 suggests that Gaeta may have been involved in its production. By 1129 the Jewish community at Gaeta was heavily involved in the industries of cloth-dyeing, salt extraction, and olive oil production.

The replacement of the Docibilan dynasty in the mid-eleventh century caused a municipal power shift which had implications for trade and commerce. The established nobility, whose wealth was based on land, was displaced by the families of the rising merchant class, whose new wealth was got by trade. These new families had established ties with Ptolemy I of Tusculum by 1105. The Crescentii, the traditional rivals of the Tusculani in Rome, had taken over Terracina, formerly Gaetan territory, and were establishing martial ties with the Docibilans still ruling at Fondi in the late eleventh century. These two Roman families were soon vying for influence among the merchant clans of Gaeta; the Crescentii appeared to have had upper hand.

In the twelfth century Gaetan trade expanded, while the duchy's Norman dukes took less interest in the city itself. In 1128 Gaeta is recorded as paying less, only twelve denarii, for docking a ship at Genoa than any other city (Amalfi, Naples, Rome, or Salerno), perhaps suggesting longstanding relations with Genoa. The Gaetan–Genoese relationship had deteriorated by 1140, when, according to Caffaro di Rustico:

In this same consulate two Gaetan ships came to plunder the province of Genoa. So two Genoese ships were armed, and following them found them at Arzentarium (probably Monte Argentario), and captured one, taking its men and all its plunder back to Genoa.

During the period of the consuls, Gaeta seems to have been heavily involved in piracy, if with little permanent success. The consuls are often recorded acting to restore merchandise to foreigners. There is reference to a war with the city of Salerno and to apparent commercial rivalry, resulting in piracy, with Atrani.

== Consulate ==
In 1094 a major shift in the government of Gaeta was first recorded. In that year boni homines ("good men") first took part in the political process. In 1123 consuls, four in number, are first recorded, though the dukes had always borne the consular title as an imperial honorific. This makes Gaeta one of the "more precocious cities" by Daniel Waley's criteria. The use of consuls may have been the result of Genoese or Pisan influence, though consuls from Rome were recorded participating in Gaetan affairs in 1127. The record of consular government in Gaeta lasts only until 1135. Two general factions can be defined: those families aligned with the Crescentii and those aligned with the Tusculani. The former dominated the consulate.

In 1123 Duke Richard II confirmed the copper coinage and promised the consuls not to change it. In 1127 the building that housed the curia he ceded to them. The submission in 1135 and death in 1140 of the last Gaetan duke correspond, respectively, with the last consular record and the failed attack on Genoa. It is probably that increased Norman oversight of Gaetan affairs is responsible for the eclipse of both the consuls and the pirates.

== See also ==
- List of dukes of Gaeta
