= Encastellation =

Medieval territorial process

Encastellation (sometimes castellation, which can also mean crenellation) is the process whereby the feudal kingdoms of Europe became dotted with castles, from which local lords could dominate the countryside of their fiefs and their neighbours', and from which kings could command even the far-off corners of their realms. The ubiquity of the castle is iconic of the Middle Ages.

The process was rather quick once the castle, as a distinct type of fortress, was introduced. However, it took different forms in different lands. The methods and reasons of encastellation differed based on law (who could legally build a castle), necessity (who needed a castle), and geography (where could castles be effectively built). The stone castle originated probably in the north of France in the tenth century. Older wooden castles, of the motte-and-bailey variety are probably older, though they were far more common until well into the twelfth century.

== France ==
In France, encastellation began in the north, in Normandy and Anjou, under the direction both of local barons as well as the Duke of Normandy and the Count of Anjou. Most of these castles were of the motte-and-bailey type, which could be constructed with ease in a few months. Stone castles, however, were built before the end of the tenth century in Anjou. These were originally nothing more than towers, donjons (whence dungeon) or keeps. The reason for this proliferation was to provide oneself with protection in times of war, primarily as a place of refuge, but also as a strategic headquarters: a place from which to sally forth to raid and plunder before retreating to safety (again, the castle). For example, in Normandy:

Because [Hugh of Abbeville's peers] were not all lords of castles, [he] became more powerful than the rest of his peers. For he could do what he liked without fear, relying on the protection of the castle, while others, if they tried anything, were easily overcome as they had no refuge.

From Normandy and Anjou, encastellation spread to the Loire Valley. In Poitou, there were thirty nine castles by the eleventh century, the constructions primarily of local magnates. Fortification had briskly increased in Gaul during the Viking Age (see Edict of Pistres) and this merely continued apace while the Carolingian dynasty declined in importance and regional control devolved to regional lords.

In Languedoc and the south of France, there were more serious attempts, the Peace and Truce of God movements, to curb feudal warfare. But with the spread of heresy came the spread of castles as fortresses to which heretic barons could flee, such as the "five sons of Carcassonne."

== Italy ==
In Italy, the process of encastellation is known as incastellamento. It has a specific notion, as the incastellamento describes less the building of castles than the change towards fortified settlements, in which the castle proper (rocca) is a separate part. The term 'incastellamento' for this process was coined by Pierre Toubert. As in France, it was a different process in the north and the south.

In the north, the castles were originally the seats of the barons. They spread quickly after the disruption of royal authority in Italy in the mid-tenth century. By the eleventh century, the territorial magnates, like the margrave of Tuscany, were supreme and castles dotted the landscape. With the rise of the city-states after the collapse of Tuscan power in the early twelfth century, the powerful merchant families began to construct fortress and towers as residences in the cities. Well-preserved San Gimignano was the result of the struggle between Guelphs and Ghibellines.

In the centre of the peninsula, the Papal States, the agents of encastellation were not large territorial magnates, but the petty nobles who belonged to various families and factions usually associated with Rome in some way. The Crescentii and the Tusculani constructed fortresses throughout Latium to dominate the roads leading to the Eternal City and the Vatican. During the papal nadir of the tenth and eleventh centuries, their hilltop fortresses gave these minor lords far more power than their territories would otherwise permit. In Rome itself, encastellation often led to the fortifying of the ancient monuments which had fallen into disuses, such as the Arch of Constantine and the Colosseum. These fortresses were usually in the hands of one of the powerful lay families, but sometimes of the popes.

In the Mezzogiorno, the independent principalities of the Lombards and the Italian city-states, which distanced themselves from any central authority, formed an opportune place for the proliferation of castles. Indeed, the nominally Byzantine duchies of Gaeta, Naples, and Amalfi grew around what were originally small coastal fortresses. The decline of ducal authority in these places has been blamed on the tendency to give outlying regions to younger sons (e.g. Docibilis II of Gaeta granting Fondi to Marinus), who then built their own fortresses and thus became independent in fact. Historian G. A. Loud considers incastellamento as one of the chief reasons for the decline in princely influence in Benevento and Capua (especially the former) during the late tenth century. Historian Barbara Kreutz notes the encastellation of the monastic estates which dominated south Italian politics and contributed to the constant confiscation and invasion of monastic estates as lay barons sought to increase their power against their foes during the war-filled eleventh and twelfth centuries. The arrival of the Normans, adept castle-builders, in the early eleventh century only exacerbated the tendency toward fortification of every hilltop. Together with the Prince of Salerno, they subdued Calabria and encastellated its mountainous territory, leading to the inevitable invasion of Sicily.

== Spain ==
Encastellation in medieval Spain followed a different pattern from most of Western Europe. Development rather than emerging under similar conditions, it developed in context of the long frontier between the Christian Kingdom and the Muslim polities of Al-Andalus. The construction and occupation of castles on the Iberian Peninsula was linked not only to feudal lordship and aristocratic competition, but also to frontier warfare, territorial expansion, settlement and royal administration during the Reconquista.

The earliest phase of Iberian encastellation began in the eighth and ninth centuries, as both Christian and Muslim rulers fortified vulnerable frontier zones. The Muslims built extensive network of hill forts, castles, fortified citadels and watchtowers to secure communication routes and defend strategic territory. In many areas late conquered by Christian rulers from the eleventh century onwards, these Islamic fortifications were retained, enlarged or rebuilt rather than abandoned, producing a continuity of military landscape uncommon elsewhere in Europe.

Among the Christian Kingdoms, encastellation was especially pronounced in the country and later Kingdom of Castile, whose name comes from the large number of castles established along the frontier with Al-Andalus. During the tenth century, the counts of Castile, particularly Fernán González, encouraged the construction and maintenance of fortified settlements to secure newly occupied territory and protect frontier communities. Castile frequently served as administrative centre from which surrounding district were governed and defended.

Unlike parts of France, where castles were often built by competing local lords, many Iberian fortifications were established under royal authority or with royal approval. The Monarchs of León, Castile, Navarre, Aragon and Portugal integrated castles into broader frontier defense system, using them to control roads, river crossings, mountain passes and newly conquered territory. The growth of castles therefore reflected both military necessity and the expansion of centralised political authority.

Encastellation also accompanied the process of repopulation, where Christian rulers encouraged settlement in conquered territories. Castles became focal points for new towns, whose inhabitants often received municipal charters granting privileges in exchange for military service and frontier defense. This relationship between fortification, colonisation and urban development distinguished much of Iberian encastellation from contemporary developments elsewhere in Europe.

From the twelfth century onwards, the military orders, including the Orders of Santiago, Calatrava and Alcántara and the Knight Templars, became major agents of encastellation in central and southern Iberia. They built, repaired and administered extensive networks of castles guarding frontier districts and strategic routes, while also promoting settlement and agricultural development within their territories.

Regional patterns nevertheless varied considerably. In Catalonia and Aragon, castles formed part of a defensive system of the Spanish March, established under Carolingian influence, whereas in Leon and Galicia many fortifications developed for earlier hilltop strongholds. In the south, numerous Christian castles incorporated or replaced earlier Islamic fortifications, producing architectural forms that combined Romanesque, Islamic and later Gothic military traditions.

By the thirteenth century, following the major Christian conquest of the Guadalquivir valley and Murcia, the strategic frontier moved southward and many earlier castles lost their military importance. Increasingly, castles became centres of seigneurial administration and symbols of aristocratic authority, although frontier fortifications remained significant until the completion of the Reconquista with the conquest of Granada in 1492.

== Britain ==
True medieval castles were a somewhat later arrival in Britain than in continental Europe. The process of encastellation in Britain is as inextricably linked to Normanisation (which is, of course, linked to the Norman Conquest) as the encastellation of Spain is to the Reconquista.

=== England ===
Prior to the Norman conquest of 1066, English fortification was dominated by the Burh, a commune defensive settlement established under Alfred the great and his successors in response to Viking incursions. Burhs typically incorporated towns and their surrounding population under collective defense, in contrast to the private strongholds characteristic of continental Europe. While certain late Anglo Saxon elites maintained fortified residence, the continental model of the castle, a privately controlled stronghold combining military, administrative and symbolic functions, had not become established in England before 1066.

The conquest inaugurated a programme of fortification subsequently termed encastellation, whereby castles served as instruments of conquest and political consolidation. In the aftermath of the Battle of Hastings, William the Conqueror and his followers erected castles as strategically significant sites throughout England to secure territory, suppress opposition and assert the legitimacy of the Norman regime. Early example were built at points of invasion and communication, including Pevensey, Hastings, and Dover, as well as within major centres such as London, York, Lincoln and Norwich.

The predominant form of early Norman castle was the motte-and-bailey, an earthen mound, either constructed or adapted from existing typography, surmounted by a timber tower, and paired with an enclosed bailey protected by a ditch and palisade. owing to their reliance on local material and labour, such structures could be raised quickly, rendering them well suited to the demands of military occupation. Sites were frequently selected to command settlements, road networks, river crossings and former seats of Anglo Saxon administration.

Castle construction was closely bound up with the reorganisation of landholding under the emerging Norman feudal system. Tenant in chief, granted extensive estates by the Crown, established castles as centres of military, administrative and judicial authority. Royal castles functioned as expressions of Crown authority, while baronial castles consolidated the power of individual lords over territories acquired following the conquest. Castles were often sites within or adjacent to existing towns, enabling Norman authorities to exert control over established centres of economic and political activity.

During the late 11th and 12th centuries, timber fortifications were increasingly rebuilt in stone. the construction of stone keeps, among them the White Tower at the Tower of London, and the keep at Rochester Castle, both the growing wealth of the crown and aristocracy and a broader shift towards permanence and architectural display. Stone castles thereby functioned not only as a defensive structure but as statements of status and legitimacy.

Castle building intensified during periods of political instability, most notably the civil war known as the Anarchy (1135–1154), Faught between the supporters of King Stephen and the Empress Matilda. Weakened royal authority during this period led to a marked proliferation of unlicensed private castles, a phenomenon noted by contemporary chroniclers. Following his accession in 1154, King Henry II undertook the destruction or confiscation of many such unauthorised fortifications, reasserting royal control over the practice of castle building.

From the later 12th century, English castle design evolved beyond the simple keep-and-bailey model, incorporating more elaborated gatehouses, thicker curtains walls and increasingly sophisticated defensive features. At the same time, castles assumed a growing role as aristocrat residence and administrative centres. alongside their continued military function. The requirement for royal licences to crenellate, permission to fortify or strengthen a building, reflected the persistent association between fortification and political authority.

By the late medieval period, developments in siege warfare, particular the advent of gunpowder artillery, diminished the military effectiveness of traditional castle design. Many existing castles were subsequently adapted to residential purposes, while new fortifications were designed with artillery defence, rather than height and mass, as their primary consideration. Despite this decline in military relevance, the process of encastellation had left a lasting mark on the English landscape, embodying the political and social transformation wrought by the Norman conquest.

=== Wales ===
Encastellated in Wales refers to the widespread construction of castles across Wales, beginning with the Norman advance into Welsh territory in the late 11th century and continuing through the English conquest of the 13th century. Castles became a defining feature of the Welsh landscape, functioning as centres of military power, lordship and administration. Although introduced by the Normans, castle building was subsequently adopted by native Welsh rulers and reached its greatest extent under Edward I of England following his conquest of Wales.

==== Norman expansion ====
After the Norman conquest of England in 1066, Norman lords pushed into the Welsh borderlines, building castles to secure captured territory and protect lines of communications. Most early fortifications were timber motte-and-bailey castles, which could be built quickly from local materials. they served both as bases for further campaigns and as administrative centres for the new lordship.

the first concentration of castles developed in the Welsh Marches before spreading into southern and eastern Wales. Castles at Chepstow, Cardiff and Pembroke became centres of Norman authority and their position at river crossing, coastal routes, and fertile valleys allowed Norman lords to control both military movement and economic resources, underpinning the gradual establishment of the marcher lordship.

==== Native Welsh castle-building ====
During the 12th and 13th centuries, Wales rulers increasingly turned to castle construction as means of controlling territory. Royal Courts (llysoedd) and hillforts remained important, but permanent castles offered greater protection against both rival Welsh princes and Norman incursion. Rulers of Gwynedd, notably Llywelyn the Great and his grandson Llywelyn ap Gruffudd, built or extended several stone castles including Dolbadarn, Dolwyddelan, and Criccieth. these were generally smaller than contemporary Norman fortresses but were well suited to the mountainous terrain of north Wales, making use of steep slopes and natural rock outcrops. Native Welsh caste typically combined military strength with the practical needs of princely government.

==== Stone castles and military development ====
From the late 12th century timber castles were gradually replaced by stone fortifications. Developments in siege warfare led to thicker curtain walls, gatehouses, mural towers, and more sophisticated defensive layouts. Stone castles also served as visible statements of political power, signaling the permanence and wealth of those who built them. Many earlier earth and timber castles were rebuilt in stone during this period and new fortifications were raised at strategically important sites. Castle designs in Wales increasingly mirrored broader developments in military architecture across western Europe.

==== Edward I and the conquest of Wales ====
The most significant phase of encastellation followed Edward I's campaigns of 1277–1283, which brought about the conquest of the independent Welsh principalities. To secure his new territories, Edward launched one of the most ambitious castles building programmes in medieval Europe. Under the master mason James of Saint George, a Savoyard, a network of large concentric castles was built or substantially rebuilt at Caernarfon, Conwy, Harlech, and Beaumaris. These fortresses combined advanced military architecture with clear expressions of royal authority and were closely tied to newly founded English boroughs established alongside them. Linked by sea communications, the castles formed a coordinated defensive system that allowed supplies and reinforcement to reach garrisons quickly. Their scale reflected both military necessity and Edward's determination to consolidate English rule over Wales.

==== Administrative and economic roles ====
Beyond their military function, castles served as administrative centres, residences, courts, and economic hubs. They housed officials who collected rents and taxes, administered justice and governed the surrounding lordship. Markets and planned towns often grew up alongside castles, encouraging trade and settlement while reinforcing royal or lordly authority. In both Norman and English controlled areas of Wales, castles became focal points of local government, combining military occupation with civil administration.

==== Decline and legacy ====
By the late Middle Ages, changes in military technology and shifting political circumstances reduces the strategic importance of many Welsh castles. Some were damaged during the revolt of Owain Glyndŵr in the early 15th century and others were deliberately slighted during the English Civil War to prevent their future military use. many fell into ruin but survived as prominent landmarks and during the 18th and 19th centuries they became celebrated within the Romantic movement as picturesque symbols of Wales's medieval past. Wales today has one of the most highest concentrations of medieval castles in Europe and several, including Caernarfon, Conwy, Harlech, and Beaumaris, from part of the UNESCO World Heritage Site "Castles and Town Walls of King Edward in Gwynedd."

=== Scotland ===
The development of castles in Scotland was a gradual and regionally varied process that became particularly significant during the 12th century. The earliest known Scottish mottes date from the reign of David I (1124–1153), when new forms of lordship and landholding were being established alongside the expansion of royal authority. Earth and timber castles often consisting of a motte and a associated enclosure or bailey, became an important mean by which lords occupied, defended and displayed control over their estates. Mottes were not purely military structures, their prominent earthworks and associated residences could also serve as symbols of lordship and as centres for the administration of territory.

The emergence of castles was probably was closely associated with the creation of new aristocracy lordship, including those granted to Anglo-Norman and other immigrant families. One of the clearest examples is Annandale, which David I granted to Robert de Brus in 1124. the Brus family established major strongholds at Annan and Lochmaben, while a number of smaller timber castles were established within the lordship. These sites formed part of a wider political landscape in which royal authority was being extended and routes through southwest were being secured. Similar processes can be seen elsewhere, although the precise relationship between castle building, royal authority and immigrant aristocracy varied considerably between regions.

Galloway was particularly important in this process. The region retained powerful local political traditions, the establishment of castles formed part of the wider efforts of the Scottish monarchy and aristocracy to control the southwest. The concentration of 12th century fortified earthworks at in Dumfries and Galloway reflects the strategic importance of the region and the communications with the Solway and the Clyde. In this context, castles served not only as defensive structures but also as visible centres of newly established lordship.

A comparable process occurred in Moray. Following the rebellion of the men of Moray against David I in 1130, the Flemish settler Freskin was granted the estate of Duffus, where he established an earth and timber castle. The subsequent rise of the de Moravia family illustrated how castle building could accompany the settlement of new aristocratic families and the consolidation of royal authority in regions where the monarchy's control had previously been contested. the first castle at Duffus was a large motte and Bailey structure, it was eventually replaced by a substantial stone castle.

The spread of castles should not, however, be understood simply as the imposition of uniform "Norman" model upon Scotland. evidence indicates considerable regional variation in the form and chronology of high status residence and fortified sites. although mottes are prominent among early Scottish castles, other forms of timber fortification, including ringwork and other defensive residences, also existed. At Green of Invermay in Perthshire, for example, archaeological evidence has been interpreted as a possible medieval ringwork and significant elite residence. The Scottish Archaeological Research Framework therefore cautions against explaining the adoption of castles solely through royal centralisation and the "Normanisation" of the Scottish elite, particularly outside the borders.

The relationship between castles and native Scottish elite was similarly complex. Some castles were associated with newly established immigrant aristocrats, while others were adopted or developed by established local lords. In regions such as Perthshire, the evidence for early castle building is relatively sparse despite the existence of powerful native lordship. This suggests that the adoption of castles was not an inevitable consequence of feudalisation and that castle formed only one among several ways in which medieval elites expressed and experienced power.

The earliest castles were predominantly constructed from earth and timber, but stone became gradually more important from the 13th century. At Duffus, for instance, the original 12th-century timber castle was eventually replaced by a substantial stone keep and curtain walls. The transition to stone did not represent a simple replacement of one type of castle by another; rather existing centres of lordship were often rebuilt, enlarged or otherwise transformed as the political and architectural requirements of the aristocracy changed.

Castle building also developed differently in areas that were outside the direct authority of the Scottish crown. Orkney and Shetland remained under Norwegian rule until the later 15th century, and their medieval elite residence therefore developed within a Norsepolitical context. Cubbie Roo's Castle on Wyre, Orkney, is particularly significant, according to the Orkneyinga Saga, it was built in 1145 by the Norse aristocrat Kolbein Hruga and is regarded by Historic Environment Scotland as the earliest medieval documented stone castle in Scotland. Its existence demonstrates that the development of stone castles in the region cannot be explained solely through the arrival of Anglo-Norman aristocrats in the Scottish kingdom.

By the later Middle Ages, castle have become an established feature of the Scottish political and social landscape. Their function extended beyond warfare to include aristocrat residence administration, the display of status and the organisation of estates. The development of castles in Scotland was not a single process of "Norman" introduction, but a longer and uneven transformation in which royal government, aristocratic settlement, indigenous lordship, regional politics and changing architectural practices all played a part.

=== Ireland ===
In Ireland, encastellation was closely tied to the Anglo-Norman invasion of 1169-1171 though the Irish has already began to experiment with fortified residence, before the Norman had arrived. In 1124, Tairdelbach Ó Conchobair, king of Connacht, began building castles in a form so unfamiliar that Irish annalists coined new terms such as: caisteóil, caislén, caistél, to describe them and Diarmait Mac Murchada, the deposed king of Leinster who would later invite the Anglo-Norman into Ireland, built a stone "tech cloiche" (stone house) of his own.

As in Britain, the great majority of the Anglo-Norman castles that were built in Ireland were motte-and-bailey fortifications. earthen mound topped with timber tower, often paired with an enclosed bailey defended by a ditch and palisade. Roughly 400 mottes survive across the island today, with about 160 retaining an identifiable bailey, concentrated in the lordship curved out of the crown's leading tenants-in-chief, Richard de Clare ("Strongbow"), who was granted most of Leinster and Hugh de Lacy, who was granted the lordship of Meath.

Rather than isolated frontier outposts, these mottes chiefly served as seigneurial caputs, the residences and administrative centres and in some cases charted boroughs, of the lordly and knightly class who settled Ireland after 1169. A related but less common earthwork, the ringwork castle, a circular or sub-circular enclosure defines by banks and ditches rather than a raised mound, is also attested in Ireland, though such sites are difficult to distinguish from earlier ringforts without excavation.

Contrary to the once common assumption that Irish castles were uniformly built in timber before a later transition to stone, some stone construction began remarkably early. Hugh de Lacy began building Trim Castle, which became the largest Anglo-Norman stone castle in Ireland, its keep encircled by a curtain wall and a moat fed from the River Boyne, almost as soon as he received his grant of Meath. Meanwhile John de Courcy built a large but architecturally simpler stone residence in Carrickfergus to secure the Ulster coastline and Theobald Walter, ancestor of the Butler family, raised a distinctive great round tower at Nenagh.

Lesser lords also built in stone from an early date, including the Geraldines at Shanid and Croom, County Limerick, the Talbots at Malahide, and the Tyrrells at Castleknock, while the crown itself invested in castles at towns that remained in royal hands, such as Dublin, Limerick, Dungarvan and Roscrea. The great period of Anglo-Norman stone castles building in Ireland nonetheless came in the 13th century. Strongbow's successors, the Marshal earls of Pembroke, built major fortresses at Ferns, Carlow, Kilkenny, Dunamase and Lea, while John de Courcy began Dundrum before his defeat by the de Lacys, who went on to build Carlingford Castle and (probably) Greencastle on either shore of Carlingford Lough; their allies the de Verdons raised Castleroche north of Dundalk. As the de Burgh family's power grew in Connacht over the century, they reinforced it with castles at Athenry, Ballintober and Ballymote, and, after acquiring the earldom of Ulster, a second Greencastle overlooking Lough Foyle.

Castle building in the Anglo-Norman colony slowed markedly during the 14th century amid economy and political decline, driven in part due to the Great European Famine, the Black Death, and the Bruce invasion and it was only as conditions improved in the following centuries that construction resumed in earnest, now chiefly in the form of the tower house. Unlike the earlier motte-and-bailey and great stone castles, tower houses were compact, square residential towers with a vaulted ground floor and typically three upper storeys, often attached to a wall enclosure known as Bawn (from the Irish badhún, "cattle enclosure"). Their builders were rarely the great territorial lords of the initial conquest, but rather the gentry, prosperous rural clergy, and in towns such as Galway and Kilkenny wealthy merchants; as Gaelic lords recovered land and intermarried with Anglo-Norman families in the Middle-Ages, they too adopted the tower house, so that many of the several thousand examples surviving in Ireland were built buy Gaelic rather than by Anglo-Norman patrons.

== Germany ==
In the Holy Roman Empire, castle building was driven less by a single monarch then by competition between the Crown and territorial nobility. The Investiture Controversy of the eleventh century and the weakening of royal authority that came with it, allowed local lords to claim rights that have formally belonged to the king, and castle building increased as they consolidated their small lordships.

Under the Staufer the process became more systematic. In the southern Palatinate, for example, there were few castles around Annweiler before the twelfth century and those that existed such as the Madenburg, dated to the Salian period. From the twelfth century the Staufer started an extensive castle building programme as part of the internal development of their lands, expanding the imperial castle of Trifels Castle under Henry VI, Holy Roman Emperor (1195–1200) and Henry (VII) (1230–1235) and founding or extending neighbouring castles such as Anebos and Scharfenberg.

The holders of these castles were often prominent officials of the Empire, the lords of Anebos served as imperial marshals, while the lords of Scharfenberg served as chancellors and as guardians of the imperial regalia. In the east, encastellation formed part of the settlement of the Baltic lands during the Northern Crusades of the twelfth and thirteenth centuries.

The Teutonic Order, which arrived in Prussia around 1230, found a region with almost no tradition of masonry building or urban settlement. The first fortifications were of timber, but the Order went on to build a dense network of brick castles and the adoption of the commandery castle as the standard form gave the Prussians castle architecture an unusually uniform character. Known as Ordensburgen (castles of an order) these served as the seats of the order's officials and as bases of administrating the conquered territory. The Order's capital, Marienburg (Malbork), was extended in two main phases in the 1340s and the 1370s and by the 1330s the order had established the office of master mason to coordinate the building of its brick castles.

== Sources ==
- Gravett, Christopher, and Nicolle, David. The Normans: Warrior Knights and their Castles. Osprey Publishing: Oxford, 2006.
- Incastellamento.
- Hariulf. Gesta ecclesiae Centulensis.
- Painter, Sidney. A History of the Middle Ages 284-1500. New York, 1953.
- Loud, G. A. The American Historical Review, Vol. 98, No. 2. (Apr., 1993), pp 480–481.
- Kreutz, Barbara M. Before the Normans: Southern Italy in the Ninth and Tenth Centuries. Philadelphia: University of Pennsylvania Press, 1991.
- Pierre Toubert: Les structures du Latium médiéval. Le Latium méridional et la Sabine du 9e siècle à la fin du 12e siècle, Rom 1973.
