= Gaeta =

- Comune
- Comune di Gaeta
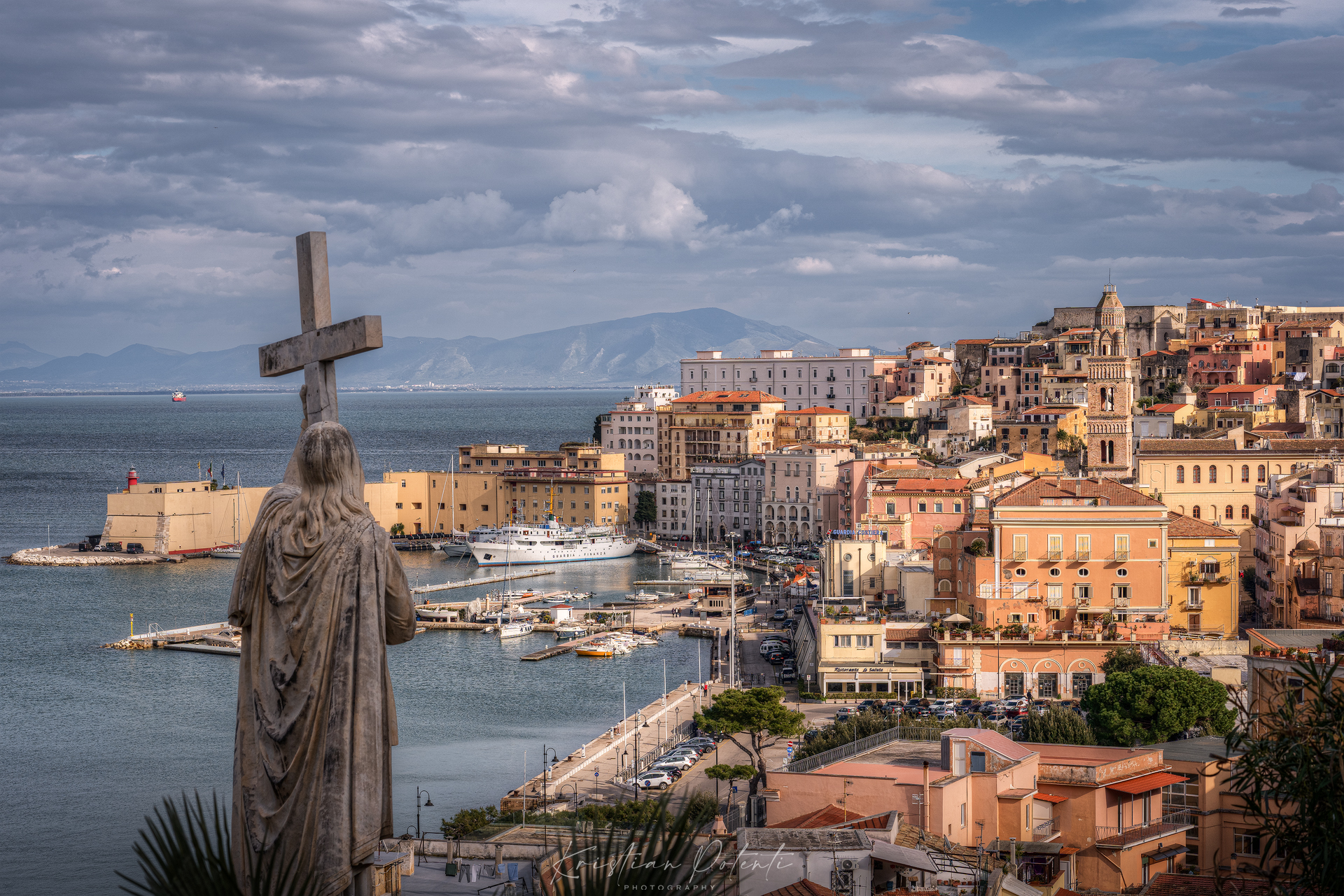
- View of the historic center of Gaeta from the Temple of St. Francis

- Flag Coat of arms

- Location within Italy Location within Lazio
- Coordinates: 41°13′N 13°34′E
- Country: Italy
- Region: Lazio
- Province: Latina

Government
  - Mayor: Cristian Leccese

Area
  - Total: 29.2 km^{2} (11.3 sq mi)

Population (31/10/2023)
  - Total: 19,321
  - Density: 662/km^{2} (1,710/sq mi)
- Demonym: Gaetani (singular: Gaetano)
- Time zone: UTC+1 (CET)
  - Summer (DST): UTC+2 (CEST)
- Postal code: 04024
- Patron saint: Saint Erasmus
- Saint day: 2 June
- Website: Official website

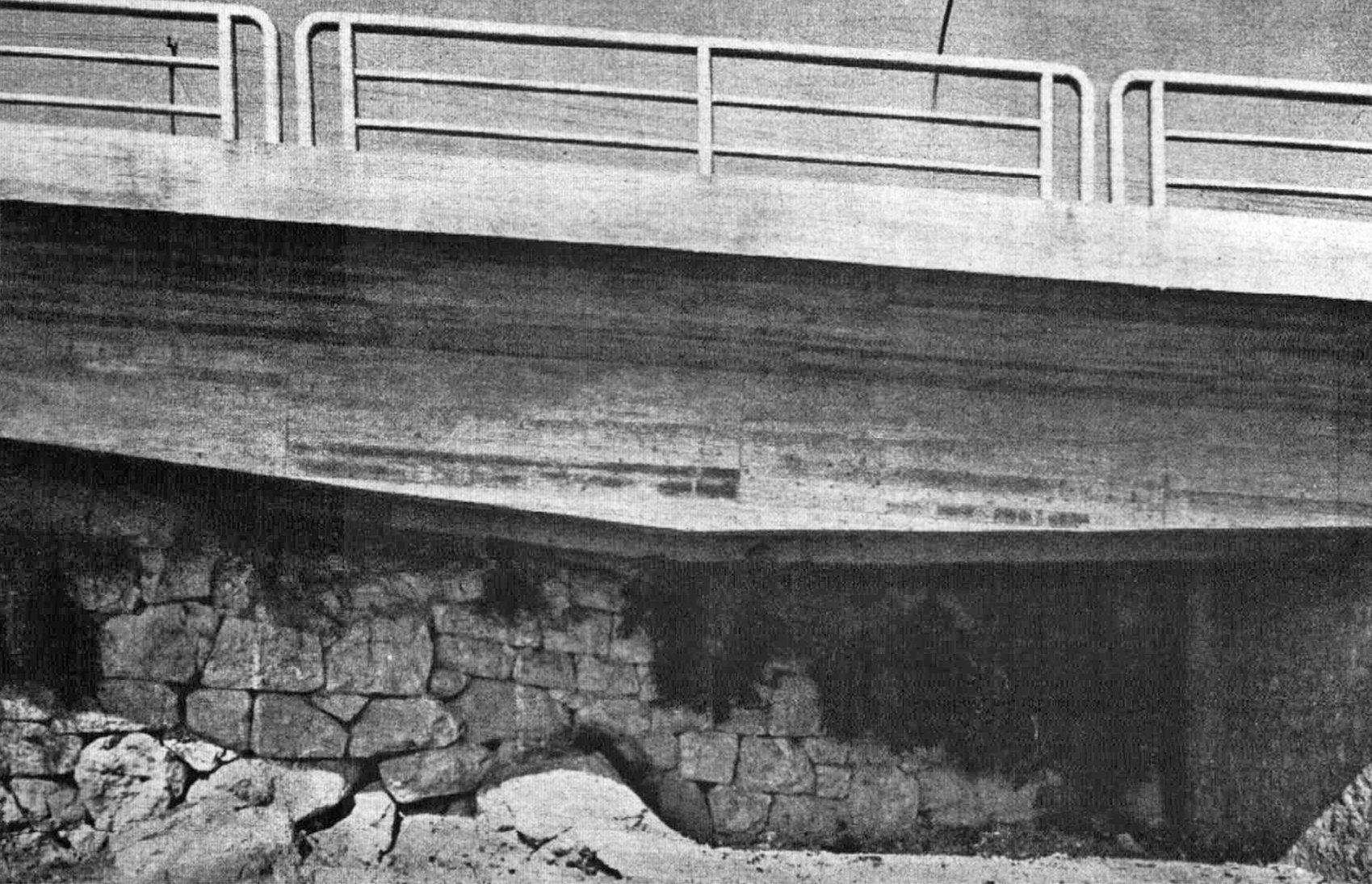
Megalithic walls

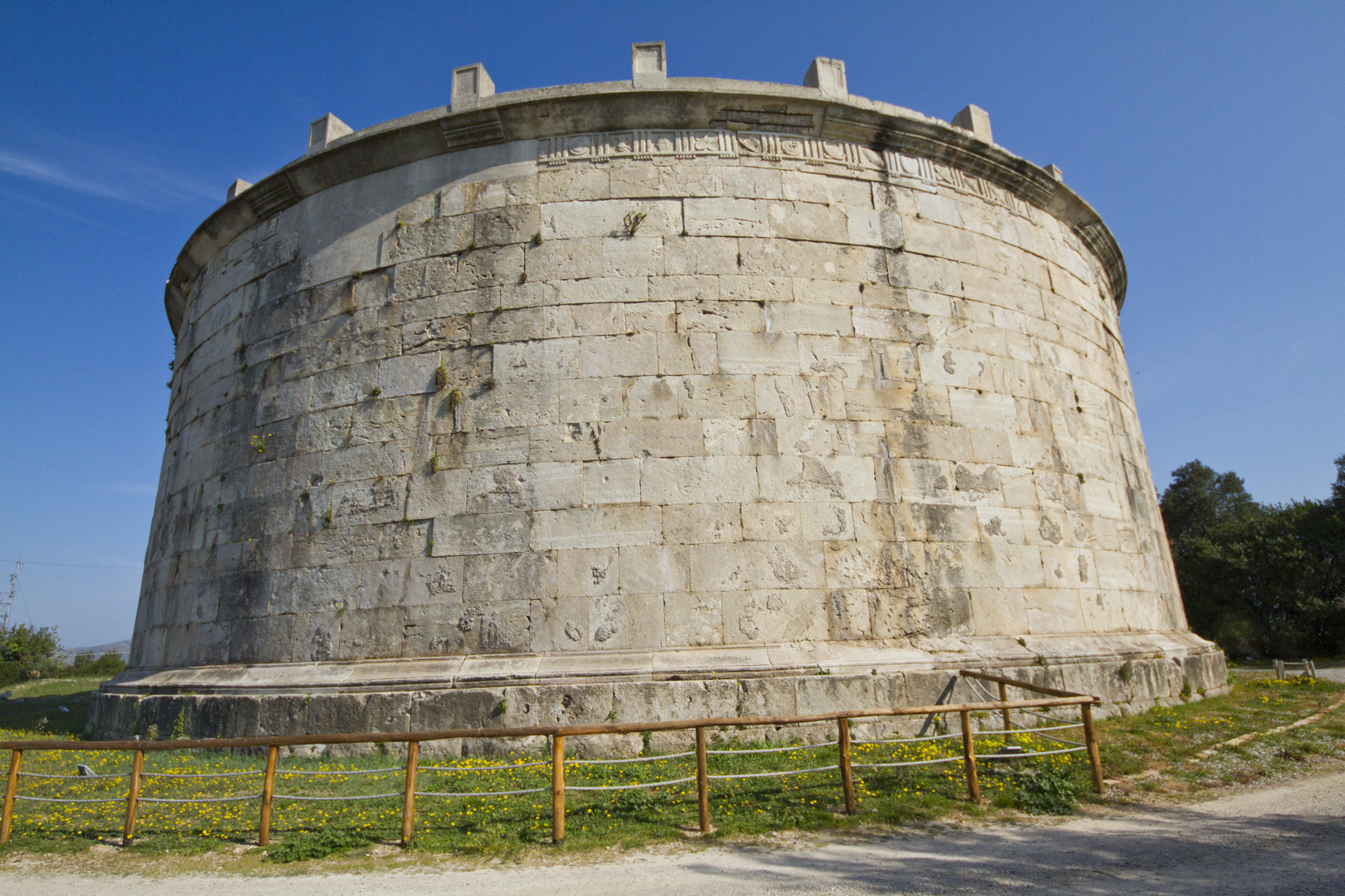
Roman mausoleum of Lucius Munatius Plancus

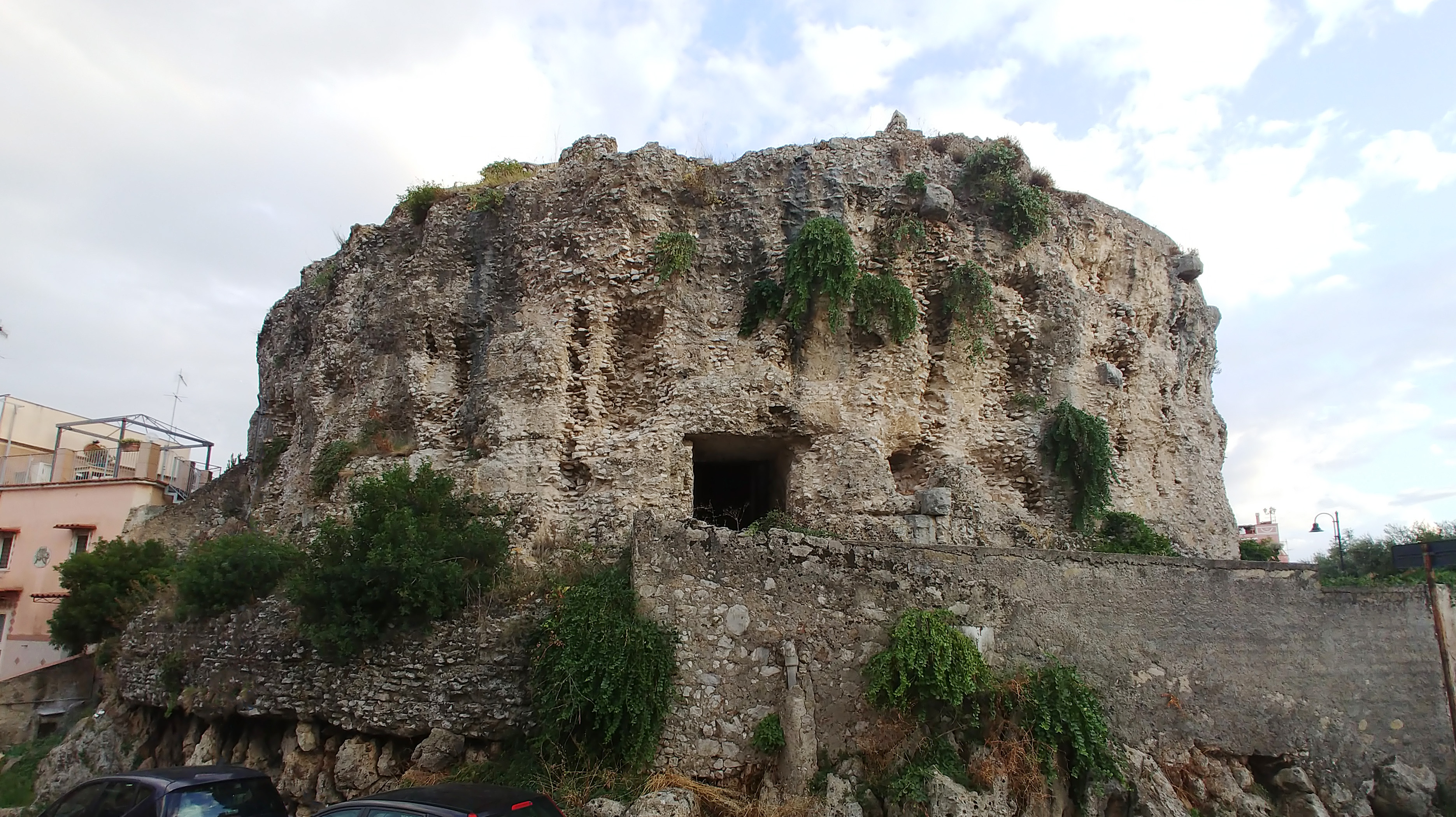
Roman mausoleum of Lucius Sempronius Atratinus

Gaeta (Italian: [ɡaˈeːta]; Latin: Caieta; Southern Laziale: Gaieta) is a seaside resort in the province of Latina in Lazio, Italy. Set on a promontory stretching towards the Gulf of Gaeta, it is 133 km (83 mi) south of Rome and 96.5 km (60 mi) north of Naples.

The city has played a conspicuous part in military history; its walls date to Roman times and were extended and strengthened in the 15th century, especially throughout the history of the Kingdom of Naples (later the Kingdom of the Two Sicilies).

Present-day Gaeta is a fishing port and a seaside resort. NATO has a naval base here. In 2025, it received the blue and green flags from FEE for the twelfth consecutive year. It is one of the I Borghi più belli d'Italia ("The most beautiful villages of Italy").

== History ==
=== Ancient times ===
Ancient Caieta was situated on the slopes of the Torre di Orlando, a promontory overlooking the Mediterranean Sea. It was inhabited by the Oscan-speaking Italic tribe of the Aurunci tribe by the 10th-9th century BC. Only in 345 BC did the territory of Gaeta come under Rome's influence.

Caieta, with its temperate climate like the neighbouring Formia and Sperlonga, became one of the earliest locations of villae maritimae, seaside villas and luxurious retreats for the Roman elite owned, for example, by Scipio Africanus (236–183 BC) and Gaius Laelius. Caieta was also linked to the capital of the Roman Empire by the Appian Way and its extension the Via Flacca.

The remains of the monumental villa of Lucius Marcius Philippus, stepfather of Augustus, are in Hotel Irlanda in the Arcella area. Lucius Munatius Plancus (consul in 42 BC) had a vast villa located on Monte Orlando overlooking the Gulf of Gaeta. His mausoleum, built at the end of the 1st century BC, is still an impressive monument inside a large clearing within the villa.

Lucius Sempronius Atratinus probably lived here as indicated by his mausoleum. Atratinus was suffect Consul in 40 and 34 BC, propraetor in Greece in 39 BC, and first admiral of Mark Antony's fleet from 38–34 BC.

In the Roman imperial age, it continued as a popular seaside resort for many important and rich characters of Rome. Emperor Domitian (r. 81–96 AD) also had a villa in the area.

Emperor Antoninus Pius restored the port, given its strategic relevance.

Remains of an aqueduct that supplied the town from the Conca hill can be seen a few metres from the villa of Hortensius.

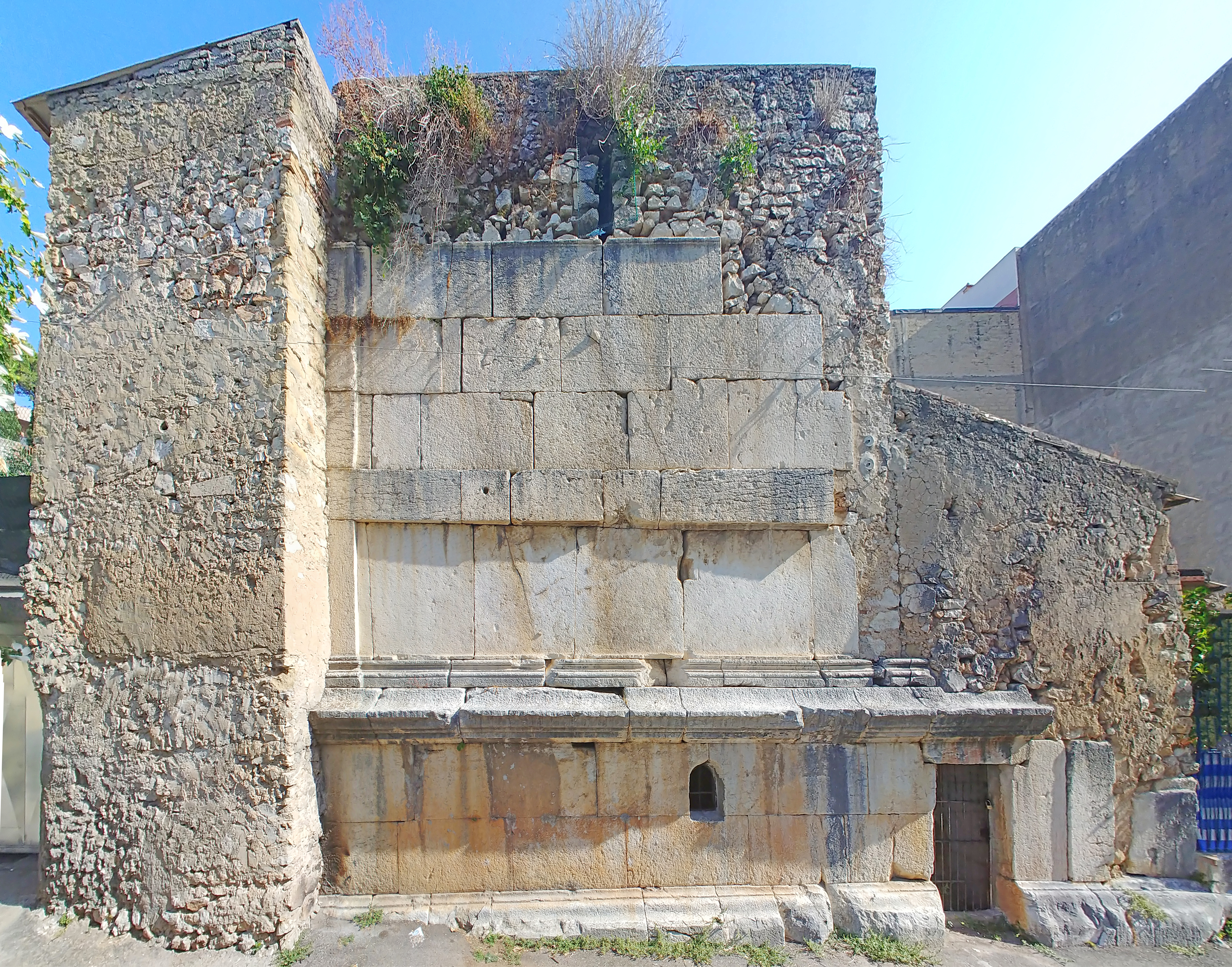
Roman Tomb: "Sepolcreto Marittimo

=== Middle Ages ===
At the beginning of the Middle Ages, after the Lombard invasion, Gaeta remained under the suzerainty of the Byzantine Empire. In the following years, like Amalfi, Sorrento and Naples did, it would seem to have established itself as a practically independent port and to have carried on a thriving trade with the Levant.

As Byzantine influence declined in Southern Italy, the town began to grow. For fear of the Saracens, in 840, the inhabitants of the neighbouring Formiæ fled to Gaeta. Though under the suzerainty of Byzantium, Gaeta had then, like nearby ports Naples and Amalfi, a republican form of government with a dux ("duke" or commanding lord under the command of the Byzantine Exarch of Ravenna), as a strong bulwark against Saracen invasion.

Around 830, it became a lordship ruled by hereditary hypati or consuls: The first of these was Constantine (839–866), who in 847 aided Pope Leo IV in the naval fight at Ostia. At this same time (846), the episcopal see of Gaeta was founded when Constantine, Bishop of Formiae, fled thither and established his residence. He was associated with his son Marinus I. They were probably violently overthrown (they disappeared suddenly from history) in 866 or 867 by Docibilis I, who, looking rather to local safety, entered into treaties with the Saracens and abandoned friendly relations with the papacy. Nevertheless, he greatly expanded the duchy and began the construction of the palace. The greatest of the hypati was possibly John I, who helped crush the Saracens at Garigliano in 915 and gained the title of patricius from the Byzantine Emperor Constantine VII.

The principle of co-regency governed the early dynasties: Docibilis I associated John with him, and John, in turn, associated his son Docibilis II with him. In 933, three generations were briefly co-ruling: John I, Docibilis II, and John II. On the death of Docibilis II (954), who first took the title dux, the duchy passed from its golden age and entered a decline marked by a division of territory. John II ruled Gaeta and his brother, Marinus, ruled Fondi with the equivalent title of duke. Outlying lands and castles were given away to younger sons, and thus the family of the Docibili slowly declined after the mid-century.

Allegedly, but improbably, from the end of the 9th century, the principality of Capua claimed Gaeta as a courtesy title for the younger son of its ruling prince. In the mid-10th century, the De Ceremoniis of Constantine VII lists the ceremonial title "prince of Gaeta" among the protocols for letters written to foreigners.

Prince Pandulf IV of Capua captured Gaeta in 1032 and deposed Duke John V, assuming the ducal and consular titles. In 1038, Prince Guaimar IV of Salerno took it from him and, in 1041, established the Norman counts of Aversa, who were afterwards princes of Capua, as puppet dukes. The native dynasty made a last attempt to wrest the duchy from Guaimar in 1042 under Leo I of Gaeta.

In 1045, the Gaetans elected their Lombard duke, Atenulf I. His son, Atenulf II, was made to submit to the Norman Prince Richard I of Capua in 1062 when Gaeta was captured by Jordan I of Capua. In 1064, the city was placed under a line of puppet dukes, appointed by the Capuan princes, who had usurped the ducal and consular titles. These dukes, usually Italianate Normans, ruled Gaeta with some level of independence until the death of Richard III of Gaeta in 1140. In that year, Gaeta was definitively annexed to the Kingdom of Sicily by Roger II, who bestowed on his son Roger of Apulia, who was duly elected by the nobles of the city. The town did maintain its coinage until as late as 1229 after the Normans had been superseded by the centralising Hohenstaufen.

Gaeta, owing to its important strategic position, was often attacked and defended bravely in the many wars for possession of the Kingdom of the Two Sicilies. In 1194, the Pisans, allies of Emperor Henry VI in the conquest of the kingdom, took possession of the city and held it as their own.

In 1227, Frederick II, who was King of Sicily since 1198, was in the city and strengthened the castle. However, in the struggle between Frederick and the Papacy, in 1228, it rebelled against Frederick II and surrendered to the pope after the Papal forces destroyed the castle in the fray. After the peace of San Germano of 1230, it was returned to the Sicilian kingdom. In 1233, Frederick regained control of the important port and fortress. Following the division between the Kingdom of Sicily, Gaeta became a possession of the new Kingdom of Naples. In 1279, Charles I of Anjou rebuilt the castle and enhanced the fortifications. In 1289, King James II of Aragon besieged the city in vain. From 1378, Gaeta hosted for some years antipope Clement VII. The future King of Naples Ladislaus lived in Gaeta from 1387. Here, on 21 September, he married Costanza Chiaramonte, whom he repudiated three years later.

King Alfonso V of Aragon (as Alfonso I of Naples) made Gaeta his beachhead for the conquest of the Kingdom of Naples in 1435, besieged it, and to his disadvantage, displayed great generosity by aiding those unable to bear arms which had been driven out from the besieged town. After a disastrous naval battle, he captured it and gained control of the kingdom. He enlarged the castle, which became his royal palace, and created a mint. In 1451, the city was home to the Treaty of Gaeta, stipulated between Alfonso V and the Albanian lord, Skanderbeg: the treaty ensured protection of the Albanian lands in exchange for political suzerainty of Skanderbeg to Alfonso.

=== Modern era ===
In 1495, King Charles VIII of France conquered the city and sacked it. The following year, however, Frederick of Naples regained it with a tremendous siege which lasted from 8 September to 18 November. In 1501, Gaeta was retaken by the French; however, after their defeat at the Garigliano (3 January 1504), they abandoned it to Gonzalo Fernández de Córdoba, Ferdinand II of Aragon's general.

In 1528, Andrea Doria, admiral of Charles V, defeated a French fleet in the waters off Gaeta and gave the city to its emperor. Gaeta was thenceforth protected with a new and more extensive wall encompassing Monte Orlando.

In the War of the Spanish Succession, on 30 September 1707, Gaeta was stormed and taken after a three-month siege by the Austrians under General Daun. On 6 August 1734, it was taken by French, Spanish and Sardinian troops under the future King Charles III of Spain after a stubborn defence by the Austrian viceroy of four months. Charles' daughter Infanta Maria Josefa of Spain was born here in 1744. The fortifications were again strengthened; in 1799, the French temporarily occupied it.

On 18 July 1806, the French captured it under André Masséna, after a heroic defence. It was created as a duché grand-fief in the Napoleonic Kingdom of Naples, but under the French name Gaète, for finance minister Martin-Michel-Charles Gaudin, in 1809 (family extinguished in 1841). On 8 August 1815, it capitulated to the Austrians after a three-months siege. It had been attacked and partially reduced by ships of the Royal Navy on 24 July 1815.

After his flight from the Roman Republic, Pope Pius IX took refuge at Gaeta in November 1848. He remained in Gaeta until 4 September 1849.

On 1 August 1849, USS Constitution while in port at Gaeta, received onboard King Ferdinand II and Pope Pius IX, giving them a 21-gun salute. This was the first time a Pope set foot on American territory or its equivalent.

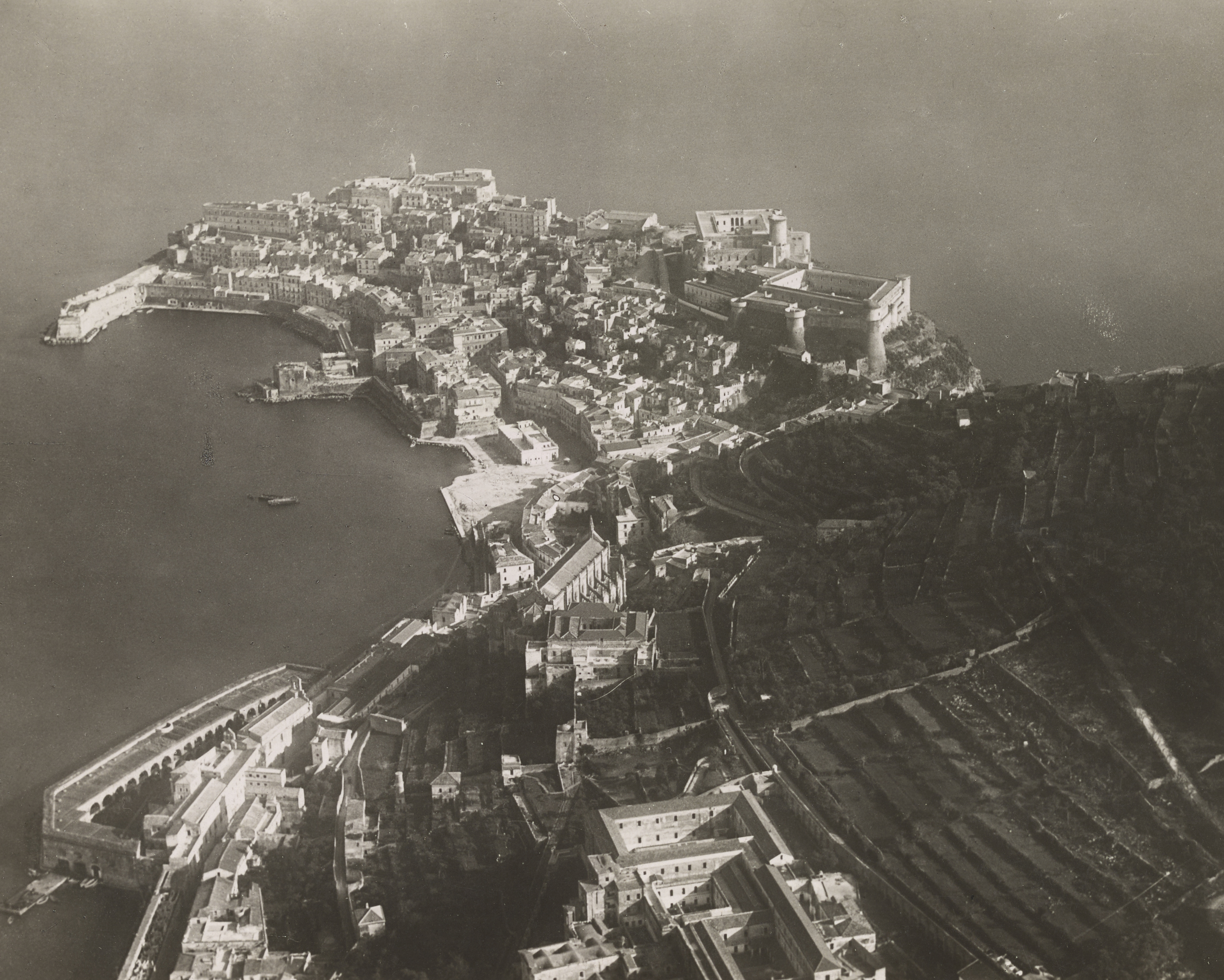
Gaeta by air, between 1917 and 1964

In 1860, Gaeta was the Kingdom of the Two Sicilies' last Northern outpost. During the 1861 siege, King Francis II of the Two Sicilies offered a stubborn defence, shut up in the fortress with 12,000 men and was inspired by the heroic example by his wife Queen Maria Sophie after Giuseppe Garibaldi's occupation of Naples. It was not until 13 February 1861 that Francis II was forced to capitulate when the withdrawal of the French fleet made bombardment from the sea possible, thus sealing the annexation of the Kingdom of the Two Sicilies to the Kingdom of Italy. Enrico Cialdini, the Piedmontese general, received the victory title of Duke of Gaeta. During the functioning of the Government of Montenegro in exile from 1919 to 1924, that supported the Petrović-Njegoš dynasty and opposed the rule of the house of Karađorđević in Yugoslavia (The Greens) were located in Gaeta.

=== Contemporary age ===
Gaeta within the province of Latina

After the Risorgimento and until World War II, Gaeta grew in importance and wealth as a harbour. The nearby town of Elena, separated after the Risorgimento and named after the queen of Italy, was reunited with Gaeta following World War I. Benito Mussolini transferred Gaeta from the southern region known today as Campania (formerly Terra di Lavoro, to which it is historically and culturally attached) to the central region of Lazio.

After the king dismissed Mussolini in the summer of 1943, the latter was initially taken via Gaeta to the island prison of Ponza. After Italy surrendered to the Allies, however, the town's fortunes began to decline. Recognising its strategic importance and fearing an Allied landing in the area, German troops occupied the city and expelled most of the population. The exclusion zone extended five kilometres from the historical city centre. Soon after, however, the population was expelled even beyond this point. The Gaetani were finally ordered to leave the area completely. Those who could not be placed in a concentration camp and a few were taken to Germany.

Following the Allied advance across the Garigliano River and the Allied occupation of Rome, the Gaetani were allowed to return to their city and begin the process of rebuilding. In subsequent decades the city has boomed as a beach resort, and it has seen some success marketing its agricultural products, primarily its tomatoes and olives. Many of its families count seamen among their number. However, the decades since World War II have been as difficult for Gaeta as they have been for most of Italy's Mezzogiorno. In particular, its importance as a passenger seaport has nearly vanished: ferries to Ponza and elsewhere now leave from the nearby town of Formia. All attempts to build a permanent industry as a source of employment and economic well-being for the town have failed. Notable losses include the Littorina rail line (now used as a parking lot and a marketplace), the AGIP refinery (nowadays a simple depot), and the once-thriving glass factory, which has become an unused industrial relic.

Gaeta does have a viable tourism industry as it is a popular seaside resort. Its warm, rain-free summers attract people to its numerous beaches along the coastline, such as Serapo and Sant'Agostino's beaches. Nearly equidistant to Naples and Rome, Gaeta is a popular summer tourist destination for people from both cities' metropolitan areas.

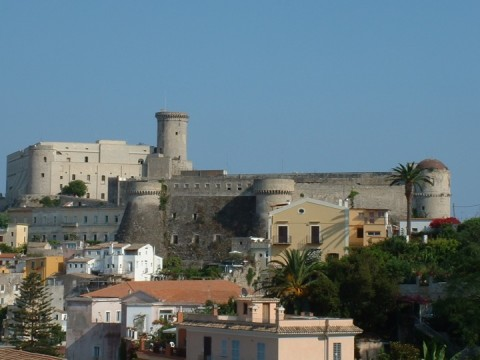
Angevine-Aragonese Castle

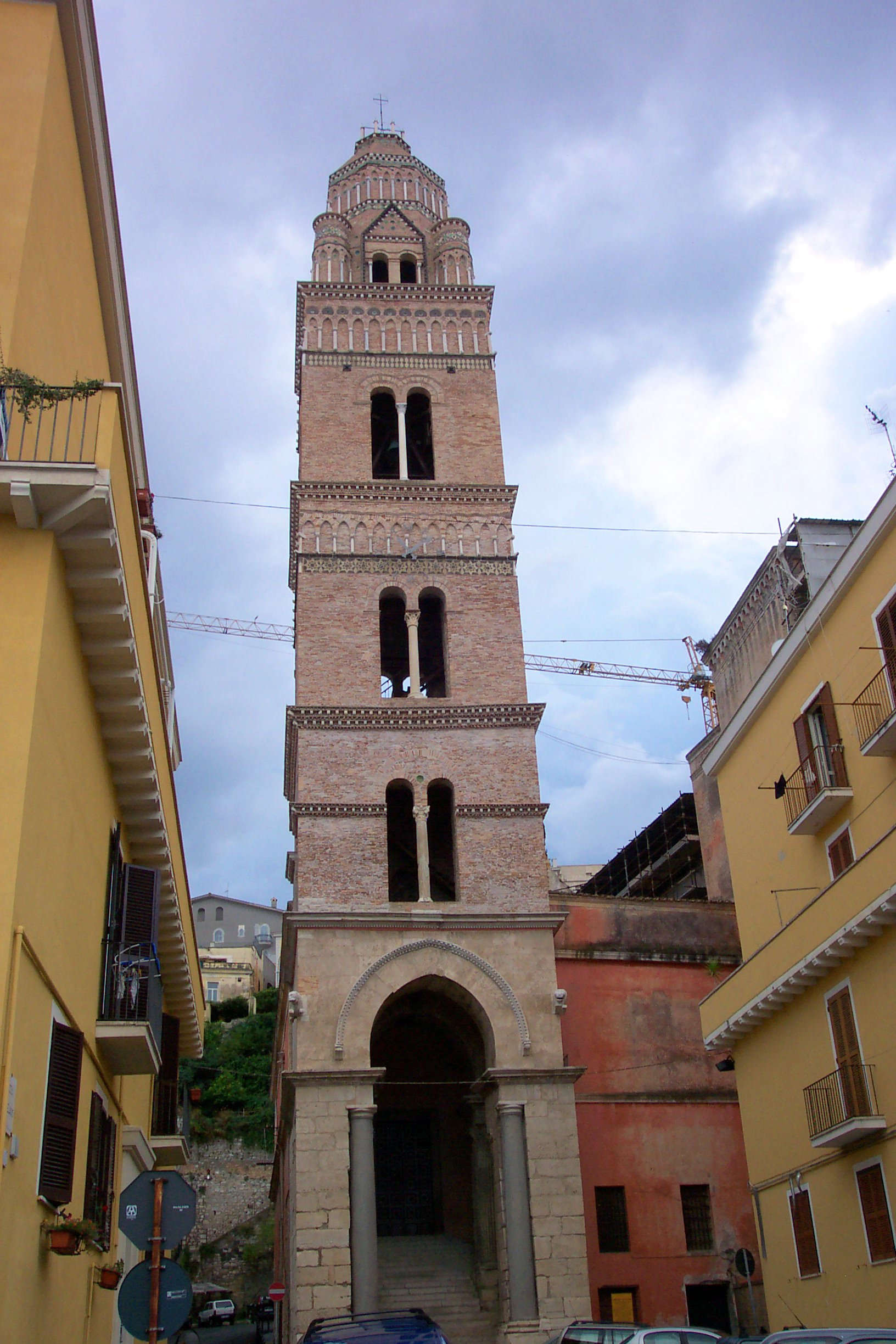
The bell tower of the Cathedral

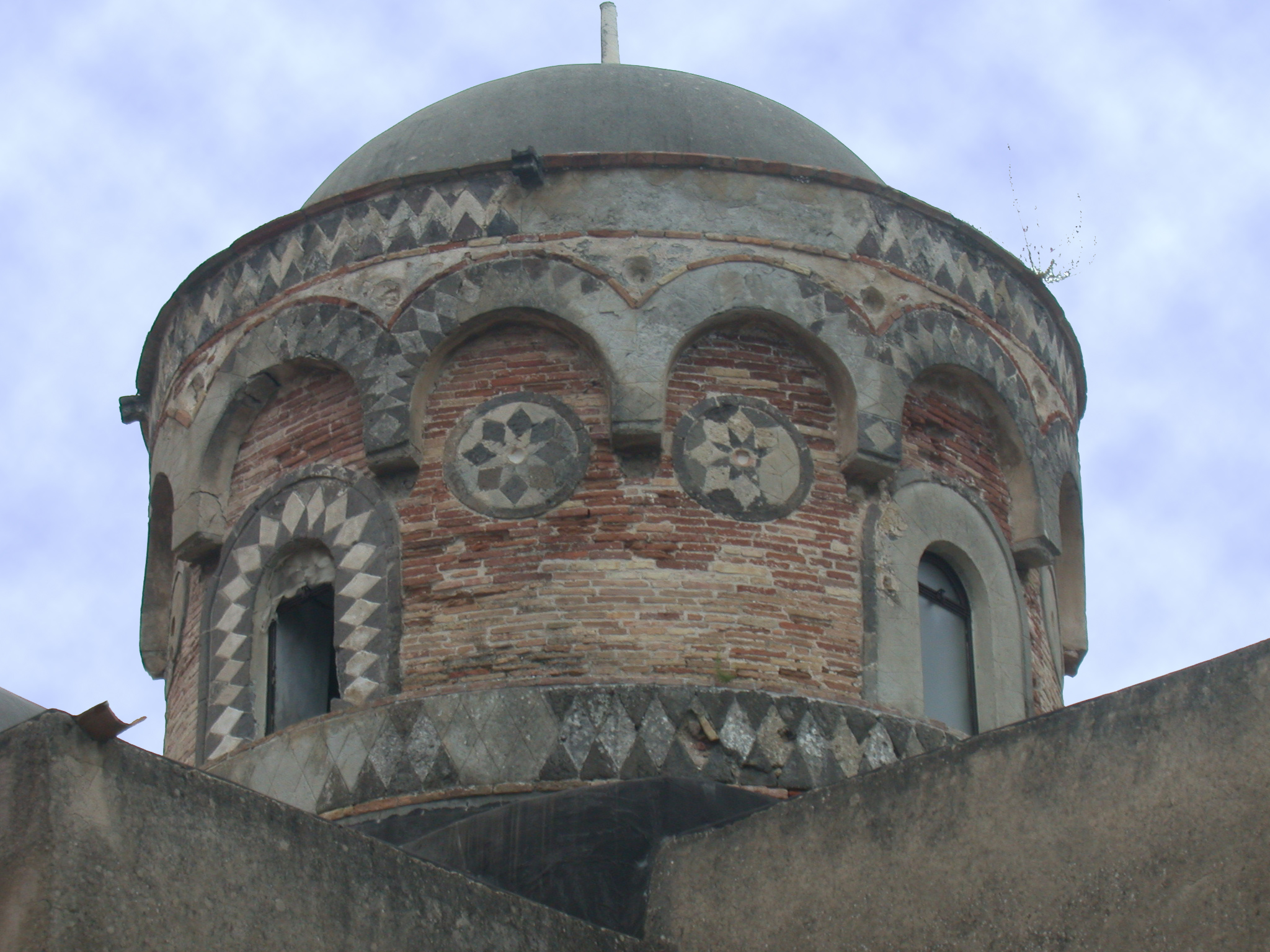
Dome of San Giovanni a Mare church

== Main sights ==
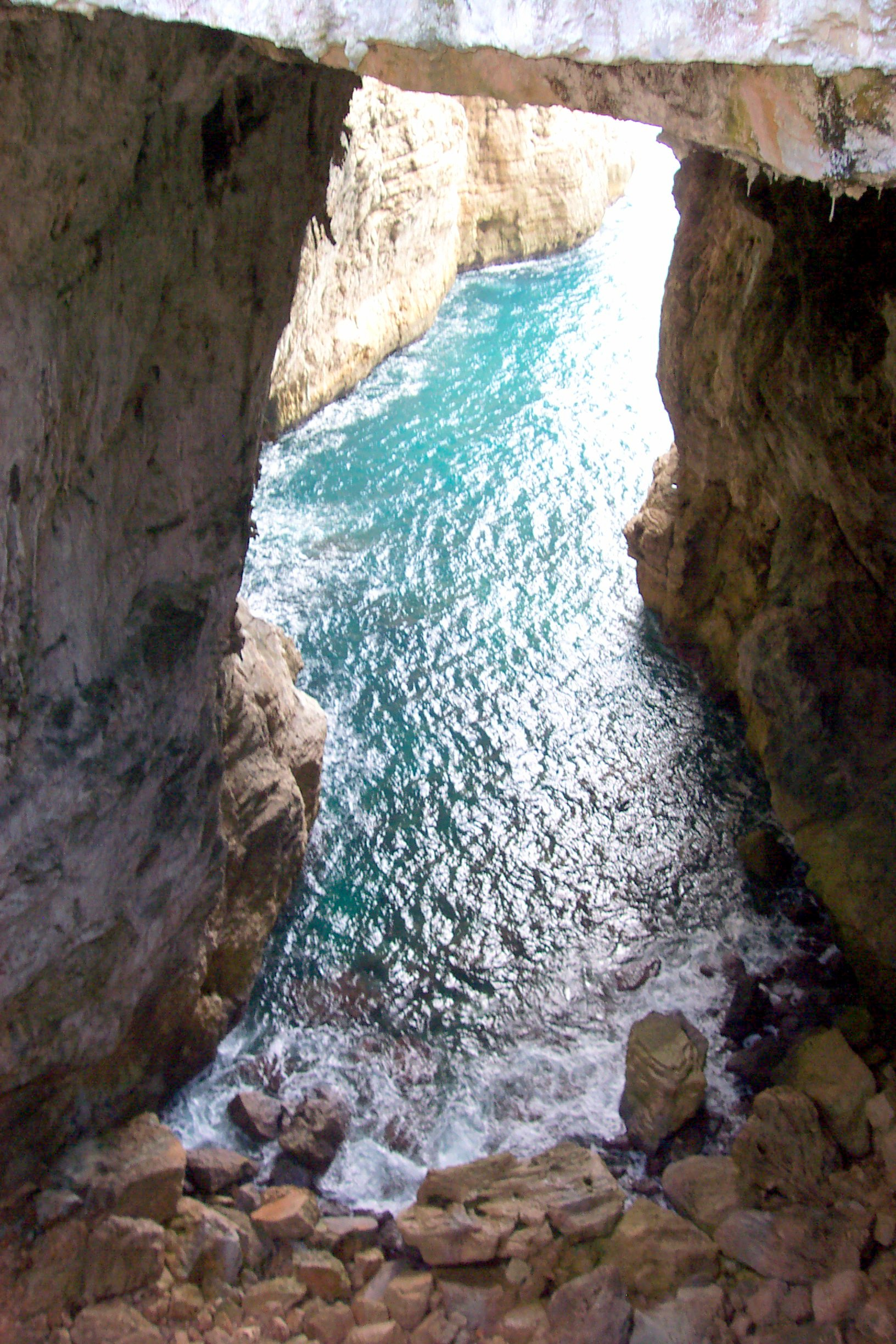
The natural sea grotto of La Grotta Del Turco (the Turk's grotto)

The main attractions of the city include:

- The Angevine-Aragonese Castle. Its origins are uncertain: most likely it was built in the 6th century, in the course of the Gothic War, or during the 7th century to defend the town from the Lombards' advance. The first documents mentioning it date to the age of Frederick II of Hohenstaufen, who strengthened it in 1233. The current structure is made of two different edifices: the "Angevine" one, in the lower sector, dating to the House of Anjou's rule in the Kingdom of Naples; and the "Aragonese", at the top, built by emperor Charles V, together with the other fortifications that made Gaeta one of the strongest fortresses in southern Italy. The Angevine wing housed a military jail until the 1980s (German war criminal officers Walter Reder and Herbert Kappler were imprisoned here). Now it is a property of Gaeta's municipality, which uses it for conferences and exhibitions. In the dome of the tallest tower is the Royal Chapel, built by King Ferdinand II of the Two Sicilies in 1849.
- The Mausoleum of Lucius Munatius Plancus (22 BCE) is a cylindrical travertine monument at the top of Monte Orlando (168 m (551 ft)). It stands at 13.20 m (43.3 ft) and has a diameter of 29.50 m (96.8 ft). Another important Roman public man, Lucius Sempronius Atratinus, Mark Antony's fleet commander, has a mausoleum sited in the more recent district of Gaeta: of similar diameter; it is, however not as well preserved.
- The Sanctuary of SS. Trinità was mentioned as early as the 11th century and visited, among others, by St. Francis and Saint Philip Neri. The Crucifix Chapel was built in 1434 over a rock which had fallen from the nearby cliffs. From the sanctuary, the Grotta del Turco can be visited: it is a grotto which ends directly in the sea and where the waves create atmospheric effects of light.
- Sanctuary of Santissima Annunziata - A church and adjacent hospital were built at the site in the 14th century but rebuilt at the beginning of the 17th century in Baroque style by Andrea Lazzari. It houses works by Renaissance painters including Andrea Sabbatini and GF Criscuolo; as well as late-Baroque artists such as Luca Giordano, Sebastiano Conca and Giacinto Brandi. The church has a Gothic-style sarcophagus of Enrico Caracciolo. Also notable is the Golden Chapel or Grotto, a Renaissance-style chapel where Pope Pius IX meditated before issuing the dogma of the Immaculate Conception. The ceiling is gilded, and the walls contain 19 canvases (1531) by Criscuolo. The main altarpiece is an Immacolata by Scipione Pulzone.
- San Giovanni a Mare - The church was initially built outside the old sea walls by the hypate Giovanni IV in the 10th century. It combines the basilica form with the Byzantine one. The simple façade has a Gothic portal and a dome, while the interior has a nave with two aisles. The inner pavement is slightly inclined to allow waters to flow away in the case of maritime floods.
- The Cathedral of Saints Erasmus and Marcian and St. Mary of the Assumption was erected over a more ancient church, Santa Maria del Parco, and consecrated by Pope Paschal II in 1106: it had a nave with six aisles separated by columns with Gothic capitals. In 1778, however, two of the aisles were suppressed, and the Gothic lines were hidden. In the 13th century, Moorish arches were added over the capitals. In 1663 the crypt was decorated in Baroque style. The interior houses a banner from the Battle of Lepanto, donated by Pope Pius V to Don John of Austria, who used it as his admiral's flag. The main sight of the church is, however, the marble Paschal candelabrum, standing 3.50 m (11.5 ft) tall, from the late 13th century: it is in Romanesque style, decorated with 48 reliefs in 4 vertical rows, telling the Stories of the Life of Jesus. There are also paintings by Giacinto Brandi and Giovanni Filippo Criscuolo. The cathedral contains the relics of St. Erasmus, transferred from Formia; the remarkable bell tower, in Arab-Norman style, dates from the 12th century. At the base are slabs and parts of columns from ancient Roman edifices. The Cathedral has a great bell tower, standing at 57 m (187 ft), which is considered the city's finest piece of art. The base has two marble lions, and the whole construction largely reused ancient Roman architectural elements. The upper part, octagonal in plan, with small Romanesque arches with majolica decoration, was completed in 1279.
- The Chapel of the Crucifix is a curiosity: built on a huge mass of rock that hangs like a wedge between two adjoining walls of rock. Legend tells how the rock was thus split at Christ's death.
- Temple of St. Francis - According to the legend, the church was constructed by the saint himself in 1222. In reality, Frederick II ordered the construction. The church features a fine Gothic-Italian style and hosts paintings and sculptures by many of the most famous Neapolitan artists.
- The parish church of Santa Lucia, the former St. Maria in Pensulis, was once a Royal chapel and here prayed Margaret of Durazzo and King Ladislaus. It originally had Romanesque and Sicilian-Arab lines, but in 1456 it was rebuilt in Renaissance style and 1648 adapted to a Baroque one. The site has a Mediaeval pronaos with ancient fragments and figures of animals.
- The Mediaeval Ward of Gaeta is itself of interest. It lies on the steep sides of Mount Orlando and has characteristic houses from the 11th-13th centuries.

Gaeta is also the centre of the Regional Park of Riviera di Ulisse, which includes Mount Orlando, Gianola and Scauri's Mounts, and the two promontories of Torre Capovento and Tiberius' Villa in Sperlonga.

== NATO naval base ==
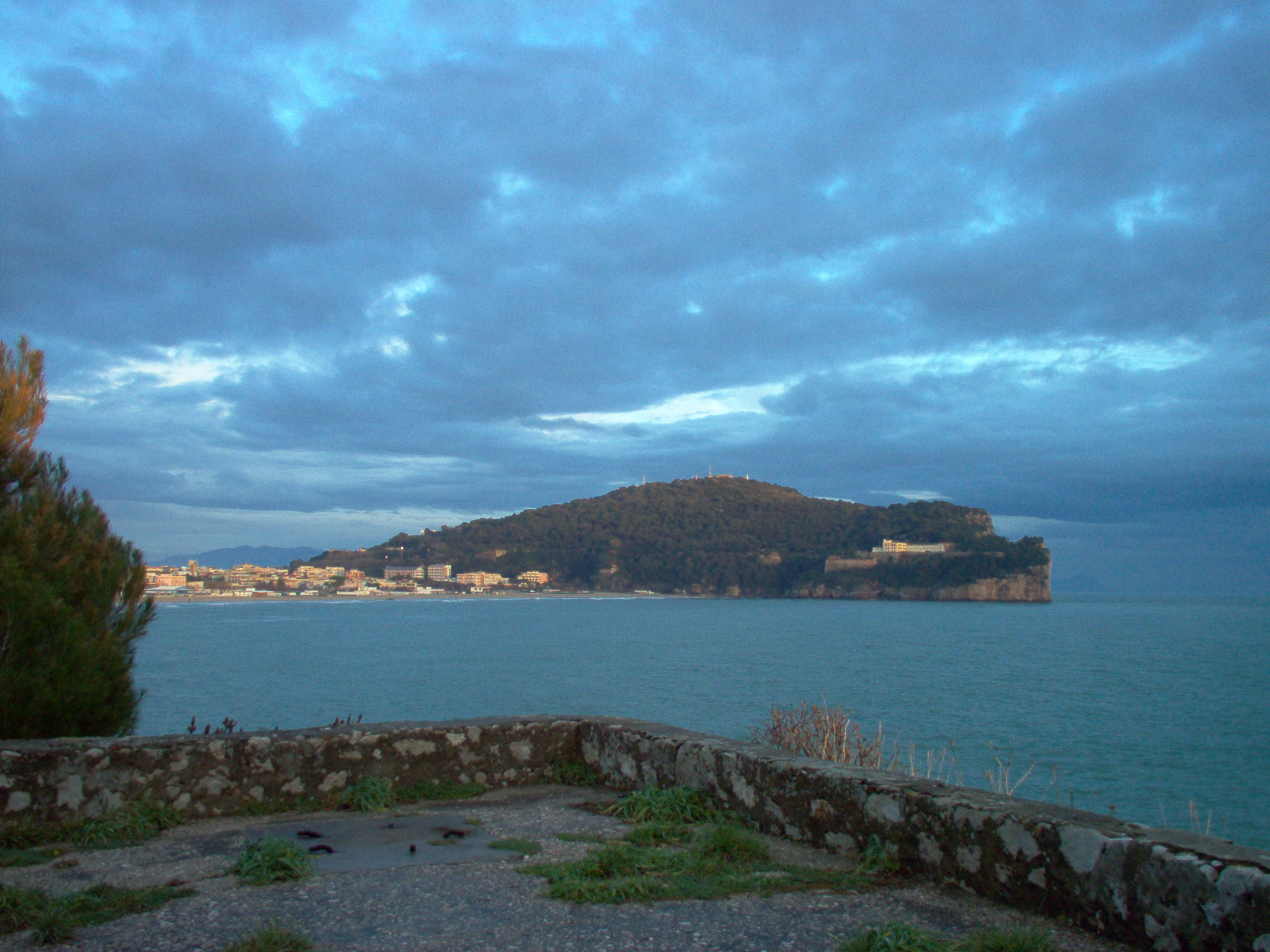
View of Monte Orlando from a former anti-aircraft position on Serapo's seaside. The Montagna Spaccata is the sharply vertical cliff on the right side of the promontory. The bastions of Charles V can be seen just in the lower left corner of the convent in the woods.

In 1967, the homeport of the U.S. Sixth Fleet flagship relocated from Villefranche-sur-Mer to Gaeta. Support facilities were established in Mount Orlando. This was done following the transfer of the responsibilities of Lead Nation for NATO Naval Forces in the Mediterranean from the United Kingdom to the United States. The British Mediterranean Fleet was abolished - its former base in Malta was no longer exclusively under British control due to that nation having achieved independence from the UK.

It is currently used as the home port for the flagship of the United States Sixth Fleet. The Sixth Fleet commander, typically a 3-Star US Navy Vice-Admiral, has operational control of Naval task forces, battle groups, amphibious forces, support ships, land-based surveillance aircraft, and submarines in the Mediterranean Sea. Gaeta's role has been important since the early 19th century to the US Navy's commitment to forward presence. Pope Pius IX and King Ferdinand II of the Kingdom of Two Sicilies, paid visits to the USS Constitution while in Gaeta in 1849. Nine ships have been stationed in Gaeta, with the primary mission of serving as the flagship for the Sixth Fleet commander. The first was the USS Little Rock (CG-4). Other Sixth Fleet flagships included USS Springfield (CLG-7), USS Albany (CG-10), USS Puget Sound (AD-38), USS Coronado (AGF-11), USS Belknap (CG-26) and USS La Salle (AGF-3). The current flagship is the USS Mount Whitney (LCC-20).

The town is host to the families of the crews who work on the ship. There was a DOD school for American children and the US Naval Support Activity, Gaeta, which provided health care and other services until it was closed down in 2005. The NATO base itself was located on Monte Orlando, which overlooks the Gulf of Gaeta. It has recently been transferred to a shore-based facility where the Commander Sixth Fleet also operates.

== Culture ==
Gaeta has erected a monument to John Cabot, who discovered Canada in 1500. Other people associated with the town include the painters Giovanni da Gaeta and Giovanni Filippo Criscuolo. For a full list, see People from Gaeta.

Gaetani speak a dialect of Italian that, while similar to the nearby Neapolitan, is one of the few Italian dialects to preserve Latin's neuter gender.

Distinctive local cuisine includes the tiella, which resembles both a pizza and a salty crostata. Tiella can be made with several stuffings. Typical stuffings include diced squids, parsley and chilli pepper, octopuses and tomatoes. Other stuffings include escaroles and baccalà (dried and salted cods), courgettes/zucchini, spinaches, rapini and sausages, olives, onions, and sardines. The town is also known for its brand of olives, marketed throughout the world (the main production, however, takes place in neighbouring Itri), and its beaches (Serapo, Fontania, Ariana, Sant'Agostino). Sciuscielle, mostaccioli, susamelli, and roccocò are also local desserts most often made during Christmas time. A Latin text found in Gaeta dating from 997 AD contains the earliest known usage of the word "pizza".

The most famous folklore event of Gaeta is Glie Sciusce of 31 December, in which bands of young Gaetani in traditional costumes head to the city's streets, playing mainly self-built instruments.

The name Gaetano means "from Gaeta".

== International relations ==
Gaeta is twinned with:

- Cambridge, United States, since 1982
- Frontignan, France
- Mobile, United States
- Somerville, United States
- Cetinje, Montenegro, since 2012
- Babolsar, Iran, since 2016

== See also ==
- Archdiocese of Gaeta
- List of Hypati and Dukes of Gaeta
- Siege of Gaeta
- Maritime republics
- Category:People from Gaeta
- Duchy of Gaeta
- List of dukes of Gaeta
- Battle of Ponza
- Gulf of Gaeta
- Rural Marian chapels of Gaeta
