= John III of Gaeta =

John III (died 1008 or 1009) was the consul and duke of Gaeta from some time between October 984 and January 986 until his death.

He was the eldest son of Marinus II, who succeeded his brother Gregory in 978 and immediately appointed John as co-duke in order to assure his inheritance, as the precedent of fraternal inheritance had been set by the sons of Docibilis II. John's reign began with his father's death. In 991, John appointed his own son co-ruler as John IV.

The territory of the duchy had been parcelled out to many brothers. John's brother Leo inherited the duchy of Fondi in 992. Another brother, Marinus, was associated as dux in Fondi in 999. Also in 992, John's brothers Gregory and Daufer appeared as counts in Castro d'Argento and Traetto. In 997, another brother, Bernard, became bishop of Gaeta. John was able to maintain peace between himself and his powerful brothers and other relatives throughout his reign.

In January 998, he sojourned in the monastery of Saint Nilus the Younger. In 999, Emperor Otto III confirmed the independence of the various appanages of Gaeta (Fondi, Traetto, etc.). Despite this great reduction to direct Gaetan power, his brothers remained faithful to John and even treated him as the first among equals. On 15 October, Otto granted him the castle of Pontecorvo in recognition of his loyalty (he seems to have become a vassal of the Holy Roman Empire) and his participation in Otto's campaigns against Naples and Capua.

John last appears in the documentary record in August 1008, and presumably died not long thereafter. He was succeeded by his son and namesake. His wife, Emilia, later held the regency for his grandson, John V.

== Sources ==
- Caravale, Mario (ed). Dizionario Biografico degli Italiani LV Ginammi – Giovanni da Crema. Rome, 2000.
- Skinner, Patricia (1995). Family Power in Southern Italy: The duchy of Gaeta and its neighbours, 850-1139. Cambridge University Press.

Preceded by Marinus II	Duke of Gaeta; 984 – 1008	Succeeded by John IV
