= Patricia Skinner =

Patricia Skinner may refer to:

- Patricia Skinner (fencer)
- Patricia Skinner (historian)
