= Leo I of Gaeta =

Leo I, sometimes called the Usurper, was the regent of the Duchy of Gaeta from 1017 until 1024. He was a younger son of Duke John III and Duchess Emilia. After the death of his brother, John IV in 1008, his mother took over the regency for her grandson, Leo's nephew, John V. Leo challenged his mother for the regency, successfully displacing her by 1017.

As regent, Leo gave away public land to Kampulus, son of Docibilis, of the prominent Kampuli family, probably in an effort to gain the family's support. The fisheries owned by the duke on the island of Ventotene and Santo Stefano in the Pontines were granted to Kampulus.

There is a single document from 1023 in which Leo and Emilia are listed together as regents, but it comes from the autonomous county of Suio and may not represent the facts on the ground. Leo does not appear as regent of Gaeta after 1024, and it is possible that he died around that time. His mother resumed the office in 1025. The conflict between Leo and Emilia was devastating for Gaeta's influence in the region. The counts of Traetto ceased to recognise Gaetan sovereignty around this time, as did the area of Sperlonga.

== Sources ==
- Skinner, Patricia (1995). Family Power in Southern Italy: The Duchy of Gaeta and Its Neighbours, 850–1139. Cambridge University Press.

Preceded by Emilia (as regent)	Duke of Gaeta; Regent for John V (1017–1024)	Succeeded by Emilia (as regent)
