= Codex diplomaticus Caietanus =

The Codex diplomaticus Caietanus (CDC) is an edited collection of documents (diplomas) pertaining to the Southern Italian city of Gaeta in the Middle Ages, from the eighth century to the fourteenth. The collection represents "for its geographically restricted range ... a relative abundance of sources". The Codex consists of documents kept in the archives of the Abbey of Montecassino, including the archives of the Gattola family, which were given to the abbey. The Codex was originally conceived in the late eighteenth century and finally published, as part of the Tabularium casinense series, by the monks of Montecassino in three volumes beginning with the first in 1887, the second volume in 1891 and the third volume in two installments in 1958 and 1960. Although the assembling of all the documents relating to medieval Gaeta was sometimes undertaken uncritically, the monks appended a comprehensive and trustworthy index.

The Codex is the main source for the history of the Duchy of Gaeta and it provides greater detail for it than for the neighbouring early medieval states of Amalfi, Naples and Sorrento.

It is also notable for containing the first recorded reference to pizza in a notarial record written around 997 demanding a payment of food including pizzas.

== Sources ==
- Guiraud, Jean-François. "Le réseau de peuplement dans le duché de Gaète du X^{e} au XIII^{e} siècle" Mélanges de l'École française de Rome. Môyen-Âge, Temps modernes, 94, 2 (1982): 485–511. Accessed on 10 May 2013.
- Skinner, Patricia. Family Power in Southern Italy: The Duchy of Gaeta and its Neighbours, 850–1139. Cambridge: Cambridge University Press, 1995.
