= Marinus II of Fondi =

Marinus II was a 10th-century noble who was the second dux of Fondi after his father, Marinus I. He is an ancestor of the Caetani.
