= Constantine of Gaeta =

Constantine was the first known Hypatus of Gaeta from 839 or thereabouts until he disappears from records abruptly in 866. From the abruptness of his disappearance, he is often supposed to have been deposed violently by his successor Docibilis I.

He was a son of Anatolius of the Anatoli family. He associated his son Marinus I with him as comes. He was undoubtedly a Byzantine agent, originally holding the castle of Gaeta from his sister Elisabeth's son-in-law Theodosius, the prefect of Naples.

== Sources ==
- Skinner, Patricia. Family Power in Southern Italy: The Duchy of Gaeta and its Neighbours, 850-1139. Cambridge University Press: 1995.
- Caravale, Mario (ed). Dizionario Biografico degli Italiani XL Di Fausto – Donadoni. Rome, 1991.

New title	Hypatus of Gaeta; 839 – 866 with Marinus I	Succeeded by Docibilis I
