= John IV of Gaeta =

John IV (died April or August 1012) was the eldest son of John III of Gaeta and Emilia. He was appointed co-duke in 991 while still young (he was a minor even in 994). John succeeded his father in 1008 or 1009 and ruled for a brief four years.

John married Sichelgaita, daughter of John IV of Naples and sister of Sergius IV. He left an infant son, John V, under the regency of his mother, Emilia. His brother Leo fought for the regency and his cousin Leo tried to usurp the throne from the young John V.

== Sources ==
- Caravale, Mario (ed). Dizionario Biografico degli Italiani LV Ginammi – Giovanni da Crema. Rome, 2000.
- Skinner, Patricia (1995). Family Power in Southern Italy: The duchy of Gaeta and its neighbours, 850-1139. Cambridge University Press.

| Preceded by John III | Duke of Gaeta; 1008–1012 | Succeeded by John V |
