= Emilia of Gaeta =

Emilia (died January 1036) was the duchess of Gaeta first as consort of John III (984–1008) and then as the regent for her grandson John V (1012–1032) until at least 1029.

At the time of her marriage, she bore the Roman title senatrix. She was probably, therefore, of Roman descent, a member of the powerful Crescenzi or Tusculani. Her marriage was most likely an alliance between the ruling Gaetan house and the Roman aristocracy to secure Gaetan favour in the eternal city, the home of both pope and emperor. The wedding took place before January 998, when Emilia appeared with John at the monastery of Saint Nilus the Younger. John died before or in 1008 and she took up a short regency for her son, John IV.

When John IV died between April and August 1012, she took over the regency of her grandson, who was an infant. Immediately, she and John were opposed by Leo I, cousin of John IV. By October, her supporters had expelled him. But then she had to deal with the opposition of her own son, Leo II, who expected to be accorded the regency. The two disputed the regency and co-undersigned charters until January 1025, when Leo last appears in the Codex Caietanus. Emilia was the sole regent in a February charter.

The Roman Emilia's politics leaned strongly towards support of the pope and the Lombards against the Byzantine Empire. In 1012, she allowed Dattus, a Lombard rebel, to garrison a tower on the Garigliano, in Gaetan territory, with papal troops, supplied by Benedict VIII. In 1014, at the Castro Argento, also on Gaetan soil, Emilia and the Bishop Bernard, her brother-in-law, hosted several local leaders: Daufer of Traetto, Pandulf II of Capua, Sergius IV of Naples, Atenulf of Montecassino, and the archbishop of Capua. The convention agreed to an anti-Byzantine policy.

In 1027, when Duke Sergius IV was forced to flee Naples, Emilia gave him refuge, for John V was his nephew. During his stay, Sergius negotiated with Emilia for Gaetan support in retaking his duchy while he conceded to the Gaetans certain rights in travelling in Neapolitan land. An accord was signed between the rulers in February 1029.

It is unknown when her regency ended. She died early in 1036, when her son Leo donated a house to the monastery of S. Giovanni di Felline in her memory.

== Sources ==
- Chalandon, Ferdinand. Histoire de la domination normande en Italie et en Sicilie. Paris, 1907.
- Caravale, Mario (ed). Dizionario Biografico degli Italiani LXII Dugoni – Enza. Rome, 1993.
