= Docibilis I of Gaeta =

Hypatus of Gaeta

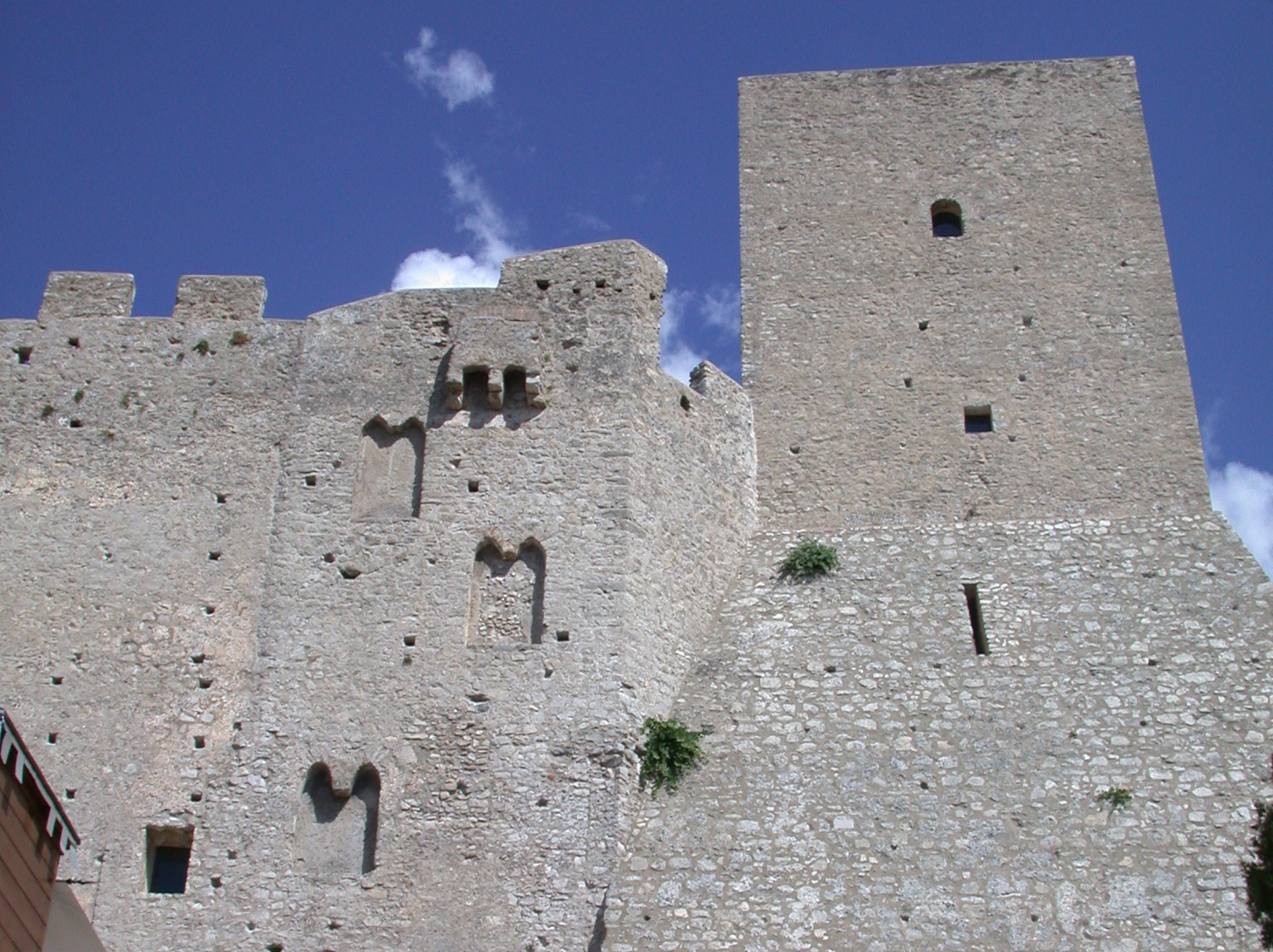
The square tower of the Castle of Itri, attributed to Docibilis I.

Docibilis I (Italian: Docibile; died before 914) was the hypatus of Gaeta from 867 until his death.

The sudden disappearance of the co-hypati Constantine and Marinus I after 866 suggests that Docibilis' assumption of power was violent. He is first cited as a prefecturius and then as hypatus from 877, when he followed his predecessor's example and associated his son John with him.

In his first years in office, he was faced with raids by the Aghlabids and he fell into their hands. After being liberated by Amalfi, he made peace with the Aghlabids and was excommunicated by Pope John VIII. In 876, the pope was down in the Mezzogiorno recruiting the princes of Capua and Salerno for the war with the Aghlabid Emirate of Sicily. Docibilis met the pope at Traetto, but could not come to terms. The pope then interfered in the Capuan succession on the death (879) of Landulf II to impose Pandenulf over Lando in return for Pandenulf attacking Docibilis. Formia was captured and Docibilis called up some Saracen mercenaries from Agropoli. He met the pope at Gaeta itself and made peace. Together they besieged the Saracen fortress on the Garigliano.

After the pope's death, he turned around and attacked Capua, according to Erchempert, with Aghlabid mercenaries in 900 and 903. He then began to turn and form alliances with the Lombard rulers, marrying his daughter Megalu to Rodgipert of Aquino and Euphemia to the prefect of Naples. Docibilis appears for the last time in 906 and may have died then, though it is only certain that he was dead by 914. His long career was the golden age of Gaeta in the Dark Ages. He began construction on the great palace whose ruins still stand in the city and he spent profusely on churches and ecclesiastic endowments for the sake of his soul. He was a warrior-prince as well, whose quarrels with all his neighbours, Muslim and Christian, Lombard and Byzantine Greek, ecclesiastic and secular, fill the chronicles of the age, especially Erchempert's. For this, it is likely that after 906, he was either dead or retired.

By his wife Matrona, he had two other sons besides John, Leo and Anatolio, whom he made duke of Terracina. He had two other daughters besides Megalu and Euphemia: Bona and Maria. John succeeded him and immediately associated his son and his father's namesake, Docibilis II, in the duchy. It is just possible that all three were associated together, but it cannot be proven.

== Sources ==
- Caravale, Mario (ed). Dizionario Biografico degli Italiani XL Di Fausto – Donadoni. Rome, 1991.

Preceded by Constantine	Hypatus of Gaeta; 866 – 906	Succeeded by John I
