= Pierre Toubert =

French historian (1932–2025)

- Born: 29 November 1932; Algiers, French Algeria
- Died: 5 June 2025 (aged 92)
- Education: École normale supérieure
- Occupation: Historian
- Employer: Collège de France

Pierre Toubert (29 November 1932 – 5 June 2025) was a French historian. He was a professor of medieval history at the University of Paris and the Collège de France. Focusing on medieval history, his most monumental work is Les structures du Latium médiéval : Le Latium méridional et la Sabine du IXe siècle à la fin du XIIe siècle (1973), in which he outlines an influential, in-depth study of incastellamento (in English, encastellation) in the Lazio region of Italy.

== Life and career ==
Pierre Toubert was born on 29 November 1932. He earned the agrégation in history and graduated from the École normale supérieure in 1958. He earned a PhD in 1972.

Toubert was an associate professor of history at the University of Paris in 1972–1973, and he became a full professor in 1973. He was also a professor of history at the Collège de France.

Toubert was inducted into the Académie des Inscriptions et Belles-Lettres 1986. He won the Silver Medal from the Centre national de la recherche scientifique in 1973, and the Prix Augustin Thierry from the Académie française in 1995. He became an officer of the National Order of Merit in 1999, and a commander in 2010.

Toubert died on 5 June 2025, at the age of 92.

== Works ==
- Toubert, Pierre (1973). Les structures du Latium médiéval : Le Latium méridional et la Sabine du IXe siècle à la fin du XIIe siecle. Rome: École Française de Rome. OCLC 483641091.
- Toubert, Pierre (1976). Études sur l'Italie médiévale. London: Variorum Collected Studies. ISBN 9780902089914. OCLC 615075416.
- Toubert, Pierre (1987). Histoire du haut Moyen Âge et de l'Italie médiévale. London: Variorum Collected Studies. ISBN 9780860782001. OCLC 928206623.
- Toubert, Pierre (1993). Leçon inaugurale faite le vendredi 9 mars 1993, Collège de France, Chaire d'histoire de l'occident méditerranéen au moyen âge. Paris: Collège de France. ISBN 9782722600096. OCLC 489616673.
- Barceló, Miquel; Toubert, Pierre (1998). L'incastellamento : actas de las reuniones de Girona (26-27 noviembre 1992) y de Roma (5-7 mayo 1994). Rome: Ecole française de Rome. ISBN 9788400077099. OCLC 496053026.
- Toubert, Pierre (2004). L'Europe dans sa première croissance : De Charlemagne à l'an mil. Paris: Fayard. ISBN 9782702895115.
