= Siege of Gaeta (1707) =

Siege during the War of the Spanish Succession

Coordinates: 41.2167°N 13.5667°E

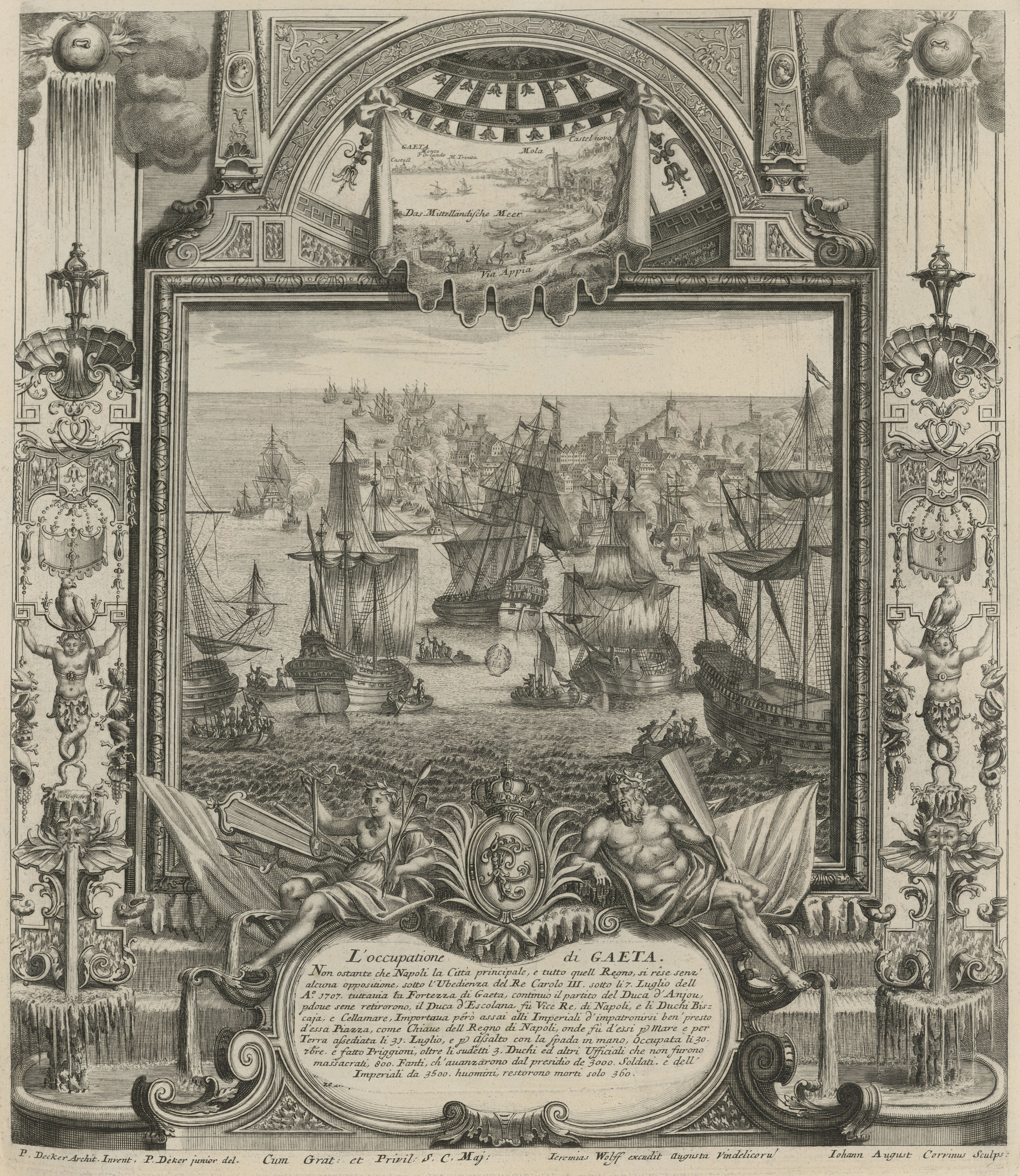
Siege of Gaeta in 1707 (engraving by J. A. Corvinus, c. 1720)

The siege of Gaeta was a three-month siege of the Italian city of Gaeta in 1707 by the forces of the Austrian monarchy under Wirich Philipp von Daun, during the War of the Spanish Succession. It ended on 30 September with the total destruction of the city's historic fortifications.
