= Gregory of Gaeta =

Gregory was the Duke of Gaeta from 963 until his death. He was the second son of Docibilis II of Gaeta and his wife Orania. He succeeded his brother John II, who had left only daughters. Gregory rapidly depleted the publicum (public land) of the Duchy of Gaeta by doling it out to family members as grants. Gregory disappears from the records in 964 and was succeeded by his younger brother Marinus of Fondi over the heads of his three sons. It is possible that there was an internal power struggle between factions of the Docibilan family and that Gregory was forced out. On the other hand, perhaps he died and his sons fought a losing battle for their inheritance to Gaeta.

His son Landolf was the progenitor of the counts of Suio.

== Sources ==
- Skinner, Patricia. Family Power in Southern Italy: The Duchy of Gaeta and its Neighbours, 850-1139. Cambridge University Press: 1995.

Preceded by John II	Duke of Gaeta; 963–978	Succeeded by Marinus II
