= Castelforte =

- Comune
- Comune di Castelforte
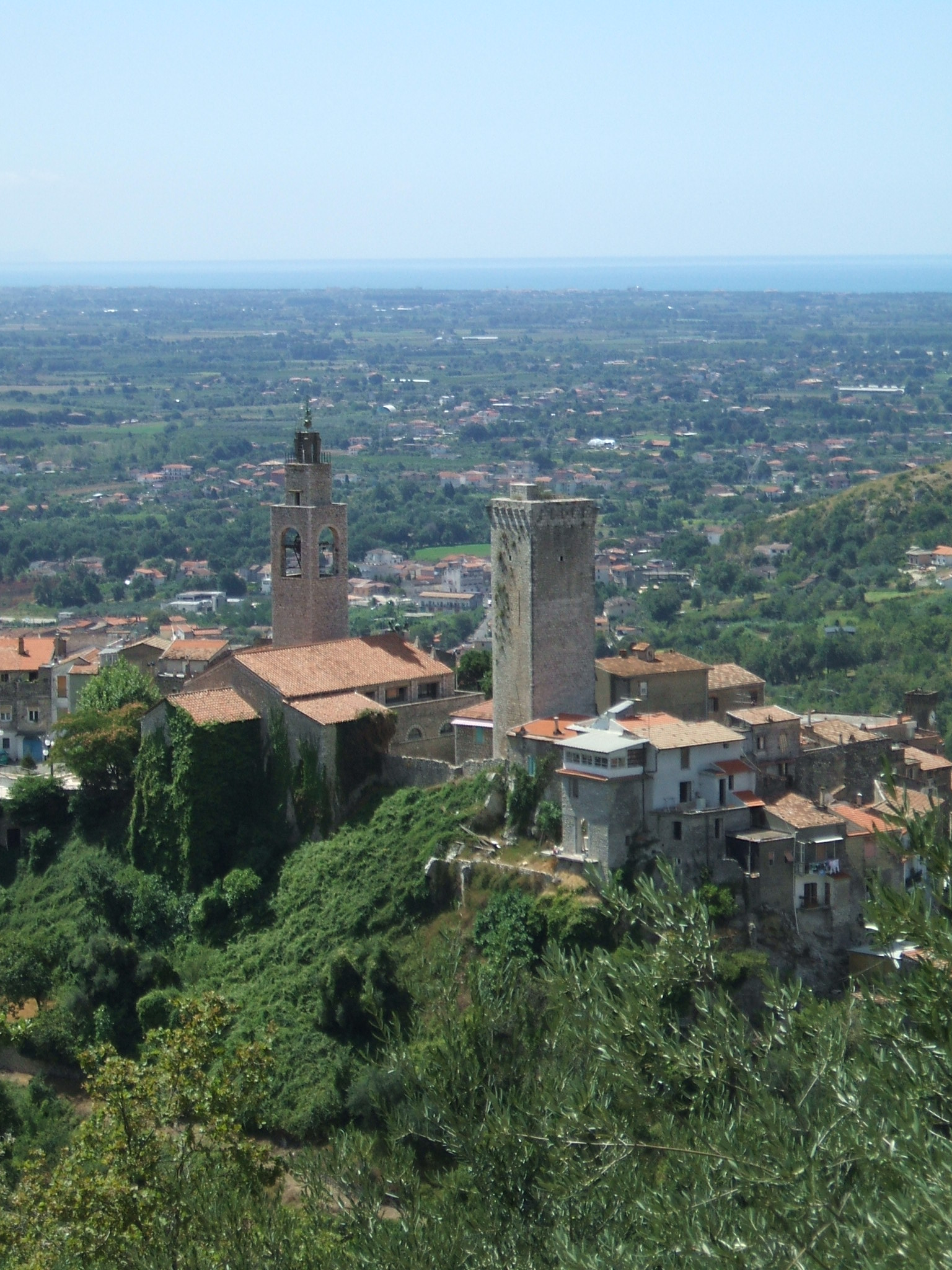
- View of Castelforte

- Coat of arms

- Location within Italy Location within Lazio
- Coordinates: 41°18′N 13°50′E
- Country: Italy
- Region: Lazio
- Province: Latina (LT)
- Frazioni: Suio

Government
  - Mayor: Angelo Felice Pompeo (Civic list)

Area
  - Total: 29 km^{2} (11 sq mi)
- Elevation: 130 m (430 ft)

Population (31 December 2017)
  - Total: 4,221
  - Density: 150/km^{2} (380/sq mi)
- Demonym: Castelfortesi
- Time zone: UTC+1 (CET)
  - Summer (DST): UTC+2 (CEST)
- Postal code: 04021
- Dialing code: 0771
- Patron saint: St. John the Baptist
- Saint day: June 24
- Website: Official website

Castelforte is a town and comune in the province of Latina, in the Lazio region of central Italy. It is located at the feet of the Monti Aurunci massif.

== History ==
Castelforte was founded most likely before the year 1000 AD. According to some scholars, it occupies the ruins of the ancient Auruncan town of Vescia, destroyed by the Romans in 340 BC (the commune includes the ruins of the large Terme Vescinae baths, in what is now the frazione of Suio).

The medieval town (Castrum Forte, meaning "Strong Castle") was a typical stronghold (probably built to counter the Saracen presence at the Garigliano) with a line of wall and rounded towers; the nearby Suio was defended by a castle. Castrum Forte's population was increased in 1320 when people from Suio moved here to flee malaria.

People from Castelforte formed two companies which fought alongside Fra' Diavolo in resistance against the French Napoleonic troops in 1798–99. This caused them to besiege and storm the town in the latter year. In 1807 Suio, now nearly depopulated, was aggregated to the municipality.

During the battles of Cassino of World War II, Castelforte, part of the German Gustav Line, was heavily bombed by Allied troops (1943–44). The city suffered hundreds of casualties in the event. There is a museum to commemorate the soldiers and civilians dead during that period.

== See also ==
- Suio
