= Madenburg Castle =

Coordinates: 49.168°N 8.008°E

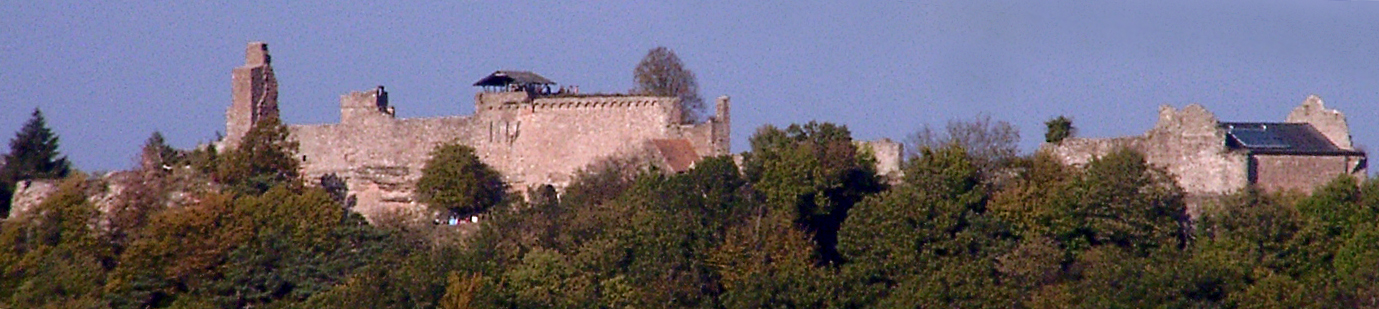
Madenburg Castle seen from the west

The ruin of Madenburg Castle is one of the biggest and oldest castle complexes in Rhineland-Palatinate, Germany. The castle was built on a cliff on the outskirts of the Palatinate Forest looking towards the Rhine rift valley. The ruin, which is surrounded by forest, lies at an elevation of 458 metres overlooking Eschbach.

Despite its strong defences, the castle was destroyed during the War of the Grand Alliance by the troops of Joseph de Montclar. The castle was never rebuilt.
