= Leo II of Gaeta =

Duke of Gaeta, a medieval Italian duchy

Leo II was the Duke of Gaeta briefly in early 1042. He was the last duke of the native Docibilan family. His father was the magnificus Docibilis, a grandson of Duke Gregory. His brother, Hugh, was the count of Suio.

Gaeta had been under the control of the Lombard Principality of Capua since 1032, and in 1040 it recognized the suzerainty of Prince Guaimar IV of Salerno. Leo probably owed his rise to a native reaction to Lombard rule, perhaps an outright revolt. In one of his official acts as duke, he granted a public mill to members of the powerful Kampuli family "in return for their services". Their services were probably instrumental in Leo's rise. Only one other act of Leo II's is known to survive. By late 1042, Guaimar had succeeded in imposing his own candidate for duke, the Norman adventurer Rainulf, on the Gaetan throne.

Leo was married to a senatrix named Theodora. The name and title strongly suggest that she was Roman, perhaps of the Crescentii family. She had a son named Peter. Leo had at least three sons: Raynerius, who succeeded his uncle as count of Suio; Docibilis; and Leo, who was elected bishop of Gaeta in 1049/50.

== Sources ==
- Bloch, Herbert (1986). Monte Cassino in the Middle Ages. Volume I (Parts I–III). Harvard University Press.
- Skinner, Patricia (1995). Family Power in Southern Italy: The Duchy of Gaeta and Its Neighbours, 850–1139. Cambridge University Press.

| Preceded by Pandulf | Duke of Gaeta; 1042 | Succeeded by Rainulf |
