= John II of Gaeta =

John II (died 963) was the duke of Gaeta, associated with his father Docibilis II and grandfather John I from 933 and sole ruler from the former's death in 954. His mother was Orania, of Neapolitan extraction. In 934, he was ruling alone with his father, his grandfather having died in the interim.

During his reign, he augmented the palace his forefather's had built and he endowed many churches. On behalf of his late wife Theodenand, he made a great donation to the Church of Ss. Teodoro e Martino. However, he weakened the principality by dividing it. He recognised his brother Marinus as duke of Fondi, as per their father's will, and gave the Church of Saint Erasmus at Formia to his brother Leo. He never had any offspring to associate with him and he was succeeded by his brother Gregory in 962 or 963.

== Sources ==
- Caravale, Mario (ed). Dizionario Biografico degli Italiani LV Ginammi – Giovanni da Crema. Rome, 2000.
- Caravale, Mario (ed). Dizionario Biografico degli Italiani XL Di Fausto – Donadoni. Rome, 1991.

Preceded by Docibilis II	Duke of Gaeta; 954–963	Succeeded by Gregory
