= Marinus I of Gaeta =

Historical figure of Gaeta

Marinus I was probably a Hypatus of Gaeta in association with his father from 839 or thereabouts until he disappears from records abruptly in 866. From the abruptness of his disappearance, he and his father are often supposed to have been deposed violently by their successor Docibilis I. Marinus witnessed his father's land grants in 839 and later records give him the title comes. It has been suggested that a prefect of the name Kampulus was his son (Skinner, 35).

== Sources ==
- Skinner, Patricia. Family Power in Southern Italy: The Duchy of Gaeta and its Neighbours, 850-1139. Cambridge University Press: 1995.
- Caravale, Mario (ed). Dizionario Biografico degli Italiani XL Di Fausto – Donadoni. Rome, 1991.
