= Marinus II of Gaeta =

Marinus II was the son of Docibilis II of Gaeta and Orania of Naples. He was made dux of Fondi by his father and his elder brother John II recognised this title. After his brother Gregory, who succeeded John, died, Marinus succeeded to the duchy of Gaeta and gave Fondi to his son Marinus. He was succeeded by his son John III and is the father of the Caetani family.

Marinus is cited as Marinus consule dux Gaiete in a charter of 12 November 999 in which the Emperor Otto II ruled against him in a case with the Abbey of Montecassino.

== Sources ==
- Skinner, Patricia (1995). Family Power in Southern Italy: The duchy of Gaeta and its neighbours, 850-1139. Cambridge University Press.

Preceded by Gregory	Duke of Gaeta; 978–984	Succeeded by John III
