= Suio =

- Frazione
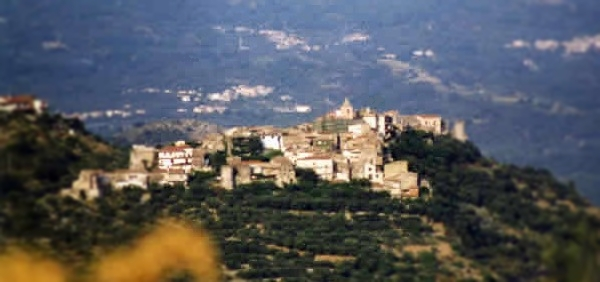
- A view of Suio Alto ("Upper Suio")

- Location of Suio in Italy
- Coordinates: 41°17′49″N 13°51′08″E
- Country: Italy
- Region: Lazio
- Province: Latina (LT)
- Comune: Castelforte
- Demonym: Suiani
- Time zone: UTC+1 (CET)
  - Summer (DST): UTC+2 (CEST)
- Postal code: 04020
- Dialing code: 0771

Suio is a frazione (rural borough) of Castelforte, a municipality in southern Latium, central Italy.

== Overview ==
It is located on the northernmost slopes of the Monti Aurunci, near the Garigliano river, and is composed of two villages: Suio Paese (or Suio Alto), situated on a hill with a medieval castle, and Forma di Suio, at the feet of the castle, in a location where thermal baths exists. The latter were mentioned since ancient times by writers such as Pliny the Elder and Lucan (Suio was a center of the Aurunci before the Roman conquest), and were frequented until the late Roman imperial times. Bath tourism became again active after World War II. Part of the Battle of the Garigliano (1503) was fought nearby.

Other sights include the 13th century church of Santa Maria in Pensulis, which was perhaps built over a Roman villa, and was originally owned by the Knights Hospitaller of Gaeta, and the 15th century church of San Michele Arcangelo, at Suio Alto.

== Thermal Baths ==
The thermal baths are situated along the Garigliano River and are a result of volcanic activity causing natural bubbling springs to occur. During the summer and spring months the hot springs are a common local spot. The baths' water is high in sulfur and mineral deposits from the volcanic activity. These water qualities are thought to have beneficial effects on the skin by the local population, one of the reasons for its popularity.

== Sources ==
- Nicosia, Angelo (1995). Il Lazio meridionale tra antichità e medioevo. Caramanica.
