= John V of Gaeta =

John V (c. 1010 – c. 1040) was the consul and duke of Gaeta from 1012 to 1032. He was the son of John IV and Sichelgaita, sister of Sergius IV of Naples. He was either very young (an infant) when he succeeded his father or perhaps he was even born posthumously.

His regency was disputed by Leo, his father's brother, and the senatrix Emilia, his father's mother. From 1014 to 1024, Leo acted as co-duke, but then he retired to Itri and left the regency to Emilia (1025). In 1027, John gave refuge to Sergius IV, who had been forced out of Naples. The two of them together plotted his retaking of Naples and recruited Ranulf Drengot, a Norman mercenary, to their cause.

Later, when Ranulf had realigned himself with Pandulf IV of Capua, Sergius and John's old enemy and the old captor of Naples, John was threatened by the new Lombard-Norman alliance. In 1032, Pandulf conquered Gaeta and John went into hiding, where he continued to harass Pandulf and tried to control his territories without his capital. He died around 1040.

== Sources ==
- Chalandon, Ferdinand. Histoire de la domination normande en Italie et en Sicilie. Paris, 1907.
- Norwich, John Julius. The Normans in the South 1016-1130. Longmans: London, 1967.

Preceded by John IV	Duke of Gaeta; 1012 – 1032	Succeeded by Pandulf I
