= Docibilis II of Gaeta =

Docibilis II (Italian: Docibile; c. 880 – c. 954) was the ruler of Gaeta, in one capacity or another, from 906 until his death. He was the son of the hypatus John I, who made him co-ruler in 906 or thereabouts.

Docibilis took part in the Battle of Garigliano in 915. In 930, he began adding the title of duke (dux), to his title of hypatus. This was meant to signify a new status or rank, though the Byzantine Empire, to which he was always legally a vassal, always recognised him merely as archon (ἄρχων). His father died in 933 or 934, and he subsequently became sole ruler. At that juncture, he began asserting his independence from the Byzantines. He abandoned the imperial dating by which charters were dated by the year of the emperor's reign and allied with Theobald I of Spoleto against the Greeks.

Likewise, his wife Orania took the title of duchess, ducissa, alongside hypatissa, and he associated his son, John II, with him in the dukedom. In 939 he removed the style hypatus and began calling himself consul. He married his daughter Maria to the prince of Capua, to strengthen his ties to the rest of the local Italian nobility. Atenulf Megalu, the gastald of Aquino, fled to Docibilis' protection, but none of this bettered his relations with the Lombard princes: he was attacked by Landulf I of Benevento and lost some territory. Later on, he even imprisoned the abbot of Monte Cassino and was not above allying with the Saracens against which he had once fought. He was succeeded by his son John and later Gregory, and he gave Fondi to his son Marinus, with the title of dux, effectively splitting the duchy of Gaeta in two parts. His other son Leo received the Church of San Erasmo at Formia from John II and Docibilis left many daughters besides Maria: Anna, Gemma, Drosu, and Megalu.

He died after 954 and before 957. In his last will (954) his palace in Gaeta, now in ruins, was described as having "rooms, corridors, baths, aviaries, kitchens and courtyards down to the sea."

== Sources ==
- Caravale, Mario (ed). Dizionario Biografico degli Italiani XL Di Fausto – Donadoni. Rome, 1991.

| Preceded by John I | Duke of Gaeta; 933–954 | Succeeded by John II |
