= Patricia Skinner (historian) =

British historian and academic

Patricia Skinner FRHistS
- Born: 1965 (age 60–61)
- Known for: Health and Medicine in Early Medieval Southern Italy; Living with Disfigurement in Early Medieval Europe

Academic background
- Education: University of Birmingham (PhD)

Academic work
- Discipline: History
- Sub-discipline: Social History; History of medicine
- Institutions: University of Southampton; Swansea University; University of Winchester

Patricia E. Skinner, FRHistS (born 1965) is a British historian and academic, specialising in Medieval Europe. She was until August 2020 Professor of History at Swansea University. She was previously Reader in Medieval History at the University of Winchester and Lecturer in Humanities at the University of Southampton. She has published extensively on the social history of southern Italy and health and medicine. With Dr Emily Cock, she started the project "Effaced from History: Facial Difference and its Impact from Antiquity to the Present Day" to study the history of facial disfigurement.

Skinner received her PhD in Medieval History from the University of Birmingham in 1990. Her thesis on the Duchy of Gaeta was published in 1995 as Family Power in Southern Italy. In 1997, she was elected a Fellow of the Royal Historical Society (FRHistS). She has been co-editor of Social History of Medicine since 2014, and a member of the council of the Royal Historical Society since 2015.

== Selected works ==
As author
P. Skinner (1995). Family Power in Southern Italy: The Duchy of Gaeta and its Neighbours, 850–1139. Cambridge: Cambridge University Press. ISBN 978-0521464796.
P. Skinner (1997). Health and Medicine in Early Medieval Southern Italy. Leiden: Brill. ISBN 978-9004103948.
P. Skinner (2013). Medieval Amalfi and Its Diaspora, 800–1250. Oxford: Oxford University Press. ISBN 978-0199646272.
P. Skinner (2017). Living with Disfigurement in Early Medieval Europe. Palgrave Macmillan. ISBN 978-1349950737.

As editor
P. Skinner, ed. (2003). Jews in Medieval Britain: Historical, Literary and Archaeological Perspectives. Rochester, N.Y.: Boydell Press. ISBN 978-0851159317.
P. Skinner, ed. (2009). Challenging the Boundaries of Medieval History: The Legacy of Timothy Reuter. Turnhout: Brepols. ISBN 978-2503523590.
