= Stogursey Priory =

Former English priory

Alien Priory of Stogursey
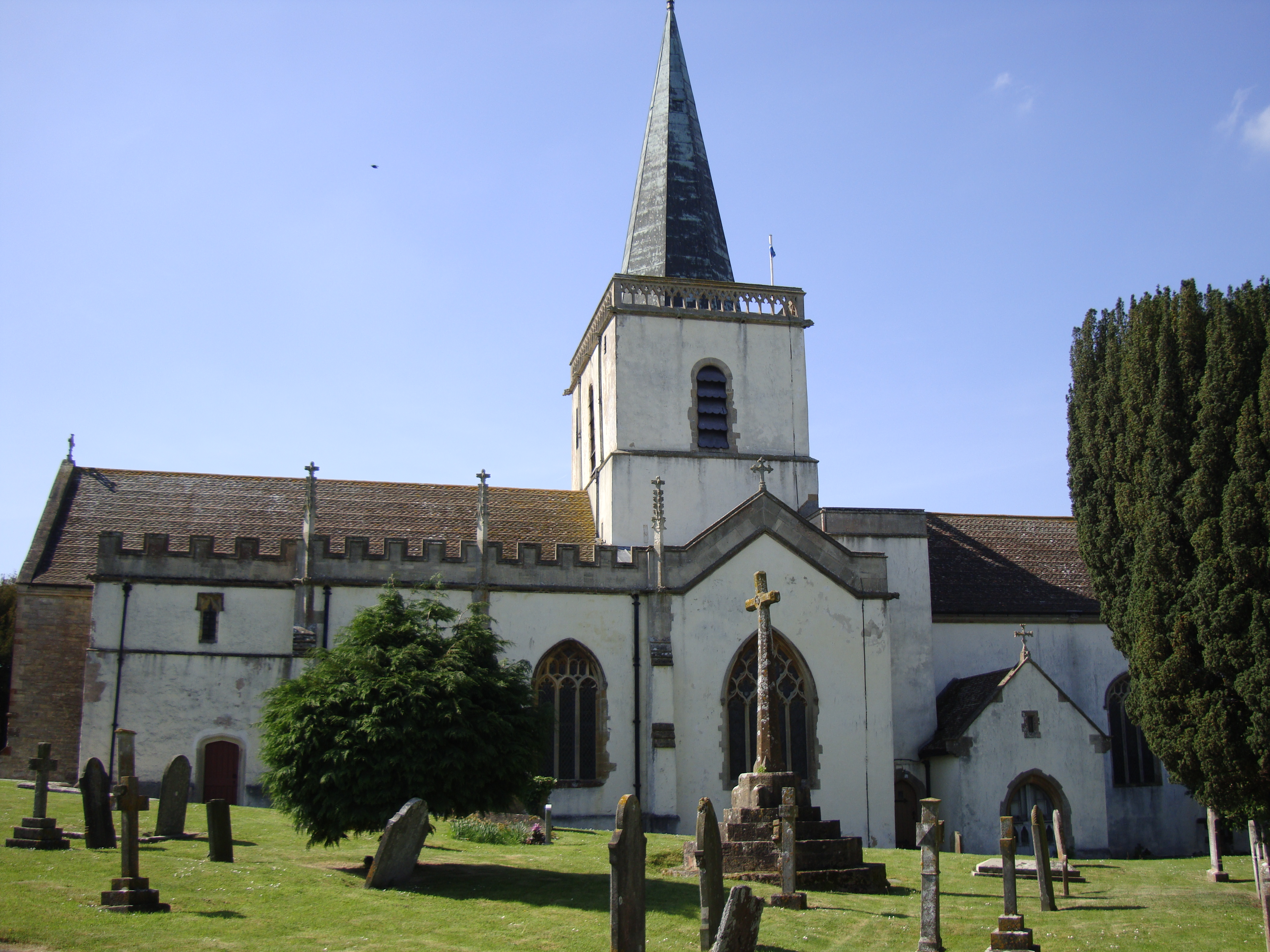

- Location within Somerset
- Interactive map of Alien Priory of Stogursey

Monastery information
- Order: Benedictine
- Established: c. 1100
- Disestablished: c. 1440
- Mother house: Lonlay-l'Abbaye, Normandy
- Dedication: St Andrew

People
- Founder: William de Falaise

Site
- Location: Stogursey, Somerset, England
- Coordinates: 51°10′50″N 3°08′30″W
- Grid reference: ST203430
- Visible remains: Church and dovecote

Stogursey Priory, also called Stoke Courcy Priory or The Priory of St Andrew de Stoke, was a Benedictine alien priory dedicated to St Andrew at Stogursey in Somerset, England. It was founded by William de Falaise, around 1100, to become a cell of Lonlay-l'Abbaye in Normandy. In around 1185 John de Courcy, its hereditary patron, founded the Priory of the Ards (Blackabbey) in County Down, Ireland, making an endowment of that estate to Stogursey Priory. The priory church survives as the parish church, and contains some of the original Norman architecture. Many of the priory's muniments are held in the archives of Eton College, which King Henry VI endowed with the appurtenances when the house was dissolved in about 1440.

== The founding families ==
Stogursey had a strategic location north-west of Bridgwater and about 4 miles west of the lower estuary of the river Parrett. In late Anglo-Saxon times the place was known as Stoke, and was owned by Beorhtsige: by 1086, following the Norman Conquest, it was owned by William de Falaise, a Norman. There is some question whether he, or rather a son of the same name, had recently married Geva, daughter of Serlo de Burci, and widow of Martin "de Wallis".

William's and Geva's daughter, Emma de Falaise, was betrothed to William de Courcy (died c. 1114), dapifer to Henry I of England from 1100, and son of Richard de Courcy. King Henry's rise to power had begun in Domfront (Orne), 4 miles from Lonlay (Orne), where the Benedictine Abbey of St Mary at Lonlay had been founded around 1020 by William 'Princeps' de Bellême, representative of the powerful House of Bellême. Richard de Courcy had two sons, William (who inherited his English lands) and Robert, who inherited his father's lands in Normandy. Robert married Rohais, one of the daughters of Hugh de Grandmesnil.

In 1090, in Normandy, Robert de Courcy and Hugh de Grandmesnil came into conflict with Robert of Bellême, 3rd Earl of Shrewsbury (great-grandson of William 'Princeps'), who sought to extend his power both in England and in Normandy. Winning the support of Robert Curthose in 1090, Robert de Bellême and the duke laid siege to de Courcy's castle at Courcy (in Calvados, Normandy). Robert and Hugh, for their part, appealed for help to King William Rufus, Duke Robert's brother, and on William's arrival in Normandy in February 1091 the siege was lifted.

== Manor, castle, church and priory ==
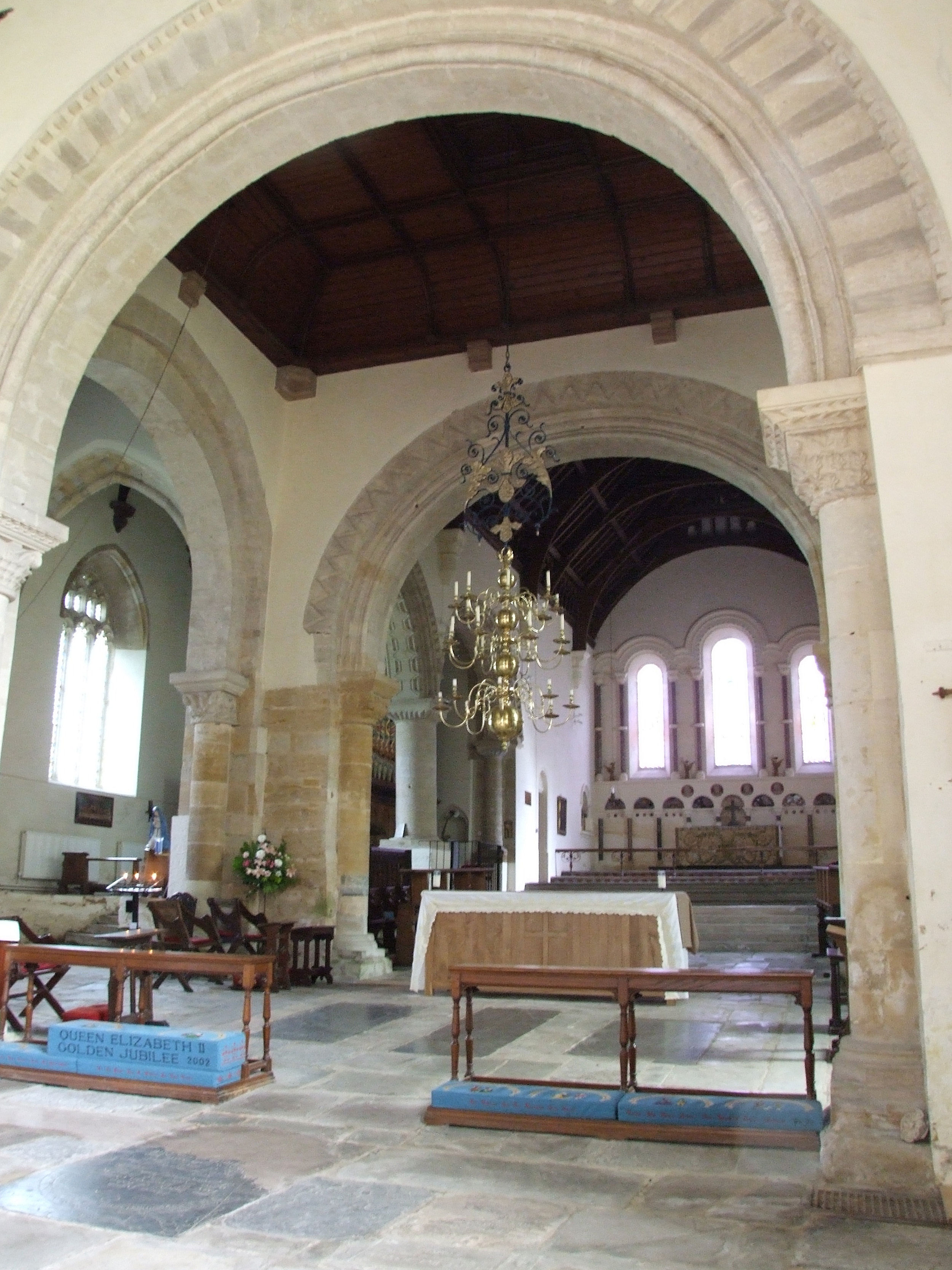
The Norman crossing at Stogursey former priory church. Photo: Robert Cutts

At their marriage, William de Courcy and Emma de Falaise received the manor of Stoke, which thus acquired the name of Stoke Courcy. Stogursey Castle, a motte and bailey castle, was built of stone a little to the south of the settlement in the late 11th or early 12th century, and was the headmanor of the de Courcy barony in this neighbourhood. The foundation of the priory at Stogursey began with the grant, datable to c. 1100-1107, of St Andrew's church by William de Falaise and Geva his wife to the church of St Mary at Lonlay. By the early 12th century Lonlay was acquiring many endowments, while William de Bellême was in confrontation with Henry I of England both in his English and his French domains. "In consequence of this grant," (wrote John Collinson), "although inconsiderable in itself, a prior and convent were sent over to settle here as a cell of that house."

The church of St Andrew, which now serves as the church of the borough of Stogursey, is at its core an edifice of distinction built around A.D. 1100. It was a cruciform structure with transepts converging at a high crossing with tower above, supported by four great columns and arches. These incorporate a series of ornately carved capitals directly comparable to examples in Normandy of the last decade of the 11th century, while also showing elements of late Anglo-Saxon style more typical of the English Romanesque. They therefore belong to, or slightly antedate, the foundation phase of c. 1100–07, made by sculptors experienced in those converging artistic idioms. There was no precise artistic connection with the sculpture workshops of Lonlay, suggesting (as may seem self-evident) that the impressive original structure was built before William de Falaise presented it to Lonlay.

Its various subsequent endowments and their strategic meaning were discussed by Greswell. The borough itself appears to have grown up some decades later.

== Foundation of Blackabbey, County Down ==
A famous descendant of William's and Emma's, John de Courcy, made himself virtual Prince of Ulster after conquering it in 1177. He captured the Counties of Antrim and Down, and held them until he was disgraced in 1204.

Around 1183–84, he granted to the Priory of St. Andrews in Stogursey "ten carucates of land and all its appurtenances in the Country of Lart or The Ardes", in County Down, Ireland. Before 1204 the Benedictine Priory of St. Andrew's in the Ards was built at a location two miles north of Ballyhalbert in the Ards Peninsula. Over the years this priory came to be known as Black Abbey, the colour of the clothes worn by the monks, so distinguishing it from the Cistercian house of Grey Abbey nearby (which stands on the northeastern shores of Strangford Lough). Blackabbey was therefore initially founded as a cell of Stogursey Priory which was itself a cell of Lonlay. Hamilton distinguished the adoption of Blackabbey directly as a cell of Lonlay to the time of de Courcy's successor, Hugh de Lacy: it was, at any rate, referred to as "a certain priory or cell named 'Prioratus S. Andreae en le Arde, in Ultonia'" when, in around 1350, the Priory of St Mary of Lonlay effectively dissolved it and assigned it with all its lands to Richard FitzRalph, Archbishop of Armagh, and his successors.

== Dwindling fortunes ==
The priory of Stogursey dwindled over the years and was repeatedly taken into the king's hands, at one time let to one of the burgesses, Johannes Bakeler (the town's MP). It was appropriated by the Crown around 1441 and Henry VI presented the endowments of Stogursey to "the College of the Blessed Mary of Eton beside Windsor" (Eton College) which he had founded in 1440.

== Remains ==
Today virtually nothing remains of the abbey, apart from the much-restored Church of St Andrew (which also serves the village), and the dovecote. The church has been designated by English Heritage as a grade I listed building. The site may overlie an earlier Saxon establishment, and is one of the largest in West Somerset. The church retains standing Norman elements (notably in the arches of the tower, chancel and transepts), while the footings of the original apsidal ends to the transepts and chancel have been excavated. The round medieval thatched dovecote was rebuilt in 1925, though the steps are still original.
