= St Andrew's Church, Stogursey =

Church in Somerset, England

Church of St Andrew
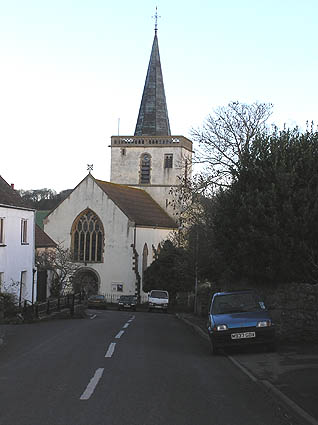

- Location within Somerset

General information
- Location: Stogursey, England
- Coordinates: 51.1795°N 3.1389°W
- Completed: 12th century

The Church of St Andrew in Stogursey, Somerset, England dates from the early 12th century and has been designated as a Grade I listed building.

The church of St Andrew, now the parish church of Stogursey, was built as part of the Benedictine priory of Stogursey founded c. 1100-07 by William de Falaise, who first appears as the manorial lord in 1086. It is thought possible that his priory occupied an earlier religious site. It was granted to become a cell of the Abbey of Lonlay Lonlay-l'Abbaye (Orne) in Normandy, near to Falaise. John de Courcy, a member of the priory's patron family seated at Stogursey Castle, who gained power in Ireland, around 1183 granted land in the Ards Peninsula in County Down to Stogursey Priory: on that land was founded, before 1204, the Priory of St. Andrews of the Ards (also called Blackabbey) which similarly became a cell of Lonlay-l'Abbaye.

The church was enlarged around 1180 when the apses were demolished and the chancel extended. The priory was dissolved around 1440, and it became a parish church. It was further altered in the 15th century, the nave was extensively restored in 1824 by Richard Carver and the chancel rebuilt between 1863 and 1865 by John Norton. The interior contains two Norman fonts.

At floor level in the south arch is a sanctuary ring installed in the 13th century. In medieval England criminals could find a place of refuge in a church for up to forty days and then admit their crime or stand trial. If they admitted their felony they would forfeit their possessions and go into exile. The sanctuary ring in the Church of St Andrew was installed 1243 after a murderer, John de Rechich, was granted sanctuary and then absconded before his trial, which meant that the priory was liable for his fine.

The tower holds six bells, the oldest of which dates from 1611.

The parish is part of the Quantock Coast benefice within the Quantock deanery.

== See also ==
- Grade I listed buildings in West Somerset
- List of ecclesiastical parishes in the Diocese of Bath and Wells
