= Priory of St. Andrews of the Ards =

Monastery in Stogursey, Somerset West and Taunton, England

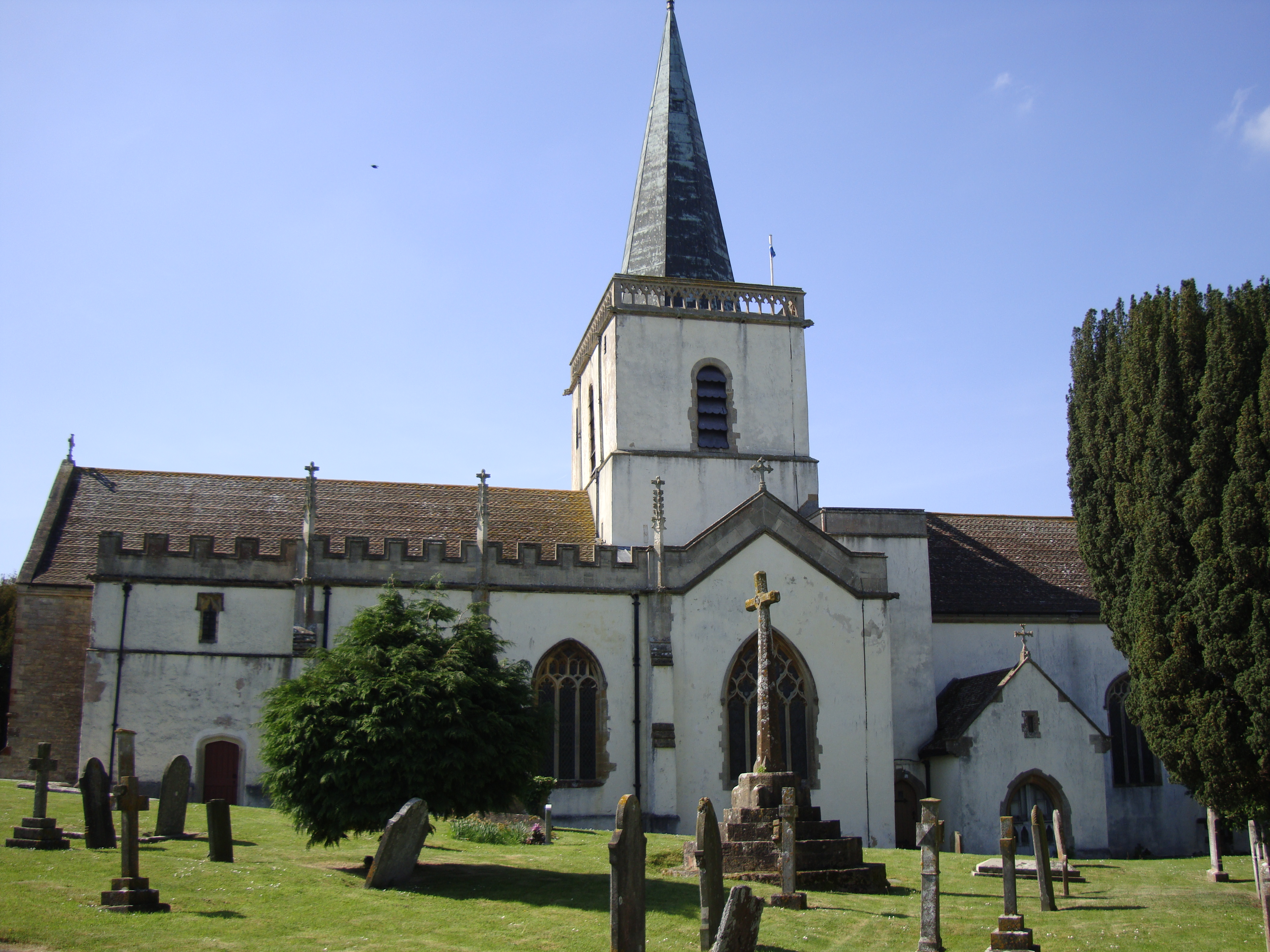
The priory as it appears today

The Priory of St. Andrews of the Ards (Blackabbey) was a Benedictine Abbey in County Down, Ireland. It was founded by John de Courcy as a daughter-house of the alien Benedictine Priory at Stogursey in Somerset, England. As Stogursey Priory was itself a cell of Lonlay-l'Abbaye in Normandy, Blackabbey also became affiliated to that house. In around 1356 the Blackabbey, with all its lands, was effectively dissolved and assigned by Lonlay to Richard FitzRalph, Archbishop of Armagh and his successors, under whom it continued.

== Stogursey Priory, England: the parent-house ==
By 1086, following the Norman Conquest, the manor of Stoke in Somerset was owned by William de Falaise. He had recently married Geva, daughter of Serlo de Burci, and widow of Martin "de Wallis". Early in the 12th century, William and Geva's daughter Emma was betrothed to William de Courcy (died c. 1114), and the couple received the manor of Stoke upon their wedding. That manor was renamed Stoke Courcy, and is now known as Stogursey. To preserve the Falaise family's association with Normandy the priory was donated as a cell to the Benedictine Abbey of St Mary at Lonlay-l'Abbaye in France. The church of Stogursey Priory was built around 1100 and incorporated a fine series of carved capitals showing affinity with Norman work of that date.

== John de Courcy: the foundation ==
The descendants of Emma and William were known as de Gursey, de Curci, or de Courcy. A distinguished member of the family was John de Courcy, who made himself virtual Prince of Ulster after conquering it in 1177. He captured the Counties of Antrim and Down. Around 1183–84, he granted to the Priory of St. Andrews in Stogursey "ten carucates of land and all its appurtances in the Country of Lart or The Ardes". By 1204 the Benedictine Priory of St. Andrew of the Ards was built about 2 miles north of Ballyhalbert in the Ards Peninsula. It became known as Blackabbey from the colour of the clothes worn by the monks, and to distinguish it from the Cistercian house of Grey Abbey nearby, on the shores of Strangford Lough.

== Richard FitzRalph ==
In 1356 Richard FitzRalph, Archbishop of Armagh, made an agreement with Lonlay to purchase the lands, tithes and privileges, for which a deed of assignment was drawn up. FitzRalph entered into a bond to pay £200 by 1360, provided that the transfer should be confirmed by the Pope, the King and the founder patrons, or else the premises to be returned to Lonlay's possession. FitzRalph died in November 1360, and the priory was seized into the King's hand. In 1388 John Colton, Archbishop of Armagh, petitioned King Richard II to the effect that Edward III had granted licence for Richard FitzRalph to acquire cells of alien religious houses in Ireland, and sought the restoration of St Andrew en le Ards: Richard White (prior of the hospital of St John of Jerusalem), Richard Russell and William Merser were appointed to look into the matter. In 1395 the king granted custody of the priory to Colton, subject to an annual payment of £10.

== See also ==
- 'Black Abbey, County Down', in Placenamesni.org
- William de Falaise
