= DeCourcy =

DeCourcy, DeCourcey, De Courcy, or De Courcey is a surname. Notable people with the surname include:

== DeCourcy/De Courcy ==
- Affreca de Courcy (late 12th-/early 13th century), noblewoman from the Kingdom of the Isles
- Alfred De Courcy (1866–1931), Birmingham whistle maker
- Anya De Courcy (born 1997), Trinidadian footballer
- Bob DeCourcy (1927–2012), Canadian professional ice hockey goaltender
- Brigie de Courcy (fl. 2000s–2010s), Irish television producer
- Charles DeCourcy (1857–1924), justice of the Massachusetts Supreme Judicial Court
- Diane De Courcy, Canadian politician
- Frédéric de Courcy (1796–1862), French dramatist, poet and chansonnier
- Henri Roussel de Courcy (1827–1887), French divisional general
- Jim de Courcy (1927–2000), Australian cricketer
- John de Courcy (1150–1219), Anglo-Norman knight who arrived in Ireland in 1176
- William de Courcy (disambiguation), various people

== DeCourcey/De Courcey ==
- Jamie de Courcey (fl. 1990s–2020s), English actor
- Matt DeCourcey (born 1983), Canadian Liberal politician
- Roger De Courcey (born 1944), British ventriloquist and artists' agent

== See also ==
- Château de Courcy, ruined castle in the commune of Courcy in the south of the Calvados département of France
- De Courcy Island, one of the Gulf Islands of the coast of southwestern British Columbia, Canada
- Courcy (disambiguation)
- DeCorsey E. Bolden (1924–2016), American politician and businessman from Maryland
