= Courcy =

Courcy (in the past sometimes spelled Courci etc.) is the name or part of the name of several communes in France:

- Courcy, Calvados, in the Calvados département
- Courcy, Manche, in the Manche département
- Courcy, Marne, in the Marne département
- Courcy-aux-Loges, in the Loiret département

Courcy is the name or part of the name of:

- Robert De Coucy or Courcy, architect of Reims Cathedral, and his father of the same name.
- Richard de Courcy, a Norman baron.
- John de Courcy and many other members of this important medieval Anglo-Norman family,
- including 36 male de Courcy who have held the Irish title of Baron Kingsale.
- John de Courcy (disambiguation)
- William de Courcy (disambiguation)
- De Courcy Island, near Nanaimo, British Columbia, Canada
