= Robert fitz Martin =

12th century English lord and knight

- Arms of Baron Martin family
- Born: c. 10?? Devon, England
- Died: c. 1159
- Spouse(s): Maud Peverell, Alice de Nonant
- Military career
- Rank: Knight

Robert fitz Martin (c. 10?? – c. 1159) was a knight from Devon whose father, Martin de Turribus, was the first Norman Lord of Kemes, in what had previously been the Dyfed part of Deheubarth. Fitz Martin inherited the Lordship of Kemes from his father, and founded St Dogmaels Abbey c. 1118. He was the first of the FitzMartin line. His descendants continued to hold lands in England and Wales until the 14th century.

== Family background ==
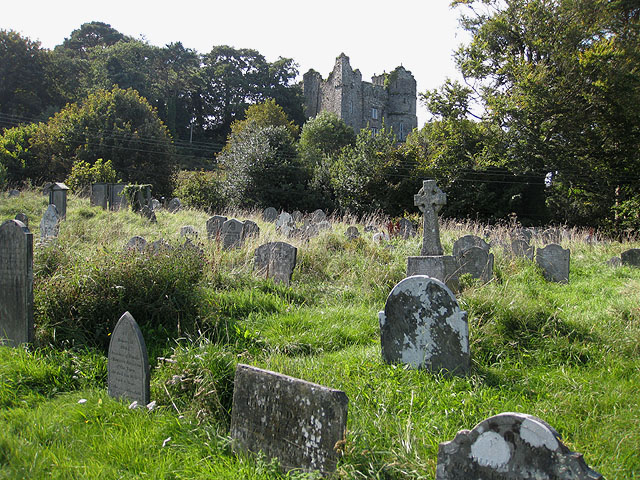
Newport Castle seen from St Mary's Churchyard. Ruins of castle founded by William fitz Martin, son of Robert fitz Martin, at the end of the 12th century. Towers, gatehouse and cellars from fitz Martin castle later incorporated into private residence.

Robert fitz Martin, was of a Frankish noble house of Blois, the great-grandson of the bellicose Eudus II, Count of Blois. He was born some time in the late 11th century to a knight of William the Conqueror, Martin de Turribus and his wife Geva de Burci, heiress of Serlo de Burci.

Martin had participated in the seizure of Rhys ap Tewdwr's lands, following the latter's refusal to acknowledge the suzerainty of William Rufus (despite having acknowledged the suzerainty of William the Conqueror), consequent attack on Worcester, and death in battle. Martin had sailed from Devon, and after landing at Fishguard, met little resistance (other than a skirmish at Morvil), becoming Marcher Lord of the area - Kemes (the name of the Lordship being a garbled version of Cemais, the name of the former Cantref); his Lordship stretched between Fishguard and Cardigan.

Geva de Burci's second husband was William de Falaise, with whom she had daughters, Emma and Sybil. "Emma de Falise married William de Courcy as her second husband. Earlier, she had been briefly married to William fitz Humphrey, but was evidently a widow soon after 1100 for, by 1106, she and her sister, Sybil, attested their father's charter without mention of their husbands. As a bride's possessions passed to her husband on marriage, he would normally attest before her but a widow acted in her own right."

Robert's half-sister, Emma de Falaise, married William de Courcy, a son of Richard de Courcy of Courcy-sur-Dives, Normandy. They received the manor of Stoke (renamed Stoke-Courcy, now Stogursey) in Somerset from William, and were grandparents of John de Courcy. This made Robert fitz Martin a brother-in-law of William de Courcy, who "was most active in royal administration during the first decade of the reign" of Henry I, to whom de Courcy was a royal dapifer.

== Life ==
Robert inherited property from his maternal grandfather, Serlo de Burci, in Somerset, Dorset, and Devon. Early in the reign of Henry I he succeeded to his father's Marcher Lordship of Kemes, setting his Caput baroniae at Nevern (Nanhyfer). Nevern Castle stood on a spur of the hill northwest of the church.

He married Maud Peverell and with her founded St Dogmaels Abbey between 1115 and 1119. Maude was a sister or daughter of William Peverel the Younger. The couple are not recorded as having any children. Not later than 1120, Robert Fitz Martin and Maud Peverel, his wife, granted to Savigny Abbey land at Vengeons (la Manche) which had belonged to William Peverel.

In 1134, he joined with the Norman lords in South Wales in resisting the sons of Gruffydd, and witnessed several charters of the Empress Maud, to whom he was adhered. During The Great Revolt 1136–1137 much of Kemes was reclaimed by the Welsh (once again becoming Cemais). Richard Fitz Gilbert de Clare, lord of Ceredigion, was ambushed and killed by the men of Iorwerth ab Owain. News of his death led to an invasion of Ceredigion by the sons of Gruffudd ap Cynan. Around Michaelmas they made an alliance with Gruffydd ap Rhys of Deheubarth. The combined forces made for Cardigan, and engaged the Normans at the Battle of Crug Mawr, two miles outside the town.

The Normans were led by Robert fitz Martin, of the Noble House of Blois, supported by the constable of Cardigan Castle (a Stephen), with the aid of Maurice FitzGerald, Lord of Lanstephan and Maurice's brother, William. After some hard fighting, the Norman forces broke and were pursued as far as the River Teifi. Many of the fugitives tried to cross the bridge, which broke under the weight, with hundreds said to have drowned, clogging the river with the bodies of men and horses. Others fled to the town of Cardigan, which however was taken and burned by the Welsh. However, Robert fitz Martin successfully managed to defend and hold the castle. It was the only one to remain in Norman hands at the end of the war.

Robert spent the years 1136–1141 serving the Empress Maud during The Anarchy, and her son, Henry II. His activities from 1142 to 1155 are unknown. In 1155, Henry II confirmed to him the lands of his grandfather, Serlo de Burci, with all their liberties.

== Second marriage and FitzMartin descendants ==
By the reign of Henry II Maud had died and Robert fitz Martin had a new wife – Alice de Nonant of Totnes (died 1194) – and three children:

1. William - married in 1159, Devon, England, Angharad, the sister of Robert's former enemy, Gruffydd ap Rhys.

- -William - married in 1195, Devon, England, to Avice De TORITON 1165-1246.
- -Nicholas = 1193-1242.

2. Sybil - married Warin de Morcells 3. Robert

Robert fitz Martin seems to have died about 1159, survived by his wife Alice and their children. Of them, Robert fitz Robert was dead by 1162 and buried in Totnes Priory. Sybil is known to have married a Warin de Morcelles and was alive in 1198.

William's eldest son inherited the family property and, via his marriage with Angharad, regained the lost territory of Kemes/Cemais. The family would continue to hold lands in both England and Wales until the extinction of the senior line in 1326. Cadet lines still flourish in England, Wales, Ireland and beyond.

== Sources ==
- The Baronial Martins, Lionel Nex, Orphington, 1987.
- The Lords of Cemais, Dilwynn Miles, Haverfordwest, 1996.
- The Tribes of Galway, Adrian J. Martyn, Galway, 2001.
- De Courcy:Anglo-Normans in Ireland, England and France in the eleventh and twelfth centuries, Steve Flanders, Four Courts Press, 2009.
- Complete Peerage, Vol VIII, pp. 530–537
- Ancestral Roots of Certain Colonists, lines 63A, 71, 122.

Preceded by Martin de Turribus	Lord of Cemais before 1115–c. 1159	Succeeded by William fitz Martin
