= William de Courcy =

William de Courcy may refer to:

- William de Courcy (died circa 1114), Anglo-Norman baron
- William de Courcy (died before 1130), son of the above
- William de Courcy (died 1171), son of the second William
