= Henry of Braybrooke =

English sheriff and justice

High Sheriff of Rutland
- In office 1211–1215

High Sheriff of Northamptonshire
- In office 1211–1215

High Sheriff of Bedfordshire and Buckinghamshire
- In office 1211–1214

Personal details
- Born: 12th century England
- Died: 1234 England
- Spouse: Christina Ledet
- Children: 3
- Parent: Robert of Braybrooke (father)

Henry of Braybrooke (died 1234) was an English sheriff and justice.

== Biography ==
Henry was the son of Robert of Braybrooke, who had served as sheriff of Buckinghamshire, Bedfordshire, Northamptonshire and Rutland, as well as Master of the Great Wardrobe, and had accumulated large amounts of land in Northamptonshire, Leicestershire, Bedfordshire, Buckinghamshire, and Essex, mainly by buying the mortgages of people who could not pay them back. One of the debts he paid off was that of Wischard Ledet, who owned Chipping Warden, and as a result Ledet's daughter and heir Christina married Henry of Braybrooke.

When Robert died in 1211, Henry followed his father's path, succeeding him as sheriff of various counties and raising more money for the king from his shires; Roger of Wendover named him one of John's "evil counsellors". In June 1213 John commissioned him to repair Northampton Castle, but in 1214 he was replaced as sheriff of Bedfordshire and Buckinhamshire, and by 1215 he had defected to the baronial faction. By mid-1215 he was among those whose forfeiture was specifically ordered by John, and after the creation of Magna Carta he was forced to forfeit his other shrievalties as well.

When hostilities began again, John had Henry's lands parcelled out to other landowners, but Henry continued to support Prince Louis of France, defending Mountsorrel Castle against the royalists and participating in the Battle of Lincoln. After the Treaty of Lambeth, Henry submitted to John's young successor, Henry III, and had many of his lands restored. Although he never became a sheriff again, he served as a royal justice in Bedfordshire and Buckinghamshire, and was tasked from 10 June 1224 to hear an Assize of novel disseisin against Falkes de Breauté; he was perfectly suited, firstly because he was a vassal of William de Beauchamp, who had had Bedford Castle taken from him by de Breauté, and secondly because de Breauté now held the shrievalties of Bedfordshire and Buckinghamshire, previous Henry's. Henry returned 16 counts of disseisins; enraged, William de Bréauté, Falkes' brother, seized him, and the allegedly brutal treatment he received led to a siege of Bedford Castle by royal forces. After the castle fell, Henry and Walter of Pattishall were ordered to destroy it.

Henry died by 1234; the precise date is not known. He was buried in Bushmead Priory, Bedfordshire, of which he was a benefactor.

== Family ==
Henry and Christiana had three children: their heir, Wischard Ledet, who was to die on crusade in the Holy Land in 1241 with Christiana's second husband (Gerard de Furnival); John of Braybrooke; and Margery, who was married to Simon of Pattishall, son and heir of Walter.

== Notes ==
Political offices
Preceded by Robert of Braybrooke	High Sheriff of Bedfordshire and Buckinghamshire; 1211–1214	Succeeded by Hugh Le Gournay
Preceded by Robert of Braybrooke	High Sheriff of Northamptonshire; 1211–1215	Succeeded by Falkes de Breauté
Preceded by Robert of Braybrooke	High Sheriff of Rutland; 1211–1215	Succeeded by Falkes de Breauté
