= Warin II fitzGerold =

Anglo-Norman knight and nobleman (c.1167 – c. 1218)

Sir Warin FitzGeroldwas also known as Sir Warin FitzGerald the Younger, c.1167 – c.1218.

== Biography ==
Warin was born in the reign of King Henry II. His father Henry fitzGerold was Chamberlain to the King. Sir Warin served the next monarch, King Richard I, as a Knight on the Third Crusade. He subsequently served King John as Chamberlain of the Exchequer.

The itinerary for King Richard I - 8 June 1191 reveals that Warin was at the Siege of Acre, one of the bloodiest parts of the Third Crusade. Whilst hunting with the King, the party was attacked by some forces of Saladin, and he and some other knights helped save the life of the King.

Warin married Alice de Courcy, daughter of William de Courcy. With this marriage he inherited Stogursey Castle near Bridgwater in Somerset, England. Alice's mother was Juliana, the daughter of Richer D'Aquila, 2nd Baron of Pevensey Castle in Sussex. The male line of the Aquila family ceased with the death of Gilbert, the 4th Baron, in 1231. The coat of Arms of three spread eagles, bearings of Aquila, passed to Warin II, as husband of Alice. King John visited his Chamberlain at Stogursey in 1210.

Warin also held the manor at Seaforth in Sussex. There had been a port at Seaforth since Roman times; more importantly, it is near the River Ouse, which was used to carry goods right up to the county town of Lees.

Warin died in 1218.
