= John de Courcy (disambiguation) =

John de Courcy (1160–1219), was a Norman English noble.

John de Courcy may also refer to:

- John de Courcy, one of several men with the title Baron Kingsale in the Peerage of Ireland
  - John Fitzroy de Courcy, 31st Baron Kingsale (1821–1890), colonel of the 16th Ohio Infantry
  - John de Courcy, 35th Baron Kingsale (1941–2005), the Premier Baron of Ireland
- John de Courcy Ireland (1911–2006), Irish historian and activist
- John Edmund de Courcy, English bishop in Ireland
