= William de Courcy (died before 1130) =

12th-century Anglo-Norman nobleman

William de Courcy was an Anglo-Norman nobleman and baron.

William was the son of William de Courcy and his wife Emma de Falaise. Through his mother, William inherited the barony of Stogursey in Somerset, as his mother was the sole heir of William de Falaise, the lord of Stogursey in Domesday Book. William and Emma were also the parents of two other sons: Richard and Robert.

William married Avice, the daughter and coheir of William Meschin, and Cecily de Rumilly. The marriage took place around 1125.

William, along with his brother Robert, confirmed the gift of his father of the advowson of the church of Nuneham Courtenay in Oxfordshire to Abingdon Abbey. This reconfirmation of his father's grant was recorded in the abbey's chronicle, the Historia Ecclesie Abbendonensis, like the original grant had been. William then gave further lands to the abbey, including a meadow named "cow mead" and a pasture large enough for 300 sheep, 8 oxen and 10 cows.

William died before 1130. William's widow married William Paynel, son of Ralph Paynel. His heir was his son William de Courcy. Another son was Robert, who was steward to King Stephen of England. But Marjorie Chibnall thinks this Robert is a cousin, from the Norman branch.
