= Bedford Castle =

Medieval castle in Bedford, England

- Bedford, Bedfordshire, England
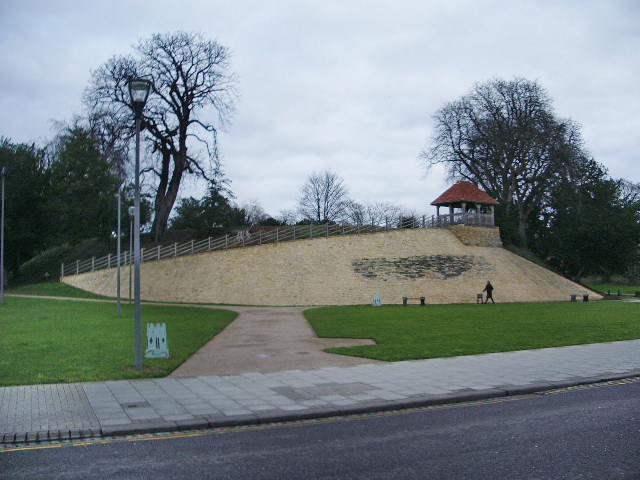
- Remaining motte of Bedford Castle

Site information
- Type: Motte and bailey
- Condition: Destroyed, part of motte remains

Location
- Shown within Bedfordshire
- Location within Bedfordshire
- Coordinates: 52.13539°N 0.46333°W
- Grid reference: grid reference TL052496

Site history
- Materials: Stone

Bedford Castle was a large medieval castle in Bedford, England. Built after 1100 by Henry I, the castle played a prominent part in both the civil war of the Anarchy and the First Barons' War. The castle was significantly extended in stone, although the final plan of the castle remains uncertain. Henry III of England besieged the castle in 1224 following a disagreement with Falkes de Bréauté; the siege lasted eight weeks and involved an army of as many as 2,700 soldiers with equipment drawn from across England. After the surrender of the castle, the king ordered its destruction (slighting).

Although partially refortified in the 17th century during the English Civil War, the castle remained a ruin until the urban expansion in Bedford during the 19th century, when houses were built across much of the property. Today only part of the motte still stands, forming part of an archaeological park built on the site between 2007 and 2009.

== History ==
=== Early history (1100–1153) ===
Bedford Castle was probably built after 1100 by Henry I in the town of Bedford, overlooking the River Great Ouse. The castle was constructed inside the town itself, and many of the older Anglo-Saxon streets had to be destroyed and diverted to make room for it, leaving a permanent mark in the formal grid system. The castle was built in a motte and bailey design and was probably much smaller than the later castle, just consisting of the motte and the inner bailey.

By the early 12th century the castle was controlled by the royal castellan, Simon de Beauchamp, the son of Hugh de Beauchamp who had helped conquer England in 1066. Contemporaries described the castle around this time as "completely ramparted around with an immense earthen bank and ditch, girt about with a wall strong and high, strengthened with a strong and unshakeable keep". Simon died in 1137, and King Stephen agreed that Simon's daughter should marry Hugh the Pauper and that the castle would be given to Hugh, in exchange for Stephen giving Miles compensatory honours and gifts. Miles and Payn de Beauchamp, the children of Simon's brother, Robert de Beauchamp, declared that the castle was rightfully Miles' and refused to hand it over to Hugh.

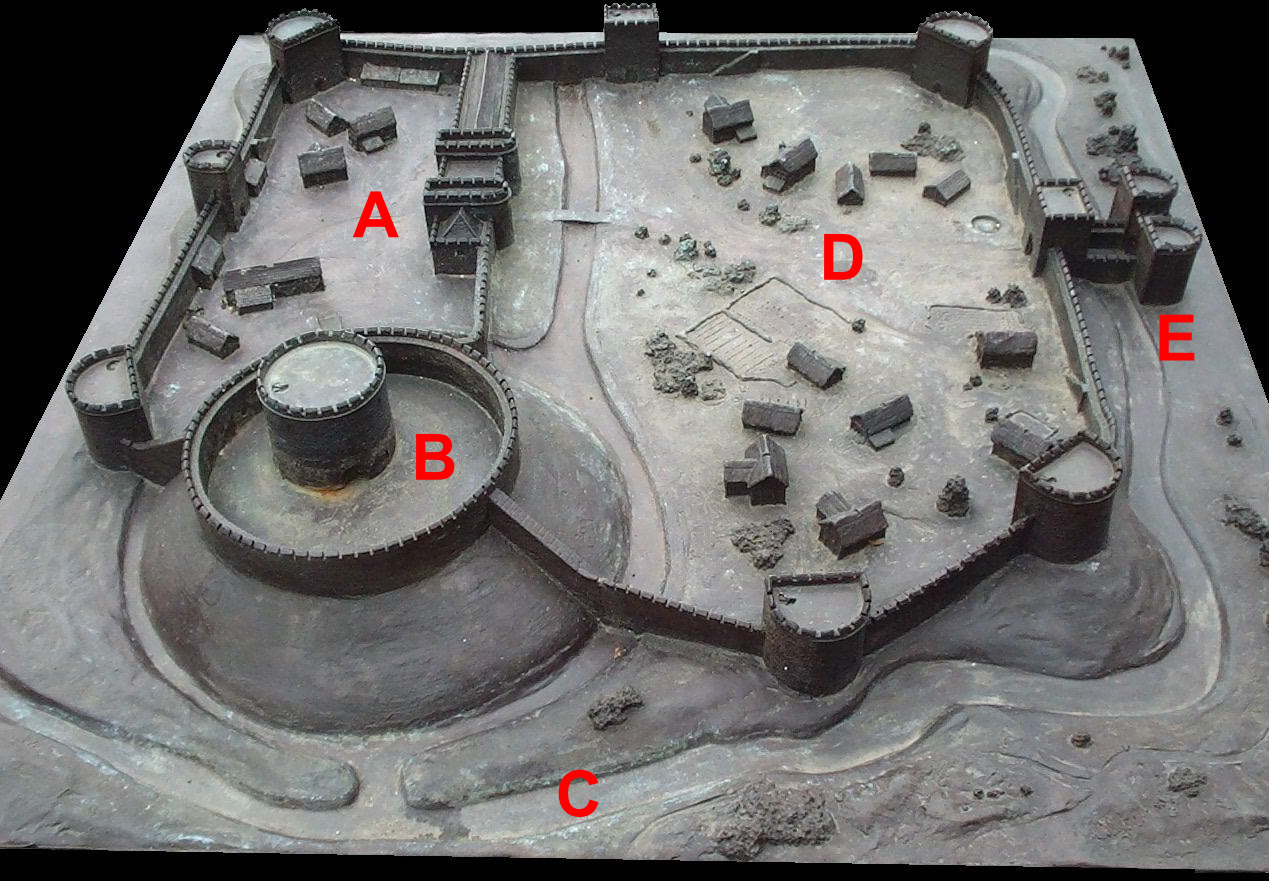
A reconstruction of how Bedford Castle may possibly have appeared in 1224; A – inner bailey; B – keep; C – moat, fed by the River Great Ouse; D – outer bailey; E – gatehouse (Note: The exact layout of Bedford Castle in 1224 remains uncertain; the model depicted here predates the archaeological excavations in 2007.)

Meanwhile, civil war had broken out in England between King Stephen and the Empress Matilda, resulting in a period of chaos known as the Anarchy. Matilda's uncle, David I of Scotland, invaded England during 1137 in support of her claim. Although Miles de Beauchamp declared himself in support of Stephen, the king decided to retake Bedford Castle before marching north. Stephen formed an army to besiege Bedford Castle but Miles gained advance warning of the attack and took in considerable supplies, preparing for a long siege. Stephen was unable to storm the castle and left a force under the command of Hugh to starve it into submission whilst he marched north to tackle the Scots invasion.

Henry of Blois, the Bishop of Winchester, intervened in an attempt to produce a negotiated solution. Henry reached an agreement whereby after five weeks, the castle finally surrendered; the garrison were allowed to leave peacefully but the castle was handed over to the king. The deal struck by Miles and Henry appears to have left the surrounding estates in the hands of the Beauchamps, however, and in 1141 Miles returned and retook the castle itself, although no details are available as to how he achieved this.

Miles subsequently supported the Empress, and in 1146, Ranulf, the Earl of Chester and temporarily on the side of the king, attacked and took the town of Bedford, but was unable to take the castle, which continued to be controlled by Miles until his death several years later. Towards the end of the war, Bedford Castle may have been attacked again; Henry II, during the final year of the conflict in 1153, marched through Bedford and documentary evidence shows damage to the town at this time. Historians are divided as to whether the castle was besieged at the same time. (Note: The events of 1153 at Bedford Castle are unclear. Jim Bradbury interprets the damage to the town as suggesting a failed attack on the castle, implying that the pro-Angevin de Beauchamps were no longer in control of it. David Baker and W. L. Warren suggest an attack on the town occurred, but make no suggestion that the castle was attacked, which would allow for continued pro-Angevin control of the fortification itself.)

=== Mid-medieval period (1153–1224) ===
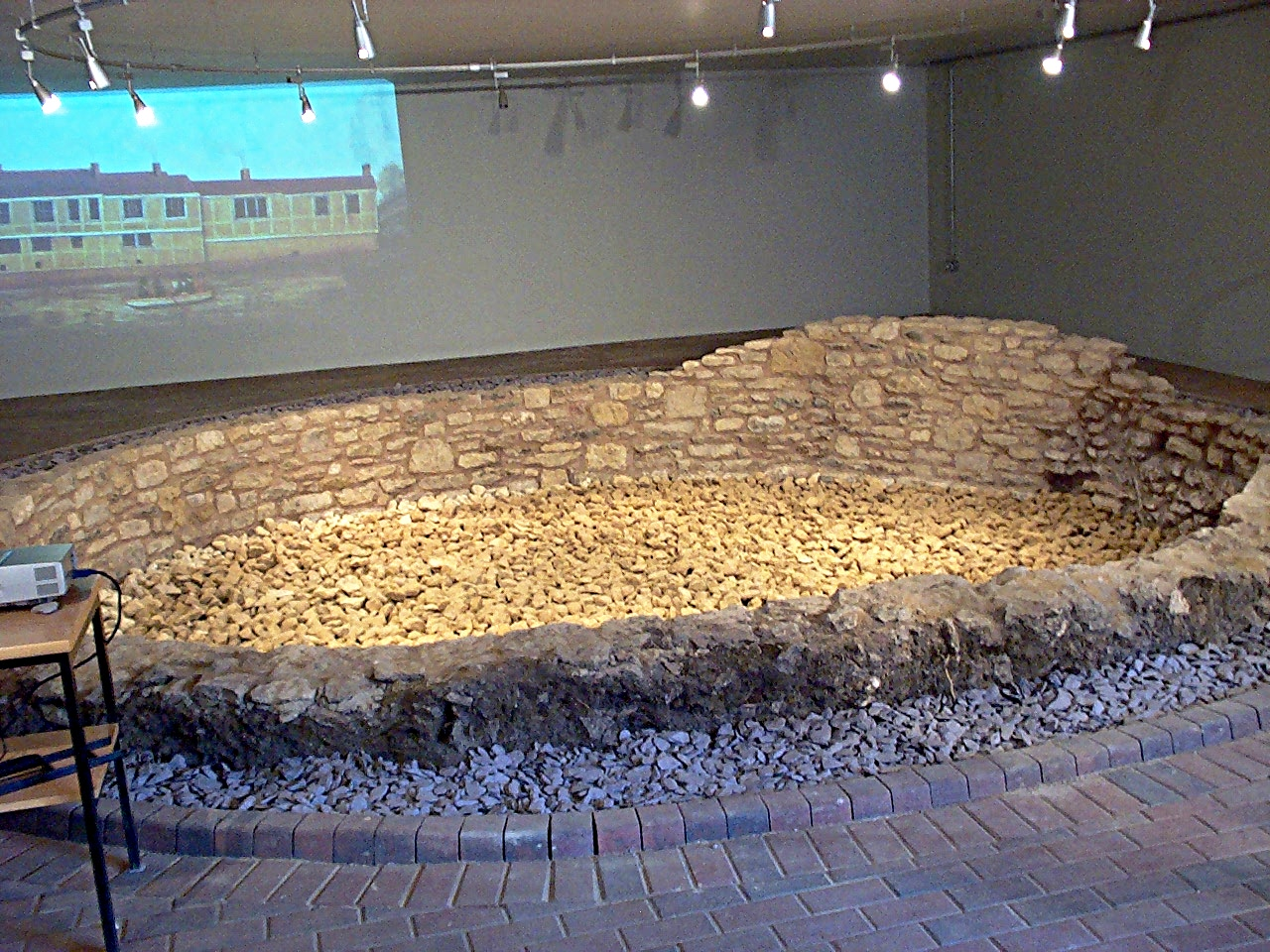
The medieval lime kiln preserved as part of the archaeological park at Bedford Castle

Early in 1215 tensions grew between King John and a rebel faction of his barons, which would lead to the First Barons' War. The rebel barons attempted to besiege Northampton Castle; unsuccessful, they turned to Bedford Castle but the castle withstood the attack and they moved south to London. Bedford was held at the time by William de Beauchamp but his loyalty came into question and he rebelled against John. Falkes de Breauté, a key Anglo-Norman leader loyal to John, resisted and seized Bedford Castle back for John in 1216. In return John gave Falkes the Honour of Bedford, and in practical terms the castle as well, although it is unclear whether he gave Falkes the role of castellan or ownership of the castle itself. (Note: Nigel Pounds argues the legal status of the castle at this time was unclear, and that it may have formed part of the Honour of Bedford as a baronial castle; David Baker suspects that it had remained a royal castle.) As the war continued, Falkes took control of Plympton, Christchurch and Carisbrooke castles, whilst continuing to hold onto Bedford. After the death of King John in 1216 the war turned against the rebel barons and the royalist faction, including Falkes, was able to restore his son, the young Henry III to power in England.

After the war, Falkes made Bedford Castle his headquarters and he expanded it considerably, resulting in what David Baker has described as a "major refortification". Falkes destroyed the neighbouring churches of St Paul's and St Cuthbert's to make space for a new bailey, reusing the stone for the castle. The exact form of the castle after this expansion remains uncertain. The castle appears to have been quadrangular, with the western edge running along the rear of the modern High Street and the northern edge running along the modern roads of Ram Yard and Castle Lane. The castle had a new barbican; an outer and an inner bailey, with the inner bailey in the south-east corner, protected by an internal ditch and a stone-lined palisade; further stone lined ditches lay around the castle; and a new keep was built on the motte. Brown suspects that the new keep was probably a shell keep with a tower, similar to those built at Launceston or Bungay. The stone-lined palisades and ditches built at Bedford were very unusual in England – their closest equivalent are those found at Skenfrith Castle in Wales. The castle had a postern watergate facing towards the river, and a great hall within the inner bailey in the middle, at least 13 m (43 feet) wide and 40 m (131 feet) long. There was possibly a large stone gatehouse positioned on the outer bailey wall. A mound in the north-east corner of the castle probably supported a large tower.

==== Siege of 1224 ====
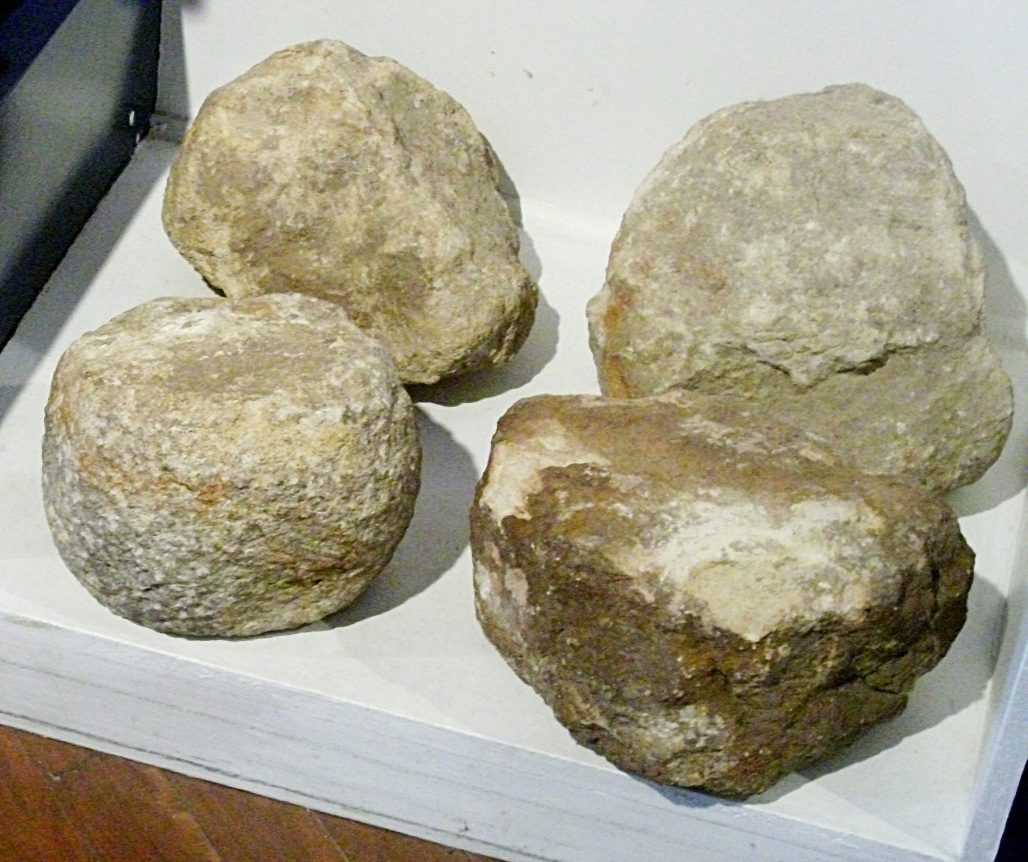
Mangonel shot, discovered at the castle in the 1970s and probably dating from the 1224 siege

Henry III decided that Bedford Castle should be returned to its original owner, William de Beauchamp, and became increasingly frustrated with Falkes' refusal to do so; matters came to a head when Falkes' castellans imprisoned Henry of Braybrooke, a royal judge who was hearing law cases against Falkes. When Falkes refused to release the judge, Henry mobilised an army, supported by the Church in the form of Stephen Langton, the Archbishop of Canterbury, and advanced to Bedford. (Note: Historian Emilie Amt notes that Falkes' timing was "almost comically inept", since the king was already gathered with his barons to hold court at Northampton, only a few miles away.) Falkes had left the castle, along with around eighty men, in charge of his brother, William de Breauté, who refused to surrender it to the king. Falkes was probably hoping that if the castle held on long enough, his efforts to convince Pope Honorius III to intervene against Henry would succeed. The Archbishop excommunicated William and the siege began. (Note: The 1224 siege is unusually well documented by medieval standards, due to the local annalists at Dunstable Priory who recorded the events in some detail.)

The siege of Bedford Castle required huge resources. Siege engines were brought from Lincoln, Northampton and Oxfordshire, while carpenters built others on site using timber from Northamptonshire; ropes from London, Cambridge and Southampton; hides from Northampton and tallow from London. Labourers from across Bedfordshire and Northamptonshire were gathered by the relevant sheriffs, and miners from Hereford and the Forest of Dean. Crossbow bolts were ordered from a depot at Corfe Castle and from the provinces; 43,300 crossbow bolts are known to have been ordered by the king. Local trees were cut down, and stone quarrying begun to provide ammunition for siege engines. Tents and pavilions for the King were sent from London along with supplies of luxury foods and wine, also for the King. In total, Henry's wage bill for the siege came to £1,311; (Note: It is impossible to accurately compare 13th century and modern prices or incomes. For comparison, £1,311 is almost seven times the annual income of an average baron of the period.) it is uncertain exactly how large Henry's army was, but potentially there were between 1,600 and 2,700 men present at any one time. To support the siege, Langton instructed his bishops to mobilise one man from every 24 hectares (60 acres) of land they owned and levied a special tax on the churches' estates.

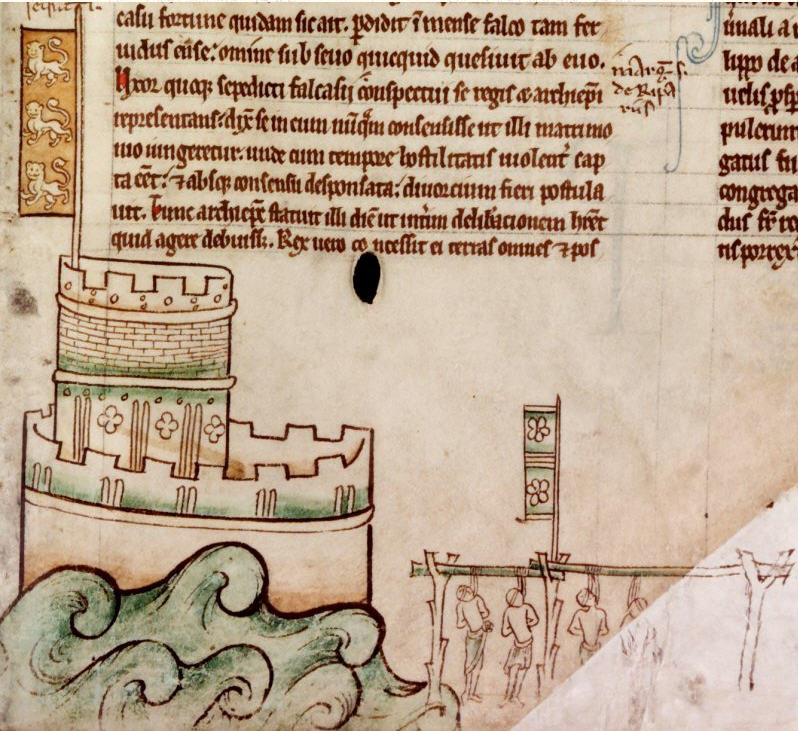
A near-contemporary sketch by Matthew Paris of the keep and tower of Bedford Castle (l) during the 1224 siege, and the execution of the garrison after their surrender (r)

With these resources, Henry erected a number of siege engines around the castle; one probable trebuchet and two mangonels were set up to the east of the castle; two mangonels were placed on the west side, to attack the keep, and one mangonel on both the north and south sides. (Note: The historical accounts are unclear as to exactly what siege artillery was used at Bedford: the medieval terminology applied to these weapons was vague. Historian Emilie Amt argues that the quantities of rope and manpower required for the engines may imply that the mangonels were in fact what we would today call traction trebuchets.) Two siege-castles were established to observe the occupants of the castle. William was confident, however, that either his brother would return and relieve the siege, or that the pope would intervene, and held on despite the artillery attacks. The losses in the royal army began to mount; chronicler Ralph of Coggeshall suggests that seven knights, and over 200 soldiers and labourers were killed as the siege dragged on.

Bedford Castle finally fell through a sequence of four attacks. Royal forces first captured the barbican and then stormed the outer bailey, seizing most of the castle's supplies but taking considerable losses. Miners, operating under the protection of a "cat", then gained access to the inner bailey by collapsing part of the wall. (Note: R. Brown believes that this phase of the operations refers instead to Henry's forces gaining access to the shell keep.) Finally, on 14 August, the miners attacked the keep itself, lighting a fire under the walls, cracking the stone and filling the building with smoke. The female members of the household, including Falkes' wife, and Henry de Braybrooke were released, the royal standard was raised over the tower, and the next day William and the garrison surrendered.

A discussion ensued about the fate of the garrison; near contemporary accounts suggest that the prisoners asked the Archbishop for assistance, but that this was declined. Henry then had all the male members of the garrison hanged, except for three knights who agreed to join the military order of the Knights Templar. Three days after the fall of Bedford Castle, the Pope wrote a letter demanding that Henry cease his campaign against Falkes, but this intervention had occurred far too late to be of use. Alexander de Stavenby, the Bishop of Coventry, convinced Falkes to surrender after the fall of the castle; he handed over his remaining castles at Plympton and Storgursey and was absolved by Langton, going into exile shortly afterwards. Historian R. Brown has noted that the 1224 siege of Bedford Castle was remarkable in that the castle's garrison was able to hold out against "the concentrated military resources of the whole kingdom" for an impressive eight weeks. David Carpenter argues that the fall of Bedford castle "concluded the triumph of central government" over the previously uncontrollable forces of the local barons but that the resources invested in the siege diverted from activities elsewhere and contributed to the loss of La Rochelle to the army of Louis VIII of France.

=== Later history (13–19th centuries) ===
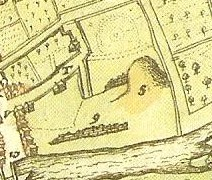
Bedford Castle in John Speed's map of 1611, showing the motte and remaining fragments of the bailey walls

After the siege Henry III ordered the castle to be dismantled, and labourers filled in the ditches and halved the height of the stone walls. William de Beauchamp was forbidden to rebuild the castle, and instead built an unfortified house in the inner bailey. St Paul's and St Cuthbert's churches were rebuilt in 1224 using stone from the castle. The sudden availability of cheap stone led to the repaving of many of the town streets in Bedford in 1224. Local tradition suggests that the first stone bridge at Bedford, the Great Bridge, was built using stone from the castle. By 1361 the castle site was described as "a void plot of old enclosed by walls" and seems to have been derelict for most of the medieval period. The antiquarian John Leland visited the site in the 16th century, and noted that the castle was "now clean down". The early 17th-century mapmaker John Speed produced a map of Bedford in 1611, showing the motte and a fragment of bailey wall still standing on an otherwise vacant site.

At the outbreak of the English Civil War, Bedford sided with Parliament; the town was temporarily captured by Prince Rupert of the Rhine in 1643 and the castle was refortified for the duration of the war. A probable wooden fort and prison were built on the remains of the motte and defended by a hundred-man garrison. After the war the motte became used as a bowling green until the 19th century. In 1804 the north-east tower of the castle was turned into a hexagonal building for the local militia unit. Bedford began to spread eastwards in the late 19th century and the castle baileys became desirable property for housing; in 1851 the last parts of the barbican were destroyed to make way for the construction of cottages.

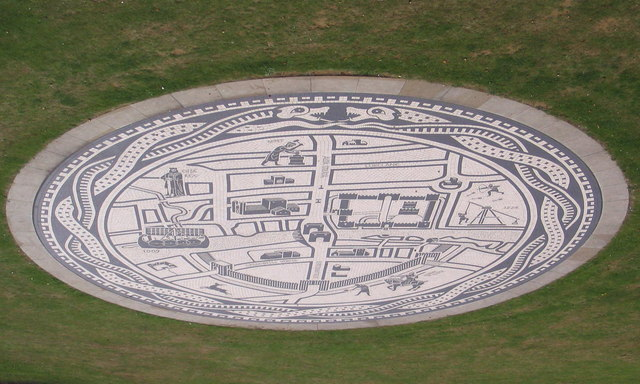
In 2004 Bedford Borough Council commissioned artist Gary Drostle to create a mosaic map of Bedford depicting the medieval history of the town.

=== Modern period (20–21st centuries) ===
Today only the base of the motte survives at Bedford Castle, 7.5 m (25 feet) high and 49 m (161 feet) wide at the top, and is a scheduled monument. Archaeological work has been conducted to develop a better understanding of the history of the castle, although excavations are difficult because of the urban nature of the site. Excavations between 1969 and 1973 established the broad form of the castle; this was supplemented by further work in 1995–6 and another phase of excavations in 2007. Following the 2007 investigations, an archaeological park was built on part of the castle site between 2007 and 2009, forming the centre of a mixed-use development of restaurants and apartments. The park incorporated one of the castle's lime kilns, first rediscovered in 1973, and the foundations of a hall discovered at the castle.

In 2004 Bedford Borough Council commissioned artist Gary Drostle to create a mosaic map of Bedford depicting the castle and Bedford's medieval history in front of the castle mound.

== See also ==
- Castles in Great Britain and Ireland
- List of castles in England

== Bibliography ==
- Albion Archaeology. (2005) Extensive Urban Survey for Bedfordshire: Bedford Archaeological Assessment, Document 2001/42 Project 510. Bedford: Albion Archaeology.
- Amt, Emilie. (2002) "Besieging Bedford: Military Logistics in 1224," Journal of Medieval Military History 1, pp. 101–124. doi:10.7722/j.ctt7zssh1.9
- Baker, David. (1973) "Bedford Castle: Some Preliminary Results from Rescue Excavations," in Chateau Gaillard 6, pp. 15–21.
- Bradbury, Jim. (1992) The Medieval Siege. Woodbridge, UK: Boydell Press. ISBN 978-0-85115-312-4.
- Bradbury, Jim. (2009) Stephen and Matilda: the Civil War of 1139–53. Stroud, UK: The History Press. ISBN 978-0-7509-3793-1.
- Brown, R. Allen. (1962) English Castles. London: Batsford. OCLC 1392314.
- Carpenter, David. (1990) The Minority of Henry III. Berkeley, US: University of California Press. ISBN 978-0-520-07239-8.
- Godber, Joyce. (1969) History of Bedfordshire, 1066–1888. Bedford: Bedfordshire County Council.
- Harsthorne, Charles Henry. (1861) Bedford Castle. Holdenby: Private Distribution. OCLC 499798248.
- King, Edmund. (2010) King Stephen. New Haven, US: Yale University Press. ISBN 978-0-300-11223-8.
- Liddiard, Robert. (2005) Castles in Context: Power, Symbolism and Landscape, 1066 to 1500. Macclesfield, UK: Windgather Press. ISBN 0-9545575-2-2.
- Pounds, Norman John Greville. (1994) The Medieval Castle in England and Wales: a Social and Political History. Cambridge: Cambridge University Press. ISBN 978-0-521-45828-3.
- Powicke, Maurice. (1962) The Thirteenth Century, 1216–1307. Oxford: Clarendon Press. OCLC 604048091.
- Thompson, M. W. (1994) The Decline of the Castle. Leicester, UK: Harveys Books. ISBN 1-85422-608-8.
- Warren, W. L. (2000) Henry II. New Haven, US: Yale University Press. ISBN 0-300-08474-9.
