= William de Courcy (died 1171) =

12th-century Anglo-Norman nobleman and baron

William de Courcy (sometimes William de Curci; died 1171) was an Anglo-Norman nobleman and baron.

William was the son of William de Courcy and Avice de Rumilly, the daughter of William Meschin.

William can be considered the baron of Stogursey in Somerset, through his paternal grandmother, who was the heiress of William de Falaise. The "head" of the barony was at Stogursey, but it also held lands in Northamptonshire, Oxfordshire, Devonshire, Wiltshire, and Essex. The bulk of the lands, however, were in Northamptonshire and Oxfordshire. In 1166, William owed just over 29 knight's fees for his lands from his father, plus another 17 fees for lands he inherited from his mother. In later years, William owed scutage on 24.75 fees for Stogursey and 16.5 for his mother's lands.

William married Gundrada, the daughter of Reginald de Warenne. Gundrada was the widow of Peter de Valognes.

William died in 1171. His heir was a son, William de Courcy, who died in 1194. The elder William also had a daughter, Alice, who was his eventual heiress, after the death of her brother. Alice married Henry de Cornhill first and then after his death she married Warin fitzGerold.
