= Robert of Braybrooke =

Medieval landowner and sheriff

Robert of Braybrooke or Robert le May (1168–1210) was a medieval landowner, justice and sheriff.

He was born at Braybrooke, Northamptonshire the son of justiciar Ingebald de Braybrooke and his wife Albreda de Neumarche, daughter of Ivo de Neumarche Lord of Braybrook and Emma de St. Liz.

Le May accumulated more land in several counties by paying off the mortgages of people in financial difficulties. he was responsible for the building of Braybrooke Castle, a fortified manor house.

He served as a justiciar in 100 and 1207. He was appointed High Sheriff of Bedfordshire and Buckinghamshire (1206–1212), High Sheriff of Northamptonshire (1209–1212) and High Sheriff of Rutland (1211–1214). He was also appointed by King John as Master of the Great Wardrobe and a member of the king's council. He was listed with his son Henry by Roger of Wendover among King John's evil counsellors.

Le May died in 1210 and was succeeded by his eldest son Henry, who also became a sheriff, sometimes sharing the post with his father. His other son was Gerard.

Political offices
Preceded by The Earl of Essex	High Sheriff of Bedfordshire and Buckinghamshire; 1204–1211; With: Robert Fitz Hemeri 1204–1205	Succeeded by Henry of Braybrooke
