= Henry fitzGerold =

12th-century Anglo-Norman royal official

Constable of Wallingford Castle
- In office 1154–1158

Chamberlain to Henry II of England
- In office c. 1158 – 1170

Personal details
- Died: 1174–1175
- Resting place: Reading Abbey
- Spouse: Matilda de Chesney
- Relations: Warin fitzGerold (brother)
- Children: Warin the Younger; Henry

Henry fitzGerold (sometimes Henry Fitz Gerald or Henry Fitzgerald; died c. 1174) was a 12th-century Anglo-Norman nobleman and government official.

== Early life ==
FitzGerold was probably the son of Robert fitzGerald, an Essex landowner. Henry definitely had a brother named Warin. The brothers' first appearance in the documentary record was as witnesses to the foundation document of Walden Abbey, sometime between 1138 and 1144. Henry subsequently witnessed a number of the future King Henry II's charters before the latter's accession to the throne of England. Soon after 1154, he was appointed constable of Wallingford Castle. Henry II sent him to Sens on a diplomatic mission to the pope in 1163.

== Career ==
FitzGerold was the steward to Geoffrey de Mandeville, 2nd Earl of Essex, from around 1154, as well as holding land worth 4 knight's fees from Mandeville. From 1158 to 1170 he was chamberlain to Henry II, succeeding his brother Warin. Besides the lands held of Mandeville, Henry and Warin acquired the majority of the lands of Eudo Dapifer; Henry's share amounted to more than 50 knight's fees in Essex in 1166. FitzGerold also had the farm of the royal manor of Sutton Courtenay in Berkshire, which was worth £50 per annum. From 1166 until 1168 he was responsible for royal payments to knights in Kent. He also served as a royal justice in Kent during 1168–1169.

== Death and legacy ==
FitzGerold married Matilda de Chesney, the heiress of William de Chesney. They had two sons, Warin and Henry. The elder fitzGerold died in 1174–1175, and was survived by Matilda and his sons. He was buried at Reading Abbey. Besides grants to Reading, he had also given gifts to Southwark Priory and to the cathedral chapter of Rochester Cathedral.

FitzGerold's eldest son Warin inherited the majority of his father's estates. Warin married Alice de Courcy. Warin's daughter Margaret married Baldwin de Redvers, and their son was Baldwin de Redvers, the sixth Earl of Devon. The younger Henry married Ermentrude Talbot and became prominent in the service of William Marshall, the first Earl of Pembroke.
