= Falkes de Bréauté =

Anglo-Norman soldier (died 1226)

- Arms of Sir Falkes de Bréauté: Gules, a cinquefoil argent (As depicted inverted by Matthew Paris (d.1259) in his Chronica Majora (folio 64/68 verso), to mark de Breauté's death)
- Died: 1226; Rome, Byzantine Empire
- Spouse: Margaret Fitzgerald
- Military career
- Allegiance: King John; King Henry III
- Wars: First Barons' War

Sir Falkes de Bréauté (died 1226) (also spelled Fawkes de Bréauté or Fulk de Brent) was an Anglo-Norman soldier who earned high office by loyally serving first King John and later King Henry III in the First Barons' War. He played a key role in the Battle of Lincoln Fair in 1217. He attempted to rival Hubert de Burgh, and as a result fell from power in 1224. His "heraldic device" is now popularly said to have been a griffin, although his coat of arms as depicted by Matthew Paris (died 1259) in his Chronica Majora (folio 64/68 verso) was Gules, a cinquefoil argent.

Falkes' home in London was then called "Fawkes Hall" (Falkes' Hall), which over the years changed into "Foxhall" and finally into "Vauxhall". The Vauxhall car company derived its name from that part of London and still uses de Bréauté's griffin as its badge. The house stood on approximately 31 acres (13 ha) in the royal manor of Kennington; it was the centre of tension between the Archbishop at Lambeth Palace and the monks of Canterbury, who tried to influence the election of English bishops.

== Early life ==
De Bréauté was of obscure Norman parentage, and has been described as the illegitimate child of a Norman knight and a concubine, possibly a knightly family from the village of Bréauté in Normandy. Most chroniclers, however, describe him as from common stock, and he was often referred to only by his first name, which was said to be derived from the scythe ("faux" in modern French) he had once used to murder someone, as a sign of contempt.

== Service under John ==
The first accurate records of his royal service are from 1206, when he was sent to Poitou by King John on royal service. Upon his return in February 1207 he was entrusted with the wardenship of Glamorgan and Wenlock, and around that time also knighted. He was then made constable of Carmarthen, Cardigan and the Gower Peninsula, and gained a fearsome reputation in the Welsh Marches. He was sent to destroy Strata Florida Abbey in 1212 for its opposition to the king, though the abbey was spared after the abbot paid a heavy fine of 700 Marks. He served regularly in royal service, including in trips to Flanders and Poitou, and was in high favour with the king. It is often said that he was a foreign mercenary condemned by Magna Carta; this is incorrect, and he was actually one of the royalists who swore to abide by the charter's terms.

Bréauté rose to power during the First Barons' War as an unquestioning subject of King John, earning the hatred of baronial and monastic leaders alike. He earned the title of John's steward in 1215, a title he kept until the following year. On 28 November 1215, de Bréauté captured Hanslope, Buckinghamshire, a castle of William Mauduit, and he soon after captured Bedford Castle belonging to William de Beauchamp, and in reward was allowed to keep it. In 1216 John divided his army between William Longespée, 3rd Earl of Salisbury and four "alien" captains, one of whom was de Bréauté. When Prince Louis of France invaded in the same year de Bréauté was tasked with holding Oxford against the baronial forces. On 17 July he and the Earl of Chester sacked Worcester, which had allied itself with Louis. In reward John gave de Bréauté the hand of Margaret the daughter of Warin Fitzgerald, the royal chamberlain. She was the widow of Baldwin de Revières (Redvers), former heir to the Earl of Devon, who had died in 1216, and after the death of the 5th Earl in 1217 her son became the 6th Earl. So this marriage made de Bréauté "the equal of an earl" as he was regent for the Earldom until his stepson the 6th Earl reached his majority. As Margaret's dowry he gained control of the Isle of Wight, and as part of her inheritance took Stogursey, also becoming chamberlain to the Exchequer. When John died on 19 October de Bréauté served as the executor of his will, and was one of the royalists who reissued Magna Carta on 12 November 1216.

== Service under Henry III ==
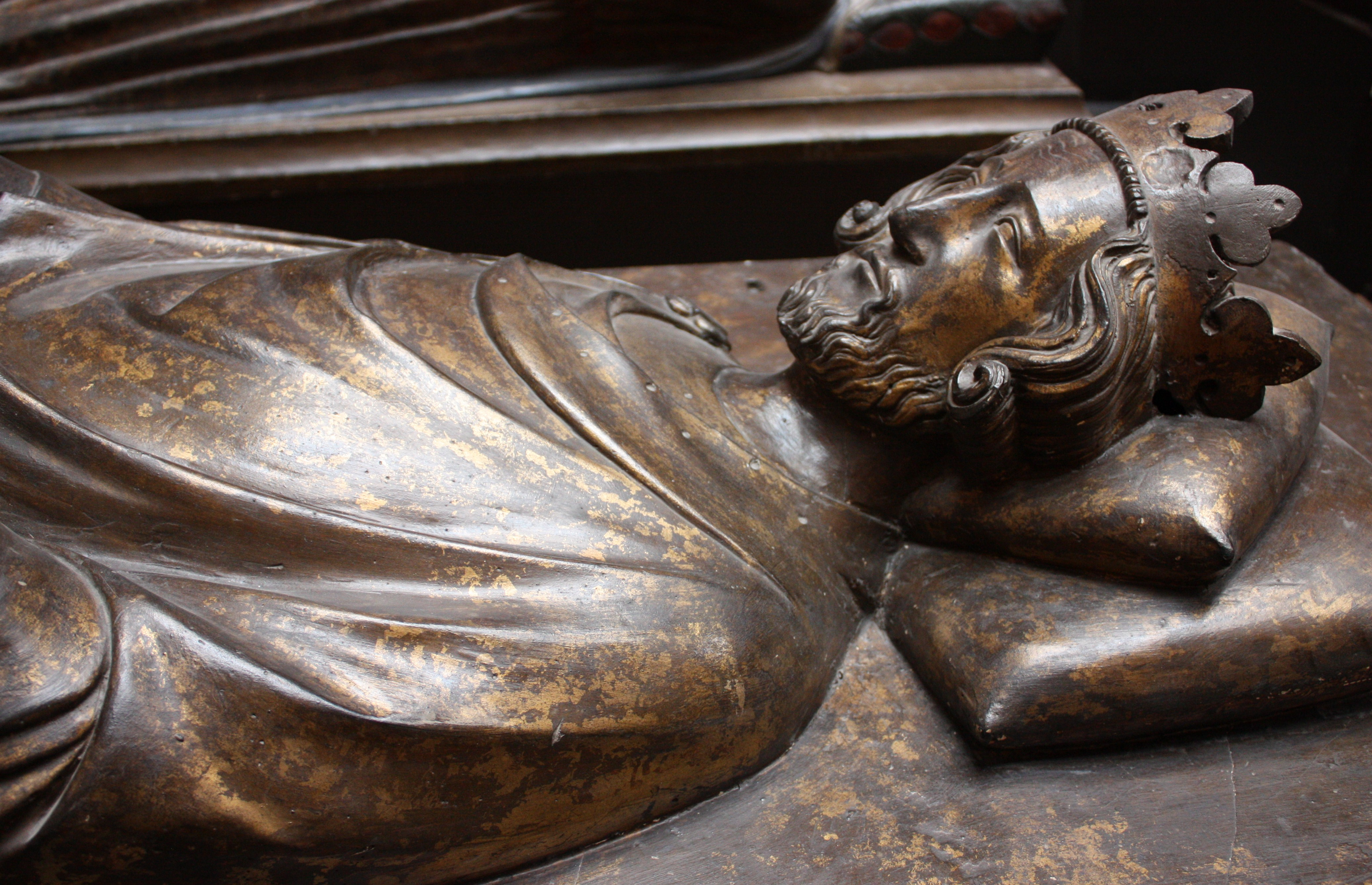
Copy of the 13th-century tomb effigy of King Henry III in Westminster Abbey, under whom Falkes de Bréauté served.

Under Henry III de Bréauté continued to fight with the same loyalty he had shown John. The Charter of liberties was a re-issue of Magna Carta and alongside it a Charter of Forests. The two were known as Magna Carta when published in November 1217. That Christmas the regents and Henry stayed at Fawkes castle in Northampton. He was holding seven High Sheriffdoms including Cambridgeshire, Oxfordshire, Buckinghamshire, Northamptonshire and Bedfordshire he presented a major obstacle to Louis and the barons, although he lost Hertford and Cambridge in 1217. On 22 January 1217 de Bréauté and his men had committed their worst atrocity, attacking St Albans because it had come to terms with Prince Louis, although it had done so under duress. After attacking the townspeople his men turned on the abbey, killing the abbot's cook and only leaving after blackmailing the abbot for 200 marks. His men also attacked Wardon Abbey, and although he eventually compensated St Albans it was felt he only did so to please his wife.

At the end of February he led a royalist force in an unsuccessful attempt to relieve the port of Rye. After this he captured the Isle of Ely, before playing a critical role in the campaign leading up to the Battle of Lincoln Fair. He joined the Earl of Chester to besiege Mountsorrel, and in response the rebels were forced to divide their forces, with Prince Louis and half his forces remaining at the siege of Dover while the rest marched north to relieve Mountsorrel. After achieving this the rebels marched to Lincoln to assist a rebel force besieging Lincoln Castle; while the town had fallen to the rebels, the castle garrison had remained loyal to King Henry. By the time they got there the royalist force had already arrived under the command of William Marshal, 1st Earl of Pembroke, and he forced a battle in the streets of the town itself. Before the battle began de Bréauté had led his force into the castle itself, and his crossbowmen shot down at the rebel force from the walls. Sallying out himself, with such force that he was captured before being rescued by his men, he fought on until the rebels fled, with even the Angevin leaders acknowledging his role in a critical victory against superior forces.

In reward for his role in the victory the royal court celebrated Christmas at his expense at Northampton, but this proved the climax of his career. After the battle he was one of the many fighters who was alienated by Hubert de Burgh, Justiciar of England, over them keeping the castles they had captured for their own profit. Due to his role in the campaign and the victory at Lincoln itself he was unassailable for many years; he deflected judgements made against him in 1218 and 1219 and kept hold of his High Sheriffdoms, including that of Rutland. Between 1218 and 1219 he also served as a Justice of the Peace for Essex, Hertfordshire and East Anglia, and when William de Redvers, 5th Earl of Devon died he was given the castle of Plympton.

He had made many enemies due to his actions during the war; numbered among them were William Marshal, who pawned four manors to him during the war and had difficulty getting them back, and the Earl of Salisbury, who grew to dislike him after de Bréauté supported Nicola de la Haie for constable of Lincoln Castle against Salisbury's personal preference. Due to his status as a commoner his position was more tenuous than that of his enemies, as he had no lands to base himself on, and relied increasingly on the favour of noblemen such as the Earl of Chester and Peter des Roches, Bishop of Winchester, who supported him due to their disenchantment with the rule of Hubert de Burgh. In 1222 he cooperated with de Burgh to suppress a revolt by the citizens of London, capturing three of the ringleaders and executing them without trial.

== Rebellion ==
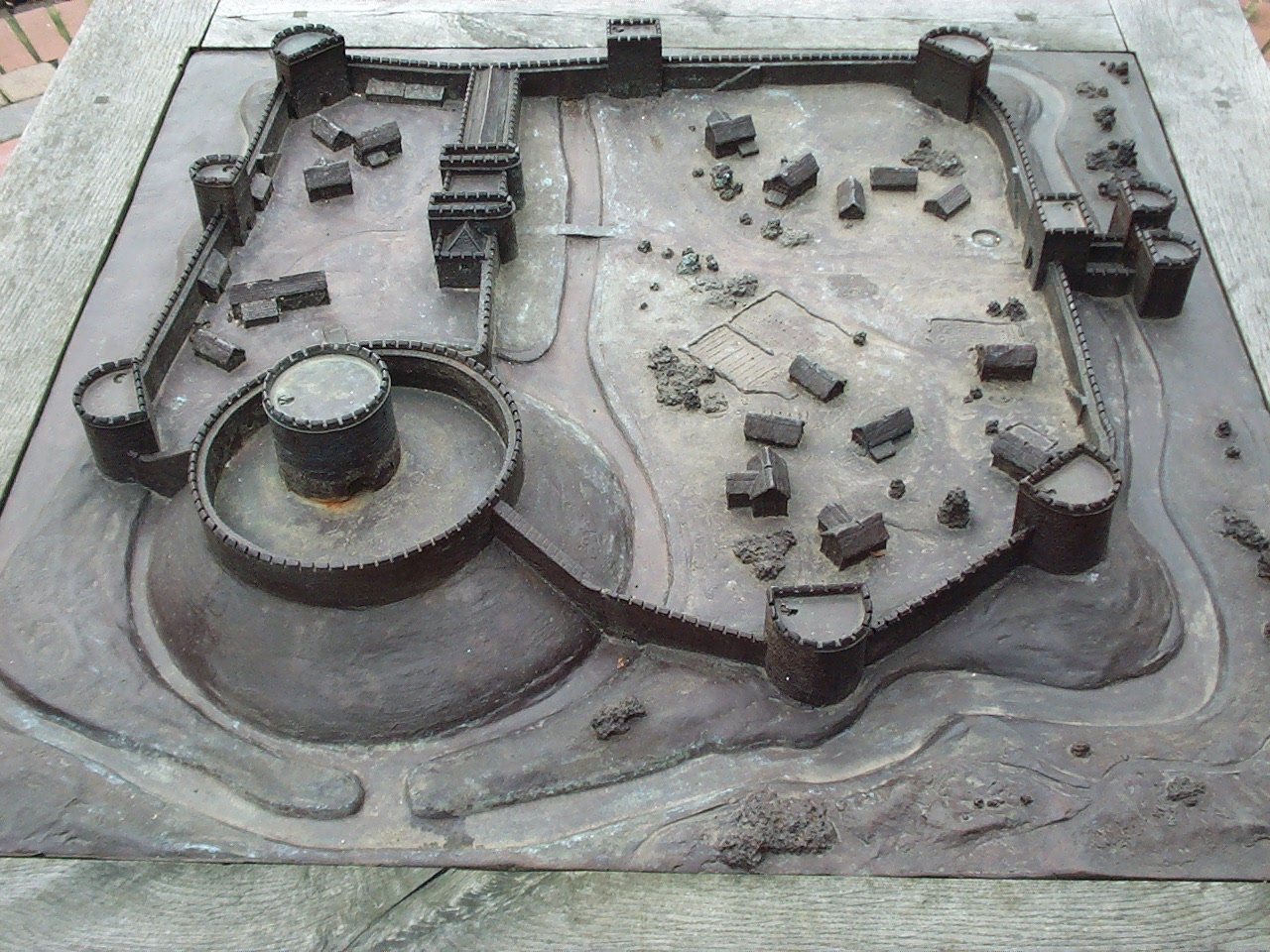
Model of how Bedford Castle may have looked. The River Great Ouse is on the left. The model predates archaeological excavations in 2007–8, which revealed the outlines of some of the main structures in the inner bailey (on the left here), including the great hall. The position of the main gate is unclear.

De Burgh's growing ascendancy drew de Bréauté and his allies even closer together, but tensions boiled over in November 1223, when de Burgh and the king were forced to flee to Northampton while de Bréauté, the Count of Aumale and the earls of Chester and Hertford attempted to seize the Tower of London. A new civil war was averted by the intervention of Simon Langton, Archbishop of York, but after a parley in London on 4 December failed tensions rose again. Threatened with excommunication the "schismatics" returned to the king's court, agreeing on 30 December to give their castles and shrievalties to the king. De Bréauté immediately lost Hertford Castle and the shrievalties of Oxfordshire and Northamptonshire, and lost the rest of his shrievalties by 18 January 1224.

The failure of de Bréauté and his allies gave the advantage to de Burgh, who in February 1224 ordered de Bréauté to give up Plympton and Bedford castles, rejecting his claim that Plympton Castle was part of his wife's inheritance. De Bréauté refused to give the castles up, and in response the royal court sent justices to his land with a fake charge of Breach of the Peace. They found him guilty of 16 counts of Wrongful Disseisin, and on 16 June William de Bréauté, Falkes' brother, seized Henry of Braybrooke, one of the justices of Dunstable, who ruled against de Bréautés in 16 suits under the new royal writs. Braybrooke had made himself a personal enemy of both de Bréautés. This was foolish in the extreme, as the King and his court were barely 20 miles away discussing the defence of Poitou. On 20 June 1224 the king and his forces besieged Bedford Castle, with Simon Langton excommunicating both the brothers and the garrison as a whole. The siege lasted eight weeks, with over 200 killed by missiles sent by castle defenders. After a fourth assault broke the walls William and 80 knights were captured, refused pardon and hanged.

== Exile ==
Having lost Bedford and his brother, Falkes submitted to Henry III on 19 August 1224, pleading for forgiveness in exchange for the loss of all his possessions. At his disgrace, his wife left him and pleaded for divorce, claiming she had been forced into the marriage eight years before; she was unsuccessful, but did manage to recover some of her lands. On 25 August Falkes officially gave up his lands, and chose exile to France rather than judgement from the barons. Arriving in Normandy he was imprisoned by Louis VIII in Compiègne as revenge for his defeat of the French forces during the war, but was released in 1225 either through the intervention of the pope or through his Crusader's Badge, assumed in 1221. After release he spent several months in Rome, and published a fourteen-page defence of his actions, the querimonia, which laid the blame at the feet of Langton and de Burgh, and begged the pope to support him as a man excommunicated without cause and as a crusader. Departing for England, de Bréauté was captured in Burgundy by an English knight he had once imprisoned, but papal intervention yet again saw his release. After this he lived in Troyes, but was expelled from France in 1226 for refusing to pay homage to the king, and again stayed in Rome, dying slightly before 18 July 1226, allegedly from a poisoned fish.

== Vauxhall ==
The part of London beside the Thames near the present Vauxhall Bridge known as Vauxhall seems originally to have been part of the extensive Manor of South Lambeth, which was held in the 13th century by the de Redvers family. The name Vauxhall (Fauxhall) is derived from Falkes de Bréauté, the second husband of Margaret, widow of Baldwin de Redvers.

In 1857 the Vauxhall Ironworks were founded in the Vauxhall area of south London as a steam pump and marine engine manufacturer. The company built the first Vauxhall car in 1903. In 1905, seeking to build a dedicated factory for car manufacture on cheaper land with room for expansion, the firm relocated to a new site in Luton, Bedfordshire. By pure coincidence de Bréauté also held the manor of Luton between 1216 and 1226, with the Vauxhall company relocating from his London seat to his country seat. The griffin of the de Bréauté coat of arms was in use in both Vauxhall and Luton between the 13th and 20th centuries. The firm was renamed Vauxhall Motors in 1907 and still uses the griffin as its badge. The house stood on approximately 31 acres (13 ha) in the royal manor of Kennington; it was the centre of tension between the Archbishop at Lambeth Palace and the monks of Canterbury, who tried to influence the election of English bishops.

Political offices
Preceded by Ralph Hareng	High Sheriff of Bedfordshire and Buckinghamshire; 1217–1224	Succeeded by Walter of Pattishall
Preceded by Henry of Braybrooke	High Sheriff of Northamptonshire; 1215–1223	Succeeded by Unknown
Preceded by Henry of Braybrooke	High Sheriff of Rutland; 1215–1224	Succeeded by Unknown
Preceded by Unknown	High Sheriff of Cambridgeshire; 1215–1224	Succeeded by Unknown
Preceded by Unknown	High Sheriff of Oxfordshire; 1215–1224	Succeeded by Unknown
