= William de Beauchamp (died 1260) =

British judge and high sheriff

High Sheriff of Bedfordshire and Buckinghamshire
- In office 1236–1237

Personal details
- Born: c. 1186
- Died: 1260 (aged 73–74)
- Spouse: Ida Longespee
- Children: 6

William de Beauchamp (c.1186–1260) was a British judge and high sheriff.

== Early life ==
William was the son of Simon de Beauchamp and his wife Isabel.

== Joins Barons' War ==
William took part in the 1210 expedition to Ireland and the 1214 expedition to Poitiers. He joined the rebellious barons in 1215 at the beginning of the First Barons' War, entertaining them at his seat of Bedford Castle; as such, de Beauchamp was one of the rebels excommunicated by Pope Innocent III. William was captured at the Battle of Lincoln on 20 May 1217 but made his peace with Henry III's regency government. By this point he had already lost Bedford Castle to Falkes de Breauté in 1215, leading to an odd situation: Breauté was granted the castle, while William held the barony. When Breauté fell from power Bedford Castle was besieged and partially destroyed on royal orders, but William was granted licence to build a residence within its Bailey. He was part of a royal expedition ambushed by Richard Marshal in 1233, and was appointed a Baron of the Exchequer in 1234 and 1237.

== Other offices ==
William also served as Sheriff of Buckinghamshire and Bedfordshire for 1236, and when Eleanor of Provence was crowned queen that year he served as an almoner.

== Family and death ==
William married firstly, Gunnor Lanvaley. She died before 1220. William married secondly, Ida Longespee, daughter of William Longespée, 3rd Earl of Salisbury and Ela, Countess of Salisbury.

William died in 1260, leaving a son, William, as well as five other children.

== Sources ==
- Faulkner, Kathryn (2004). "Beauchamp, de, family (per. c. 1080–c. 1265)". Oxford Dictionary of National Biography (online ed.). Oxford University Press. doi:10.1093/ref:odnb/54497. (Subscription or UK public library membership required.)
- Ingram, Mike (2014). "King John's scythe: Falkes de Bréauté and the Baron's Wars". Medieval Warfare. 4 (2:Theme - Queens and Valkyries - Women as warriors): 49–54.
- Johnstone, Hilda (1929). "Poor-Relief in the Royal Households of Thirteenth-Century England". Speculum. 4 (2 (Apr.)): 149–167.
- Mason, Emma (2004). "Beauchamp, William de". Oxford Dictionary of National Biography (online ed.). Oxford University Press. doi:10.1093/ref:odnb/1844. (Subscription or UK public library membership required.)
- Mills, M. H. (1927). "The Reforms at the Exchequer (1232-1242)". Transactions of the Royal Historical Society. 10. Cambridge University Press: 111–133.
- Valente, Claire (2003). The Theory and Practice of Revolt in Medieval England. Routledge.

Political offices
Preceded by Ralph Fitz Reginald	High Sheriff of Bedfordshire and Buckinghamshire; 1236–1237	Succeeded by Reginald de Whitchurch
