= Stogursey Castle =

Castle in Stogursey, Somerset, England

- Somerset, England
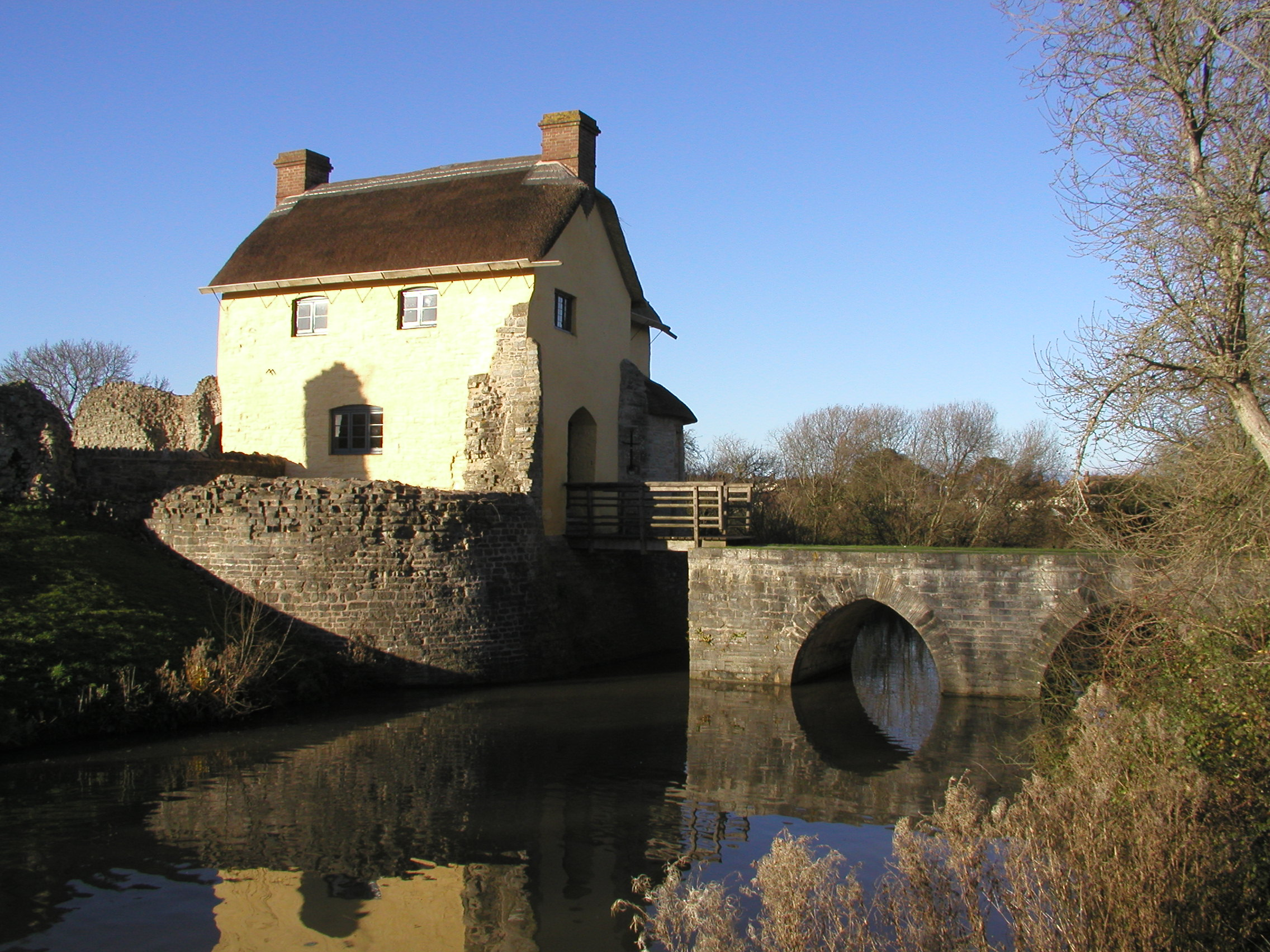
- The castle gatehouse

Site information
- Type: Motte-and-bailey
- Owner: Landmark Trust
- Open to the public: For holiday let

Location
- Shown within Somerset
- Coordinates: 51.1761°N 3.1429°W
- Grid reference: grid reference ST202425

Site history
- Materials: Stone

Stogursey Castle is a medieval castle in Somerset, England. Most of the site is in ruins, but there is a thatched gatehouse used for holiday rental by the Landmark Trust.

== History ==
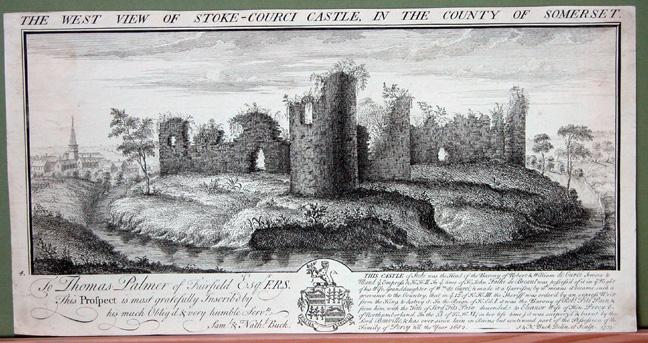
Engraving of Stogursey Castle in 1733 by Samuel and Nathaniel Buck

Stogursey Castle was built to the south of the village of Stogursey by the family of the De Courcys, probably in the late 11th or early 12th century. The name Stogursey is a corruption of Stoke Courcy. The castle was a motte-and-bailey design with a 60-metre-wide, two-metre-tall motte and two bailey enclosures, surrounded by a water-filled moat, fed from the nearby Stogursey Brook.

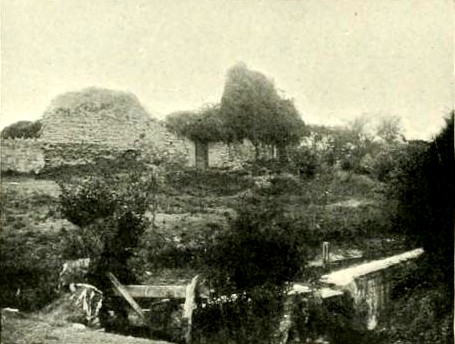
A 19th-century photograph of Stogursey Castle before its restoration

The castle was controlled by King John of England during the First Barons' War, and was ordered to be destroyed in 1215, but survived; John's lieutenant, Falkes de Bréauté, took control of the castle, and after his death, a second order to destroy the property was given in 1228, again apparently ignored. The castle was extended in stone in 1300 by the Fitzpayne family. It was destroyed in the 1450s by the Yorkist faction during the War of the Roses, though the Victoria County History notes that "there is no evidence, either documentary or archaeological, to support the claim for its destruction in 1457." A house was built within the castle grounds in the 17th century and restored in the 1870s, but by the late 20th century, it had been ruined until restoration by the Landmark Trust.

Storgursey Castle is a scheduled monument, and its gatehouse is a Grade II* listed building restored by the Landmark Trust between 1981 and 1982 for use as a holiday let.

== See also ==
- Castles in Great Britain and Ireland
- List of castles in England

== Bibliography ==
- [Video Tour https://www.youtube.com/watch?v=NiZSbdbjWT4]
- Landmark Trust. (2006) The Landmark Trust Handbook. Maidenhead, UK: The Landmark Trust. ISBN 978-0-9533124-5-0.
- Pettifer, Adrian. (2002) English Castles: a Guide by Counties. Woodbridge, UK: Boydell Press. ISBN 978-0-85115-782-5.
