= Serlo de Burci =

Norman feudal baron

Serlo de Burci was a Norman feudal baron and major landowner in south-west England, after the Norman conquest of England. His barony's caput, the manor of Blagdon, was in Somerset.

He is thought to have originated in Burcy, Calvados.

== Family ==
Serlo's daughter and heiress Geva married twice, her second husband being William de Falaise. Robert FitzMartin was her son by her first marriage to Martin de Turribus. His other daughter was sent to Shaftesbury Abbey to which the abbey received the endowment of the village of Kilmington, Devon.

== Sources ==
- Cooke, Katherine (1990). "Donors and Daughters: Shafteburys Abbey's Benefactors, Endowments and Nuns, c.1086–1130". In Chibnall, Marjorie (ed.). Anglo-Norman Studies. Vol. XII: Proceedings of the Battle Conference 1989. The Boydell Press. ISBN 978-0-85115-257-8.
- Sanders, I. J. (1960). English Baronies: A Study of Their Origin and Descent, 1086–1327. Clarendon Press.
