= Stogursey =

Village and civil parish in Somerset, England

Coordinates: 51.1807°N 3.1413°W

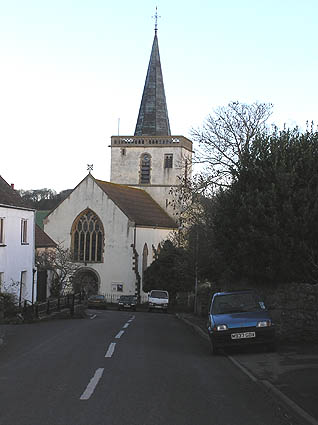
- Church of St Andrew

- Location within Somerset
- Population: 1,385 (2011)
- OS grid reference: ST203430
- Unitary authority: Somerset West and Taunton
- Ceremonial county: Somerset
- Region: South West
- Country: England
- Sovereign state: United Kingdom
- Post town: Bridgwater
- Postcode district: TA5
- Dialling code: 01278
- Police: Avon and Somerset
- Fire: Devon and Somerset
- Ambulance: South Western
- UK Parliament: Tiverton and Minehead

Stogursey is a small village and civil parish in the Quantock Hills in Somerset, England. It is situated 3 miles (4.8 km) from Nether Stowey, and 8 miles (12.9 km) west of Bridgwater. The village is situated near the Bristol Channel, which bounds the parish on the north.

The parish includes the village of Stolford, which is believed to mean 'The stile ford' from the Old English stigol and ford, and the hamlets of Burton, Knighton, Shurton, Stoford, Week, and Fairfield.

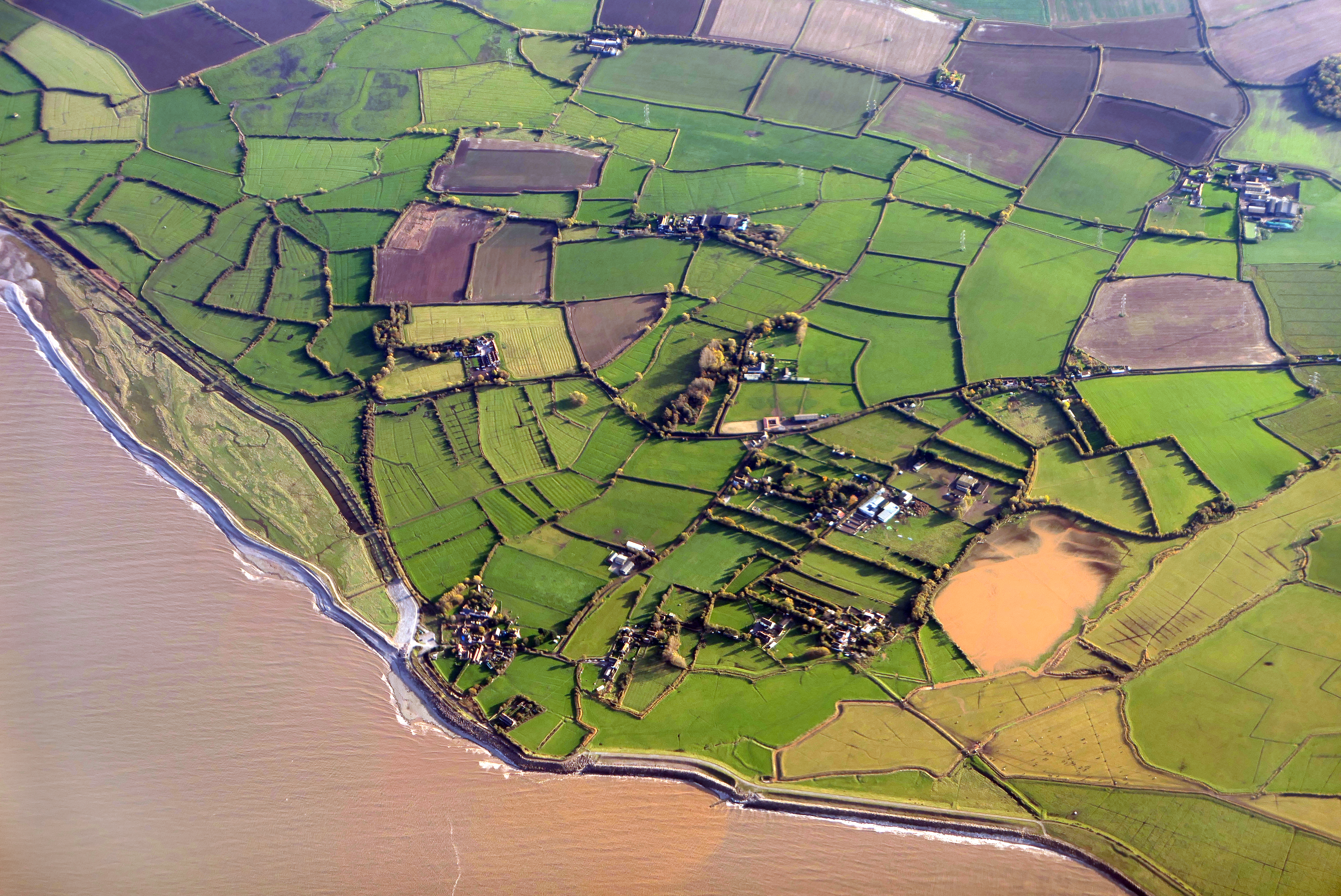
Aerial view of Stolford, in the parish of Stogursey.

== History ==
On the beach near Stogursey are the remains of a submerged forest dated to 2500 B.C.

A Romano-British coin hoard was discovered in 1999. It contained 1,097 base silver radiates, the remains of a pottery vessel and 50 copper alloy coins.

It takes its name from the manor of Stoke. Medieval Stoche was in the possession of William de Falaise by 1086, who had recently married Geva, daughter of Serlo de Burci, and widow of Martin "de Wallis". Early in the 12th century, William and Geva's daughter, Emma, was betrothed to William de Courcy, and the couple received the manor of Stoke upon their wedding. The manor was renamed Stoke Courcy, and is now known as Stogursey. Stogursey Castle was probably built in the 12th century.

The best-known member of the family was John de Courcy, who made himself virtual Prince of Ulster after conquering it in 1177. He died about 1219, his descendants (all illegitimate) today being the Baron Kingsale of Ireland.

During the reign of King John of England (1199–1216) it became the property of one of his favourites and closest advisors, Fulke de Breauté of Gascony. Fulke's sister, Avice de Breauté, was mother of Sir Nicholas FitzMartin (c. 1210–82), who, like the de Courcys, was a descendant of Geva de Burci, the wife of William de Falaise, via her son Robert FitzMartin. Said to be tyrannical, Fulke made the castle and village a stronghold and den of robbers; he was eventually expelled in the reign of Henry III, and is said to have died in poverty in Normandy after 1224.

Part of a curtain wall from the castle remains incorporated into a cottage. It is a Grade II* listed building and Scheduled Ancient Monument.

The remains of a Ham stone village cross on the High Street is from the Middle Ages. Approximately 1 metre (3 ft 3 in) of the original shaft is still in the socket stone.

In the Middle Ages Stogursey was an important place. It became a borough by 1225, and retained that status until at least 1833. Stogursey was part of the hundred of Cannington.

The ancient parish of Stogursey was large. It included the north foreshore of the Steart Peninsula, including Stert Island which broke from the mainland in about 1798. In 1885 Stert Island was transferred to the parish of Huntspill, and in 1933 the north side of the Steart Peninsula was transferred to the parish of Otterhampton.

Wick Barrow, near Stogursey, is associated with pixies. It is said that a ploughman working nearby once mended a pixie's broken peel (a wooden blade used for moving hot food), and the pixie kindly baked a cake to reward him.

== Governance ==
The parish council has responsibility for local issues, including setting an annual precept (local rate) to cover the council's operating costs and producing annual accounts for public scrutiny. The parish council evaluates local planning applications and works with the local police, district council officers, and neighbourhood watch groups on matters of crime, security, and traffic. The parish council's role also includes initiating projects for the maintenance and repair of parish facilities, as well as consulting with the district council on the maintenance, repair, and improvement of highways, drainage, footpaths, public transport, and street cleaning. Conservation matters (including trees and listed buildings) and environmental issues are also the responsibility of the council.

For local government purposes, since 1 April 2023, the parish comes under the unitary authority of Somerset Council. Prior to this, it was part of the non-metropolitan district of Somerset West and Taunton (formed on 1 April 2019) and, before this, the district of West Somerset (established under the Local Government Act 1972). It was part of before 1974.

The appropriate electoral ward is called 'Quantock Vale'. The ward stretches along the Bristol Channel from Kilve via Stogursey to Stolford. The total ward population at the 2011 Census is 2,121.

It is also part of the Tiverton and Minehead county constituency represented in the House of Commons of the Parliament of the United Kingdom. It elects one Member of Parliament (MP) by the first past the post system of election.

== Religious sites ==
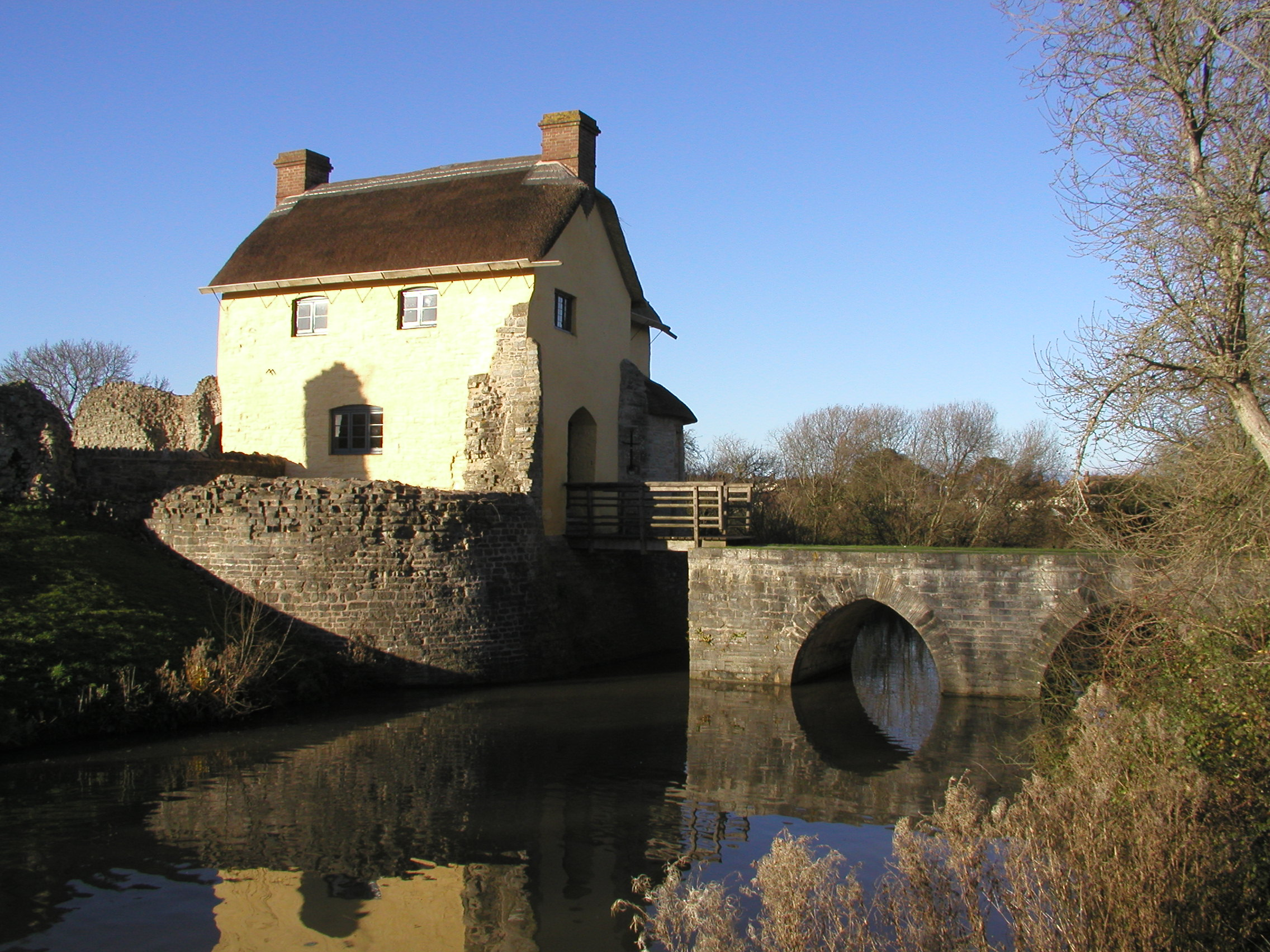
Stogursey Castle gatehouse

Within the village, at the bottom of the street, stands the church of St Andrew, built early in the 12th century by William de Falaise, though believed to incorporate earlier features. However, some of this may be due to the workers being English, not Norman; and the fact that in the 1940s Reverend Basil Tucker removed much of the Victorian era work, giving the church its original, sparse yet pleasing shape.

Less than a quarter of a mile to the south are the restored remains of Stogursey Castle.

A priory in the village was built by the Falaise family. To preserve the family's association with Normandy the priory was donated as a cell to the Benedictine Abbey of St Mary at Lonlay. This dwindled over the years, and when all alien priories were appropriated by the crown in the 15th century, Henry VI presented the endowments of Stogursey to "the College of the Blessed Mary of Eton beside Windsor" (Eton College), which he had founded a few years earlier.

== Notable residents ==
In 1863 Neville Howse was born in the village. He went on to join the Australian army and was the first Australian to be awarded the Victoria Cross.

Haile Selassie, the emperor of Abyssinia, visited Stogursey in 1938.

== Twin towns – sister cities ==
Stogursey is twinned with:

- Lonlay-l'Abbaye, France (since 1985)
