= John de Courcy =

Anglo-Norman knight (1150–1219)

- Lord of Ulster
- De Courcy coat of arms
- Born: c. 1150; Kent, England
- Died: September 1219; Armagh, Ireland
- Spouse: Affrica Guðrøðardóttir
- Father: William de Courcy II
- Mother: Avice de Rumelly
- Occupation: Knight

Sir John de Courcy (c. 1150–1219) was an Anglo-Norman knight who lived in Ireland from 1176 until his expulsion in 1204. He conquered a considerable territory, endowed religious establishments, built abbeys for both the Benedictines and the Cistercians and built strongholds at Dundrum Castle in County Down and Carrickfergus Castle in County Antrim.

== Early career in Ireland ==
Belonging to a family which took its name from Courcy (Normandy), John de Courcy came to Ireland around the year 1171 as part of the Norman invading forces, brought in as mercenaries working for Diarmaid Mac Murchadha, the ousted king of Leinster, to help him regain his position as king.

De Courcy's exact parentage is unknown. The man thought to be his great-grandfather, Richard de Courcy, is named in the Domesday Book. De Courcy's grandfather, William de Courcy I, married Emma de Falaise. His father, William de Courcy II, married Avice de Rumilly and died before 1130, leaving the family estates in Somerset and elsewhere in England to his son, William de Courcy III, John's possible brother.

John was very ambitious and wanted lands for himself. He decided to invade the north of Ireland which was controlled by Irish dynasties. In early January 1177, he assembled a small army of 22 knights and 300 foot-soldiers and marched north, at the rate of thirty miles a day. They skirted the back of the Mourne Mountains and took the town of Dún Dá Leathghlas (now Downpatrick) by surprise. After two fierce battles, in February and June 1177, de Courcy defeated the last King of Ulaid, Ruaidhrí Mac Duinnshléibhe. He did all of this without King Henry II's permission.

After conquering eastern Ulster, he established his seat at Carrickfergus, where he built an impressive stone castle. Other monasteries and castles that he built are Inch Abbey and Dundrum. He married Affrica, daughter of Godred II Olafsson, King of Mann. It is likely that the marriage, as in the case of many kings and those aspiring to be kings in those days, was political, to seal an alliance with her father who paid homage to the King of Norway. John and Affreca are not recorded to have had any children. Affreca built a monastery at Greyabbey dedicated to Saint Mary of The Yoke of God. She is buried there and her effigy, in stone, can still be seen.

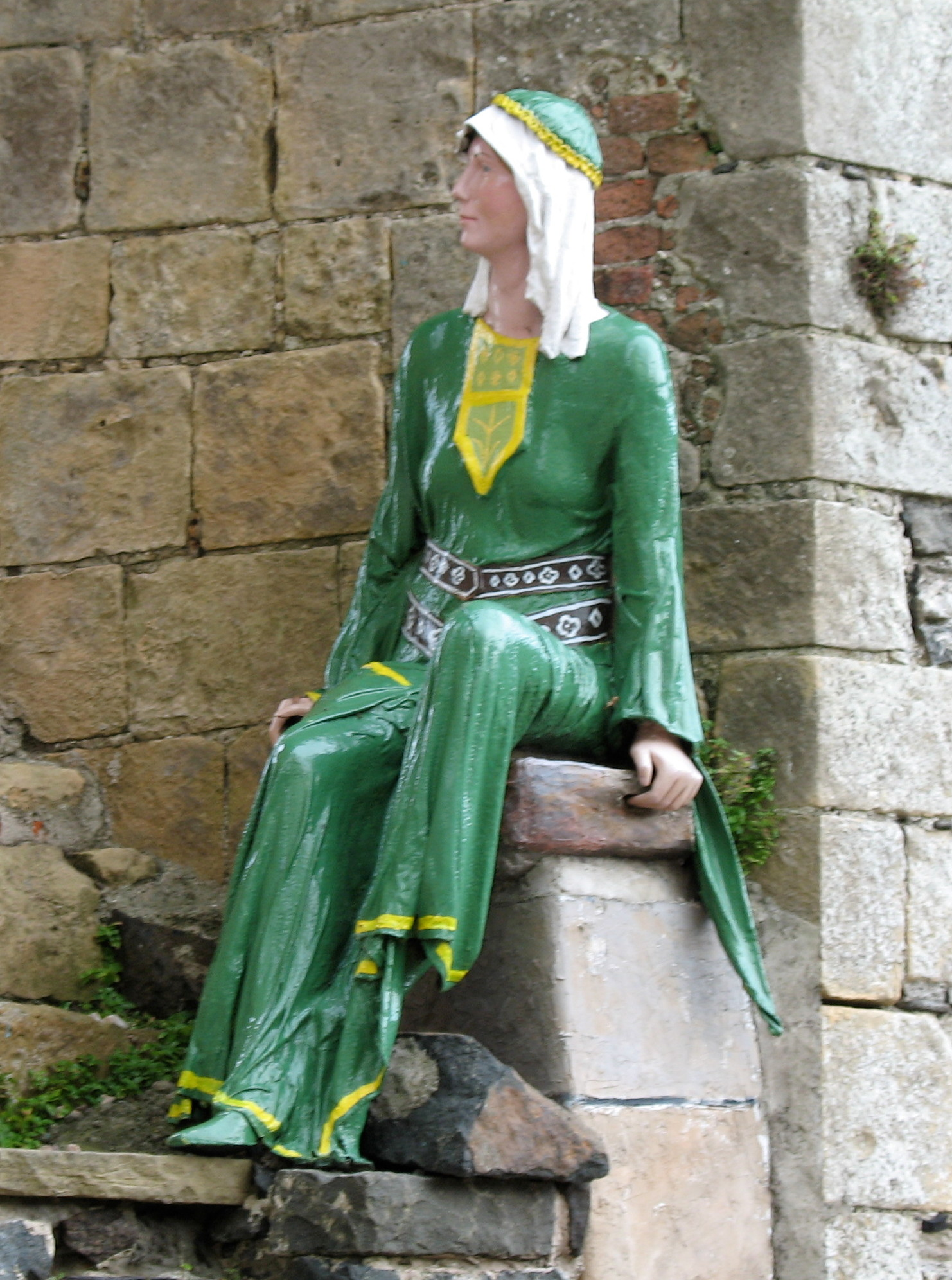
Statue representing Affrica Guðrøðardóttir, Princess of the Isles

In 1183, de Courcy provided for the establishment of a priory at the cathedral of Down with generous endowments to the Benedictines from Chester in England (free from all subjugation to Chester Cathedral). This building was destroyed by an earthquake in 1245. He also created a cell for Benedictines at St. Andrews in the Ards (Black Abbey) for the houses of Stoke Courcy in Somerset and Lonlay in France, which was near Inishargy, Kircubbin, in present-day County Down. The early Irish monastery of Nendrum was given to the Benedictine house of St Bees in Cumberland in order that they might also establish a cell. His wife, Affreca, founded the Cistercian monastery of Grey Abbey, County Down, as a daughter house of Holm Cultram (Cumberland) in 1193.

He also made incursions into the west to increase his territory and lordship. In 1188 he invaded Connacht, but was repulsed and the next year he plundered Armagh.

== Later career in Ireland ==
After the accession of Richard I in 1189, de Courcy in conjunction with William de Lacy appears in some way to have offended the king by his proceedings in Ireland. De Lacy quickly made his peace with Richard, while de Courcy defied him, and the subsequent history of the latter consisted mainly in the vicissitudes of a lasting feud with the de Lacys. Hugh de Lacy, younger son of Hugh de Lacy Lord of Meath, began to wage war on John de Courcy, capturing him in 1204. An account of his capture appears in the Book of Howth. This passage helps explain why John had a reputation as a strong, God-fearing warrior:

Sir Hugh de Lacy was commanded to do what he might to apprehend and take Sir John de Courcy, and so devised and conferred with certain of Sir John's own men, how this might be done; and they said it were not possible to take him, since he lived ever in his armour, unless it were a Good Friday and they told that his custom was that on that day he would wear no shield, harness nor weapon, but would be in the church, kneeling at his prayers, after he had gone about the church five times bare-footed. And so they came at him upon the sudden, and he had no shift to make but with the cross pole, and defended himself until it was broken and slew thirteen of them before he was taken.

In May 1205, King John made Hugh Earl of Ulster, granting him all the land of the province "as John de Courcy held it on the day when Hugh defeated him". John de Courcy returned, sailing across the Irish sea from the Isle of Man in July 1205 with Norse soldiers and a hundred boats supplied by his brother-in-law, Ragnold, King of Mann. John and his army landed at Strangford and laid siege to Dundrum Castle in vain because the defences he himself had made were too strong.

== Holy Land and death ==
King John then had John de Courcy imprisoned and spent the rest of his life in poverty. He was subsequently released when he "crossed himself" to go on a pilgrimage to Jerusalem. After returning from the Holy Land, De Courcy died in obscurity near present-day Craigavon.

== Literary references ==
The story of John de Courcy's defeat of the French champion, and his winning the privilege to remain covered in the presence of the King, appears in Chapter 12 of Mark Twain's The Prince and the Pauper.

In his book Saint Patrick's Town, Anthony M. Wilson said about John de Courcy:

Giraldus, a contemporary, names John de Courcy as one of the four great men, a hero of his time. Goddard Orpen, the respected historian of the Norman invasion of Ireland, clearly admired this remarkable man who first established a power base in Ulster and then dominated the whole country. His conspicuous place in Irish history is secure. The people of modern Ulster can look back to him as a counterpart of William the Conqueror in England, the man who brought Ulster, albeit by force, into the mainstream of European law, religion and culture. By the inhabitants of Downpatrick he must be regarded and honoured as the founder of their town. He came as an alien Englishman, a foreign invader and, by that process so often effective in the very air of Ireland, he was converted into a true Irishman. He personally fostered and promoted the fame and honour of Saint Patrick and linked the name of the town and Abbey to the name of the patron saint. As well as the Benedictine Abbey on the hill, he founded three other monasteries close to the town and he created on the hills of Down a city, both monastic and mercantile, of which both the mediaeval and the twentieth century citizens can be proud.

== Family tree I ==
    ________________________________________
    |                                     |
    |                                     | 
    Baudri the German Vigor
   =niece of Godfrey (?) of Brionn
    |
    |________________________________________________________________________________________________
    |               |         |            |            |            |           |               |  |
    |               |         |            |            |            |           |               |  |
    Nicholas Fulk Robert Richard Baudri Vigor Elizabeth daughters
de Bacqueville de Alnou de Courcy of Neville of Bocquence of Apulia  =Fulk of Bonneval
   issue        issue     =Hebrea      issue        issue
                              |
                              |
                           Richard
                          =Wandelmode
                              |
    __________________________|
    |              |          |
    |              |          |
    Robert Richard William, died c. 1130. 
   =Rohesia de Grandesmil   =Emma de Falise
    |                         |
    |                         |
  William Robert, died c. 1151.
    |                         |
de Courcy                   de Courcy
of France           of England and Ireland

== Family tree II ==
          Serlo de Burci Corbutonis de Falise
           =?                     =Ameline
            |                      | 
            |                      |_________________________________________
            |                      |               |          |           |
            |                      |               |          |           |
   Martin = Geva de Burci = William de Falise Roger Gaufridus Galterus
          |               |
          |               |_____________________________
          |               |                            |
          |               |                            |
 Robert fitz Martin Emma = William de Courcy Sibil = Baldwin de Bullers
                               |
    ___________________________|______________
    |                          |            |
    |                          |            |
    William, died c. 1151.     Robert Jordan
  =Avice de Rumelly                        =?
    |                                       |
    |____________________                   |___________
    |           |      |                    |          |
    |           |      |                    |          |
    William Robert Richard              John     Jordan
                                            |
                                            |
                                      Baron Kingsale

Derived from Flanders 2009, pp. 177, 178, 180, 181.

== Sources ==
- DeBreffny, Brian; Mott, George (1976). The Churches and Abbeys of Ireland. London: Thames & Hudson. pp. 60–61.
- DeBreffny, Brian (1977). Castles of Ireland. London: Thames & Hudson.
- Duffy, Seán (2004). "Courcy, John de". Oxford Dictionary of National Biography. Oxford University Press.
- Flanders, Steve (2009). De Courcy: Anglo-Normans in Ireland, England and France in the eleventh and twelfth centuries. Four Courts Press. ISBN 978-1-84682-094-6.
- Mac Annaidh, Séamus, ed. (2001). Illustrated Dictionary of Irish History. Dublin: Gill and Macmillan. ISBN 0717135365.
- O'Laverty, James (1887). An Historical Account of the Diocese of Down and Connor. Duffy & Sons.
