= William de Falaise =

Norman feudal baron

William de Falaise (11th century), also called William of Falaise, was a Norman from Falaise, Duchy of Normandy, today in the Calvados department in the Lower Normandy region of north-western France. He became feudal baron of Stogursey in Somerset and also held manors in Devon.

== Biography ==
William married Geva de Burci (her second husband), who was the daughter and sole heiress of Serlo de Burcy, feudal baron of Blagdon, Somerset, which barony is sometimes stated to be of Dartington, Devon, as the caput cannot be clearly assigned exclusively to either place. Her dowry consisted of Somerset Manor of Woodspring.

Geva's first husband was "Martin" (died before 1086) for whom she produced a son and heir, Robert fitz Martin (died 1159), who with his descendants were feudal barons of Blagdon.

William's daughter and sole heiress to the feudal barony of Stogursey was Emma of Falaise, who married William de Courcy (died about 1114), to whose descendants the barony of Stogursey passed.

The Devon lands of William of Falaise however passed to the FitzMartin family, feudal barons of Blagdon, who were sometimes seated at his former manor of Dartington.

== Landholdings ==
The Exeter Domesday Book lists him as holding the following 17 Devon manors as a tenant-in-chief of the king:

- Combe Martin, in Braunton Hundred
- Furse, possibly Furze in West Buckland in Braunton Hundred
- Parracombe, in Shirwell Hundred
- Churchill, in East Down parish, Braunton Hundred
- "Beare", possibly a lost Beare in Worlington, Witheridge Hundred
- Washford Pyne in Witheridge Hundred
- Worlington, in Witheridge Hundred
- Bradford, in Witheridge Hundred
- Densham, in Woolfardisworthy parish
- Cockington, in Haytor Hundred
- Holne, now a parish, in Stanborough Hundred
- Stoke, in Holne parish, in Stanborough Hundred
- Dean Prior, a parish in Stanborough Hundred
- Rattery, a parish in Stanborough Hundred
- Dartington, a parish in Stanborough Hundred
- Harbourneford, in South Brent parish in Stanborough Hundred
- Englebourne, now in Harberton parish, Coleridge Hundred.

He is listed as Wilts de Faleise, holding 3 Somerset manors as tenant-in-chief:

- Stogursey, in Cannington Hundred
- Wootton [Courtenay], in Carhampton Hundred
- Woodspring, in Winterstoke Hundred

== Sources ==
- Cooke, Katherine (1990). "Donors and Daughters: Shafteburys Abbey's Benefactors, Endowments and Nuns, c.1086–1130". In Chibnall, Marjorie (ed.). Anglo-Norman Studies. Vol. XII: Proceedings of the Battle Conference 1989. The Boydell Press. ISBN 978-0-85115-257-8.
- Keats-Rohan, K. S. B. (2002). Domesday Descendants: A Prosopography of Persons Occurring in English Documents, 1066–1166: Pipe Rolls to Cartae Baronum. Ipswich, UK: Boydell Press. ISBN 0-85115-863-3.
- Thorn, Caroline & Frank, Domesday Book, Vol. 9, Devon, vol. 1, Chichester, 1985, Chapter 20, holdings of William de Falaise.
- Sanders, Ivor J., 'Barony of Blagdon' in English Baronies (Oxford, 1960), p. 15,
