= William de Courcy (died c. 1114) =

11th and 12th-century Anglo-Norman nobleman and baron

William de Courcy (died c. 1114), feudal baron of Stoke Courcy (modern Stogursey) in Somerset, was an Anglo-Norman nobleman.

William was the son of Richard de Courcy by his wife Wandelmode. The family was from the Calvados region of Normandy. William inherited the English lands of his father in about 1088.

On the accession of King Henry I of England in 1100, William was appointed a royal steward, or dapifer. There were probably four stewards in the royal household, and Henry kept in office the three he inherited from his brother King William II, namely Eudo, Haimo and Roger Bigod, 1st Earl of Norfolk. William was the only new appointment to this office at the start of Henry's reign. In March 1101 William served as a surety for Henry fulfilling a treaty with Robert II, Count of Flanders. William pledged 100 marks as security that would have been forfeited should the king fail to uphold the treaty terms. In 1107 William witnessed a charter of the king in Normandy and 6 more royal charters during 1110 in England. While Henry was absent from England in 1111 William was one of the advisors of Queen Matilda, who was left behind in England to govern the country.

William gave a gift of land as well as the advowson of the church at Nuneham Courtenay in Oxfordshire to Abingdon Abbey, the advowson grant being related in the Historia Ecclesie Abbendonensis. Shortly after these grants, William further gave to Abingdon a fishery named "Sotiswere".

William married Emma de Falaise, the daughter and heiress of William de Falaise, feudal baron of Stoke (later "Stoke Curcy, Stogursey") in Somerset, who held amongst many others, the manor of Stogursey in Somerset, his caput, at the time of the Domesday Book in 1086. William inherited the lands of his wife and became thereby feudal baron of Stogursey. The honour of Stoke-Courcy represented 25 knight's fees. By his wife he had three sons: William de Courcy (died before 1130), eldest son and heir who inherited the feudal barony of Stogursey, Richard, and Robert de Courcy, who may have inherited his father's royal stewardship.
