= Sées =

- Commune
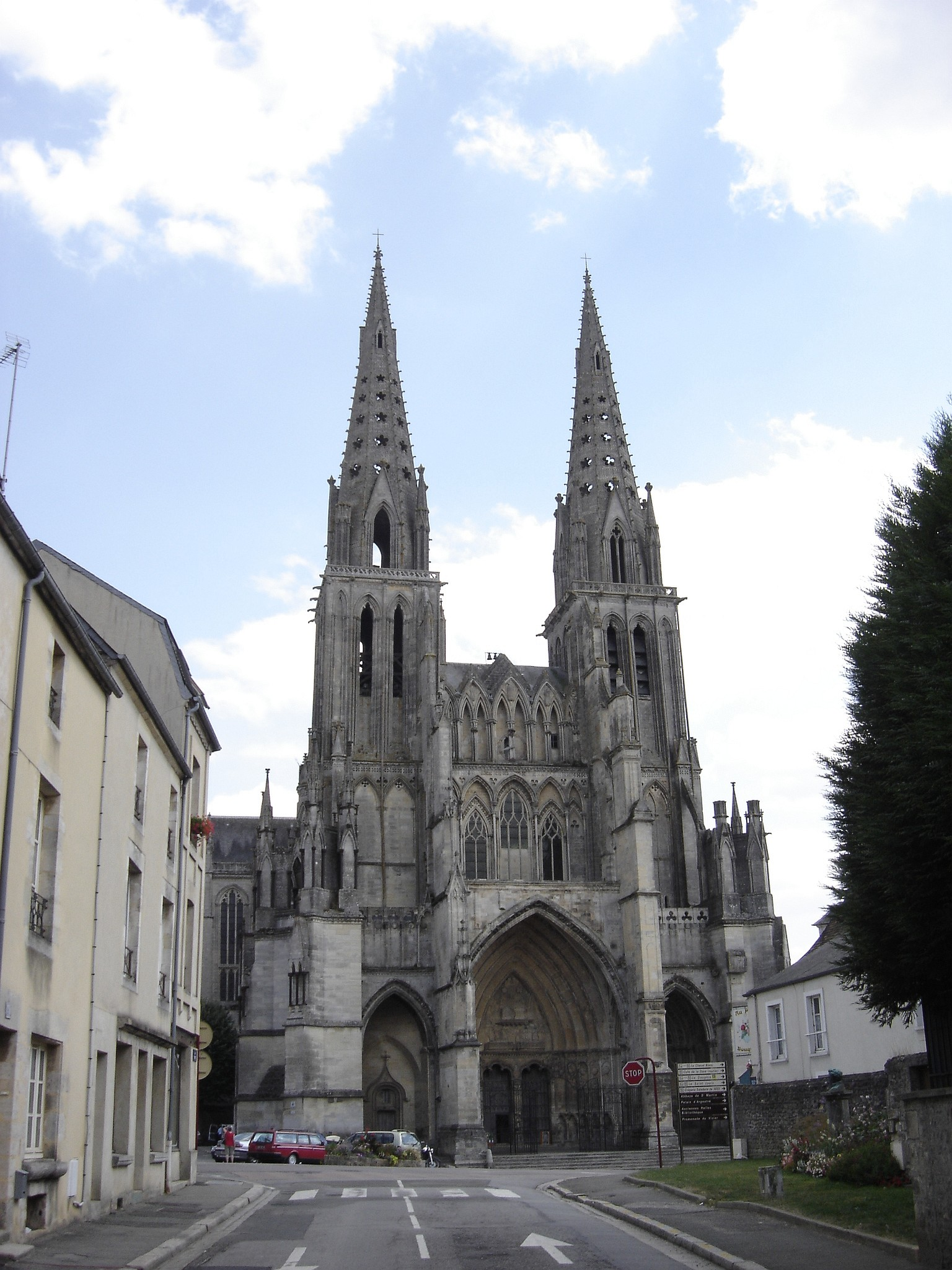
- Sées Cathedral

- Coat of arms
- Location of Sées
- Location within France Location within Normandy
- Coordinates: 48°36′19″N 0°10′19″E
- Country: France
- Region: Normandy
- Department: Orne
- Arrondissement: Alençon
- Canton: Sées
- Intercommunality: Sources de l'Orne

Government
  - Mayor (2020–2026): Mostefa Maachi
- Area^{1}: 40.31 km^{2} (15.56 sq mi)
- Elevation: 188 m (617 ft)
- Highest elevation: 321 m (1,053 ft)
- Lowest elevation: 170 m (560 ft)
- Population (2023): 4,168
  - Density: 103.4/km^{2} (267.8/sq mi)
- Time zone: UTC+01:00 (CET)
  - Summer (DST): UTC+02:00 (CEST)
- INSEE/Postal code: 61464 /61500
- ^{1} French Land Register data, which excludes lakes, ponds, glaciers > 1 km^{2} (0.386 sq mi or 247 acres) and river estuaries.

Sées (French pronunciation: [se]) is a commune in the Orne department in north-western France. It is classed as a Petite Cité de Caractère.

== Geography ==
The commune is spread over an area of 40.31 square kilometres (9,960 acres) with a maximum altitude of 321 metres (1,053 ft 2 in) and minimum of 170 metres (557 ft 9 in)

The commune is made up of the following collection of villages and hamlets, Échassey, Boisville, Le Buhot, Giberville, La Trotterie, Sées, Saint-Laurent, Fontaineriant, L'Ormel, Les Choux, La Parfaiterie, Leurey and Fouacé.

It lies on the river Orne 3 miles (5 km) from its source and 13 miles (20 km) north-by-northeast of Alençon. As well as the Orne, the Ruisseau de la Lavandiere is another watercourse that flows through the commune.

The commune is within the Normandie-Maine Regional Natural Park and Forêt d'Écouves.

Sées along with another 65 communes is part of a 20,593 hectare, Natura 2000 conservation area, called the Haute vallée de l'Orne et affluents.

=== Land distribution ===
The 2018 CORINE Land Cover assessment shows the vast majority of the land in the commune, 59% (495 hectares (1,220 acres)) is Arable land. The rest of the land is Meadows at 29%, Urbanised areas cover 5%, Industrial and commercial areas are 3% and the remaining 4% (178 hectares (440 acres)) is Forest.

== Name ==
The town's name derives from the Latin (civitas) Sagiensis "city of the Sagii", a Gaulish tribe that turned it into its capital city. The traditional spelling was Séez, which has been retained by the Church; the Diocese of Séez is headed by the Bishop of Séez. However, the spelling Sées was adopted for the town by the civil authorities following Napoleon's successful Italian campaign of 1796–7, one result of which was to bring another (Savoyan) Séez into France.

== History ==
The first bishop of Sées was St Lain, who lived about the fourth century. In the ninth century, Sées was a fortified town and fell prey to the Normans. At that period Sées had two distinct parts: the Orne: the bishop's borough to the north and the new count's borough (Bourg le Comte) to the south. The counts of Alençon took control in 1356. It was captured and recaptured in the wars between Henry II of England and his sons. In the Hundred Years' War it was one of the first towns of Normandy to fall into the hands of the English, in 1418. Pillaged by the Protestants during the Wars of Religion, Sées attached itself to the Catholic League in 1589, but voluntarily surrendered to Henry IV of France in 1590.

=== Heraldry ===
Arms of Sées	The arms of Sées are blazoned : Azure, in pale a fleur de lys Or, a heart argent enflamed Or, and 2 hands clasping argent.

== Population ==
Historical population
Year	Pop.	±% p.a.
1968	4,347	—
1975	4,706	+1.14%
1982	4,767	+0.18%
1990	4,547	−0.59%
1999	4,504	−0.11%
2007	4,582	+0.21%
2012	4,358	−1.00%
2017	4,179	−0.84%
2023	4,168	−0.04%
Source: INSEE

== Points of interest ==
=== Sées Cathedral ===
Sées Cathedral is a Gothic cathedral that is the episcopal see of the Diocese of Séez. The cathedral dates from the thirteenth and fourteenth centuries and occupies the site of three earlier churches. The west front, which is obscured by the buttresses flying from it, has two stately spires of open work 230 feet (70 m) high. The nave was built towards the end of the thirteenth century. The choir, built soon afterwards, is remarkable for the lightness of its construction. In the choir are four bas-reliefs of great beauty representing scenes in the life of the Virgin Mary; and the altar is adorned with another depicting the removal of the relics of St. Gervais and St. Protais. The church has been the object of frequent restoration and reconstruction. In 1875 it was declared a monument historique.

=== National heritage sites ===
In addition to the cathedral, Sées has nine other buildings and areas listed as a monument historique.

- Palais d'Argentré built in 1778 is the former Bishop's residence of the Diocese of Séez, it was listed as a monument in 1908.
- Notre-Dame-du-Vivier church is the remains of a former thirteenth-century church, that would have been the first place of worship in Sées. It was registered as a monument in 1975
- chapter house a former chapter house built in the fifteenth century, that was registered as a monument in 1972
- Saint-Martin Abbey a former abbey dating from the sixth century, by monks from the Abbey of Saint-Evroul. The abbey consists of twelfth- and seventeenth-century components, and was listed in 1968
- Canonical chapel a former chapel, just north of the cathedral, dating back to the thirteenth century and registered as a monument in 1939
- Butte Saint-Pierre castle mound a former eleventh-century fortification with a 40-metre diameter base it was registered as a monument in 1996
- Hotel of Count Curial a former sixteenth-century hotel and listed as a monument in 1937
- grain Market was built in the nineteenth century and listed in 1980
- Chapel of the Immaculate Conception built between 1854 and 1859, it was designed by Victor Ruprich-Robert. The church was registered as a monument in 2006.

=== Museums ===
- Musée départemental d'art religieux de Sées is a Museum of France dedicated to showcasing religious art. It was first opened in 1969 and is based in the old chapter of the cathedral, it houses over 2000 pieces.

=== Architecture contemporaine remarquable ===
- Chapelle de l’ancien Grand séminaire - The Chapel of the former Grand Seminary was built in 1940 by architect Besnard-Bernadac Félix. In 2003 the building was converted into a boarding school, and a year later the building was awarded with the label of Architecture contemporaine remarquable.

== Transport ==
Sées station has rail connections to Argentan, Le Mans and Flers.

== Notable people ==
- Latuinus – (died 440) – first bishop of Séez
- Landry of Sées – (died 480) – a French saint and bishop of Séez.
- Litardus – was a bishop of Sees from the first half of the sixth century.
- Adelin of Séez – (died 910) a bishop of Sees
- Sigefroi – eleventh-century bishop of Sees.
- Radbod of Seez – eleventh-century bishop of Sees.
- Ivo of Bellême (died c.1070) – bishop of Sees.
- Saint Osmund – (died 1099) a Norman noble and clergyman was born here.
- Robert d'Alençon (1344–1377), Count of Perche is buried here at the église abbatiale de Saint-Martin
- Marthe Cosnard – (1614–1659) a seventeenth-century French playwright was born here.
- Jacques Du Frische – (1640–1693) a French Benedictine theologian was born here
- Guillaume-André-Réné Baston – (1741–1825) a French theologian, who was bishop of Sees from 1813 to 1814.
- Charles de Bernard de Marigny (1740–1816) a French vice admiral, grand-cross of the ordre de Saint-Louis and commander of the Brest fleet was born here.
- Auguste-François Maunoury (1811–1898) a Catholic Hellenist and exegete died here.
- Charles Porset (1944–2011) a writer and historian was born here
- Jean-Claude Boulanger (born 1945) – was bishop of sees.

== Twin towns – sister cities ==
Sées is twinned with:

- Tönisvorst, Germany
- Staré Město, Czech Republic
- Southwell, England

== See also ==
- Communes of the Orne department
- Parc naturel régional Normandie-Maine
