= Seez =

Seez may refer to:

- Seez (river), a river in the canton of St. Gallen, Switzerland
- Sées, Orne, a town in north-western France, traditionally known as Séez
  - Roman Catholic Diocese of Séez, a diocese in Sées
- Séez, Savoie, France
