= Séez =

Séez may refer to:

- Séez, Savoie
- Sées, Orne

- Roman Catholic Diocese of Séez
