= Belfonds =

- Commune
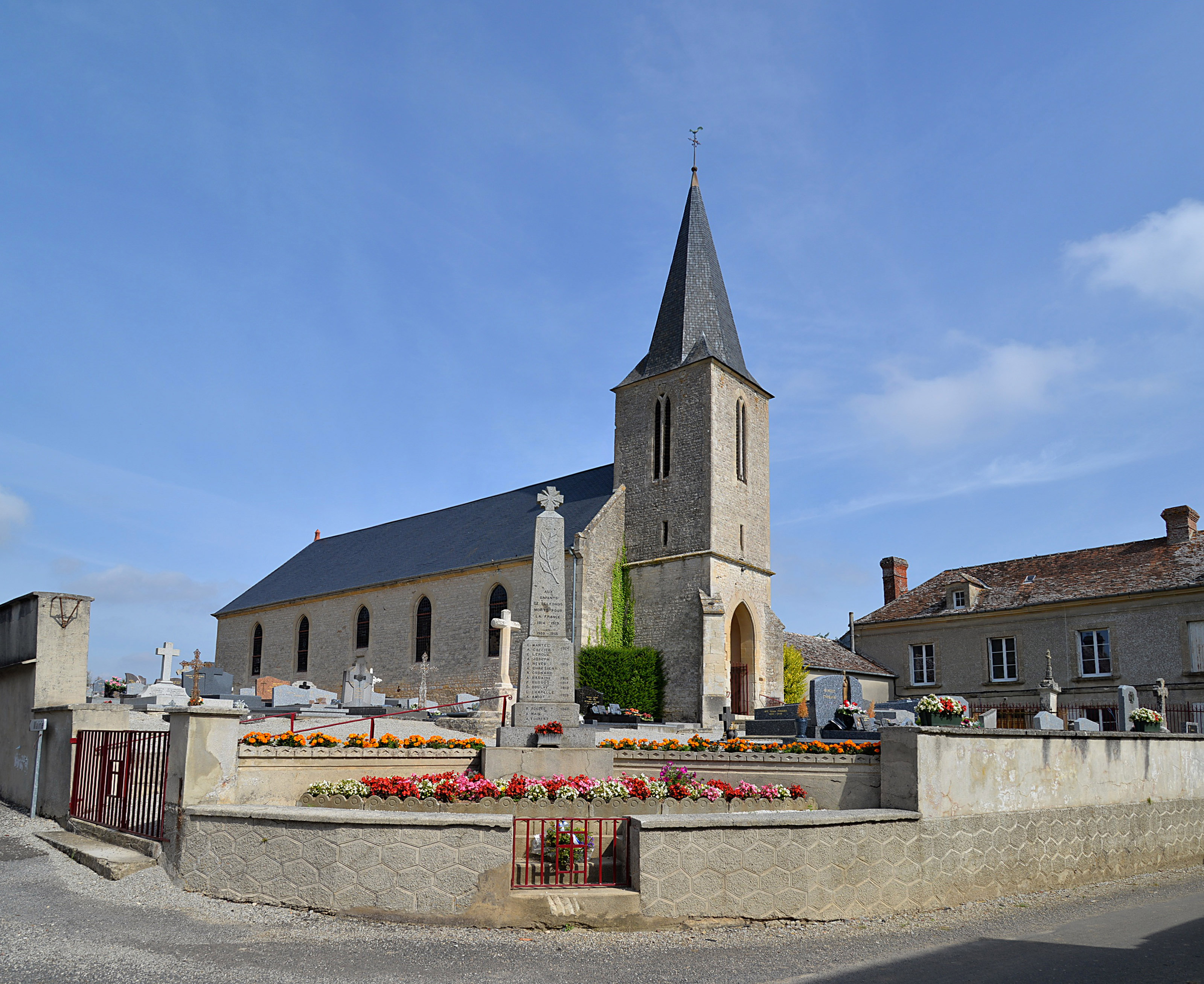
- The church in Belfonds
- Location of Belfonds
- Location within France Location within Normandy
- Coordinates: 48°36′41″N 0°07′07″E
- Country: France
- Region: Normandy
- Department: Orne
- Arrondissement: Alençon
- Canton: Sées
- Intercommunality: CC des Sources de l'Orne

Government
  - Mayor (2020–2026): Jean-Pierre Rolland
- Area^{1}: 14.29 km^{2} (5.52 sq mi)
- Elevation: 215 m (705 ft)
- Highest elevation: 245 m (804 ft)
- Lowest elevation: 170 m (560 ft)
- Population (2023): 212
  - Density: 14.8/km^{2} (38.4/sq mi)
- Time zone: UTC+01:00 (CET)
  - Summer (DST): UTC+02:00 (CEST)
- INSEE/Postal code: 61036 /61500
- ^{1} French Land Register data, which excludes lakes, ponds, glaciers > 1 km^{2} (0.386 sq mi or 247 acres) and river estuaries.

Belfonds (French pronunciation: [bɛlfɔ̃]) is a commune in the Orne department in northwestern France.

== Geography ==
The commune is made up of the following collection of villages and hamlets, Guichaumont, Le Haut Condé, Condé-le-Butor, Le Roussillon, La Fosse, La Philippière, La Perrière, Saint-Clair, Haussepied, Les Petites Bruyères and Belfonds.

It is 1,430 hectares (5.5 sq mi) in size. The highest point in the commune is 221 metres (725 ft).

Belfonds along with another 65 communes is part of a 20,593 hectare, Natura 2000 conservation area, called the Haute vallée de l'Orne et affluents.

Belfonds has a total of seven water courses running through it, three rivers Orne, Senneviere and Thouane. The other four watercourses are all streams, The Ponts Besnard, The Renardieres, The Iles & the Viverel.

== Population ==
Historical population
Year	Pop.	±% p.a.
1968	292	—
1975	250	−2.19%
1982	213	−2.26%
1990	207	−0.36%
1999	218	+0.58%
2007	178	−2.50%
2012	188	+1.10%
2017	205	+1.75%
2023	212	+0.56%
Source: INSEE

== Notable buildings and places ==
=== National heritage sites ===
The Commune has two buildings and areas listed as a Monument historique.

- Cléray Manor a sixteenth century manor house, listed as a monument in 2016.
- Saint-Latuin Chapel is the former church, of Cléray whose commune was abolished in 1802. It is believed that Latuinus, first bishop of Sées took refuge here to escape the wrath of the wife of the governor of Sées, jealous of his miracles. The bishop stopped at the edge of a fountain and built a cell and an oratory. The fountain is believed to have healing powers and on the last Sunday of June each year, pilgrimage proceeds here from the center of Belfonds.
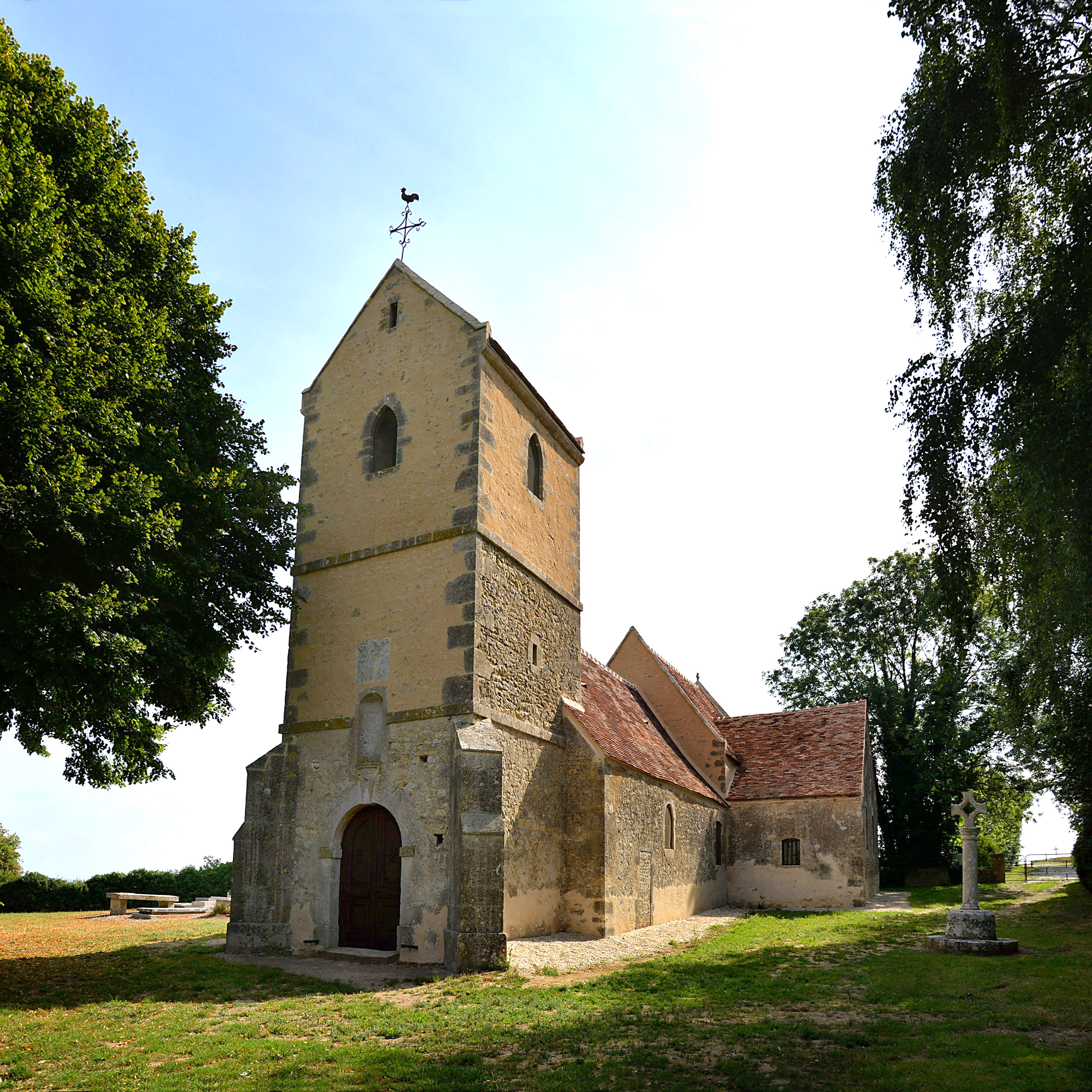
Church of Saint-Latuin

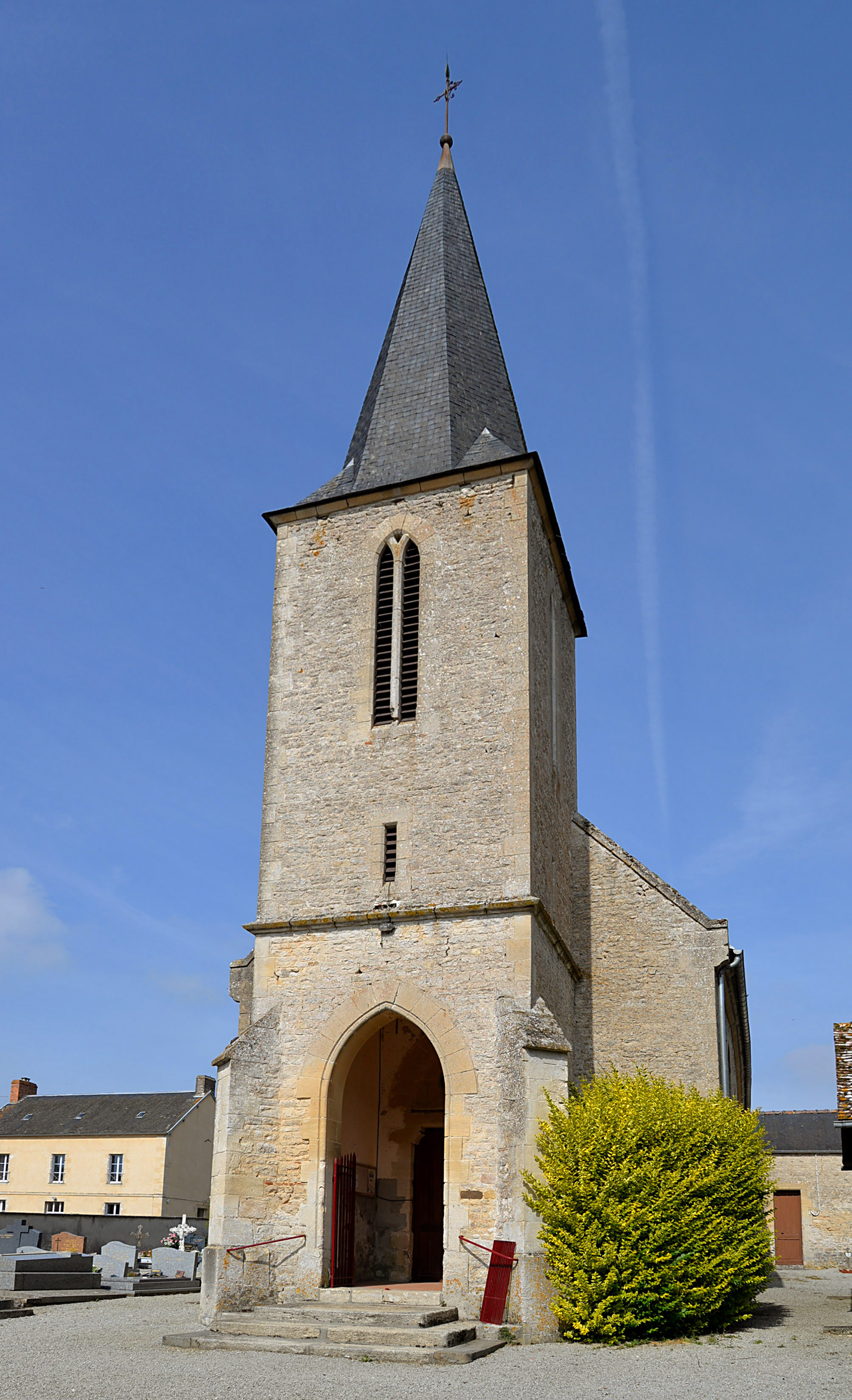
Church of Notre-Dame-de-l'Assomption

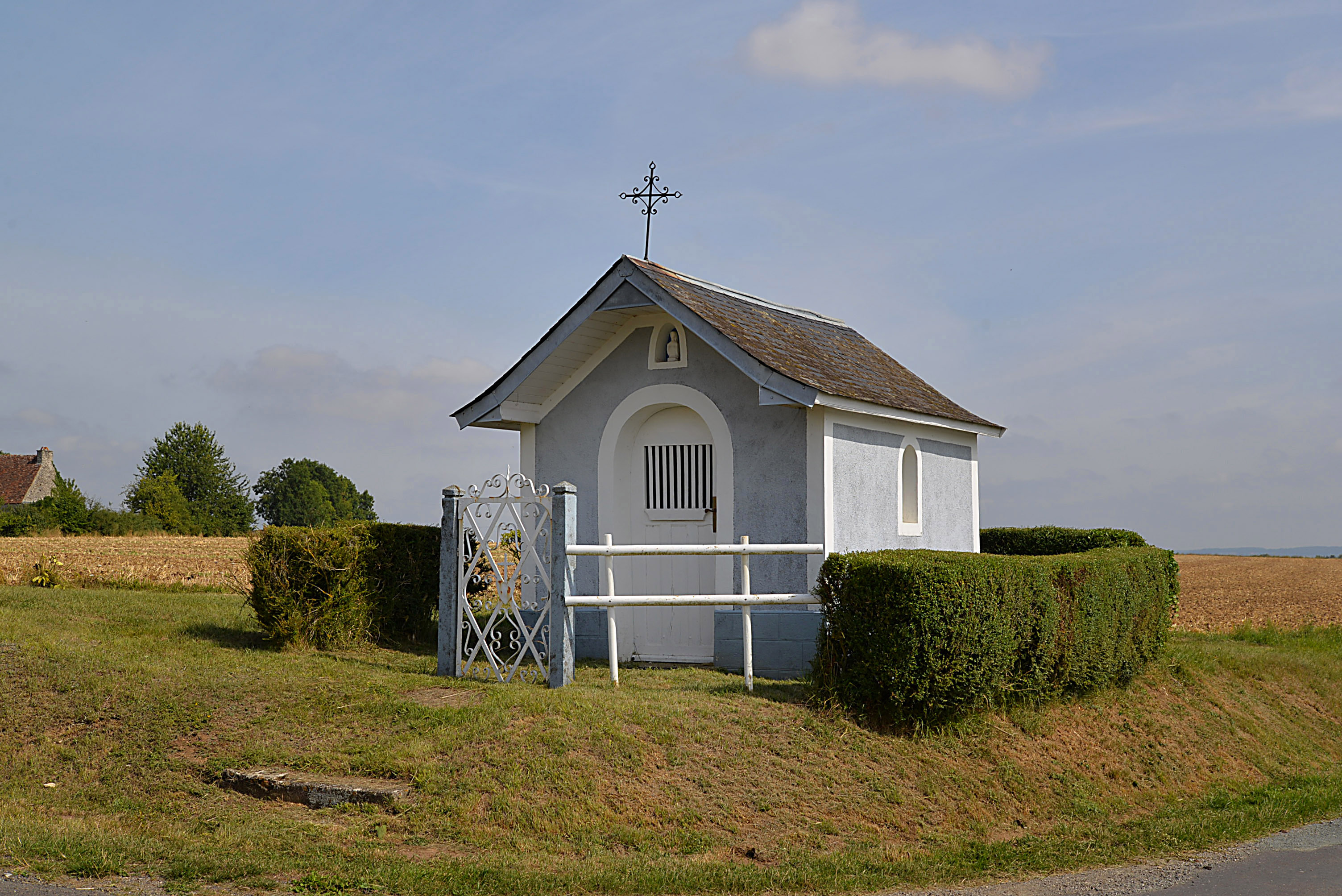
Chapel of Saint-Clair

== See also ==
- Communes of the Orne department
