= Escoville =

- Commune
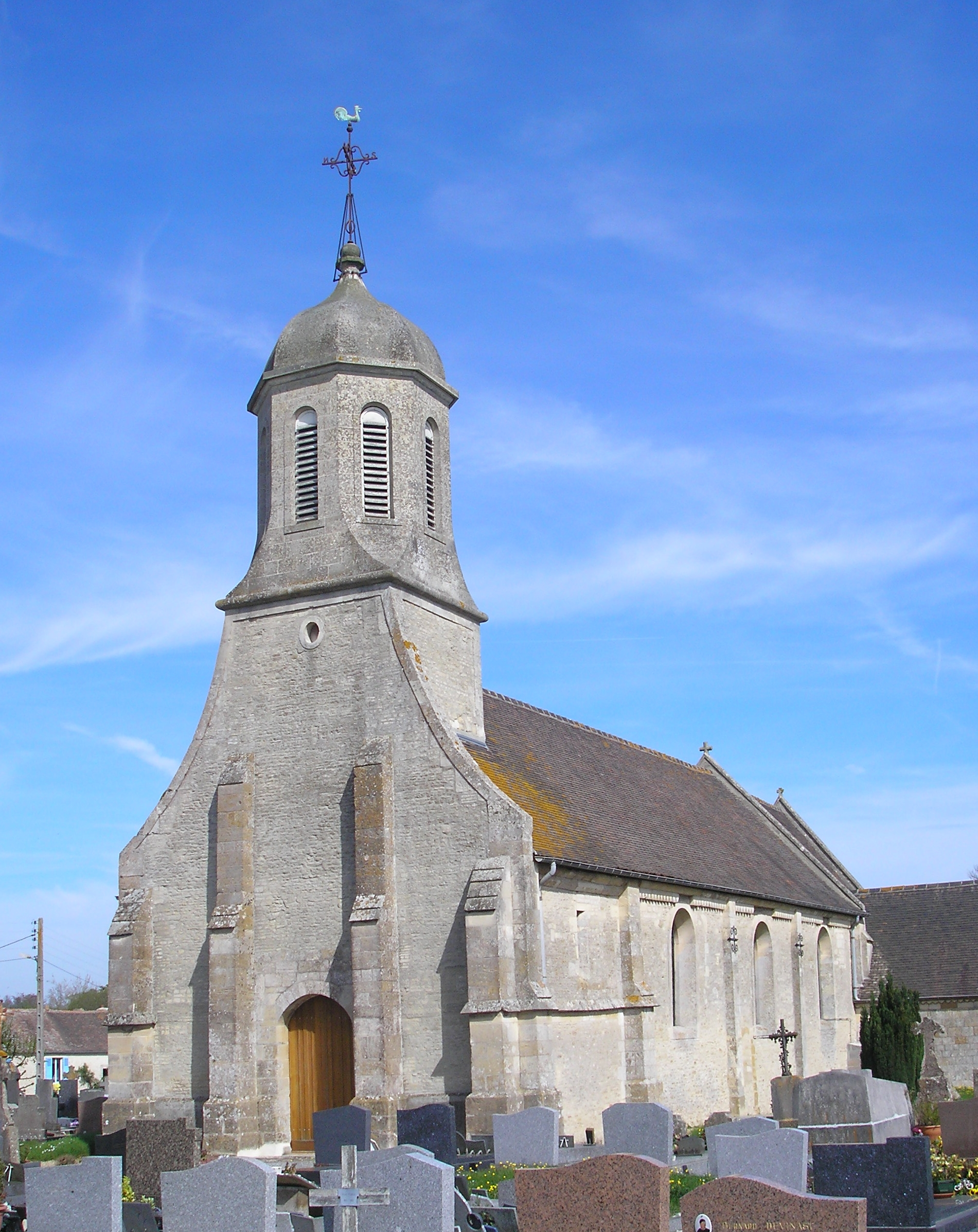
- Saint-Laurent

- Coat of arms
- Location of Escoville
- Location within France Location within Normandy
- Coordinates: 49°12′40″N 0°14′13″W
- Country: France
- Region: Normandy
- Department: Calvados
- Arrondissement: Lisieux
- Canton: Troarn
- Intercommunality: CC Normandie-Cabourg-Pays d'Auge

Government
  - Mayor (2020–2026): Christophe Cliquet
- Area^{1}: 5.18 km^{2} (2.00 sq mi)
- Highest elevation: 42 m (138 ft)
- Lowest elevation: 13 m (43 ft)
- Population (2023): 920
  - Density: 180/km^{2} (460/sq mi)
- Time zone: UTC+01:00 (CET)
  - Summer (DST): UTC+02:00 (CEST)
- INSEE/Postal code: 14246 /14850
- ^{1} French Land Register data, which excludes lakes, ponds, glaciers > 1 km^{2} (0.386 sq mi or 247 acres) and river estuaries.

Escoville is a commune in the Calvados department in the Normandy region in northwestern France, with a population of 803 people as of 2017.

== Population ==
Historical population
Year	Pop.	±% p.a.
1968	417	—
1975	460	+1.41%
1982	438	−0.70%
1990	623	+4.50%
1999	626	+0.05%
2007	728	+1.90%
2012	751	+0.62%
2017	803	+1.35%
2023	920	+2.29%
Source: INSEE

== Geography ==
Escoville is located 5 kilometers north of Troarn, 11 kilometers northeast of Caen, 14 kilometers south of Cabourg, and 35 kilometers from Deauville. Escoville is part of the urban area of Caen.

== Toponymy ==
The name of the locality is attested in the form Scotvilla in 1101 (note AG according to the Red Cartulary of Troarn); Escoldivilla in 1109 (Dictionnaire topographique, according to the cartulary of Troarn); Scolvilla in 1156 - 1161 (act H 2, 169); Escotvilla in 1201 (AC, H 941); Ecovilla in 1128 (charter of Sainte-Barbe); Escovilla in 1208 (Charter of the abbey of Aunay).

Albert Dauzat and, following him, Ernest Nègre consider that the first element Escold- represents the Germanic personal name Ascald(us), variant form Ascolt, while there is no ancient form in As-. Furthermore, they did not know the first form Scotvilla, which is entirely compatible with the evolutions Escotvilla > Ecovilla (type scola > escole > école), but not really with *Ascaldvilla > Escoldivilla or *Ascoltvilla > Escoldivilla, we should end up in *Escauville in one case and *Escouville in the other. This is why François de Beaurepaire identifies the ethnic scot as "Scottish" (Scot as "the Scotsman" cf. surname Lescot, modern French l'Écossais).

Homonymy with Escoville (Seine-Maritime, Saint-Laurent-de-Brèvedent, Escoville par. de Saint-Laurent d’Esquetot, 1558). The name (E)scoville has evolved into the English last names Scoville (Anglo-Norman form), Scovill, Scoffield, Schofield, and Scourfield.

== See also ==
- Communes of the Calvados department
