= Saint Landry =

Saint Landry may refer to:

== People ==
- Landry of Sées (Saint Landericus or Saint Landry)
- Landry of Soignies a.k.a. Saint Landry of Metz
- Landry of Paris (Saint Landericus of Paris)

== Places ==
- St. Landry Parish, Louisiana, United States
- Saint Landry, Louisiana, United States

== See also ==
- Landry (disambiguation)
