= Landry of Sées =

Saint Landry of Sées
- Died: March 4, 480; Sées, Domain of Soissons
- Venerated in: Roman Catholic Church; Eastern Orthodox Church
- Feast: July 16

Landry of Sées (Landericus) was a Gallo-Roman saint and bishop. The earliest record found of a person named Landry was in the 5th century ca. 450 in the person of St. Landry, third Bishop of Sées who died on March 4, 480 and whose feast day is July 16.

Landry was the successor of Saint Sigibold, himself successor of Saint Latuin (Latuinus, Lain, or Latuin), first occupant of the episcopal see (from 400 to 440). He lived in great sanctity and was responsible for great progress of Christianity in his diocese.

It appears that this was done in spite of great resistance, because in his legend, it is said that he was placed in a barrel filled with flax combs and rolled from the top to the bottom of a mountain. Nevertheless, this fact is not ascertained and he died at a great age on March 4, 480, in the arms of Saint Contest, Bishop of Bayeux, who happened to be in Seez at the time.

== Veneration ==
He was buried in his cathedral dedicated to the Virgin. It is not the magnificent gothic building that can still be seen, because the one in which Saint Landry rested was destroyed in 878, during the invasion by the Saxons.

His name appears in the Martyrology of Ainon and as soon as the eleventh century there was a saint's day for him on July 16. Focoal inserted in a Breviary a double service in his honor. This office has been recited in the diocese until 1864. In all the churches, the following prayer was said:

Lord Almighty, who had tested the faith of the Blessed Saint Landry and rewarded his piety, enliven us with a great zeal in order to work, in following his example, for our sanctification, and sustain our weakness, with the help of the prayers of your faithful servant. Grant us this grace, by Jesus Christ our Lord. Amen.

— Focoal, Prayer to St. Landry

== Sources ==
- Life of the Saints of the Diocese of Seez (Volume 1, 178)
