= Sées Cathedral =

- Sées Cathedral
- Basilique Cathédrale Notre-Dame de Sées
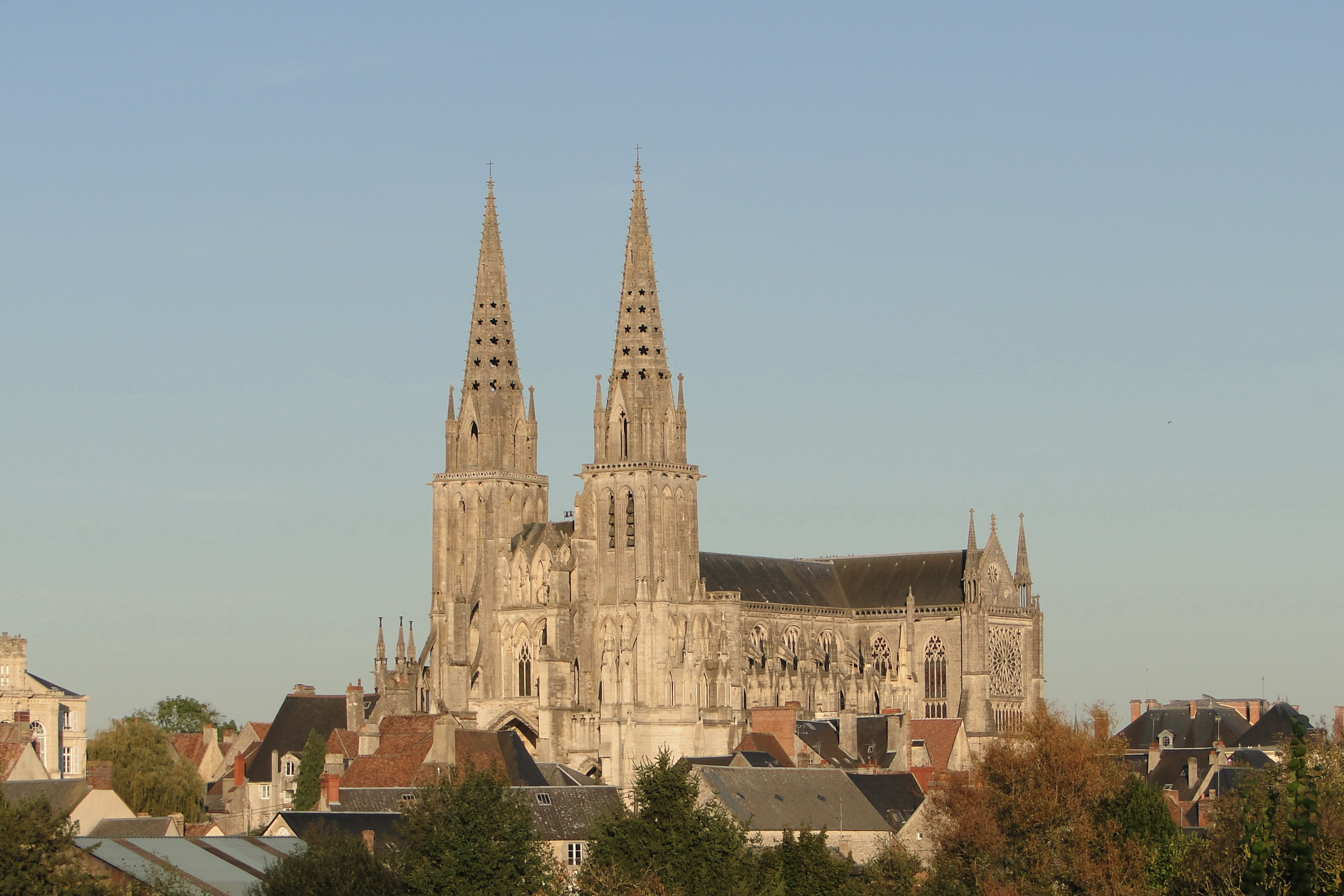
- Sées Cathedral
- Sées Cathedral
- 48°36′19″N 0°10′23″E
- Country: France
- Denomination: Roman Catholic
- Website: In French

History
- Status: Cathedral, Minor basilica
- Founded: 1 January 1210
- Consecrated: September 20, 1310

Architecture
- Functional status: Active

Administration
- Diocese: Séez

Clergy
- Bishop: Jacques Léon Jean Marie Habert

Monument historique
- Official name: Basilique Cathédrale Notre-Dame de Sées
- Type: Classé
- Designated: 1875

Sées Cathedral (French: Basilique Cathédrale Notre-Dame de Sées) is a Roman Catholic church and national monument of France in Sées (formerly also Séez) in Normandy. It is the seat of the Bishop of Séez.

The cathedral was declared a basilica minor on 7 March 1871.

The Gothic cathedral dates from the 13th and 14th century and occupies the site of three earlier churches. The west front has large buttresses and two openwork spires 230 ft. high. The nave was built towards the end of the 13th century in the Norman Gothic style, with a high triforium and much surface enrichment. The choir, built soon afterwards in the Rayonnant style, is remarkable for the lightness of its construction. In the choir are four bas-reliefs representing scenes in the life of the Virgin Mary; and the altar is adorned with another depicting the removal of the relics of Saints Gervais and Protais. The church has constantly been the object of restoration and reconstruction, with the choir being entirely rebuilt in the 1870s.

In 1875 it was declared a monument historique.

The cathedral has a magnificent organ by Cavaillé-Coll which has recently been restored. Sunday afternoon recitals are held during July and August. The choir organ is also by the same maker.

In 2015, during restoration work on the North Tower, three new bells were installed.

== See also ==
- List of Gothic Cathedrals in Europe

== Sources ==
- Cathédrale Notre-Dame de Sées at Structurae
- Cathédrales-de-France: Sées
- Catholic Encyclopedia: Séez
