= Opportuna of Montreuil =

Frankish Benedictine nun

Saint Opportuna of Montreuil
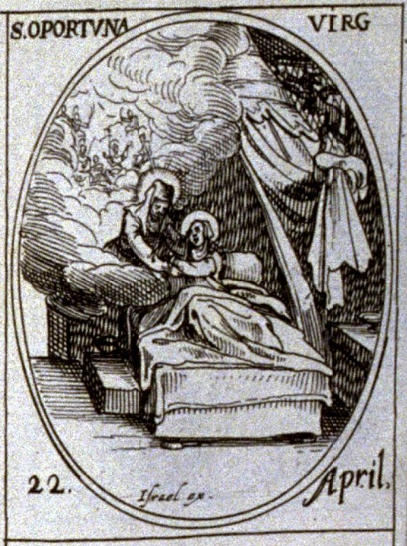
- Opportuna being visited by the Virgin on her deathbed, engraving by Jacques Callot (c. 1630)

Abbess and Virgin
- Born: unknown at the castle of Exmes, Argentan, near Ayesmes, Normandy, France
- Died: 22 April 770; Montreuil, France
- Venerated in: Eastern Orthodox Church; Roman Catholic Church
- Feast: 22 April
- Attributes: Carrying an abbess's crozier and a casket of relics; with the Virgin appearing at her deathbed; as a princess with a basket of cherries and the fleur-de-lys
- Patronage: Diocese of Séez

Opportuna of Montreuil (died 770) was a Frankish Benedictine nun and abbess. A Vita et miracula Sanctae Opportunae was written within a century of her death (c. 885–88) by Adalhelm (later rendered Adelin), bishop of Séez, who believed he owed his life and his see to Opportuna.

== Life ==
When she was still young, Opportuna became a Benedictine nun at the convent called the Monasteriolum^{[a]} near Almenêches, where her cousin Lantildis was abbess. Opportuna took the veil from her brother, Chrodegang (later rendered Godegrand), the bishop of Séez.^{[b]} Although Montreuil was only three miles away from Séez, Chrodegang was murdered on the way to visit his sister at the abbey.^{[c]} Later Opportuna succeeded her cousin as abbess. In this position, she was conventionally described as "a true mother to all her nuns", correcting their faults, significantly enough to record, with words, not blows.

Some sources say that Opportuna died^{[e]} from a brief illness which was compounded by grief from the death of her brother, as Chrodegang had died on 3 September 769. His murder had been planned by Chrodobert, a powerful relation to whom he had entrusted the administration of his diocese during his seven years' absence at Rome. Though she foresaw her brother's death in a prophetic vision, Opportuna was powerless to intervene; afterwards she buried Chrodegang in her own convent. Whatever the cause, Opportuna died on 22 April 770.

== Hagiography ==
Like all Carolingian saints, Opportuna's sanctity was not expressed in charismatic actions during her lifetime: she effected no miracles during her lifetime. Though the cult of the saintly dead and hagiography flourished, "the Carolingian era forms an interlude in the history of sainthood, for no charismatic ascetics, healers, prophets or visionaries made their mark on a church whose bishops were implacably hostile to any such forms of expression," Julia Smith has observed, in analysing Carolingian attitudes towards appropriate representations of female sainthood through the lens of the Vita et miracula Sanctae Opportunae.

The account of miracles worked at the site of Opportuna's tomb reminded readers and hearers that the abbess remained present in her former precincts, extending her protection to her flock forward in time. Julia Smith has detected that the comparatively small corpus of hagiographies of female saints^{[d]} are restricted in the area in which they were produced, north of the Loire and east of the Rhine for the greatest part.

Opportuna's vita records that once a peasant stole a donkey from the convent and refused to acknowledge his crime. Opportuna turned the matter over to God, and the next day the farmer's field was sown with salt. The repentant peasant both returned the donkey and gave the nuns the field.

== Veneration ==
Though she was not recorded in the martyrologies, the cultus of Saint Opportuna has always flourished locally, as a patroness of Almanèches and among the patrons of Paris; she was praised in the acta of her kinsman, Chrodegang/Godegrand. During the reign of Charles the Bald, according to the sources,^{[f]} Vikings invaded; both the convent at Montreuil and the abbey at Almenèches were destroyed, and her relics were translated to the priory of Moussy. Later they were moved to Senlis. In 1374, her right arm and a rib were enshrined in a small church dedicated to her in Paris, near a hermitage called Notre Dame des Bois Paris. As the city grew, so did the church. Most of Opportuna's head still rests at Moussy, while her left arm and part of her skull are still at Almenèches; additionally, a jaw bone can be found in the priory of Saint Chrodegang at Île-Adam. Her shrine in Paris is carried in processions along with the relics of Saints Honoré and Geneviève.

=== Iconography ===
In art, Saint Opportuna is often depicted carrying an abbess's crozier and a casket of relics. She may also be shown with the Virgin appearing at her deathbed or as a princess with a basket of cherries and a fleur-de-lys.

== Notes ==
1. Meaning "little monastery", it later gave its name to Montreuil-la-Cambe.
2. He should probably not be conflated with Chrodegang of Metz.
3. Opportuna's brother is identified with Saint Chrodegang of Metz by at least one source. However, Opportuna's story, which places him as Bishop of Séez and being murdered by a rival while on the road to Montreuil, is not mentioned in any resources relating to his life, which state instead that he died on 6 March 776 at Metz.
4. Lacking opportunities for public careers, their lives offered few events. Three Merovingian hagiographies of female saints circulated widely: Geneviève of Paris (d. 502), Venantius Fortunatus' vita of Radegund (d. 587) and that of Gertrude of Nivelles. To these can be added the Hiberno-Latin vita of Brigid (Smith 1995:13).
5. Here, Adalhelm envisions her being summoned to Heaven by Cecilia and Lucy.
6. The Siege of Paris (885-886) took place during the reign of Charles the Fat, who may have been intended.
