= Victor Ruprich-Robert =

French architect

Victor, Marie, Charles Ruprich-Robert
- Born: February 18, 1820} Paris, France
- Died: May 7, 1887 (aged 67); Cannes, France
- Occupation: Architect
- Known for: Notre-Dame de Paris; Château d'Amboise

Victor, Marie, Charles Ruprich-Robert (born February 18, 1820, in Paris, France – died on May 7, 1887, in Cannes, France) was an architect, chief architect of historic monuments, general inspector of historic monuments and art historian.

== Biography ==
After studying with Simon-Claude Constant-Dufeux at the École des Beaux-Arts, he became Eugène Viollet-le-Duc's substitute for the History and Composition of Ornament course at the École Nationale et Spéciale de Dessin from 1843.

In 1840, he was appointed to the Commission des Monuments Historiques, after having surveyed the church of Saint-Nicolas in Caen. In 1844, he asked to be appointed inspector of works at Notre-Dame Cathedral in Paris. On December 20, 1848, he was appointed diocesan architect for Notre-Dame Cathedral in Bayeux, and for diocesan buildings in Coutances and Séez. From 1874, he oversaw restoration work on the Church of Saint-Étienne in Caen (Abbey aux Hommes), the Château de Falaise from 1864, the Church of Saint-Samson in Ouistreham and the Church of Hambye.

He has also been active in other regions, restoring the Château d'Amboise, the tower of the ancient Château d'Oudon, and the churches of Saint-Martin d'Argentan and Saint-Sauveur in Dinan.

His son and pupil Gabriel Ruprich-Robert (1859–1953) was also Chief Architect and Inspector General.
