= Landry =

Landry may refer to:

== People ==
- Landry (surname), of French origin
- Landry Bender (born 2000), American actress
- Landry Nguémo (1985–2024), Cameroonian professional football player
- Landry Jones (born 1989), American football player
- Landry Fields (born 1988), American basketball executive
- Landry Shamet (born 1997), American basketball player

== Places ==
- Landry, Savoie, a French town in the Savoie département

== Other ==
- Saint Landry (disambiguation), people and places

== Fictional characters ==
- Landry (Sanrio character), fictional boy raccoon created by the Japanese toy company Sanrio
- Landry Clarke, Matt Saracen's best friend in the Friday Night Lights television series
- Landry du Lauzon, the protagonist of the television series Knightfall
