= Sigefroi =

Bishop of Séez
- Venerated in: Roman Catholic Church

Sigefroi or Sifroi (Sigefridus) was a Norman prelate of the early 11th century in what is today France.

Sigefroi was probably installed in the bishopric of Sees by the lords of Belleme around 1017. They restores some of the property of the bishopric they had monopolized in order to restore the chapter cathedral.

Sigefroi signed a charter of Guillaume de Dijon, abbot of Fécamp in 1017. In another document Sigefroi confirms in 1020 the donation of Richard, duke of Normandy, to the church of Sées of half of the city and the land of Boéville.
