= Azon the Venerable =

Catholic prelate

Bishop of Séez
- Died: 1006
- Venerated in: Roman Catholic Church

Azon the Venerable (Atso or Azo) was a prelate of the late 10th and early 11th century.

Under his rule the episcopal seat of Sées is restored after more than half a century of vacancy, following the destruction of the Carolingian cathedral and the enslavement by the Vikings of his bishop Adelin. This recovery is linked to the ecclesiastical normalization undertaken by the Duke of Normandy Richard Ist. During his episcopate, Azon raised the ruins of Sees Cathedral around 986, using stones from the fortifications of the city) the Venerable This cathedral will be burned by Yves de Bellême in 1047 to dislodge brigands knights.

In 990 he attended the dedication of the abbey church of Fécamp and the assembly held there in 1006.

Azon died in 1006.
