= Jean-Baptiste du Plessis d'Argentré =

- Bishop of Séez
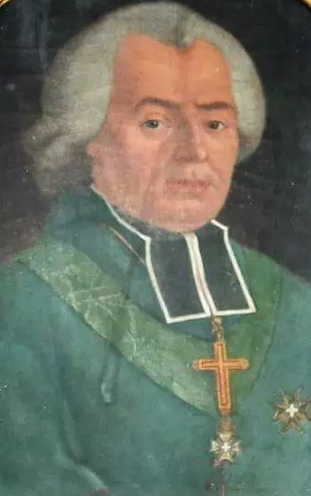
- Church: Catholic Church
- Diocese: Diocese of Séez
- In office: 18 December 1775 – 24 February 1805
- Predecessor: Louis-François Néel de Christot
- Successor: Hilarion-François de Chevigné de Boischollet
- Previous post: Titular Bishop of Thagaste (1774-1775)

Orders
- Consecration: 20 March 1774 by François de Narbonne-Lara

Personal details
- Born: 1 November 1720 Argentré, Bretagne, Kingdom of France
- Died: 24 February 1805 (aged 84) Münster, Principality of Münster, Kingdom of Prussia, Holy Roman Empire

Jean-Baptiste du Plessis d'Argentré (1 November 1720 – 24 February 1805) was Bishop of Séez, Normandy, from 17 Sep 1775 until his death.

Jean-Baptiste was born in the Château de Plessis in Argentré-du-Plessis in Brittany, from where the family took their name, to Pierre, former page of Louis XIV, and Marie-Louise Hindret de Ravenne.

He was tutor to the Enfants de France, the children of the French royal family, and the King's almoner. He was also (commendatory) abbot of the abbeys of Olivet (1749), Saint-Germain d'Auxerre (1761), Silly-en-Gouffern (1776) and Saint-Aubin, Angers (1781).
