= Guillaume-André-Réné Baston =

French theologian

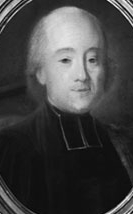
French bishop Guillaume André René Baston (1741–1825)

Guillaume-André-René Baston (29 November 1741, at Rouen – 26 September 1825, at Saint-Laurent) was a French theologian.

== Life ==
He studied theology at St. Sulpice in Paris and finished his studies at Angers. He was then appointed professor of theology at Rouen. During the French Revolution he wrote against the Civil Constitution of the Clergy. Having refused to take the oath, he was obliged to go into exile (1792), first to London, then to Holland, and finally to Coesfeld in Westphalia. In 1803 he returned to Rouen, where he was appointed vicar-general and dean of the chapter by Archbishop Cambacérès. As a Gallican, he won the favor of Napoleon, who appointed him Bishop of Séez (1813), and the chapter of the cathedral accepted him as capitular vicar. Pope Pius VII failing to approve of this nomination, the cathedral chapter revoked the nomination (1814), and Baston went into retirement at Saint-Laurent near Pont-Audemer, where he died.

== Works ==
Baston was the author of numerous works on theology, the most important being Lectiones theologicae, written while he was professor of theology, in collaboration with Louis-Théopompe Tuvache de Vertville (10 vols., Rouen, 1818).

He published several polemical works on the subject of theology:

- Réponse au mémoire et à la consulation de M. Linguet, touchant l'indissolubilité du mariage (Paris, 1772)
- Les entretiens du pape Ganganelli (Clement XIV) (Antwerp, 1777)
- Voltairimeros, ou première journée de M. de Voltaire dans l'autre monde (Brussels, 1779)

During the Revolution he wrote many pamphlets against the Civil Constitution of the Clergy. His book Doctrine catholique sur le mariage (1791) was published about the same time. During his exile in Kösfeld he began his Mémoires, edited later by the Société d'histoire contemporaine (3 vols., Paris, 1897–99).

In his last years, he wrote:

- Réclamation pour l'Église de France et pour la vérité contra l'ouvrage de M. le comte de Maistre [Du Pape] (Rouen, 1821)
- Antidote contre les erreurs et la réputation de l'Essai sur l'indifférence en matière de religion (Paris, 1823)
- Concordance des lois civiles et des lois ecclésiastiques touchant le mariage (Paris, 1824).
