= Litardus =

Bishop of Séez
- Venerated in: Roman Catholic Church

Litharedus was a bishop of Sees from the first half of the sixth century.

He was the first bishop of Séez whose presence is attested. He attended in 511 the First Council of Orléans.
