= Landry (surname) =

Family name

- Pronunciation: /ˈlʌndri/
- Language: French

Origin
- Origin: Proto-Germanic: *landą ("land") and *rīkijaz ("mighty, king")
- Meaning: From the Old French masculine given name "Landri"
- Region of origin: France

Landry is a surname of French origin. Notable persons with the surname include:

- Adolphe Landry (1874–1956), French demographer and politician
- Auguste Charles Philippe Robert Landry (1846–1919), Canadian politician, Speaker of the Senate of Canada
- Ali Landry (born 1973), American actress and model
- Andrew Landry (born 1987), American golfer
- Beau Landry (born 1991), Canadian football player
- Bernard Landry (1937–2018), Premier of Quebec
- Carl Landry (born 1983), American basketball player
- Charles Landry (born 1948), British author, urban planner
- Cindy Landry (born 1972), Canadian pair skater
- Dan Landry (born 1970), American volleyball player
- Dawan Landry (born 1982), American football player
- Doug Landry (1964–2015), American football player
- Geoffroy IV de la Tour Landry (c. 1320–1391), French nobleman who compiled Livre pour l'enseignement de ses filles
- Ghislaine Landry (born 1988), Canadian rugby player
- Greg Landry (born 1946), American football player
- H. Scott Landry (born 1948 or 1949), American politician
- Hagan Landry (born 1994), American Paralympic athlete
- Harold Landry (born 1996), American football player
- Jarvis Landry (born 1992), American football player
- Jeanne Landry (1922–2011), Canadian composer, pianist and teacher
- Jeff Landry (born 1970), American politician
- Joseph Aristide Landry (1817–1881), US Congressman
- Joseph P. Landry (1922–2008), Canadian Senator
- Kyle Landry (born 1986), Canadian basketball player
- LaRon Landry (born 1984), American football player
- L. B. Landry (1878–1934), American physician, and civil rights activist
- Mabel Landry (1932–2025), American track and field athlete
- Michelle Landry (born 1962), Australian politician
- Nelly Landry (1916–2010), Belgian-born tennis player who later became a French citizen
- Sir Pierre-Amand Landry (1846–1916), Canadian lawyer, judge, and political figure
- Pierre Henri Landry (1899–1990), French tennis player
- Richard Landry (born 1957), Canadian architect
- Robert B. Landry (1909–2000), Major General US Air Force, adviser to President Truman
- Ron Landry (1943–2020), American politician and lawyer
- Ross Landry, Canadian politician
- Sam Landry (born 2003), American softball player
- Sirkka-Liisa Landry (1926–2008), Finnish chess master
- Tom Landry (1924–2000), American football player and coach
- Terry Landry Jr., American politician from Louisiana
- Terry Landry Sr. (born 1951), American politician from Louisiana

== See also ==
- Landry (disambiguation)
- St. Landry Parish, Louisiana
