= Adalhelm of Séez =

French Roman Catholic saint

Saint Adalhelm

Abbot and Bishop
- Died: c. 910
- Venerated in: Roman Catholic Church,Orthodox Church, True Orthodox Church
- Feast: 10 November

Adalhelm (Note: Also spelled Adelhelm, Hadelin, Adelelme, Adelin.) (died c. 910) was the bishop of Séez for twenty-six years starting around 884. He was a Benedictine monk and abbot at the abbey of Anisole. (Note: The monastery of Anisole, Maine, was founded by the hermit Calevisus (Saint Calais, 460-541), to whom the monastery was later rededicated, and from whom the town of Saint-Calais took its name.)

Adalhelm wrote a life and miracles of Saint Opportuna of Montreuil, Vita et miracula Sanctae Opportunae. It includes an autobiographical account of how he was captured by Vikings in the year of his consecration and sold into slavery. It is the only first-hand account of a Viking slave. He escaped or was redeemed and returned to Séez, where he fulfilled a vow had made by writing the life of Opportuna. The Vita survives only in a 14th-century manuscript and an early modern edition.
