= Latuinus =

Bishop of Sées

Saint Latuinus
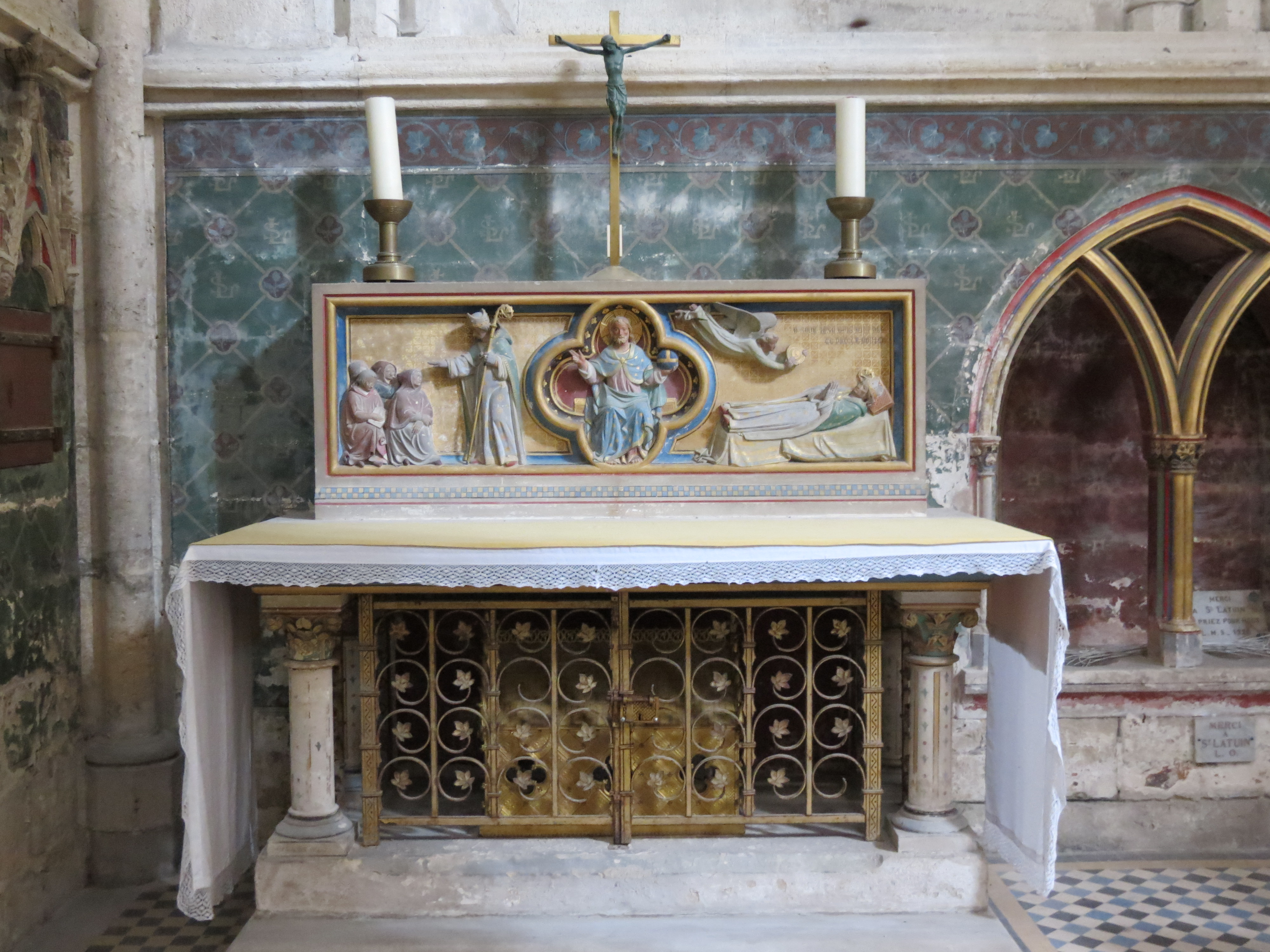
- Altar and reliquary of Saint Latuin, Sées Cathedral (2012)
- Died: ~440 AD
- Venerated in: Roman Catholic Church
- Feast: June 20
- Attributes: episcopal attire

Saint Latuinus (Latrium, Lain, Latuin) is venerated as a saint by the Roman Catholic Church. He is considered to have been the first bishop of Sées, during the 5th century, from 400 to 440 AD. According to the Catholic Encyclopedia, "Louis Duchesne believed that for the period anterior to 900 no reliance can be placed on the episcopal catalogue of Séez, which we know by certain compilations of the sixth century."

A later tradition makes him a 1st-century bishop and missionary sent to Sées by Pope Clement I. This had the intent of making the diocese of Sées have an older tradition than it actually had. According to another Christian tradition, he was sent to the region by Boniface I. Another local tradition states that Latuinus built an oratory on the site of the current Chapelle Saint-Latuin, in the diocese of Sées, towards the end of the 4th century.

== Veneration ==
According to one source, the devotion to Latuinus remains strong in the diocese of Sées, as evidenced by an annual pilgrimage to the Chapelle.
