= Radbod of Seez =

Bishop of Séez
- Venerated in: Roman Catholic Church

Bishop Radbod (Radbodus) was a French prelate of the 11th century.

== Family ==
Before becoming bishop of Sees, Radbod had a son, Guillaume Bonne-Âme, abbot of Saint-Etienne de Caen (1070-1079), then archbishop of Rouen (1079-1110). By his wife, he is related to the Flaitel family.

== Biography ==
His installation on the bishopric of Sees would be due to the will of the dukes of Normandy to regain control of the region held by Belleme.

His name appears in an act of donation of Richard, duke of Normandy, to Bernay Abbey dated 1027 at the latest. He also subscribes to the charter of Cerisy in 1032.
