= François Armand Gervaise =

François Armand Gervaise (1660–1761) was a French Cistercian and historian.

== Life ==
Gervaise was born in Paris. As a student, he met Bossuet, who recognized in him a learned writer and eloquent orator. He entered La Trappe in 1695, where he became the disciple of Armand Jean le Bouthillier de Rancé, and made his profession in 1696. In the same year, Zozime Foisil, who had succeeded de Rancé after his resignation, died after a few months of administration, and de Rancé then asked the king, with the pressing recommendation of Bossuet, for Gervaise as his second successor.

Gervaise received the abbatial benediction on 20 October 1696. But his turbulent administration, which in several points was opposed to that of de Rancé, soon made him unpopular. He resigned in 1698, but soon regretted the decision. He left La Trappe and began a wandering life from monastery to monastery, working as a writer.

The history of the Reform of Cîteaux caused his final disgrace. He was obliged to interrupt its publication, and was banished by order of the king to the Cistercian monastery of Le Reclus, where he died.

== Works ==
- the lives of several Fathers of the Church and other spiritual writers;
- the life of Abélard
- the life of Joachim of Fiore
- the life of Abbot Suger
- a criticism on Marsolier's Life of the Abbé de Rancé
