= Diocese of Séez =

Catholic diocese in France

Coordinates: 48°36′23″N 0°10′11″E

Diocese of Séez Dioecesis Sagiensis Diocèse de Séez

Catholic
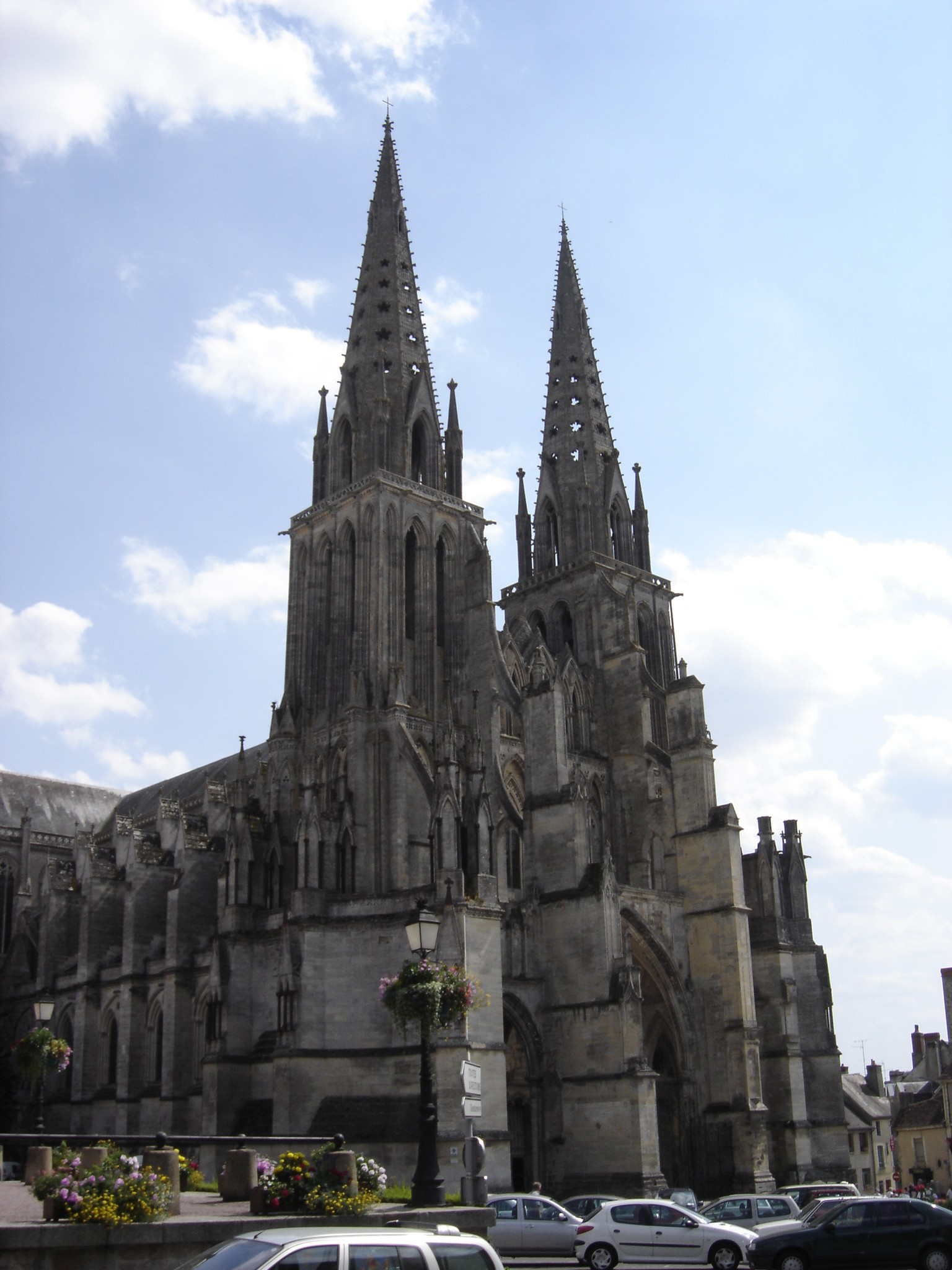
- Sées Cathedral

Location
- Country: France
- Ecclesiastical province: Rouen
- Metropolitan: Archdiocese of Rouen

Statistics
- Area: 6,103 km^{2} (2,356 sq mi)
- Population: Total; Catholics: (as of 2022); 279,942; 261,000 (est.) (93.2%)

Information
- Denomination: Catholic
- Sui iuris church: Latin Church
- Rite: Roman Rite
- Established: 3rd Century
- Cathedral: Cathedral Basilica of Notre Dame in Sées
- Secular priests: 58 (Diocesan) ▼34 (Religious Orders) ▼25 Permanent Deacons ▲

Current leadership
- Pope: Leo XIV
- Bishop elect: Bruno Feillet
- Metropolitan Archbishop: Dominique Lebrun

Map

Website
- orne.catholique.fr

The Diocese of Séez (Latin: Dioecesis Sagiensis; French: Diocèse de Séez) is a Latin Church diocese of the Catholic Church in France. Originally established in the 3rd century, the diocese encompasses the department of Orne in the region of Normandy. The episcopal see is the cathedral in Sées, and the diocese is a suffragan of the Archdiocese of Rouen.

In 2022, in the Diocese of Séez there was one priest for every 2,836 Catholics.

== History ==
Saint Ebrulf, a native of the Diocese of Bayeux, founded, after 560, several monasteries in the Diocese of Séez; one of them became the important Abbey of Saint-Martin-de-Séez, which, owing to the influence of its administrator-general, Cardinal Richelieu, the chief Minister of King Louis XIII, was reformed in 1636 by the Benedictines of Saint-Maur.

Richard I of Normandy (942–996) rebuilt the abbey of Fécamp. In 990, Bishop Azon (c. 986–1006) consecrated the church of the Abbey of the Trinity at Fécamp. In 1006, he attended a Chapter held at the monastery.

=== Chapter and cathedral ===
Bishop Azon (c. 986–1006) began the building of a new cathedral, dedicated to Nôtre-Dame-du-Vivier. In 1045, the old cathedral was burned to the ground, during an attack by the freebooting brothers Richard, Robert and Avesgaud de Soreng. The cathedral of Séez dates from the twelfth century; that of Alençon was begun in the fourteenth. The new cathedral of Séez was begun by Bishop Yves de Bellême (c. 1035–1070). It was consecrated by Bishop Jean (1123–1143) on 21 March 1126. In mid-1802, Cardinal Giovanni Battista Caprara, the papal legate in France, without consideration of local sensibilities, changed the dedication of the cathedral to the Assumption of the Blessed Virgin Mary.

In 1129, the cathedral Chapter, which was responsible for the service and administration of the cathedral, was reorganized, and changed from secular priests to religious priests following the Rule of Saint Augustine as practiced by the Canons Regular of Saint Victor in Paris. In 1131, the arrangement was approved by Innocent II at the Council of Reims. The Chapter was headed by eight dignities (Provost, Cantor, Achdeacon of Séez, Archdeacon Oximensis, Archdeacon Hulmensis, Archdeacon Bellensis, Archdeacon Corbonensis, and the Penitentiary) and sixteen canons (including the Theologus and the Praeceptor).

On 25 May 1199, Pope Innocent III signed the bull "Quoties a Nobis" for the canons of the cathedral of Séez, confirming all their privileges and possessions in detail.

On 22 November 1547, after striking an agreement with the canons and receiving the permission of King Henri II, Bishop Pierre Duval (1545–1564) replaced the Canons Regular of the cathedral with secular canons. A bull was obtained from Pope Paul III, "Clementia ejus" dated 19 November 1547, ratifying the agreement.

A provincial council of Normandy was held on 1 October 1196, in which Bishop Lisiard of Séez participated.

=== La Trappe ===
in fulfillment of a vow, Count Rotrou II of Perche established in 1122, at Soligny, the Abbey of La Trappe, in favour of which bulls were issued by Pope Eugene III ("Apostolici moderaminis," 7 June 1147), Pope Alexander III ("Religiosam Vitam," 18 December 1173) and Pope Innocent III ("Non absque dolore," 30 October 1203). In 1214, Bishop Sylvester (1202–1220) assisted Archbishop Robert of Rouen in the dedication of the abbey church of La Trappe.

A printing press was established in the diocese at Alençon in 1530, by Simon Dubois, soon joined by another by Robert Malassis.

=== Protestants ===
Bishop Pierre Duval (1545–1564) attended the Colloquy of Poissy in September–October 1561, presided over by Queen Mother Catherine de Medici, which attempted, unsuccessfully, to achieve a reconciliation between Catholics and Protestants in France. In the next year, Comte Gabriel de Montgomery, who had become a Protestant and who gave refuge to fellow believers in his domain near Vimoutiers in the diocese of Séez, 43 km (26.5 mi) north of Sées, conducted a sudden attack on Alençon which successfully brought the Protestants into possession of the city. They also raided Le Perch in the east, and the abbey of Belle-Étoile in the west of the diocese. In February 1563, Coligny and the Huguenot army, accompanied by Theodore de Bèze, entered the diocese. On 18 March, having pillaged the monastery of Almenèches, Coligny and part of his army arrived in Sées, where the house of the Cordeliers was pillaged and three of the friars killed. Fortunately, Bishop Duval was in Italy, attending the Council of Trent.

In 1568, open warfare between Catholics, led by the Marshal de Marigny, and the Protestants, led by Gabriel de Montgomery, broke out again in the diocese. In May, the situation was so bad in Sées that Bishop Louis de Moulinet (1564–1601) had to leave along with some of his clergy and seek refuge in Argentan. In September 1568, Protestant forces led by Montgomery entered Sées, and entirely destroyed the abbey of Saint-Martin. The cathedral and other churches in the neighborhood were pillaged. In November 1569, Bishop de Moulinet preached and conferred minor orders in Alençon, whose priest had apostasized and joined the Calvinists. Alençon quickly became a center of Protestantism. It was not until 1571 that Matigny was able to give his attention to repairing the damage which had been done to the city of Sées.

During the continuation of the St Bartholomew's Day massacre in 1572, Jacques Matignon, governor of Alençon and leader of the Catholics, succeeded in saving the lives of the Protestants at Alençon. Catholic priests and nuns were harassed and driven out.

The future bishop of Séez, Jean Bertaut (1606–1611), who was Abbot of Sainte-Marie-d'Aulnay and First Almoner to Queen Catherine de Medici at the time, was present at the assassination of King Henry III of France on 1 August 1589. Bertaut supported the legal heir, the Protestant Henry of Navarre, who became King Henry IV of France. The future bishop Claude de Morenne (1600–1606) presented a funeral oration at the death of Henry III, and wrote poems and a panegyric for the coronation of Henry IV.

=== French Revolution ===
On 2 November 1789, the National Assembly proclaimed that all ecclesiastical property was confiscated by the State.

Even before it directed its attention to the Church directly, the National Constituent Assembly attacked the institution of monasticism. On 13 February 1790. it issued a decree which stated that the government would no longer recognize solemn religious vows taken by either men or women. In consequence, Orders and Congregations which lived under a Rule were suppressed in France. Members of either sex were free to leave their monasteries or convents if they wished, and could claim an appropriate pension by applying to the local municipal authority.

The National Constituent Assembly ordered the replacement of political subdivisions of the ancien régime with subdivisions called "departments", to be characterized by a single administrative city in the center of a compact area. The decree was passed on 22 December 1789, and the boundaries fixed on 26 February 1790, with the effective date of 4 March 1790. A new department was created called "Orne," and Alençon became the administrative city in the department.

The National Constituent Assembly then, on 6 February 1790, instructed its ecclesiastical committee to prepare a plan for the reorganization of the clergy. At the end of May, its work was presented as a draft Civil Constitution of the Clergy, which, after vigorous debate, was approved on 12 July 1790. There was to be one diocese in each department, requiring the suppression of approximately fifty dioceses. The diocese of Orne (Seez) was named the diocese of the department of Orne, and its seat fixed at Seez. A new metropolitanate was created, the "Metropole des côtes de la Manche," with its metropolitan seated in Rouen. Orne (Séez) was one of its suffragans. All ecclesiastical officials were required to subscribe to an oath to the Civil Constitution, or face deposition, ejection, arrest, trial, and deportation. Bishop Jean-Baptiste du Plessis d'Argentré, who was also serving as mayor of the city of Sées, refused to take the oath, and fled to England, from which he joined his brother in Münster, where he died on 24 February 1805. He, and all the other legitimate bishops of France, had been ordered by Pope Pius VII, in a brief of 16 July 1801, to resign his office. He refused, and was therefore deposed.

The Civil Constitution of the Clergy also abolished Chapters, canonries, prebends, and other offices both in cathedras and in collegiate churches. It also abolished chapters in abbeys and priories of either sex, whether regular or secular. On 14 January 1791, the General Council of the commune of Sées ordered the cathedral Chapter to cease its functions.

In February 1791, the electors of the department of the Orne elected the parish priest of Condé-sur-Seurthe, Marin Loublier, as constitutional bishop of Orne. He refused and protested, writing a pamphlet attacking the constitutional church as schismatic, and had to leave the department. He went to Paris, where he was arrested on 23 August 1792, and massacred at the prison of Saint-Fermin on 3 September 1792. With the refusal of Abbé Loublier, the electors, on 24 February 1791, chose the parish priest of Berus (diocese of Le Mans), André-Jacques-Simon Lefessier, as their constitutional bishop. He was uncanonically and blasphemously consecrated in Paris on 3 April 1791, by Jean-Baptiste Gobel. He remained in Paris from 1791 to 1793, as a member of the Legislative Assembly, having been refused admission by the canons of the cathedral in Séez. The constitutional clergy were constantly harassed and driven out by the Chouans, who supported the monarchy and were in revolt against the governments in Paris. On 15 March 1794, he appeared before the general council of the department of Oure, and resigned his ecclesiastical functions. After the death of Robespierre, however, he resumed his functions, until he was compelled to resign in the summer of 1801.

During the French Revolution the Trappists went with Dom Augustin de Lestranges, 26 April 1791, into Switzerland, where they founded the convent of La Val Saint. The Congregation returned to Soligny soon after the accession of Louis XVIII. Among the abbots of the Trappist monastery at Soligny were: Cardinal Jean du Bellay, who held a number of bishoprics and resigned his abbatial dignity in 1538; the historian Dom François Armand Gervaise, superior of the abbey from 1696 to 1698. The Grande Trappe of Soligny still exists in the Diocese of Séez.

=== Restoration ===
The French Directory fell in the coup engineered by Talleyrand and Napoleon on 10 November 1799. The coup resulted in the establishment of the French Consulate, with Napoleon as the First Consul. To advance his aggressive military foreign policy, he decided to make peace with the Catholic Church and the Papacy. In the concordat of 1801 between the French Consulate, headed by First Consul Napoleon Bonaparte, and Pope Pius VII, and in the enabling papal bull, "Qui Christi Domini", the constitutional diocese of Orne (Séez) and all the other dioceses in France, were suppressed. This removed all the institutional contaminations and novelties introduced by the Constitutional Church. The diocesan structure was then re-established by the papal bull "Qui Christi Domini" of 29 November 1801, including the diocese of Séez. The Concordat was registered as a French law on 8 April 1802.

The addition of some parishes of the Dioceses of Bayeux, Lisieux, Le Mans and Chartres, and the removal of some districts formerly included in the diocese of Séez, made the boundaries of the new diocese exactly coextensive with the civil department of Orne. The diocese of Séez is suffragan to the Archdiocese of Rouen in Normandy.

In the bull "Qui Christi Domini", Pius VII had allowed for the re-creation of cathedral Chapters, and had assigned to Cardinal Giovanni Battista Caprara, the papal legate in France, powers to see to their establishment, which he granted to each of the archbishops and bishops of the newly created dioceses. On 6 December 1802, Bishop Hilarion-François de Chevigné de Boischollet (1802–1812) established a Chapter, consisting of ten canons; he also added honorary canons, five in number. The canons, however, did not form a corporate body, and could not meet except with permission of the bishop, who presided. Contrary to Cardinal Caprara's instructions, no "dignity" was established; the two vicars-general of the bishop led the canons. At the insistence of the First Consul Bonaparte, the canons included several former officials of the schismatic constitutional church. On 18 December 1802, Bishop Boischollet issued a set of Statutes for the Chapter.

The diocesan seminary, which had been suppressed during the Revolution, was reopened by Bishop Boischollet on 1 November 1806, with 19 students.

==== Education ====
Before the application of the law of 1901 against religious congregations, the diocese had several teaching congregations of brothers, including the Redemptorists. Under the law, only the Frères des écoles chrétiennes, the Sulpicians, the Lazarists, the Spiritans, and the Pères des missions étrangères de Paris, were recognized.

Among the congregations of nuns originating in the diocese may be mentioned: the Sisters of Providence, a teaching and nursing institute founded in 1683 with mother-house at Séez; the Sisters of Christian Education, established in 1817 by Abbé Lafosse, mother-house at Argentan, and a branch of the order at Farnborough in England; the Soeurs de la Miséricorde de Séez (Sisters of Mercy), founded in 1818 by Abbé Jean-Jacques Bazin, vicar-general of Séez, to nurse the sick in their own homes.

In 1884 Monseigneur Buguet, curé of Montligeon chapel, founded an expiatory society for the abandoned souls in Purgatory, since erected by Pope Leo XIII into a Prima Primaria archconfraternity.

== Some bishops ==
- Saint Aunobertus (about 689). One set of sources places him in the late 6th century, while a document from Fontanelle places him in the year 688.
- Adelin of Séez, author of a work on the life and miracles of Saint Opportuna of Montreuil, sister of Bishop Godegrand (d. 770) and abbess of a Benedictine monastery called Monasteriolum in Séez.
- Jean Bertaut (1607–1611), who, with his fellow-student and friend, Jacques Davy Duperron, contributed to the conversion to Catholicism of Henry IV of France, and who was esteemed for his poetical talents.
- Guillaume-André-Réné Baston, appointed bishop of Séez by Napoleon I in 1813, but not approved by Pope Pius VII, who was still a prisoner at Savona.

== Diocesan pilgrimages ==
The diocese of Séez maintains a web page, listing the pilgrimages of the year.

== Bishops ==
"Louis Duchesne believed that for the period anterior to 900 no reliance can be placed on the episcopal catalogue of Séez, which we know by certain compilations of the sixth century." A later tradition assigns Saint Latuinus to the first century and makes him a missionary sent by Pope Clement I.

=== To 1000 ===
[ Saint Latuin ]
Sigisbold, c. 460
(c. 460) : Landry

- Nilllus or Hillus
- (c. 500) : Hubert de Sees

? (511) : Litardus

- (533–549) : Passivus
- (567–573) : Leudobaudis
- (c. 575–585) Hildebrand
- ? (c. 614) : ? Marcellus
- (c. 647/653–663) : Amlacarius

? (670–682) : Raverenus

- (c. 688–706) : Alnobertus
- (706) : Rodobert or Chrodobert, also count of Hiémois
- Hugues I (bishop of Sees), 8th century
- (???–750) : Ravenger
- Loyer or Lothaire, around 750
- (???– 770?) : Chrodegang or Godegrand
- (765–805) : Gerard
- (c. 811) : Reginald of Sees
- ( c. 833) : Ingelnom
- (840–852) : Saxoboldus
- (880–916) : Adalhelmus
- (10th cent.) : Robert I
- (10th cent.) : Benedict
- (c. 986–1006) : Azon the Venerable

=== 1000 to 1378 ===
- Richard
- (c. 1010–1026) : Sigefroi or Sigefroi
- (c. 1025–c. 1030) : Radbod
- (c. 1035–1070) : Yves de Bellême
- (c. 1070–c. 1081) : Robert de Ryes
- (1082–1091) : Gerard
- (1091–1123) : Serlon d'Orgères
- (1124–1143) : Jean de Neuville
- (1144–1157) : Gerard
- (1157–1184) : Froger
- (1184–1201) : Lisiard
- (1202–1220) : Sylvester
- (1220–1228) : Gervais of Chichester
- (1228–1240) : Hugues
- (1240–1258) : Geoffroy de Mayet
- (1258–1278) : Thomas d'Aunou
- (1278–1294) : Jean de Bernieres
- (1295–1315) : Philippe Le Boulanger
- (1315–1320) : Richard de Sentilly
- (1320–1356) : Guillaume Mauger
- (1356–1363) : Gervais de Belleau
- (1363–1378) : Guillaume de Rance

=== 1378 to 1650 ===
- (1378–1404) : Gregory Langlois, Avignon Obedience
- (1404–1408) : Pierre Beaublé, Avignon Obedience
- (1408–1422) : Jean, Avignon Obedience
- (1422–1433) : Robert de Rouvres
- (1433–1434) : Thibaut Lemoine
- (1434–1438) : Jean Chevalier
- (1438–1454) : Jean de Pérusse d'Escars
- (1454–1478) : Robert de Cornegrue
- (1478–1493) : Étienne Goupillon
- (1493–1502) : Gilles de Laval
- (1503–1510) : Claude d'Husson
- (1511–1539) : Jacques de Silly
- (1539–1545) : Nicolas de Dangu
- (1545–1564) : Pierre Duval
- (1564–1600) : Louis de Moulinet
- (1600–1606) : Claude de Morenne
- (1606–1611) : Jean Bertaut
- (1611–1614) : Jacques Suares
- (1614–1650) : Jacques Camus de Pontcarré

=== 1650 to 1801 ===
- (1651–1671) : François de Rouxel de Médavy
- (1672–1682) : Jean de Forcoal
- (1682–1698) : Mathurin Savary
- (1698–1710) : Louis d'Aquin
- (1710–1727) : Dominique-Barnabé Turgot de Saint-Clair
- (1728–1740) : Jacques-Charles-Alexandre Lallemant
- (1740–1775) : Louis-François Néel de Christot
- (1775–1791) : Jean-Baptiste du Plessis d'Argentré

Constitutional Church (schismatic). Diocese of Orne

- (1791–1801) : André-Jacques-Simon Lefessier

=== Since 1802 ===
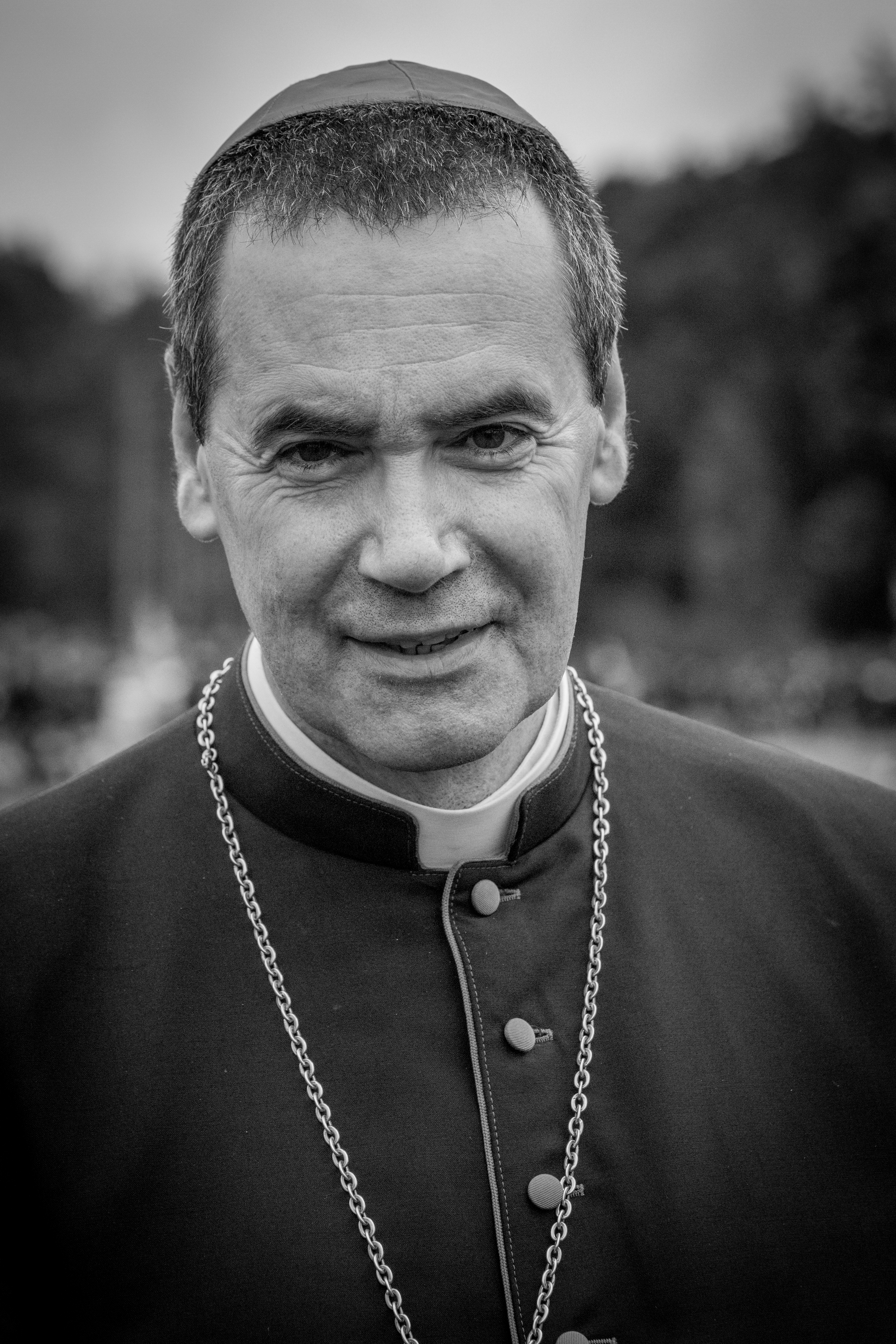
Bishop Jacques Habert

- (1802–1812) : Hilarion-François de Chevigné de Boischollet
- (1817–1836) : Alexis Saussol
- (1836–1843) : Mellon de Jolly
- (1843–1881) : Charles-Frédéric Rousselet
- (1881–1897) : François-Marie Trégaro
- (1897–1926) : Claude Bardel (14 Apr 1897 Appointed – 16 Feb 1926 Died)
- (1926–1961) : Octave-Louis Pasquet (21 Jun 1926 Appointed – 31 Mar 1961 Retired)
- (1961–1971) : André-Jean-Baptiste Pioger (31 Mar 1961 Appointed – 24 Jul 1971 Retired)
- (1971–1985) : Henri-François-Marie-Pierre Derouet
- (1986–2002) : Yves-Maria Guy Dubigeon (22 Aug 1986 Appointed – 25 Apr 2002 Retired)
- (2002–2010) : Jean-Claude Boulanger
- (2010–2020) : Jacques Léon Jean Marie Habert
- (2021–present) : Bruno Feillet (17 July 2021 – present)

== Bibliography ==
=== Reference books ===
- Eubel, Conradus, ed. (1913). Hierarchia catholica (in Latin). Vol. 1 (second ed.). Münster: Libreria Regensbergiana. pp. 333–334.
- Eubel, Conradus, ed. (1914). Hierarchia catholica (in Latin). Vol. 2 (second ed.). Münster: Libreria Regensbergiana. p. 189.
- Eubel, Conradus, ed. (1923). Hierarchia catholica (in Latin). Vol. 3 (second ed.). Münster: Libreria Regensbergiana.
- Gauchat, Patritius (Patrice) (1935). Hierarchia catholica (in Latin). Vol. IV (1592–1667). Münster: Libraria Regensbergiana. p. 237.
- Ritzler, Remigius; Sefrin, Pirminus (1952). Hierarchia catholica medii et recentis aevi (in Latin). Vol. V (1667–1730). Patavii: Messagero di S. Antonio. p. 263
- Ritzler, Remigius; Sefrin, Pirminus (1958). Hierarchia catholica medii et recentis aevi (in Latin). Vol. VI (1730–1799). Patavii: Messagero di S. Antonio. p. 284.
- Ritzler, Remigius; Sefrin, Pirminus (1968). Hierarchia Catholica medii et recentioris aevi (in Latin). Vol. VII (1800–1846). Monasterii: Libr. Regensburgiana.
- Remigius Ritzler; Pirminus Sefrin (1978). Hierarchia catholica Medii et recentioris aevi (in Latin). Vol. VIII (1846–1903). Il Messaggero di S. Antonio.
- Pięta, Zenon (2002). Hierarchia catholica medii et recentioris aevi (in Latin). Vol. IX (1903–1922). Padua: Messagero di San Antonio. ISBN 978-88-250-1000-8.

=== Studies ===
- Congregation of Saint-Maur, ed. (1759). Gallia Christiana: In Provincias Ecclesiasticas Distributa... De provincia Rotomagensi, ejusque metropoli ac suffraganeis (in Latin). Vol. 11. Paris: Typographia Regia. pp. 675–761; "Instrumenta", pp. 151–200.
- Desportes, Pierre; Fouché, Jean-Pascal; Loddé, Françoise –Vallière, Laurent (edd.) (2005): Fasti Ecclesiae Gallicanae. Répertoire prosopographique des évêques, dignitaires et chanoines des diocèses de France de 1200 à 1500. IX. Diocèse de Sées. Turnhout, Brepols. (in French)
- Duchesne, Louis (1910). Fastes épiscopaux de l'ancienne Gaule: L'Aquitaine et les Lyonnaises (in French). 2nd ed. Volume 2. Paris: Fontemoing 1910.
- Fisquet, Honoré (1864). La France pontificale. Métropole de Rouen. Séez. (in French). Volume 14. Paris: E.Repos 1864.
- Hommey, Louis Pierre (1898, 1899, 1900). Histoire générale ecclésiastique et civile du diocèse de Séez: ancien et nouveau, et du territoire qui forme aujourd'hui le Département de l'Orne, (in French). Alençon: E. Renaut-De Broise. Volume 1 (1898). Volume 2 (1899). Volume 3 (1900). Volume 4 (1900). Volume 5 (1900).
- Jean, Armand (1891). Les évêques et les archevêques de France depuis 1682 jusqu'à 1801 (in French). Paris: A. Picard.
- Marais, H. & Beaudoin, H. (1876). Essai historique sur la cathédrale et le chapitre de Séez. (in French). Alençon: Ch. Thomas 1876.
- Maurey d'Orville, Pierre-Claude (1829). Recherches historiques sur la ville, les évêques et le diocèse de Séez (in French). Séez: P. Brée.
- Pisani, Paul (1907). Répertoire biographique de l'épiscopat constitutionnel (1791–1802) (in French). Paris: A. Picard et fils.
- Société bibliographique (France) (1907). L'épiscopat français depuis le Concordat jusqu'à la Séparation (1802–1905). Paris: Librairie des Saints-Pères.
