= Saint-Laurent-de-Brèvedent =

- Commune
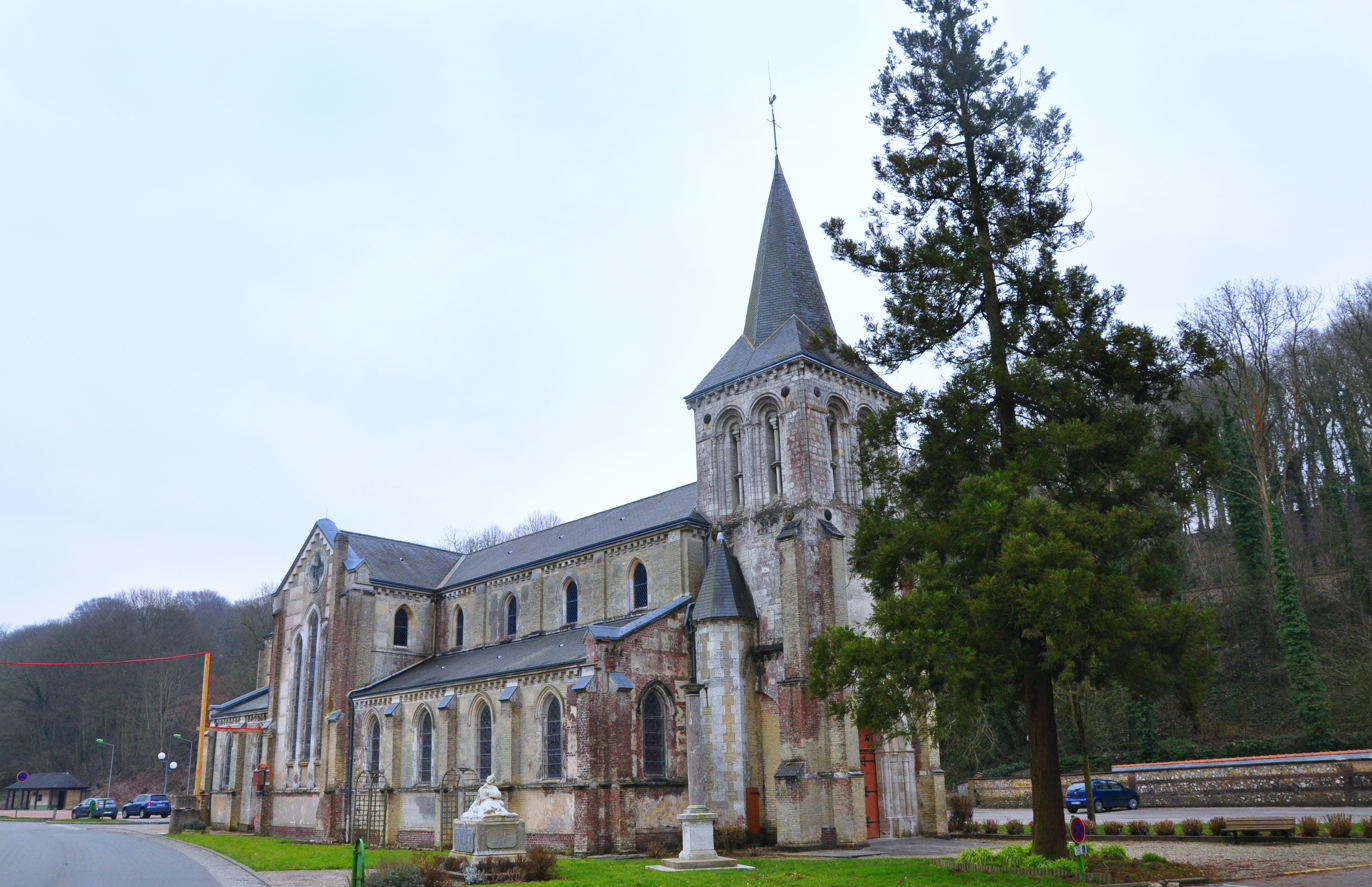
- The church in Saint-Laurent-de-Brèvedent

- Coat of arms
- Location of Saint-Laurent-de-Brèvedent
- Location within France Location within Normandy
- Coordinates: 49°31′37″N 0°15′26″E
- Country: France
- Region: Normandy
- Department: Seine-Maritime
- Arrondissement: Le Havre
- Canton: Saint-Romain-de-Colbosc
- Intercommunality: Le Havre Seine Métropole

Government
  - Mayor (2026–32): Patrick Busson
- Area^{1}: 7.78 km^{2} (3.00 sq mi)
- Elevation: 46 m (151 ft)
- Highest elevation: 108 m (354 ft)
- Lowest elevation: 33 m (108 ft)
- Population (2023): 1,496
  - Density: 192/km^{2} (498/sq mi)
- Time zone: UTC+01:00 (CET)
  - Summer (DST): UTC+02:00 (CEST)
- INSEE/Postal code: 76596 /76700
- ^{1} French Land Register data, which excludes lakes, ponds, glaciers > 1 km^{2} (0.386 sq mi or 247 acres) and river estuaries.

Saint-Laurent-de-Brèvedent (French pronunciation: [sɛ̃ loʁɑ̃ də bʁɛvdɑ̃]) is a commune in the Seine-Maritime department in the Normandy region in northern France.

== Geography ==
A village of farming and forestry, by the banks of the St.Laurent river, in the Pays de Caux, situated some 9 miles (14 km) northeast of Le Havre, at the junction of the D34, D234 and D111 roads. The commune has a TER railway station and a reservoir providing water for the city of Le Havre.

== History ==
The village is named after Lawrence of Rome, patron of the village church. The word "Brévedent" probably has its origins in an early Germanic language as beber (beaver) and daum (river), which can be translated as "beaver river" .
The village grew during medieval times, with the construction of the first church in the 12th century. Only the original tower still remains, the rest having been completely rebuilt between 1865 and 1879.
Unusually, a school has existed here since the Middle Ages, even if it functioned erratically. It was replaced by a new building in 1789, during the French Revolution, then again in 1892 and finally rebuilt in 1994.
The commune enjoyed considerable tourism during the second half of the nineteenth century and the first half of the twentieth century, as the opening of the railway station in 1847 allowed the residents of Le Havre to spend weekends here in holiday villas, some of which can still seen in the district of Catillon (now nicknamed the "Riviera").
During the Second World War the area, with the calm of the countryside, became a place of refuge for the people of Le Havre, with its proximity and ease of access, far from the industrial and military targets of the large port.

=== Heraldry ===
Arms of Saint-Laurent-de-Brèvedent	The arms of Saint-Laurent-de-Brèvedent are blazoned : Or, on bend wavy azure between a tree vert and a beaver proper, a lion and an eagle each within an annulet Or.

== Population ==
Historical population
Year	Pop.	±% p.a.
1968	836	—
1975	930	+1.53%
1982	1,358	+5.56%
1990	1,447	+0.80%
1999	1,489	+0.32%
2007	1,438	−0.43%
2012	1,409	−0.41%
2017	1,467	+0.81%
2023	1,496	+0.33%
Source: INSEE

== Places of interest ==
- The nineteenth-century chateau of Aplemont.
- William Malet a companion of William the Conqueror, built himself a castle at Graville and a Motte-and-bailey Castle in Aplemont, France (Normandy).
- The church of St. Laurent, dating from the twelfth century.
- The reservoir and the woods.

== See also ==
- Communes of the Seine-Maritime department
