= Séez, Savoie =

Séez
- Commune
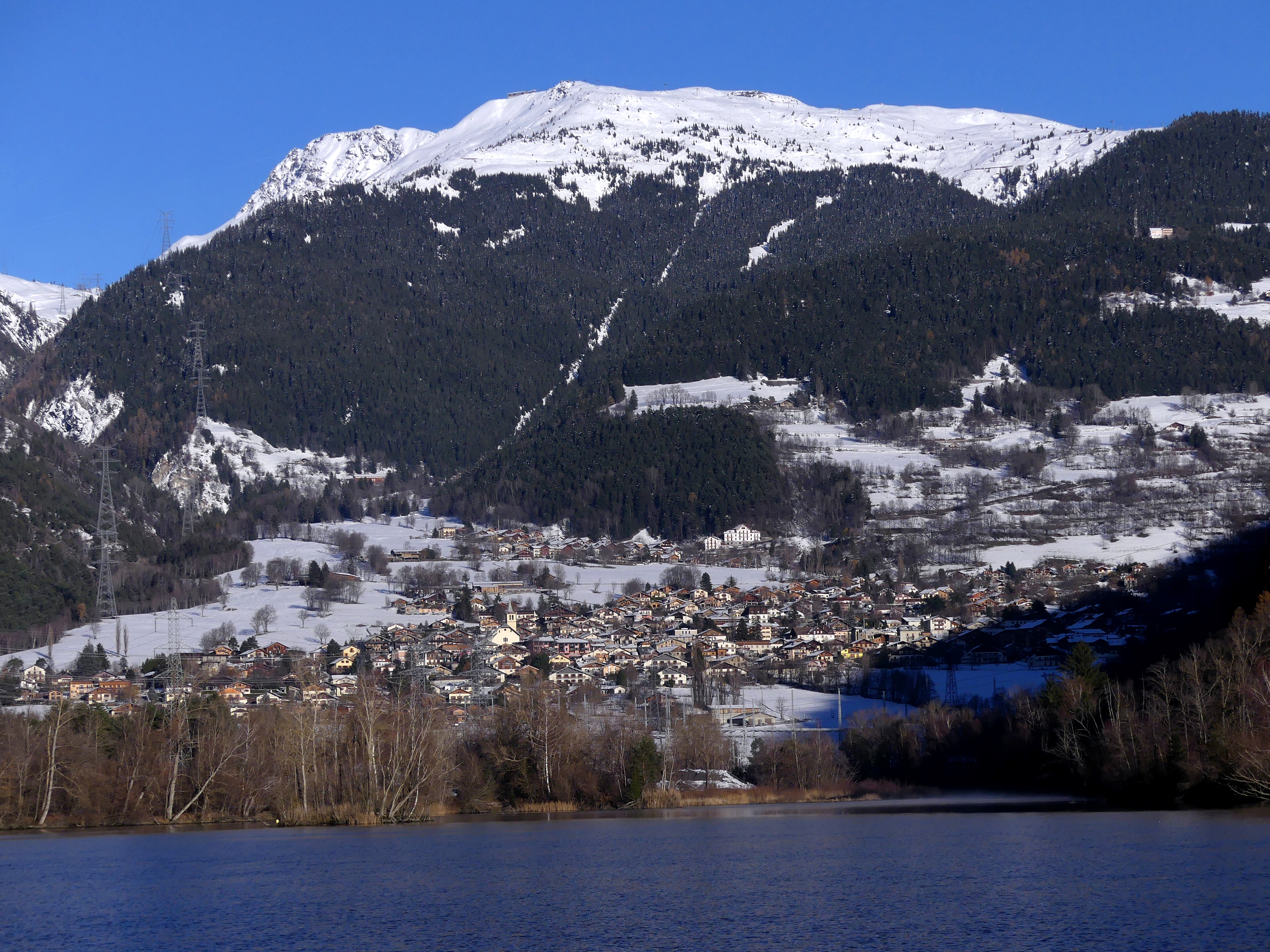
- A general view of Séez

- Coat of arms
- Location of Séez
- Location within France Location within Auvergne-Rhône-Alpes
- Coordinates: 45°37′25″N 6°48′06″E
- Country: France
- Region: Auvergne-Rhône-Alpes
- Department: Savoie
- Arrondissement: Albertville
- Canton: Bourg-Saint-Maurice
- Intercommunality: Haute Tarentaise

Government
  - Mayor (2020–2026): Lionel Arpin
- Area^{1}: 42.55 km^{2} (16.43 sq mi)
- Highest elevation: 2,979 m (9,774 ft)
- Lowest elevation: 807 m (2,648 ft)
- Population (2023): 2,459
  - Density: 57.79/km^{2} (149.7/sq mi)
- Time zone: UTC+01:00 (CET)
  - Summer (DST): UTC+02:00 (CEST)
- INSEE/Postal code: 73285 /73700
- Website: www.seez.fr
- ^{1} French Land Register data, which excludes lakes, ponds, glaciers > 1 km^{2} (0.386 sq mi or 247 acres) and river estuaries.

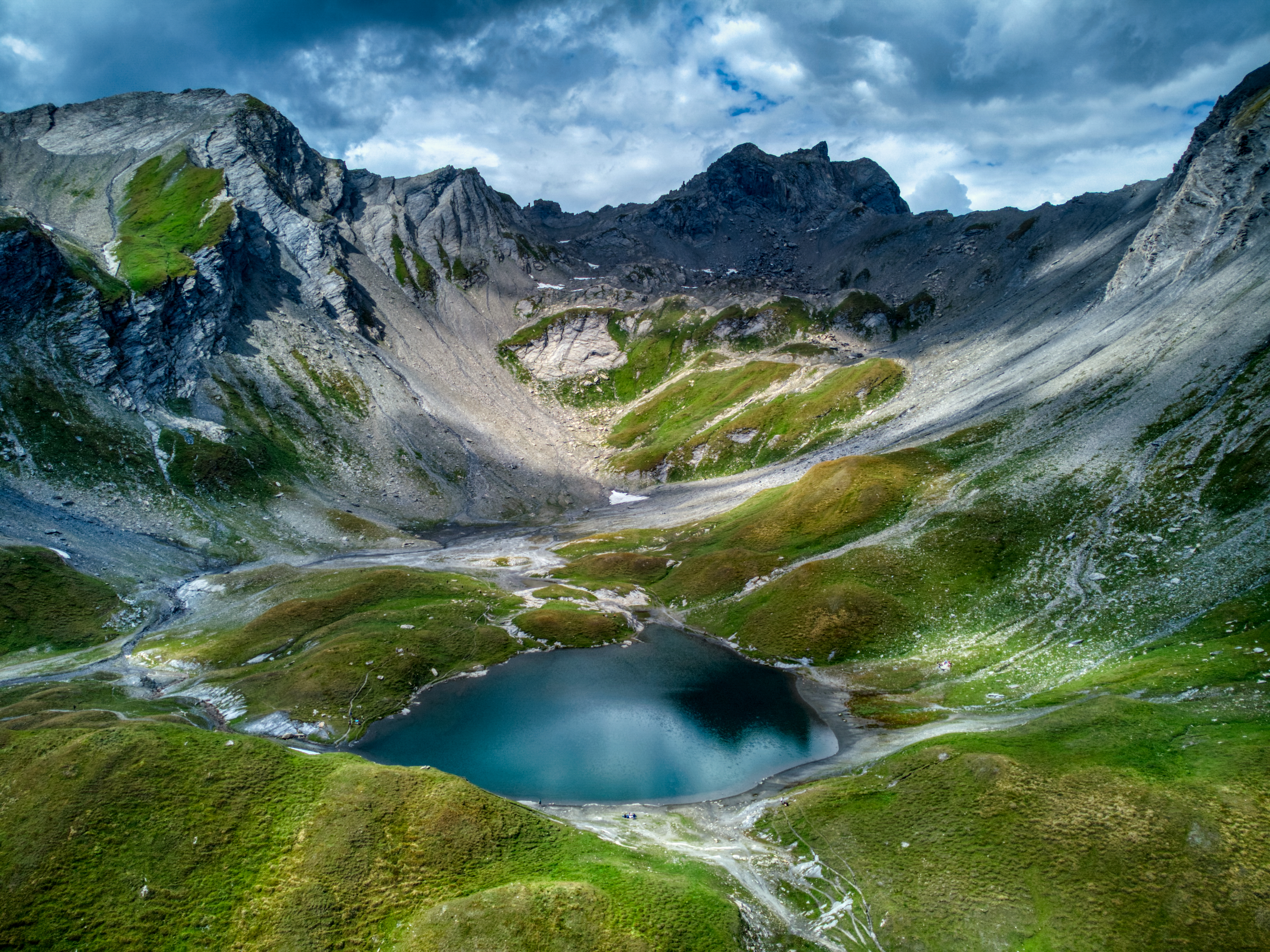
Lake Sans Fond near Séez

Séez (French pronunciation: [se]; Arpitan: Sé) is a commune in the Savoie department in the Auvergne-Rhône-Alpes region in south-eastern France.

It is located In the Tarentaise valley, between the Little St Bernard Pass and the edge of the Vanoise National Park.

== Population ==
Historical population
| Year | Pop. | ±% p.a. |
|---|---|---|
| 1968 | 1,134 | — |
| 1975 | 1,134 | +0.00% |
| 1982 | 1,300 | +1.97% |
| 1990 | 1,662 | +3.12% |
| 1999 | 1,968 | +1.90% |
| 2007 | 2,305 | +2.00% |
| 2012 | 2,453 | +1.25% |
| 2017 | 2,355 | −0.81% |
| 2023 | 2,459 | +0.72% |
Source: INSEE

== See also ==
- Communes of the Savoie department
